= Grade II* listed buildings in Dover (district) =

There are over 20,000 Grade II* listed buildings in England. This page is a list of these buildings in the district of Dover in Kent.

== Buildings ==
Name	Location	Type	Completed (Note: The date given is the date used by Historic England as significant for the initial building or that of an important part in the structure's description.)	Date designated	Grid ref. (Note: The grid reference is based on the British national grid reference system, sometimes known as OSGB36, used by the Ordnance Survey.) Geo-coordinates	Entry number (Note: The "List Entry Number" is a unique number assigned to each listed building and scheduled monument by Historic England.)	Image
Chilton House	Ash, Dover	House	Late 17th century	11 October 1963	TR2862558409; 51°16′44″N 1°16′36″E	1054893	Upload Photo
Paramour Grange	Paramour Street, Ash	House	c.1600	13 October 1952	TR2886161088; 51°18′10″N 1°16′55″E	1070220	Upload Photo
School Farm House	Guilton, Ash	House	Dated 1691 on wall ties	13 October 1952	TR2799458302; 51°16′42″N 1°16′04″E	1051629	Upload Photo
Wingham Barton Manor	Ash	Continuous jetty house	15th century or earlier	10 November 1963	TR2738261205; 51°18′16″N 1°15′39″E	1070203	Wingham Barton Manor More images
Church of St George	Deal	Chapel of ease	1706–16	1 June 1949	TR3763252850; 51°13′31″N 1°24′07″E	1253171	Church of St George More images
Church of St Leonard	Deal	Church	Norman	1 June 1949	TR3626751853; 51°13′01″N 1°22′55″E	1343697	Church of St Leonard More images
Queen Anne House	Deal	House	Early 18th century	1 June 1949	TR3775052579; 51°13′22″N 1°24′13″E	1069827	Upload Photo
Church of St Martin	Denton with Wootton	Parish church	12th century	22 August 1962	TR2250746547; 51°10′29″N 1°10′55″E	1363381	Church of St Martin More images
Church of St Mary Magdalene	Denton with Wootton	Parish church	13th century	22 August 1962	TR2164246713; 51°10′36″N 1°10′11″E	1070009	Church of St Mary Magdalene More images
Denton Court and Entrance Court	Denton with Wootton	House	16th century	27 August 1952	TR2170046730; 51°10′36″N 1°10′14″E	1363377	Denton Court and Entrance Court More images
Tappington Hall	Denton with Wootton	Jettied house	16th century	27 August 1952	TR2100846239; 51°10′22″N 1°09′37″E	1070011	Tappington Hall More images
Church of St Peter and St Paul	Charlton-in-Dover, Dover	Church	1891–93	27 October 1976	TR3140142310; 51°08′00″N 1°18′22″E	1273145	Church of St Peter and St Paul More images
Library, Dover College	Dover	School	1880	30 June 1949	TR3147741529; 51°07′34″N 1°18′24″E	1069497	Upload Photo
Maison Dieu House	Dover	House	1665	30 June 1949	TR3165241724; 51°07′41″N 1°18′34″E	1069521	Maison Dieu House More images
Parish Church of St Andrew, Buckland	Dover	Church	Late 12th century	30 June 1949	TR3049142729; 51°08′15″N 1°17′36″E	1069505	Parish Church of St Andrew, Buckland More images
Ruins of cloisters to west of the refectory of St Martin's Priory, Dover College	Dover	Cloister	Mid-12th century	30 June 1949	TR3152241560; 51°07′35″N 1°18′27″E	1069496	Upload Photo
School Chapel, Dover College	Dover	Guest house	Late 12th century	30 June 1949	TR3143641624; 51°07′38″N 1°18′22″E	1343820	Upload Photo
The School Hall, Dover College	Dover	Benedictine monastery	c.1139	30 June 1949	TR3154241582; 51°07′36″N 1°18′28″E	1343819	The School Hall, Dover College More images
St Edmund's Chapel	Dover	Chapel	12th century	17 December 1973	TR3165641661; 51°07′38″N 1°18′34″E	1070322	St Edmund's Chapel More images
The Parish Church of St Mary the Virgin	Dover	Church	Early 12th-century tower	30 June 1949	TR3192041516; 51°07′33″N 1°18′47″E	1069522	The Parish Church of St Mary the Virgin More images
Brook House	Eastry	House	1710	11 October 1963	TR3121054568; 51°14′36″N 1°18′41″E	1055854	Brook House More images
Felderland House	Eastry	House	Early 18th century	11 October 1963	TR3206255908; 51°15′18″N 1°19′28″E	1363307	Upload Photo
Great Selson	Selson, Eastry	House	Mid-17th century	11 October 1963	TR3006055552; 51°15′10″N 1°17′44″E	1038321	Great Selson More images
Heronden	Eastry	House	1766	11 October 1963	TR2956054265; 51°14′29″N 1°17′15″E	1363272	Heronden More images
Church of St Peter and St Paul	Eythorne	Parish church	c.1200	11 October 1963	TR2795849705; 51°12′04″N 1°15′42″E	1121964	Church of St Peter and St Paul More images
Chillenden Windmill	Chillenden, Goodnestone	Post mill	1868	11 October 1963	TR2689954238; 51°14′32″N 1°14′58″E	1111765	Chillenden Windmill More images
Church of All Saints	Chillenden, Goodnestone	Parish church	12th century	11 October 1963	TR2695753594; 51°14′11″N 1°14′59″E	1070283	Church of All Saints More images
Dovecote about 100 metres north-west of Knowlton Court	Knowlton, Goodnestone	Dovecote	Early 18th century	11 October 1963	TR2807653394; 51°14′03″N 1°15′57″E	1070289	Dovecote about 100 metres north-west of Knowlton Court
Goodnestone Park	Goodnestone	House	c.1704	13 October 1952	TR2533754342; 51°14′37″N 1°13′38″E	1070296	Goodnestone Park More images
The Dower House	Goodnestone	House	Late 18th century	13 October 1952	TR2542354478; 51°14′42″N 1°13′42″E	1070257	Upload Photo
The Dower House	Knowlton, Goodnestone	Dower house	Late 16th century	11 October 1963	TR2799453444; 51°14′05″N 1°15′52″E	1336976	Upload Photo
The Gabriel Richards Almshouses	Goodnestone	Almshouse	Mid-17th century	13 October 1952	TR2566354761; 51°14′50″N 1°13′55″E	1070263	The Gabriel Richards Almshouses More images
Church of St Martin	Great Mongeham	Church	12th to 15th century	1 June 1949	TR3461951504; 51°12′52″N 1°21′29″E	1069782	Church of St Martin More images
Church of St Martin of Tours	Guston	Parish church	12th century	22 August 1966	TR3222944733; 51°09′17″N 1°19′10″E	1070050	Church of St Martin of Tours More images
Ruins of St. Radegund's Abbey	Hougham Without	Abbey	13th century	22 August 1962	TR2753741993; 51°07′55″N 1°15′03″E	1070023	Ruins of St. Radegund's Abbey More images
St. Radegund's Abbey Farmhouse and outhouse	Hougham Without	Abbey	Early 13th century	17 August 1952	TR2753841955; 51°07′54″N 1°15′03″E	1068889	St. Radegund's Abbey Farmhouse and outhouse More images
Stone barn at St. Radegund's Abbey Farm, about 65 metres south of well house	Hougham Without	Barn	13th century	28 May 1987	TR2754841862; 51°07′51″N 1°15′03″E	1356562	Stone barn at St. Radegund's Abbey Farm, about 65 metres south of well house More images
Barn about 20 metres north-east of Jossenblock	East Langdon, Langdon	Aisled barn	1725	23 April 1987	TR3338646179; 51°10′02″N 1°20′13″E	1070052	Upload Photo
Church of St Augustine	East Langdon, Langdon	Parish church	11th century	23 April 1987	TR3331045980; 51°09′56″N 1°20′09″E	1070054	Church of St Augustine More images
Jossenblock	East Langdon, Langdon	House	17th century or earlier	22 August 1966	TR3338246146; 51°10′01″N 1°20′13″E	1070051	Upload Photo
Langdon Abbey	Langdon	Abbey	12th century and later	27 August 1952	TR3263446960; 51°10′28″N 1°19′36″E	1070055	Langdon Abbey More images
St. Mary (formerly listed as Church of St Mary Virgin)	Lydden	Parish church	12th century	22 August 1962	TR2642945710; 51°09′57″N 1°14′14″E	1342746	St. Mary (formerly listed as Church of St Mary Virgin) More images
Old St Albans Court and wall	St Albans Court, Nonington	House	1556	11 June 1986	TR2632252525; 51°13′37″N 1°14′24″E	1070243	Upload Photo
Southdown Cottage	Easole Street, Nonington	Hall house	13th century	23 April 1980	TR2608952064; 51°13′23″N 1°14′11″E	1070271	Southdown Cottage More images
Barn about 20 metres north of Northbourne Court	Northbourne	Barn	17th century	13 October 1952	TR3364552251; 51°13′18″N 1°20′41″E	1237002	Upload Photo
Betteshanger House, Northbourne Park School	Betteshanger, Northbourne	House	1856–1886	5 June 1973	TR3104452538; 51°13′31″N 1°18′27″E	1236988	Betteshanger House, Northbourne Park School More images
Church of St George	Ham, Northbourne	Parish church	13th-century fenestration	24 March 1987	TR3261854773; 51°14′41″N 1°19′54″E	1264237	Church of St George More images
Garden walls at Northbourne Court	Northbourne	Walled garden	c.1616	13 October 1952	TR3370052184; 51°13′16″N 1°20′43″E	1237003	Garden walls at Northbourne Court
Vine Farmhouse	Northbourne	House	17th century	13 October 1952	TR3341652109; 51°13′14″N 1°20′28″E	1237301	Vine Farmhouse More images
Elmstone Church (dedication unknown)	Elmstone, Preston	Parish church	12th century	11 October 1963	TR2614960284; 51°17′48″N 1°14′33″E	1070154	Elmstone Church (dedication unknown) More images
Church of St Mary the Virgin	Church Lane, Ripple	Parish church	1861	24 March 1987	TR3503150207; 51°12′10″N 1°21′47″E	1264330	Church of St Mary the Virgin More images
Ripple Court and outhouses in rear courtyard	Ripple	House	1796–1806	11 October 1963	TR3493048811; 51°11′25″N 1°21′39″E	1237011	Upload Photo
Winklandoaks Farmhouse	Ripple	Farmhouse	Late 17th century	11 October 1963	TR3399348423; 51°11′14″N 1°20′50″E	1264333	Winklandoaks Farmhouse More images
Crabble Mill	River	Flour mill	1812	5 June 1972	TR2975343184; 51°08′30″N 1°16′59″E	1070318	Crabble Mill More images
Bartlemas	Stone Cross, Sandwich	House	Early 19th century	19 May 1950	TR3308057572; 51°16′11″N 1°20′24″E	1069714	Upload Photo
Bridge (site of the Sandown Gate)	Sandwich	Moat	1650–1675	23 April 1976	TR3347258038; 51°16′25″N 1°20′45″E	1122658	Bridge (site of the Sandown Gate) More images
Curfew House	Sandwich	House	18th century	19 May 1950	TR3311158148; 51°16′29″N 1°20′27″E	1069567	Curfew House More images
Delf House	Sandwich	House	17th century	19 May 1950	TR3290458232; 51°16′32″N 1°20′16″E	1069712	Delf House More images
Invicta House, Ye Olde King's Arms	Sandwich	House	Dated 1592	19 May 1950	TR3292658438; 51°16′39″N 1°20′18″E	1069542	Invicta House, Ye Olde King's Arms More images
Luckboat House	Sandwich	House	Dated 1771	19 May 1950	TR3314758023; 51°16′25″N 1°20′28″E	1069639	Luckboat House More images
Manwood Close, Manwood Court	Sandwich	House	1564	19 May 1950	TR3276858519; 51°16′42″N 1°20′10″E	1069546	Manwood Close, Manwood Court More images
No 52 (New Street), including the outhouse to north	Sandwich	House	Mid-18th century	19 May 1950	TR3309757990; 51°16′24″N 1°20′26″E	1343786	Upload Photo
Pellicane House	Sandwich	House	15th century	19 May 1950	TR3314958170; 51°16′30″N 1°20′29″E	1335883	Pellicane House
Petersham House	Sandwich	House	Late 18th century	19 May 1950	TR3314558032; 51°16′25″N 1°20′28″E	1105686	Petersham House More images
Richborough House	Sandwich	House	18th century	19 May 1950	TR3292858315; 51°16′35″N 1°20′18″E	1069762	Richborough House More images
Stuart House	Sandwich	House	Early 19th century	23 April 1976	TR3288958307; 51°16′35″N 1°20′16″E	1069708	Upload Photo
The Admiral Owen Public House	Sandwich	Public house	15th century	19 May 1950	TR3315758231; 51°16′32″N 1°20′29″E	1069656	The Admiral Owen Public House More images
The Dutch House	Sandwich	House	Late 17th century	19 May 1950	TR3315657986; 51°16′24″N 1°20′29″E	1105688	The Dutch House More images
The Guildhall	Sandwich	Guildhall	1579	19 May 1950	TR3295658147; 51°16′29″N 1°20′19″E	1069731	The Guildhall More images
The Haven Guest House	Sandwich	House	Probably early 15th century	19 May 1950	TR3300258319; 51°16′35″N 1°20′22″E	1069695	The Haven Guest House More images
The Red Cow Public House	Sandwich	Jettied house	16th century	29 April 1970	TR3288658139; 51°16′29″N 1°20′15″E	1106323	The Red Cow Public House More images
5 King Street	Sandwich	House	16th century	19 May 1950	TR3307958120; 51°16′28″N 1°20′25″E	1069630	5 King Street More images
11, 11a, 13, 15 and 15a Strand Street	Sandwich	Jettied house	15th century	19 May 1950	TR3312258251; 51°16′32″N 1°20′28″E	1069574	11, 11a, 13, 15 and 15a Strand Street More images
1 Potter Street	Sandwich	House	18th century	19 May 1950	TR3304958262; 51°16′33″N 1°20′24″E	1069596	1 Potter Street More images
15 Mill Wall Place	Sandwich	House	Early 17th century	23 April 1976	TR3320057908; 51°16′21″N 1°20′31″E	1069612	Upload Photo
3 and 5 Vicarage Lane	Sandwich	Timber-framed house	Mid-13th-century arch	19 May 1950	TR3289458341; 51°16′36″N 1°20′16″E	1121958	3 and 5 Vicarage Lane More images
17 Mill Wall Place	Sandwich	House	Early 19th century	29 April 1970	TR3320657892; 51°16′21″N 1°20′31″E	1343757	Upload Photo
21 King Street	Sandwich	House	18th century	19 May 1950	TR3315558053; 51°16′26″N 1°20′29″E	1343765	21 King Street More images
27 Strand Street	Sandwich	Timber-framed house	1526	19 May 1950	TR3309158282; 51°16′34″N 1°20′26″E	1069576	27 Strand Street More images
West Court & West Court Farmhouse	Shepherdswell with Coldred	Farmhouse	Early 14th century	27 August 1952	TR2479547948; 51°11′12″N 1°12′55″E	1069986	West Court & West Court Farmhouse More images
Church of St Nicholas	Sholden	Parish church	13th century	11 October 1963	TR3592452170; 51°13′12″N 1°22′38″E	1237584	Church of St Nicholas More images
Church of St Peter	Westcliffe, St Margaret's at Cliffe	Parish church	12th century	22 August 1966	TR3487544801; 51°09′15″N 1°21′26″E	1070033	Church of St Peter More images
Transmitter Tower (tower 2), former Swingate Chain Home Radar Station	St Margaret's at Cliffe	Transmitter tower	1936–38	13 July 2012	TR3345642915; 51°08′16″N 1°20′09″E	1405535	Transmitter Tower (tower 2), former Swingate Chain Home Radar Station More images
Wallets Court	Westcliffe, St Margaret's at Cliffe	House	1627	27 August 1952	TR3490444742; 51°09′13″N 1°21′28″E	1084342	Wallets Court More images
Crixhall Court	Crixhall, Staple	House	Early 17th century	13 October 1952	TR2669555758; 51°15′21″N 1°14′51″E	1354754	Upload Photo
Stourmouth House	Stourmouth	House	Early 18th-century front	13 October 1952	TR2659162615; 51°19′03″N 1°15′01″E	1281733	Upload Photo
Church of St Peter and St Paul	Church Hill, Sutton	Parish church	12th century	11 October 1963	TR3343249340; 51°11′44″N 1°20′23″E	1247673	Church of St Peter and St Paul More images
Maydensole Farmhouse	Sutton	Farmhouse	16th century	11 October 1963	TR3149047616; 51°10′51″N 1°18′39″E	1237618	Maydensole Farmhouse More images
Church of St Peter and St Paul	Temple Ewell	Church	12th century	22 August 1966	TR2861844221; 51°09′06″N 1°16′04″E	1357572	Church of St Peter and St Paul More images
Church of All Saints	Waldershare, Tilmanstone	Church	12th-century origins	11 October 1963	TR2970948277; 51°11′15″N 1°17′09″E	1247812	Church of All Saints More images
Dane Court	Tilmanstone	House	1724	13 October 1952	TR2978151629; 51°13′03″N 1°17′20″E	1247718	Dane Court More images
Malmains Farmhouse and Shareborne House and wall attached	Waldershare, Tilmanstone	Farmhouse	c.1800	13 October 1952	TR2981649135; 51°11′43″N 1°17′16″E	1263941	Upload Photo
Church of St Mary the Blessed Virgin	Walmer	Church	19th century	1 June 1949	TR3669650342; 51°12′12″N 1°23′13″E	1251215	Church of St Mary the Blessed Virgin More images
Church of St Peter	Whitfield	Church	8th or 10th century	23 April 1987	TR3107145886; 51°09′56″N 1°18′13″E	1068592	Church of St Peter More images
Delbridge House	Wingham	House	Early 18th century	13 October 1952	TR2413957461; 51°16′20″N 1°12′43″E	1363339	Delbridge House More images
Old Forge House	Wingham	Clergy house	15th century	13 October 1952	TR2429057399; 51°16′18″N 1°12′51″E	1203671	Old Forge House More images
The Dog Inn	Wingham	Public house	15th century	13 October 1952	TR2426757397; 51°16′18″N 1°12′50″E	1070097	The Dog Inn More images
The Red Lion	Wingham	Continuous jetty house	Late 15th or 16th century	13 October 1952	TR2431557394; 51°16′17″N 1°12′52″E	1363343	The Red Lion More images
The Vicarage	Wingham	Vicarage	Mid-18th century	11 October 1963	TR2426057347; 51°16′16″N 1°12′49″E	1070101	Upload Photo
Wingham Court and garden wall	Wingham	House	15th century	13 October 1952	TR2417857411; 51°16′18″N 1°12′45″E	1203692	Wingham Court and garden wall More images
41 High Street	Wingham	House	Late 17th century	13 October 1952	TR2434857490; 51°16′21″N 1°12′54″E	1070118	41 High Street
Church of St Mary the Virgin	Woodnesborough	Parish church	c.1200	11 October 1963	TR3084156721; 51°15′46″N 1°18′27″E	1281495	Church of St Mary the Virgin More images
Poulton Manor	Woodnesborough	House	Early 18th century	13 October 1952	TR2805657774; 51°16′24″N 1°16′06″E	1203887	Poulton Manor
The Coach House, Street Farm	Woodnesborough	House	Early 18th century	11 October 1963	TR3112057157; 51°16′00″N 1°18′42″E	1203901	Upload Photo
Church of St Peter and St Paul	Worth	Parish church	12th century	11 October 1963	TR3368456111; 51°15′22″N 1°20′52″E	1263919	Church of St Peter and St Paul More images
Castle Hill House	Castle Hill Road, Dover	House	1760	22 September 2014	TR3222041565; 51°07′35″N 1°19′02″E	1069524	Castle Hill House More images

== See also ==
- Grade I listed buildings in Kent
  - Grade I listed buildings in Dover (district)
- Grade II* listed buildings in Kent
  - Grade II* listed buildings in Ashford (borough)
  - Grade II* listed buildings in City of Canterbury
  - Grade II* listed buildings in Dartford (borough)
  - Grade II* listed buildings in Folkestone and Hythe
  - Grade II* listed buildings in Gravesham
  - Grade II* listed buildings in Maidstone (borough)
  - Grade II* listed buildings in Medway
  - Grade II* listed buildings in Sevenoaks (district)
  - Grade II* listed buildings in Swale
  - Grade II* listed buildings in Thanet
  - Grade II* listed buildings in Tonbridge and Malling
  - Grade II* listed buildings in Tunbridge Wells (borough)
