= Grade II* listed buildings in Dartford (borough) =

There are over 20,000 Grade II* listed buildings in England. This page is a list of these buildings in the district of Dartford in Kent.

== Listed buildings ==
| Name | Location | Type | Completed (Note: The date given is the date used by Historic England as significant for the initial building or that of an important part in the structure's description.) | Date designated | Grid ref. (Note: Sometimes known as OSGB36, the grid reference is based on the British national grid reference system used by the Ordnance Survey.) Geo-coordinates | Entry number (Note: The "List Entry Number" is a unique number assigned to each listed building and scheduled monument by Historic England.) | Image |
|---|---|---|---|---|---|---|---|
| Church of Saint Mary Magdalene | Longfield and New Barn, Dartford | Church | 13th century | 1 June 1967 | TQ6033469048; 51°23′52″N 0°18′12″E | 1239125 | Church of Saint Mary Magdalene More images |
| Chapter Farmhouse | Southfleet | Farmhouse | 16th century | 1 June 1967 | TQ6168470794; 51°24′47″N 0°19′25″E | 1085800 | Chapter Farmhouse More images |
| Friary Court and Old Friary | Southfleet, Dartford | House | 14th century | 1 August 1952 | TQ6127470866; 51°24′50″N 0°19′04″E | 1085828 | Friary Court and Old Friary |
| The Limes | Southfleet | House | 18th century | 1 June 1967 | TQ6114370664; 51°24′44″N 0°18′57″E | 1085795 | Upload Photo |
| Columbarium at Hawley Manor | Hawley, Sutton-at-Hone and Hawley | Dovecote | 1556 | 1 August 1952 | TQ5488672048; 51°25′35″N 0°13′35″E | 1085812 | Columbarium at Hawley Manor More images |
| St John's Jerusalem | Sutton-at-Hone and Hawley | House | 13th century | 1 August 1952 | TQ5588870353; 51°24′39″N 0°14′24″E | 1085776 | St John's Jerusalem More images |
| Church of All Saints | Swanscombe and Greenhithe | Church | 1894 | 17 March 1982 | TQ6057474841; 51°26′59″N 0°18′34″E | 1085781 | Church of All Saints More images |
| Priory Farmhouse containing the remains of Dartford Priory gatehouse | Dartford | Farmhouse | 1541–45 | 22 December 1953 | TQ5393874402; 51°26′52″N 0°12′50″E | 1086030 | Priory Farmhouse containing the remains of Dartford Priory gatehouse More images |
| The Royal Victoria and Bull Inn | Dartford | Coaching inn | 1703 | 22 December 1953 | TQ5417174024; 51°26′39″N 0°13′01″E | 1086025 | The Royal Victoria and Bull Inn More images |
| 45 High Street | Dartford | House | Late 18th century | 22 December 1953 | TQ5431174002; 51°26′38″N 0°13′09″E | 1336369 | 45 High Street More images |

== See also ==
- Grade I listed buildings in Dartford (borough)
- Grade II* listed buildings in Kent
  - Grade II* listed buildings in Sevenoaks (district)
  - Grade II* listed buildings in Gravesham
  - Grade II* listed buildings in Tonbridge and Malling
  - Grade II* listed buildings in Medway
  - Grade II* listed buildings in Maidstone (borough)
  - Grade II* listed buildings in Tunbridge Wells (borough)
  - Grade II* listed buildings in Swale
  - Grade II* listed buildings in Ashford (borough)
  - Grade II* listed buildings in City of Canterbury
  - Grade II* listed buildings in Shepway
  - Grade II* listed buildings in Thanet
  - Grade II* listed buildings in Dover (district)
