= Listed buildings in Eythorne =

Historic structures in Kent, England

Eythorne is a village and civil parish in the Dover District of Kent, England. It contains 33 listed buildings that are recorded in the National Heritage List for England. Of these one is grade I, one is grade II* and 31 are grade II.

This list is based on the information retrieved online from Historic England.

== Key ==
Grade	Criteria
I	Buildings that are of exceptional interest
II*	Particularly important buildings of more than special interest
II	Buildings that are of special interest

== Listing ==
Name	Grade	Location	Type	Completed (Note: The date given is the date used by Historic England as significant for the initial building or that of an important part in the structure's description.)	Date designated	Grid ref. (Note: The grid reference is based on the British national grid reference system, sometimes known as OSGB36, used by the Ordnance Survey.) Geo-coordinates	Notes	Entry number (Note: The "List Entry Number" is a unique number assigned to each listed building and scheduled monument by Historic England.)	Image	Wikidata
Eythorne War Memorial	II	CT15 4AA	war memorial		3 February 2016	TR2832749151; 51°11′45″N 1°16′00″E		1432575	Eythorne War Memorial More images	Q26677832
Ivy Cottages	II	1 and 2, Barfrestone			3 December 1986	TR2635450147; 51°12′20″N 1°14′21″E		1070309	Upload Photo	Q26324063
Barfrestone Court	II	Barfrestone			11 October 1963	TR2644050114; 51°12′19″N 1°14′25″E		1122002	Upload Photo	Q26415133
Church Farm	II	Barfrestone			11 October 1963	TR2627250155; 51°12′21″N 1°14′16″E		1070307	Upload Photo	Q26324055
Church of St Nicholas	I	Barfrestone	church building		11 October 1963	TR2642550146; 51°12′20″N 1°14′24″E		1070306	Church of St Nicholas More images	Q17529736
Granary About 10 Metres South East of Church Farm	II	Barfrestone			3 December 1986	TR2628650145; 51°12′20″N 1°14′17″E		1122005	Upload Photo	Q26415136
Kilmun	II	Barfrestone			3 December 1986	TR2641650206; 51°12′22″N 1°14′24″E		1338523	Upload Photo	Q26622838
Little Ewell	II	Barfrestone			11 October 1963	TR2655250152; 51°12′20″N 1°14′31″E		1070310	Upload Photo	Q26324065
Old Church Farmhouse	II	Barfrestone			11 October 1963	TR2631950185; 51°12′22″N 1°14′19″E		1122012	Upload Photo	Q26415145
Seathwood	II	Barfrestone			3 December 1986	TR2625350175; 51°12′21″N 1°14′15″E		1070308	Upload Photo	Q26324061
Church of St Peter and St Paul	II*	Church Hill	church building		11 October 1963	TR2795849705; 51°12′04″N 1°15′42″E		1121964	Church of St Peter and St Paul More images	Q17557737
Granary About 10 Metres South East of the Old Bakery	II	Church Hill			3 December 1986	TR2805249631; 51°12′01″N 1°15′47″E		1121927	Upload Photo	Q26415069
Group of 6 Headstones About 5-10 Metres West of Church of St Peter and St Paul	II	Church Hill			3 December 1986	TR2794149709; 51°12′04″N 1°15′41″E		1363221	Upload Photo	Q26645057
Monument to Sayer Family About 25 Metres South West of Church of St Peter and St Paul	II	Church Hill			3 December 1986	TR2793449693; 51°12′03″N 1°15′41″E		1070311	Upload Photo	Q26324068
Row of 6 Headstones About 2-10 Metres South of Church of St Peter and St Paul	II	Church Hill			3 December 1986	TR2795349690; 51°12′03″N 1°15′42″E		1338544	Upload Photo	Q26622859
The Old Bakery and Wall	II	Church Hill			3 December 1986	TR2804149640; 51°12′02″N 1°15′46″E		1363222	Upload Photo	Q26645058
Two Headstones About 3 Metres East of Church of St Peter and St Paul	II	Church Hill			3 December 1986	TR2797149700; 51°12′04″N 1°15′43″E		1070312	Upload Photo	Q26324070
Eyethorne House	II	Coldred Road			11 October 1963	TR2829449039; 51°11′42″N 1°15′58″E		1121932	Upload Photo	Q26415074
Gardeners Cottage	II	Coldred Road			3 December 1986	TR2830049058; 51°11′42″N 1°15′58″E		1070313	Upload Photo	Q26324075
North End House West End House Westfields	II	Coldred Road			10 November 1963	TR2818748964; 51°11′40″N 1°15′52″E		1363223	Upload Photo	Q26645059
Barn at Tr 279491	II	Flax Court Lane			3 December 1986	TR2794549185; 51°11′47″N 1°15′40″E		1070314	Upload Photo	Q26324079
Flax Court	II	Flax Court Lane			3 December 1986	TR2818449159; 51°11′46″N 1°15′52″E		1121899	Upload Photo	Q26415040
Woodpecker Court	II	45 Wigmore Lane, Lower Eyethorne			11 October 1963	TR2813349974; 51°12′12″N 1°15′52″E		1363224	Upload Photo	Q26645060
Langdown House	II	Sandwich Road			3 December 1986	TR2834449135; 51°11′45″N 1°16′01″E		1121881	Upload Photo	Q26415022
Barn About 40 Metres North West of Eythorne Court Eythorne Barn	II	Shepherdswell Road			3 November 1986	TR2791249460; 51°11′56″N 1°15′39″E		1121889	Upload Photo	Q26415030
Eythorne Court	II	Shepherdswell Road			11 October 1963	TR2789549395; 51°11′54″N 1°15′38″E		1070315	Upload Photo	Q26324086
Outbuilding About 25 Metres North West of Eythorne Court	II	Shepherdswell Road			3 December 1986	TR2790549408; 51°11′54″N 1°15′39″E		1070316	Upload Photo	Q26324088
Clare Cottage the Nook the Old Post Office	II	The Forstal			3 December 1986	TR2834149087; 51°11′43″N 1°16′00″E		1121905	Upload Photo	Q26415046
Copley House	II	The Street			14 May 1985	TR2845949062; 51°11′42″N 1°16′06″E		1363225	Upload Photo	Q26645061
Park End House	II	The Street			11 October 1963	TR2864549024; 51°11′41″N 1°16′16″E		1363243	Upload Photo	Q26645080
Baptist Chapel	II	Upper Eyethorne			3 December 1986	TR2829149423; 51°11′54″N 1°15′59″E		1070277	Upload Photo	Q26324000
Sparrowcourt	II	Wigmore Lane			3 December 1986	TR2808949649; 51°12′02″N 1°15′49″E		1363244	Upload Photo	Q26645081
Wigmore Court	II	Wigmore Lane			3 December 1986	TR2824349784; 51°12′06″N 1°15′57″E		1070278	Upload Photo	Q26324001

== See also ==
- Grade I listed buildings in Kent
- Grade II* listed buildings in Kent

== Sources ==
- Newman, John (2013) [1969], Kent: North-East and East, The Buildings of England, New Haven and London: Yale University Press, ISBN 978-0-300-18506-5
