= Listed buildings in Wingham, Kent =

Civil Parish in Kent, England

Wingham is a village and civil parish in the Dover District of Kent, England. It contains 98 listed buildings that are recorded in the National Heritage List for England. Of these two are grade I, seven are grade II* and 89 are grade II.

This list is based on the information retrieved online from Historic England.

== Key ==
Grade	Criteria
I	Buildings that are of exceptional interest
II*	Particularly important buildings of more than special interest
II	Buildings that are of special interest

== Listing ==
Name	Grade	Location	Type	Completed (Note: The date given is the date used by Historic England as significant for the initial building or that of an important part in the structure's description.)	Date designated	Grid ref. (Note: The grid reference is based on the British national grid reference system, sometimes known as OSGB36, used by the Ordnance Survey.) Geo-coordinates	Notes	Entry number (Note: The "List Entry Number" is a unique number assigned to each listed building and scheduled monument by Historic England.)	Image	Wikidata
Crockshard Farm, Including Attached Former Stables, Wall and Granary	II				11 May 2005	TR2489555981; 51°15′31″N 1°13′19″E		1408619	Upload Photo	Q26676025
Barn About 50 Metres South East of Dene Farmhouse	II	Adisham Road			26 November 1987	TR2421755823; 51°15′27″N 1°12′43″E		1070111	Upload Photo	Q26323686
Dene Cottage	II	Adisham Road			8 February 1980	TR2414055807; 51°15′26″N 1°12′39″E		1203406	Upload Photo	Q26498943
Dene Farmhouse	II	Adisham Road			11 October 1963	TR2415655896; 51°15′29″N 1°12′40″E		1070150	Upload Photo	Q26323763
The Octagon at Dene Farm	II	Adisham Road			26 November 1987	TR2416155820; 51°15′27″N 1°12′41″E		1070151	Upload Photo	Q26323765
Wingham Waterworks	II	Adisham Road			26 November 1987	TR2430655332; 51°15′11″N 1°12′47″E		1363294	Upload Photo	Q26645127
Canon Cottage the Old Canonry	I	Canterbury Road	cottage		13 October 1952	TR2424657401; 51°16′18″N 1°12′48″E		1281551	Canon Cottage the Old Canonry More images	Q17529764
Chest Tomb About 15 Metres South of Church of St Mary	II	Canterbury Road			26 November 1987	TR2421757451; 51°16′19″N 1°12′47″E		1070094	Upload Photo	Q26323654
Chest Tomb to Elgar Family About 25 Metres South of Church of St Mary	II	Canterbury Road			26 November 1987	TR2421857444; 51°16′19″N 1°12′47″E		1070095	Upload Photo	Q26323657
Church of St Mary	I	Canterbury Road	church building		11 October 1963	TR2421257474; 51°16′20″N 1°12′47″E		1070091	Church of St Mary More images	Q17492354
Delbridge House	II*	Canterbury Road	house		13 October 1952	TR2413957461; 51°16′20″N 1°12′43″E		1363339	Delbridge House More images	Q17557895
Mill House the Cottage	II	Canterbury Road			26 November 1987	TR2410357473; 51°16′20″N 1°12′41″E		1070090	Upload Photo	Q26323648
Old Forge House	II*	Canterbury Road	house		13 October 1952	TR2429057399; 51°16′18″N 1°12′51″E		1203671	Old Forge House More images	Q17557745
Pair of Headstones 1 and 2 Metres South of Church of St Mary	II	Canterbury Road			26 November 1987	TR2422157466; 51°16′20″N 1°12′47″E		1070093	Upload Photo	Q26323652
Pair of Headstones About 15 Metres South of Church of St Mary	II	Canterbury Road			26 November 1987	TR2421957452; 51°16′19″N 1°12′47″E		1363341	Upload Photo	Q26645172
Row of Eight Headstones 1 to 15 Metres South East of Church of St Mary	II	Canterbury Road			26 November 1987	TR2422557460; 51°16′20″N 1°12′48″E		1363340	Upload Photo	Q26645171
Row of Three Headstones 4 to 7 Metres South of Church of St Mary	II	Canterbury Road			26 November 1987	TR2420857460; 51°16′20″N 1°12′47″E		1070092	Upload Photo	Q26323650
Stables Adjoining Wingham Court	II	Canterbury Road			13 October 1952	TR2421757406; 51°16′18″N 1°12′47″E		1070098	Upload Photo	Q26323662
The Churchyard Wall to South, East and North of Church of St Mary	II	Canterbury Road			26 November 1987	TR2421457493; 51°16′21″N 1°12′47″E		1363342	Upload Photo	Q26645173
The Dog Inn	II*	Canterbury Road	pub		13 October 1952	TR2426757397; 51°16′18″N 1°12′50″E		1070097	The Dog Inn More images	Q17557663
The Red Lion	II*	Canterbury Road	pub		13 October 1952	TR2431557394; 51°16′17″N 1°12′52″E		1363343	The Red Lion More images	Q17557898
Wall and Stable About 20 Metres East of Wingham House	II	Canterbury Road			26 November 1987	TR2427157443; 51°16′19″N 1°12′50″E		1203658	Upload Photo	Q26499176
Wingham Court and Garden Wall	II*	Canterbury Road	architectural structure		13 October 1952	TR2417857411; 51°16′18″N 1°12′45″E		1203692	Wingham Court and Garden Wall More images	Q17557748
Wingham House	II	Canterbury Road			13 October 1952	TR2424457437; 51°16′19″N 1°12′48″E		1070096	Upload Photo	Q26323660
1, High Street	II	1, High Street			26 November 1987	TR2434457135; 51°16′09″N 1°12′53″E		1363312	Upload Photo	Q26645144
Rose Cottage	II	2, High Street			26 November 1987	TR2434457148; 51°16′09″N 1°12′53″E		1070112	Upload Photo	Q26323689
Prospect Place	II	3, 3a, 4 and 5, High Street			26 November 1987	TR2434257163; 51°16′10″N 1°12′53″E		1363313	Upload Photo	Q26645145
6, 7 and 8, High Street	II	6, 7 and 8, High Street			26 November 1987	TR2432757184; 51°16′11″N 1°12′52″E		1203616	Upload Photo	Q26499135
Wingham Lodge	II	9, High Street			17 November 1983	TR2431457217; 51°16′12″N 1°12′52″E		1363322	Upload Photo	Q26645154
Bleak Cottage	II	15, High Street			26 November 1987	TR2431457274; 51°16′14″N 1°12′52″E		1203612	Upload Photo	Q26499131
28, High Street	II	28, High Street			11 November 1963	TR2433757350; 51°16′16″N 1°12′53″E		1070114	Upload Photo	Q26323693
31, High Street	II	31, High Street			26 November 1987	TR2433557393; 51°16′17″N 1°12′53″E		1363314	Upload Photo	Q26645146
32, High Street	II	32, High Street			26 November 1987	TR2433557401; 51°16′18″N 1°12′53″E		1070115	Upload Photo	Q26323695
33, High Street	II	33, High Street			26 November 1987	TR2433657405; 51°16′18″N 1°12′53″E		1363315	Upload Photo	Q26645147
34, High Street	II	34, High Street			13 October 1952	TR2433757425; 51°16′18″N 1°12′53″E		1070116	Upload Photo	Q26323697
35, High Street	II	35, High Street			13 October 1952	TR2433857431; 51°16′19″N 1°12′53″E		1203434	Upload Photo	Q26498970
36 and 37, High Street	II	36 and 37, High Street			13 October 1952	TR2433957438; 51°16′19″N 1°12′53″E		1070117	Upload Photo	Q26323699
38, High Street	II	38, High Street			13 October 1952	TR2434157448; 51°16′19″N 1°12′53″E		1203441	Upload Photo	Q26498976
39, High Street	II	39, High Street			13 October 1952	TR2434257455; 51°16′19″N 1°12′54″E		1363316	Upload Photo	Q26645148
40, High Street	II	40, High Street			13 October 1952	TR2434357466; 51°16′20″N 1°12′54″E		1203446	Upload Photo	Q26498980
41, High Street	II*	41, High Street			13 October 1952	TR2434857490; 51°16′21″N 1°12′54″E		1070118	Upload Photo	Q17557670
Oxenden House	II	43, High Street			26 November 1987	TR2435457509; 51°16′21″N 1°12′54″E		1281676	Upload Photo	Q26570699
44, High Street	II	44, High Street			26 November 1987	TR2435657516; 51°16′21″N 1°12′54″E		1070119	Upload Photo	Q26323702
45, High Street	II	45, High Street			23 April 1980	TR2436057528; 51°16′22″N 1°12′55″E		1203481	Upload Photo	Q26499014
47, 48, 49 and 53, High Street	II	47, 48, 49 and 53, High Street, Canterbury, CT3 1AA			13 October 1952	TR2436557560; 51°16′23″N 1°12′55″E		1070120	Upload Photo	Q26323704
50, High Street	II	50, High Street			13 October 1952	TR2433457548; 51°16′22″N 1°12′53″E		1281622	Upload Photo	Q26570653
Emily Cottage	II	51 and 52, High Street			13 October 1952	TR2433457557; 51°16′23″N 1°12′53″E		1070129	Upload Photo	Q26323723
54 and 55, High Street	II	54 and 55, High Street			13 October 1952	TR2436857586; 51°16′24″N 1°12′55″E		1070121	Upload Photo	Q26323706
56 and 60/61, High Street	II	56 and 60/61, High Street			26 November 1987	TR2436757641; 51°16′25″N 1°12′55″E		1281650	Upload Photo	Q26570675
57, High Street	II	57, High Street			26 November 1987	TR2433157575; 51°16′23″N 1°12′53″E		1281620	Upload Photo	Q26570651
58, High Street	II	58, High Street			26 November 1987	TR2433157583; 51°16′24″N 1°12′53″E		1363320	Upload Photo	Q26645152
62, High Street	II	62, High Street			26 November 1987	TR2433257589; 51°16′24″N 1°12′53″E		1203583	Upload Photo	Q26499104
67, High Street	II	67, High Street			13 October 1952	TR2436157668; 51°16′26″N 1°12′55″E		1070122	Upload Photo	Q26323708
69, High Street	II	69, High Street			11 October 1963	TR2435657691; 51°16′27″N 1°12′55″E		1070123	Upload Photo	Q26323710
Former Post Office	II	71, High Street, CT3 1AA			26 November 1987	TR2435657701; 51°16′27″N 1°12′55″E		1203536	Upload Photo	Q26499061
72, 73, 74, 78, 79 and 80, High Street	II	72, 73, 74, 78, 79 and 80, High Street			26 November 1987	TR2435257726; 51°16′28″N 1°12′55″E		1363317	Upload Photo	Q26645149
81, 82, 83, 87 and 88, High Street	II	81, 82, 83, 87 and 88, High Street			26 November 1987	TR2434857754; 51°16′29″N 1°12′55″E		1203538	Upload Photo	Q26499063
86 and 98, High Street	II	86 and 98, High Street			26 November 1987	TR2433657801; 51°16′31″N 1°12′54″E		1363319	Upload Photo	Q26645151
90, 91 and 92, High Street	II	90, 91 and 92, High Street			26 November 1987	TR2435157777; 51°16′30″N 1°12′55″E		1070124	Upload Photo	Q26323712
93 and 94, High Street	II	93 and 94, High Street			26 November 1987	TR2435557800; 51°16′31″N 1°12′55″E		1203541	Upload Photo	Q26499066
97 and 97a, High Street	II	97 and 97a, High Street			26 November 1987	TR2438457861; 51°16′32″N 1°12′57″E		1070125	Upload Photo	Q26323715
102 and 103, High Street	II	102 and 103, High Street			26 November 1987	TR2439657876; 51°16′33″N 1°12′57″E		1203545	Upload Photo	Q26499070
Beech Tree Cottage	II	104, High Street			11 October 1963	TR2443857909; 51°16′34″N 1°13′00″E		1363318	Upload Photo	Q26645150
113 and 114, High Street	II	113 and 114, High Street			26 April 1982	TR2445857968; 51°16′36″N 1°13′01″E		1070126	Upload Photo	Q26323717
Bleak House	II	High Street			11 October 1963	TR2432057278; 51°16′14″N 1°12′52″E		1070130	Upload Photo	Q26323725
Milestone at 2406 5732	II	High Street			26 November 1987	TR2405357319; 51°16′15″N 1°12′38″E		1070099	Upload Photo	Q26323664
Monument to Elgar Toomer and Rowson Families	II	High Street			26 November 1987	TR2430557731; 51°16′28″N 1°12′52″E		1070127	Upload Photo	Q26323719
Telephone Kiosk (adjacent Former Post Office)	II	High Street, CT3 1AA			1 December 1989	TR2434657700; 51°16′27″N 1°12′54″E		1252762	Upload Photo	Q26544596
The Anchor Inn and Rear Courtyard	II	High Street	inn		1 October 1982	TR2432757626; 51°16′25″N 1°12′53″E		1070128	The Anchor Inn and Rear Courtyard More images	Q26323721
The Central Stores	II	High Street			26 November 1987	TR2435957683; 51°16′27″N 1°12′55″E		1281636	Upload Photo	Q26570664
The Old Manse	II	High Street			13 October 1952	TR2432157745; 51°16′29″N 1°12′53″E		1203561	Upload Photo	Q26499083
The Old Ship	II	High Street, CT3 1BJ	thatched pub		13 October 1952	TR2432557693; 51°16′27″N 1°12′53″E		1281616	The Old Ship More images	Q26570648
The Square	II	17a and 17b, High Street			26 November 1987	TR2434957258; 51°16′13″N 1°12′53″E		1070113	Upload Photo	Q26323691
The White Cottage Restaurant	II	High Street			26 November 1987	TR2437157883; 51°16′33″N 1°12′56″E		1203556	Upload Photo	Q26499078
Wall of Former Market Garden	II	High Street			11 October 1963	TR2433857525; 51°16′22″N 1°12′53″E		1363321	Upload Photo	Q26645153
Perry Farmhouse	II	Perry Road			11 October 1963	TR2530259248; 51°17′16″N 1°13′47″E		1281553	Upload Photo	Q26570589
Highland Cottage	II	Preston Hill			26 November 1987	TR2459458416; 51°16′50″N 1°13′09″E		1070100	Upload Photo	Q26323666
Canon House Canon Villa	II	School Lane			11 October 1963	TR2425557298; 51°16′14″N 1°12′49″E		1203698	Upload Photo	Q26499213
The Vicarage	II*	School Lane			11 October 1963	TR2426057347; 51°16′16″N 1°12′49″E		1070101	Upload Photo	Q17557668
Wall Attached and About 30 Metres to West of Wingham Vicarage	II	School Lane			11 October 1963	TR2422957349; 51°16′16″N 1°12′47″E		1070102	Upload Photo	Q26323668
Barn About 20 Metres South of Little Twitham Farmhouse	II	Staple Road			26 November 1987	TR2626456715; 51°15′53″N 1°14′31″E		1363344	Upload Photo	Q26645174
Barn on North Side of Farmyard at Twitham Farm	II	Staple Road			3 March 1989	TR2602456758; 51°15′55″N 1°14′19″E		1070081	Upload Photo	Q26323628
Brook Farmhouse	II	Staple Road			11 October 1963	TR2611257371; 51°16′14″N 1°14′25″E		1070103	Upload Photo	Q26323670
Dambridge House	II	Staple Road			11 October 1963	TR2493557183; 51°16′10″N 1°13′23″E		1315885	Upload Photo	Q26602227
Little Twitham Farmhouse	II	Staple Road			26 November 1987	TR2627956742; 51°15′54″N 1°14′32″E		1203699	Upload Photo	Q26499214
Oasthouse 30 Metres to North of Dambridge Farmhouse	II	Staple Road			14 January 1991	TR2493857223; 51°16′11″N 1°13′24″E		1070082	Upload Photo	Q26323631
Old Alms House	II	Watercress Lane, Wingham Well, CT3 1NS			26 November 1987	TR2364156784; 51°15′59″N 1°12′16″E		1149365	Upload Photo	Q26442279
Tudor House	II	Watercress Lane			11 October 1963	TR2368356771; 51°15′58″N 1°12′18″E		1315887	Upload Photo	Q26602229
Watercress Cottages	II	Watercress Lane			26 November 1987	TR2364856650; 51°15′54″N 1°12′16″E		1070104	Upload Photo	Q26323672
Wenderton Farmhouse	II	Wenderton			26 November 1987	TR2438858661; 51°16′58″N 1°12′59″E		1203801	Upload Photo	Q26499311
Wood Cottage	II	Wenderton			26 November 1987	TR2373359210; 51°17′17″N 1°12′26″E		1363345	Upload Photo	Q26645175
Barn About 10 Metres South West of Trapham Farmhouse	II	Wingham Green			2 October 1985	TR2309956985; 51°16′06″N 1°11′48″E		1363346	Upload Photo	Q26645176
Rat's Castle	II	Wingham Green			26 November 1987	TR2352756469; 51°15′49″N 1°12′09″E		1281529	Upload Photo	Q26570570
The Green	II	Wingham Green			11 October 1963	TR2353857262; 51°16′14″N 1°12′12″E		1070105	Upload Photo	Q26323674
Trapham Farmhouse	II	Wingham Green			26 November 1987	TR2312257018; 51°16′07″N 1°11′50″E		1203802	Upload Photo	Q26499312
Barn About 15 Metres South East of Wingham Well House	II	Wingham Well			26 November 1987	TR2311256636; 51°15′55″N 1°11′48″E		1203808	Upload Photo	Q26499316
Wingham Well House	II	Wingham Well			11 October 1963	TR2309156654; 51°15′55″N 1°11′47″E		1070106	Upload Photo	Q26323676
Former the Eight Bells	II	Wingham Well Lane, Wingham Well, CT3 1NW			26 November 1987	TR2322056688; 51°15′56″N 1°11′54″E		1363309	Upload Photo	Q26645141

== See also ==
- Grade I listed buildings in Kent
- Grade II* listed buildings in Kent

== Sources ==
- Newman, John (2013) [1969], Kent: North-East and East, The Buildings of England, New Haven and London: Yale University Press, ISBN 978-0-300-18506-5
