= Listed buildings in Upper Hardres =

Civil Parish in Kent, England

Upper Hardres is a village and civil parish in the City of Canterbury district of Kent, England. It contains 24 listed buildings that are recorded in the National Heritage List for England. Of these one is grade I, one is grade II* and 22 are grade II.

This list is based on the information retrieved online from Historic England.

== Key ==
Grade	Criteria
I	Buildings that are of exceptional interest
II*	Particularly important buildings of more than special interest
II	Buildings that are of special interest

== Listing ==
Name	Grade	Location	Type	Completed (Note: The date given is the date used by Historic England as significant for the initial building or that of an important part in the structure's description.)	Date designated	Grid ref. (Note: The grid reference is based on the British national grid reference system, sometimes known as OSGB36, used by the Ordnance Survey.) Geo-coordinates	Notes	Entry number (Note: The "List Entry Number" is a unique number assigned to each listed building and scheduled monument by Historic England.)	Image	Wikidata
Church of St Peter and St Paul	I		church building		30 January 1967	TR1527950734; 51°12′55″N 1°04′52″E		1045850	Church of St Peter and St Paul More images	Q17529459
Little Bursted Farmhouse	II				30 January 1967	TR1649250016; 51°12′30″N 1°05′53″E		1370042	Upload Photo	Q26651302
Little Bossingham Farmhouse	II	Bossingham, Little Bossingham Farm			14 March 1980	TR1495849204; 51°12′06″N 1°04′32″E		1085507	Upload Photo	Q26372903
Long Cottage	II	Bossingham Street, Bossingham			14 March 1980	TR1508048959; 51°11′58″N 1°04′38″E		1045841	Upload Photo	Q26297950
York Cottage	II	Bossingham Street, Bossingham			14 March 1980	TR1509048991; 51°11′59″N 1°04′39″E		1085513	Upload Photo	Q26372935
Broxhall Farmhouse	II	Broxhall Road, Broxhall Farm			14 March 1980	TR1581851346; 51°13′14″N 1°05′21″E		1370008	Upload Photo	Q26651273
Great Palmstead Farmhouse	II	Great Palmstead Farm			14 March 1980	TR1665548258; 51°11′33″N 1°05′57″E		1370045	Upload Photo	Q26651305
Barn at Hardres Court	II*	Hardres Court			14 March 1980	TR1529650678; 51°12′53″N 1°04′53″E		1085505	Upload Photo	Q17557047
Gardener's Cottage	II	Hardres Court			14 March 1980	TR1524750679; 51°12′53″N 1°04′50″E		1336577	Upload Photo	Q26621059
The Manor House	II	Hardres Court Road, The Manor House			29 September 1952	TR1557850259; 51°12′39″N 1°05′06″E		1085512	Upload Photo	Q26372931
Dane Cottage	II	Hogg Lane			14 March 1980	TR1434050845; 51°13′00″N 1°04′04″E		1085508	Upload Photo	Q26372910
Lynsore Bottom Farmhouse	II	Lynsore Bottom			14 March 1980	TR1632349573; 51°12′16″N 1°05′43″E		1336578	Upload Photo	Q26621060
Tudor House Farm	II	Lynsore Bottom			14 March 1980	TR1637849540; 51°12′15″N 1°05′46″E		1085514	Upload Photo	Q26372940
Walnut Tree Farmhouse	II	Lynsore Bottom			14 March 1980	TR1632249557; 51°12′15″N 1°05′43″E		1045848	Upload Photo	Q26297958
Lynsore Court	II	Lynsore Court			14 March 1980	TR1630248840; 51°11′52″N 1°05′41″E		1085506	Upload Photo	Q26372898
Cottage Farmhouse	II	Mann's Hill, Bossingham			14 March 1980	TR1523748801; 51°11′52″N 1°04′46″E		1085509	Upload Photo	Q26372915
Great Bossingham Farmhouse	II	Mann's Hill, Great Bossingham Farm			14 March 1980	TR1511448966; 51°11′58″N 1°04′40″E		1085510	Upload Photo	Q26372921
Maytree Farmhouse and Maytree Cottage	II	Mann's Hill, Bossingham			14 March 1980	TR1535948716; 51°11′49″N 1°04′52″E		1045867	Upload Photo	Q26297975
Court Lodge Farmhouse	II	Manns Hill, Bossingham, CT4 6EB			14 March 1980	TR1515848889; 51°11′55″N 1°04′42″E		1370032	Upload Photo	Q26651294
Clambercrown	II	Quilters Wood			14 March 1980	TR1667448625; 51°11′45″N 1°05′59″E		1085589	Upload Photo	Q26373333
Hog Lane Cottage	II	1 and 2, Stone Street			14 March 1980	TR1381250532; 51°12′50″N 1°03′36″E		1045837	Upload Photo	Q26297943
Great Catt's Farmhouse	II	Stone Street, Great Catt's Farm			16 December 1975	TR1440651405; 51°13′18″N 1°04′09″E		1052262	Upload Photo	Q26304057
Pear Tree Farmhouse	II	Stone Street			14 March 1980	TR1385250932; 51°13′03″N 1°03′39″E		1085511	Upload Photo	Q26372927
Japonica and Dormer Cottage	II	The Street, Bossingham			14 March 1980	TR1506748984; 51°11′58″N 1°04′37″E		1370040	Upload Photo	Q26651300

== See also ==
- Grade I listed buildings in Kent
- Grade II* listed buildings in Kent

== Sources ==
- Newman, John (2013) [1969], Kent: North-East and East, The Buildings of England, New Haven and London: Yale University Press, ISBN 978-0-300-18506-5
