= Listed buildings in Lydden =

Historic structures in Kent, England

Lydden is a village and civil parish in the Dover District of Kent, England. It contains seven listed buildings that are recorded in the National Heritage List for England. Of these one is grade II* and six are grade II.

This list is based on the information retrieved online from Historic England.

== Key ==
Grade	Criteria
I	Buildings that are of exceptional interest
II*	Particularly important buildings of more than special interest
II	Buildings that are of special interest

== Listing ==
Name	Grade	Location	Type	Completed (Note: The date given is the date used by Historic England as significant for the initial building or that of an important part in the structure's description.)	Date designated	Grid ref. (Note: The grid reference is based on the British national grid reference system, sometimes known as OSGB36, used by the Ordnance Survey.) Geo-coordinates	Notes	Entry number (Note: The "List Entry Number" is a unique number assigned to each listed building and scheduled monument by Historic England.)	Image	Wikidata
Anne Cottage	II	75, Canterbury Road			28 May 1987	TR2622245405; 51°09′47″N 1°14′03″E		1363385	Upload Photo	Q26645213
138 and 140, Canterbury Road	II	138 and 140, Canterbury Road			31 July 1975	TR2641545415; 51°09′47″N 1°14′13″E		1356611	Upload Photo	Q26639251
Bell Inn	II	Canterbury Road	inn		4 November 1976	TR2610745406; 51°09′47″N 1°13′57″E		1070027	Bell Inn More images	Q26323540
Little Watersend	II	Canterbury Road			28 May 1987	TR2760644904; 51°09′29″N 1°15′13″E		1067675	Upload Photo	Q26320479
Lydden Court Farmhouse	II	Canterbury Road			22 August 1962	TR2635745672; 51°09′56″N 1°14′11″E		1070028	Upload Photo	Q26323542
Wellington House	II	Canterbury Road			22 August 1962	TR2619245389; 51°09′47″N 1°14′01″E		1067690	Upload Photo	Q26320491
Church of St Mary Church of St Mary Virgin	II*	Church Lane	church building		22 August 1962	TR2642945710; 51°09′57″N 1°14′14″E		1342746	Church of St Mary Church of St Mary Virgin More images	Q17557859

== See also ==
- Grade I listed buildings in Kent
- Grade II* listed buildings in Kent

== Sources ==
- Newman, John (2013) [1969], Kent: North-East and East, The Buildings of England, New Haven and London: Yale University Press, ISBN 978-0-300-18506-5
