= Listed buildings in Tilmanstone =

Civil Parish in Kent, England

Tilmanstone is a village and civil parish in the Dover District of Kent, England. It contains 34 listed buildings that are recorded in the National Heritage List for England. Of these one is grade I, three are grade II* and 30 are grade II.

This list is based on the information retrieved online from Historic England.

== Key ==
Grade	Criteria
I	Buildings that are of exceptional interest
II*	Particularly important buildings of more than special interest
II	Buildings that are of special interest

== Listing ==
Name	Grade	Location	Type	Completed (Note: The date given is the date used by Historic England as significant for the initial building or that of an important part in the structure's description.)	Date designated	Grid ref. (Note: The grid reference is based on the British national grid reference system, sometimes known as OSGB36, used by the Ordnance Survey.) Geo-coordinates	Notes	Entry number (Note: The "List Entry Number" is a unique number assigned to each listed building and scheduled monument by Historic England.)	Image	Wikidata
Thornton Farmhouse and Forecourt Wall	II				24 March 1987	TR2930052201; 51°13′23″N 1°16′57″E		1247712	Upload Photo	Q26539997
Tilmanstone War Memorial	II	Deal, CT14 0JQ	war memorial		15 September 2016	TR3014051280; 51°12′52″N 1°17′38″E		1437924	Tilmanstone War Memorial More images	Q66477915
Chapel Farmhouse	II	Lower Street			24 March 1987	TR3047051052; 51°12′44″N 1°17′54″E		1263966	Upload Photo	Q26554711
Vine Farmhouse	II	Lower Street			24 March 1987	TR3042350825; 51°12′36″N 1°17′51″E		1247713	Upload Photo	Q26539998
Barn About 10 Metres North of North Court	II	North Court Lane, North Court			24 March 1987	TR3018251948; 51°13′13″N 1°17′42″E		1247715	Upload Photo	Q26540000
North Court	II	North Court Lane, North Court			24 March 1987	TR3016151922; 51°13′12″N 1°17′41″E		1247714	Upload Photo	Q26539999
Keepers Cottage	II	Pike Road			24 March 1987	TR2944251701; 51°13′06″N 1°17′03″E		1247716	Upload Photo	Q26540001
Dane Court Lodge	II	School Lane, Dane Court			24 March 1987	TR2987351512; 51°12′59″N 1°17′25″E		1263967	Upload Photo	Q26554712
Christmas Cottage School Cottage	II	School Road			24 March 1987	TR3001851454; 51°12′57″N 1°17′32″E		1247721	Upload Photo	Q26540005
Dane Court	II*	School Road, Dane Court	building		13 October 1952	TR2978151629; 51°13′03″N 1°17′20″E		1247718	Dane Court More images	Q17557793
Golden Bell	II	School Road			24 March 1987	TR3011251445; 51°12′57″N 1°17′37″E		1247752	Upload Photo	Q26540032
Laundry Cottage	II	School Road			24 March 1987	TR3009651424; 51°12′56″N 1°17′36″E		1247760	Upload Photo	Q26540040
Oast Cottages	II	School Road			24 March 1987	TR3013751430; 51°12′56″N 1°17′38″E		1263968	Upload Photo	Q26554713
The Old School	II	School Road			24 March 1987	TR3001751482; 51°12′58″N 1°17′32″E		1247719	Upload Photo	Q26540003
St Marys Grove	II	St Marys Grove			24 March 1987	TR3025551519; 51°12′59″N 1°17′44″E		1247717	Upload Photo	Q26540002
Church House	II	Upper Street			11 October 1963	TR3024551483; 51°12′58″N 1°17′44″E		1247722	Upload Photo	Q26540006
Church of St Andrew	I	Upper Street	church building		11 October 1963	TR3021251470; 51°12′58″N 1°17′42″E		1247778	Church of St Andrew More images	Q17529753
Forge Cottage	II	Upper Street			24 March 1987	TR3018751284; 51°12′52″N 1°17′40″E		1263969	Upload Photo	Q26554714
Headstones to Gibon and Mary Rammell About 15 Metres West of Church of St Andrew	II	Upper Street			24 March 1987	TR3018951451; 51°12′57″N 1°17′41″E		1263970	Upload Photo	Q26554715
The Ravens	II	Upper Street			24 March 1987	TR3016051298; 51°12′52″N 1°17′39″E		1247764	Upload Photo	Q26540043
Three Headstones About 2 to 10 Metres South of Church of St Andrew	II	Upper Street			24 March 1987	TR3021651455; 51°12′57″N 1°17′42″E		1247723	Upload Photo	Q26540007
Three Headstones About 6 Metres South West of Church of St Andrew	II	Upper Street			24 March 1987	TR3020451454; 51°12′57″N 1°17′42″E		1247780	Upload Photo	Q26540058
Barn About 50 Metres East of Malmains Farmhouse	II	Waldershare			24 March 1987	TR2988149132; 51°11′43″N 1°17′20″E		1263973	Upload Photo	Q26554718
Church of All Saints	II*	Waldershare	church building		11 October 1963	TR2970948277; 51°11′15″N 1°17′09″E		1247812	Church of All Saints More images	Q4729536
Garden Walls About 60 Metres North East of Home Farmhouse	II	Waldershare			24 March 1987	TR2927448304; 51°11′17″N 1°16′47″E		1247799	Upload Photo	Q26540075
Granary About 50 Metres South of Home Farmhouse	II	Waldershare			24 March 1987	TR2914648208; 51°11′14″N 1°16′40″E		1263971	Upload Photo	Q26554716
Granary/outbuilding About 100 Metres South East of Riding School	II	Waldershare			24 March 1987	TR2909848615; 51°11′27″N 1°16′38″E		1247726	Upload Photo	Q26540009
Home Farm Cottage	II	Waldershare			24 March 1987	TR2915948151; 51°11′12″N 1°16′40″E		1263929	Upload Photo	Q26554677
Kennels Building Laundry Cottage and the Spinney	II	Waldershare			24 March 1987	TR2917448728; 51°11′30″N 1°16′42″E		1247811	Upload Photo	Q26540085
Malmains Farmhouse and Shareborne House and Wall Attached	II*	Waldershare			13 October 1952	TR2981649135; 51°11′43″N 1°17′16″E		1263941	Upload Photo	Q17557820
Tomb Chest and Headstone About 2 Metres South of Church of All Saints	II	Waldershare			24 March 1987	TR2971648267; 51°11′15″N 1°17′09″E		1247727	Upload Photo	Q95115410
Home Farmhouse	II	Waldershare Park			11 October 1963	TR2919948260; 51°11′15″N 1°16′43″E		1247876	Upload Photo	Q26540142
Ice House in Waldershare Park at Tr 289 486	II	Waldershare Park			24 March 1987	TR2889648624; 51°11′28″N 1°16′28″E		1263972	Upload Photo	Q26554717
Riding School and Stable Courtyard, Waldershare Park	II	Waldershare Park, Waldershare			24 March 1987	TR2908348792; 51°11′33″N 1°16′38″E		1247725	Upload Photo	Q26540008

== See also ==
- Grade I listed buildings in Kent
- Grade II* listed buildings in Kent

== Sources ==
- Newman, John (2013) [1969], Kent: North-East and East, The Buildings of England, New Haven and London: Yale University Press, ISBN 978-0-300-18506-5
