= St Mary's Church, Leigh =

Parish church in Leigh, Kent, England

Coordinates: 51.197760°N 0.215299°E

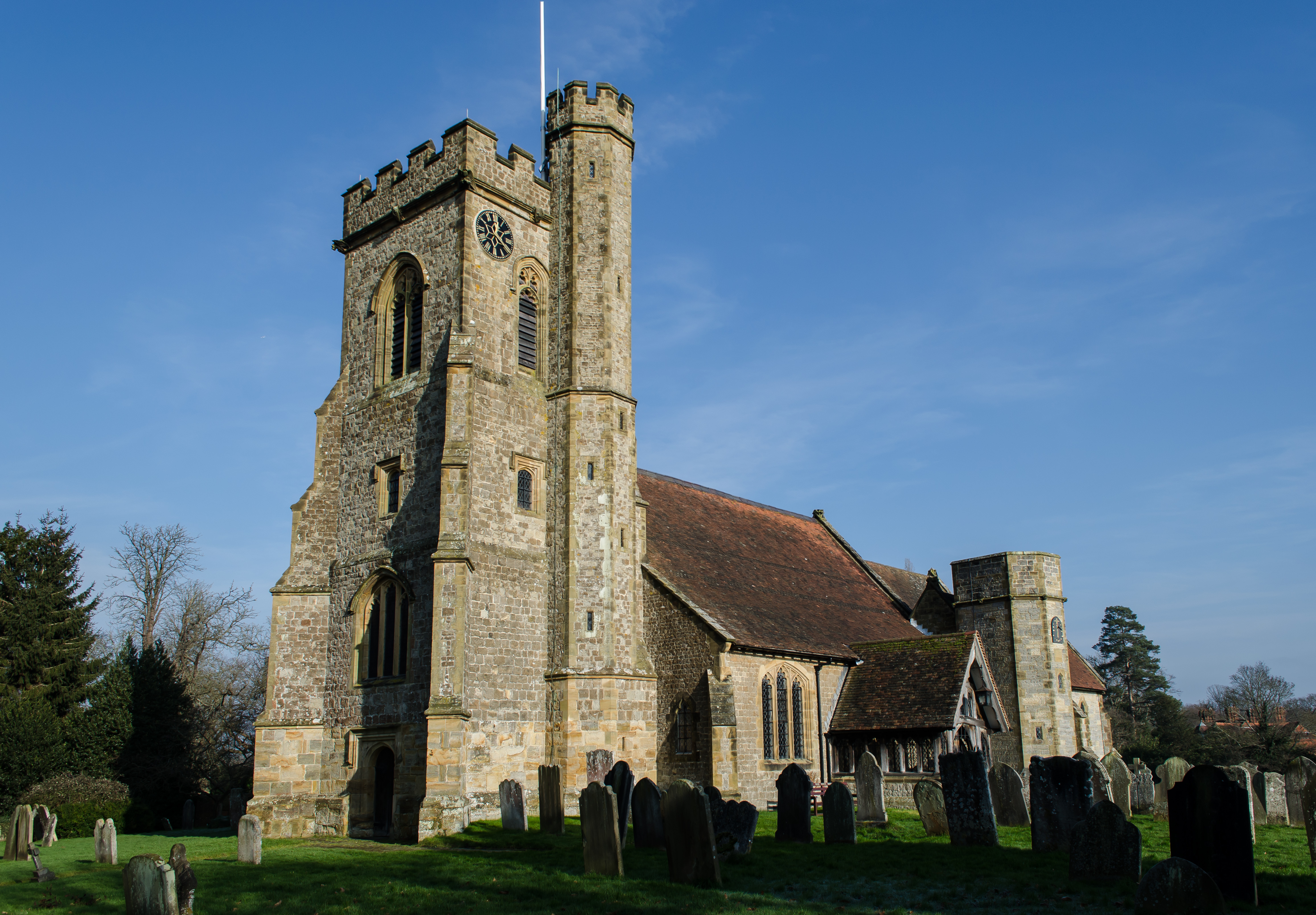

- Location within Kent
- OS grid reference: TQ 54876 46618
- Location: Leigh, Kent
- Country: England
- Denomination: Anglican
- Website: stmarysleigh.2day.uk

History
- Status: Parish church

Architecture
- Functional status: Active
- Heritage designation: Grade II*
- Designated: 10 September 1954
- Completed: 13th century

Administration
- Province: Canterbury
- Diocese: Rochester
- Archdeaconry: Tonbridge
- Deanery: Tonbridge
- Parish: Leigh

St Mary's Church is a parish church in Leigh, Kent. The current church was originally completed in the 13th century, although a church is believed to have stood on the same site for over a thousand years. It is a Grade II* listed building.

== Building ==
It occupies the highest point of the village, overlooking the village green.

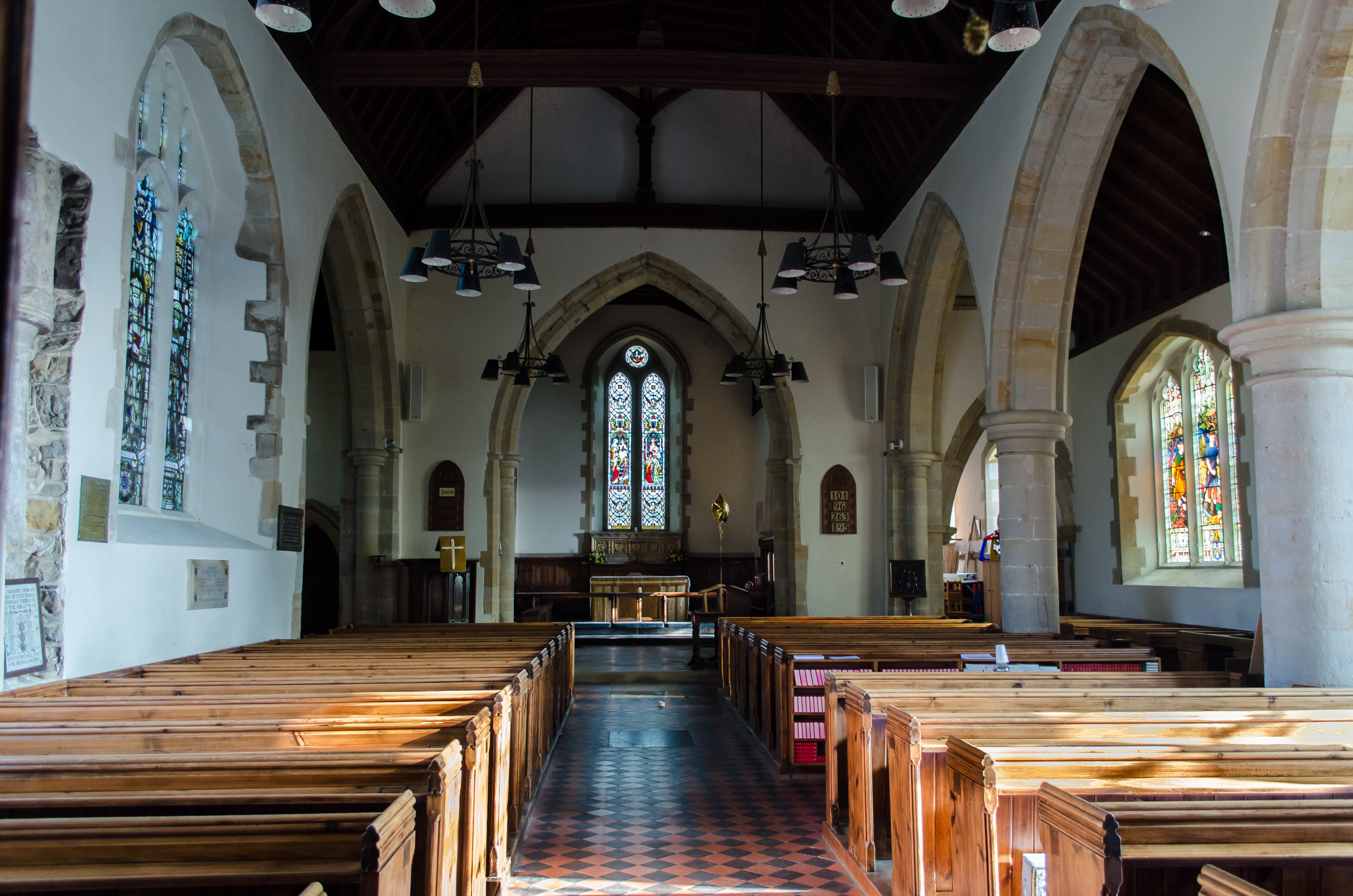
Interior

== History ==
The present parish church was built in the 13th century, although a church is believed to have stood in a similar position for over a thousand years.

The church was reconstructed in the 19th century by two architects, George Devey and Charles Baily, who had been employed by the Lay Rector (Lord de Lisle) and the Parish respectively, the two parties being responsible for different parts of the building. The two architects used different types of stone to reconstruct the building.

== See also ==
- Grade II* listed buildings in Sevenoaks District
