= Sandwich Guildhall =

Municipal building in Sandwich, Kent, England

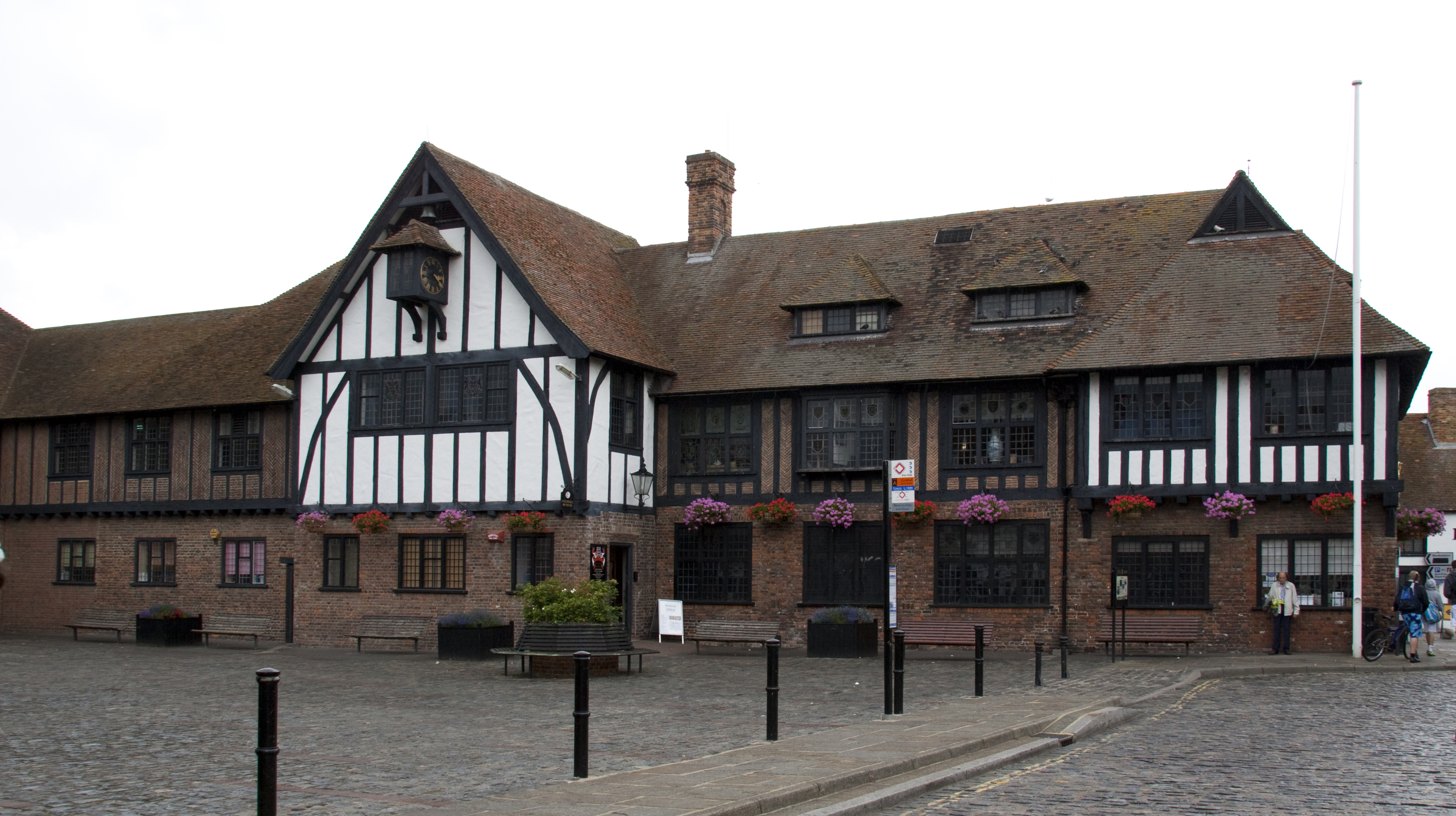
- Sandwich Guildhall

- Shown in Kent
- 51.2748°N 1.3387°E
- Location: Cattle Market, Sandwich

History
- Built: 1579

Site notes
- Architectural style: Medieval style

Listed Building – Grade II*
- Official name: The Guildhall
- Designated: 19 May 1950
- Reference no.: 1069731

Sandwich Guildhall is a municipal building in the Cattle Market, Sandwich, Kent, England. The structure, which accommodates the offices and meeting place of Sandwich Town Council, is a Grade II* listed building.

== History ==
The first guildhall was constructed between King Street and The Chain, in the area behind the Old Parsonage, while a second guildhall was erected in what is now St Peter's Churchyard. The current building was designed in the medieval style, built in brick and was completed in 1579.

The design of the original building (the central and right hand sections of the current structure) involved an asymmetrical main frontage of six bays facing onto the guildhall forecourt. The central section, which was projected forward, featured three casement windows on the ground floor, two closely-set casement windows amidst timber framing on the second floor, and a gable containing a projecting clock above. The right-hand section of five bays was fenestrated by tri-partite windows on both floors; the last two bays on the first floor were timber-framed and jettied out over the pavement. Internally, the principal rooms were the council chamber, the court room and the mayor's parlour. The council chamber was decorated with paintings depicting the Glorious First of June and the court room was decorated with wood panelling installed in 1607.

The building was encased in yellow brick in 1812. A stained glass window, depicting Queen Elizabeth I arriving at Sandown Gate in Sandwich in August 1573, was installed in the court room in 1906. The yellow brick encasement was removed in 1912, when the left-hand-section was also added. The left-hand section of five bays was also fenestrated by tri-partite windows on both floors in a similar style. Internally, the principal new room was a large assembly room known as the Jury Room.

The guildhall was an important venue for public events: the British Union of Fascists's Director of Propaganda, William Joyce (Lord Haw Haw), gave a speech to a large audience there in the mid-1930s. The building was extended again with the addition of a new structure on the south-west side of the Guildhall Forecourt known as the New Hall in 1973. This structure, of five bays, contained a central section of three bays, which was slightly projected forward and featured a carriageway opening on the ground floor and a tri-partite French door and a balcony on the first floor. Internally, it created extensive additional office provision for the council.

The guildhall continued to serve as the headquarters of the borough council for much of the twentieth century but ceased to be the local seat of government when the enlarged Dover District Council was formed in 1974. However, the building subsequently became the meeting place of Sandwich Town Council. It also served as a local history museum: items accessioned to the collection included original copies of Magna Carta and the Charter of the Forest dating from 1300. An extensive programme of refurbishment works, including the installation of new display cases for these documents, was funded by the Heritage Lottery Fund and completed in May 2017. Sandwich Town Council acquired ownership of the guildhall from Dover District Council in July 2018.

In 2025, the Sandwich Guildhall Museum took part in a project financed by the National Lottery Heritage Fund called "Let's Do the Time Walk Again!" The project was created by Canterbury Christ Church University, working with four museums: Sandwich Guildhall, Deal Maritime and Local History Museum, Ramsgate Clock House Museum and Dickens House Museum. The project was designed to digitise archives from the early 19th century to the mid 20th century and to connect the towns together. It was set to last two years and required the involvement of volunteers.

Works of art in the guildhall include a series of four panels by Willem van de Velde the Younger depicting Queen Catherine of Braganza's visit to Sandwich in May 1672, and another series of four panels by the same artist depicting the Battle of Solebay off the Suffolk coast in June 1672.

== See also ==
- Grade II* listed buildings in Dover (district)
