= Boer War Memorial Arch, Brompton Barracks =

War memorial in Kent, England

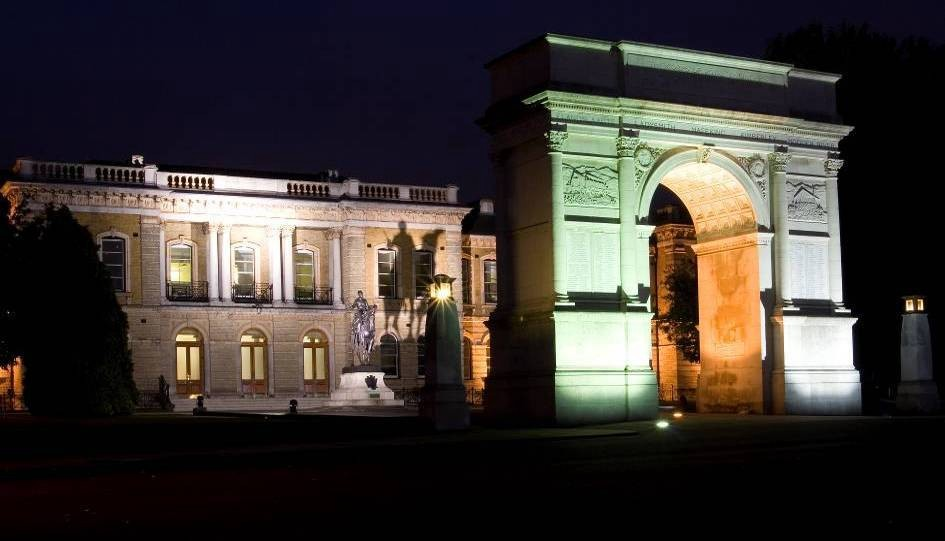
- The Royal School of Military Engineering (left), and a front view of the War Memorial (right)

- Location within England

General information
- Location: Pasley Road, Brompton, England
- Coordinates: 51.393°N 0.5345°E
- Year built: 1902

Technical details
- Material: Stone, Italian marble, limestone

Design and construction
- Architect: Ingress Bell
- Architecture firm: Messr Longley and Co of Crawley

Listed Building – Grade II*
- Official name: Boer War Memorial Arch, Brompton Barracks
- Designated: 8 July 1998
- Reference no.: 1375606

Boer War Memorial Arch is a Grade II* listed war memorial on Pasley Street in the town of Brompton, in Kent, England. It commemorates the corps of Royal Engineers who died during the Second Boer War.

== History ==
The cenotaph was built after the Second Boer War for corps of Royal Engineers who died in the conflict. and raised by a public subscription from the mayor. It was designed by Ingress Bell, of Messr Longley and Co of Crawley, and manufactured by Mr T Elsley Limited. The memorial was unveiled on 26 July 1905 by Edward VII. On 8 July 1998, the Boer War Memorial Arch was designated a Grade II* listed building.

== Design ==
The memorial is a stone arch, upon two Corinthian columns and a limestone ashlar, the centre with round archway set forward, to the corners to an entablature inscribed with Royal Engineer's Boer War Battles. Beneath these are marble panels upon which are engraved the names of those who died.

The war memorial is in front of a bronze statue of Kitchener of Khartoum.

== See also ==
- Grade II* listed war memorials in England
