= Leybourne Castle =

Castle in Leybourne, Kent, England

Coordinates: 51°18′15.79″N 0°25′15.20″E

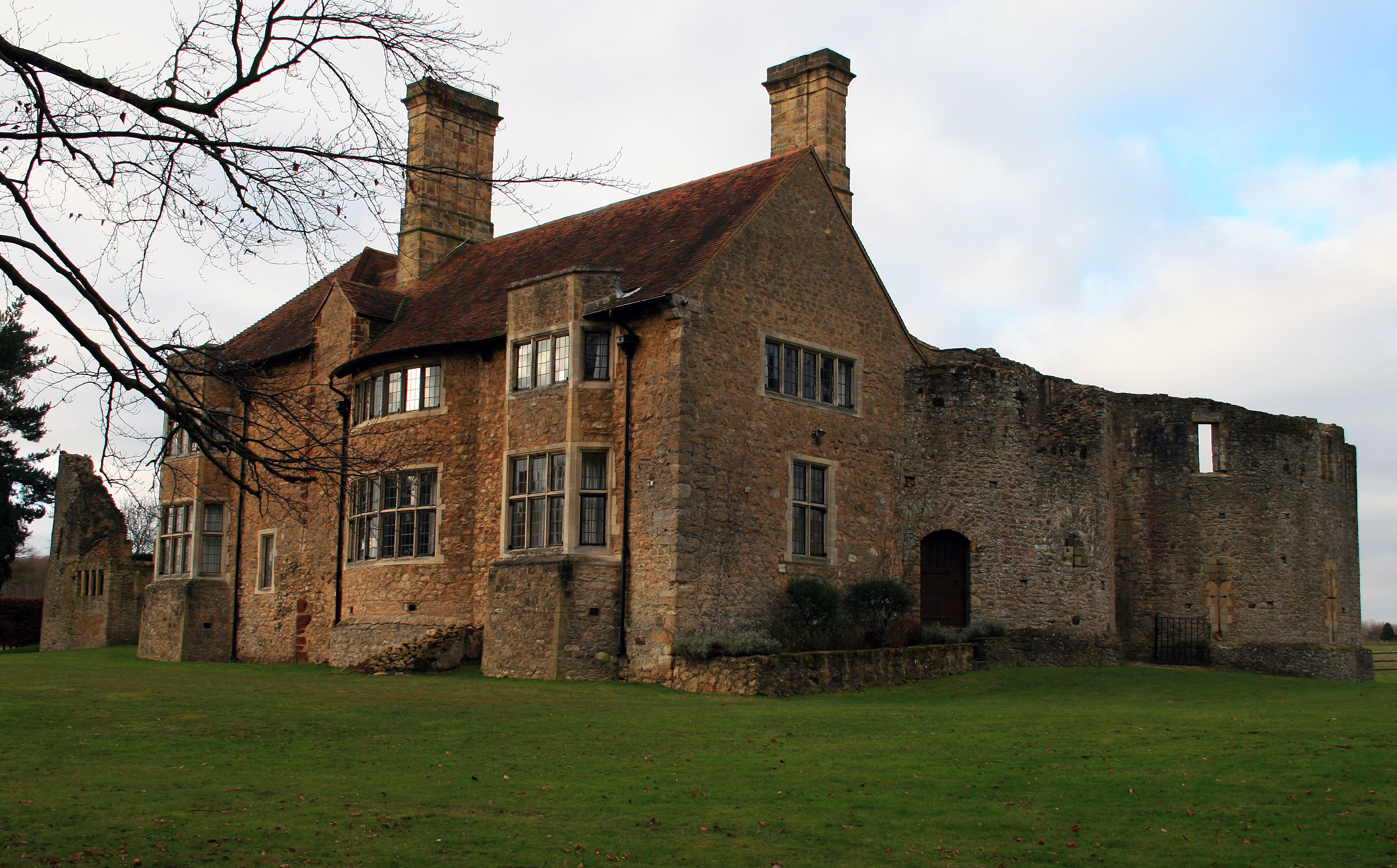
Leybourne Castle

Leybourne Castle is a 13th-century castle in the parish of Leybourne, Kent, west of Castle Way.

== History ==
The two semi circular bastions of the twin towered gatehouse built in 1275 remain and are incorporated into a Tudor farmhouse that was extensively rebuilt around 1930. Some evidence of circular earthworks also remains. The curtain wall was extant until the 18th century but now none of it remains. It has strong links with the similar church very near it. Leybourne Castle is a Grade II* listed building. Currently it is private property and inaccessible to the public.

== See also ==
- Roger de Leybourne
