= St. Mary the Virgin, Chiddingstone =

Coordinates: 51.1863°N 0.1462°E

- Church of the Blessed Virgin Mary
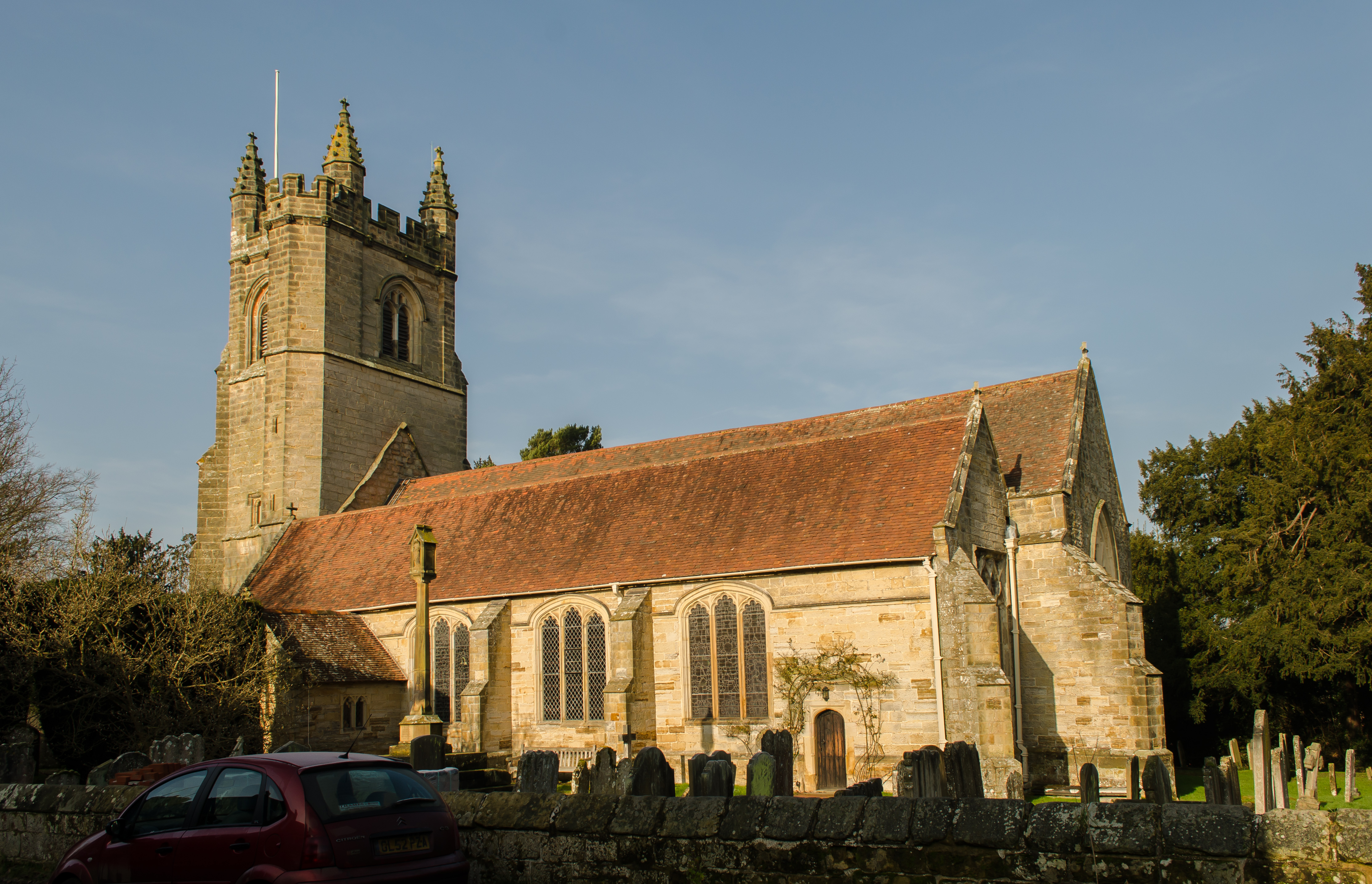
- St. Mary the Virgin
- St. Mary the Virgin, Chiddingstone
- OS grid reference: TQ 50086 45193
- Country: England
- Denomination: Church of England
- Previous denomination: Roman Catholic
- Website: www.chiddingstonechurches.org.uk

History
- Status: Parish Church
- Consecrated: 13th Century

Architecture
- Functional status: Active
- Heritage designation: Grade II*
- Designated: 10 September 1954
- Architect: various
- Style: Norman, Gothic
- Completed: 13th Century

Administration
- Province: Canterbury
- Diocese: Rochester

Clergy
- Rector: Lisa Cornell

St. Mary the Virgin is a parish church in the united benefice of Chiddingstone, Penshurst, Chiddingstone Causeway and Fordcombe in the Anglican Diocese of Rochester. It is a Grade II* listed building with Historic England.
