= The Vine Farm, Northbourne =

Farmhouse in Northbourne, Kent, England

The Vine Farm
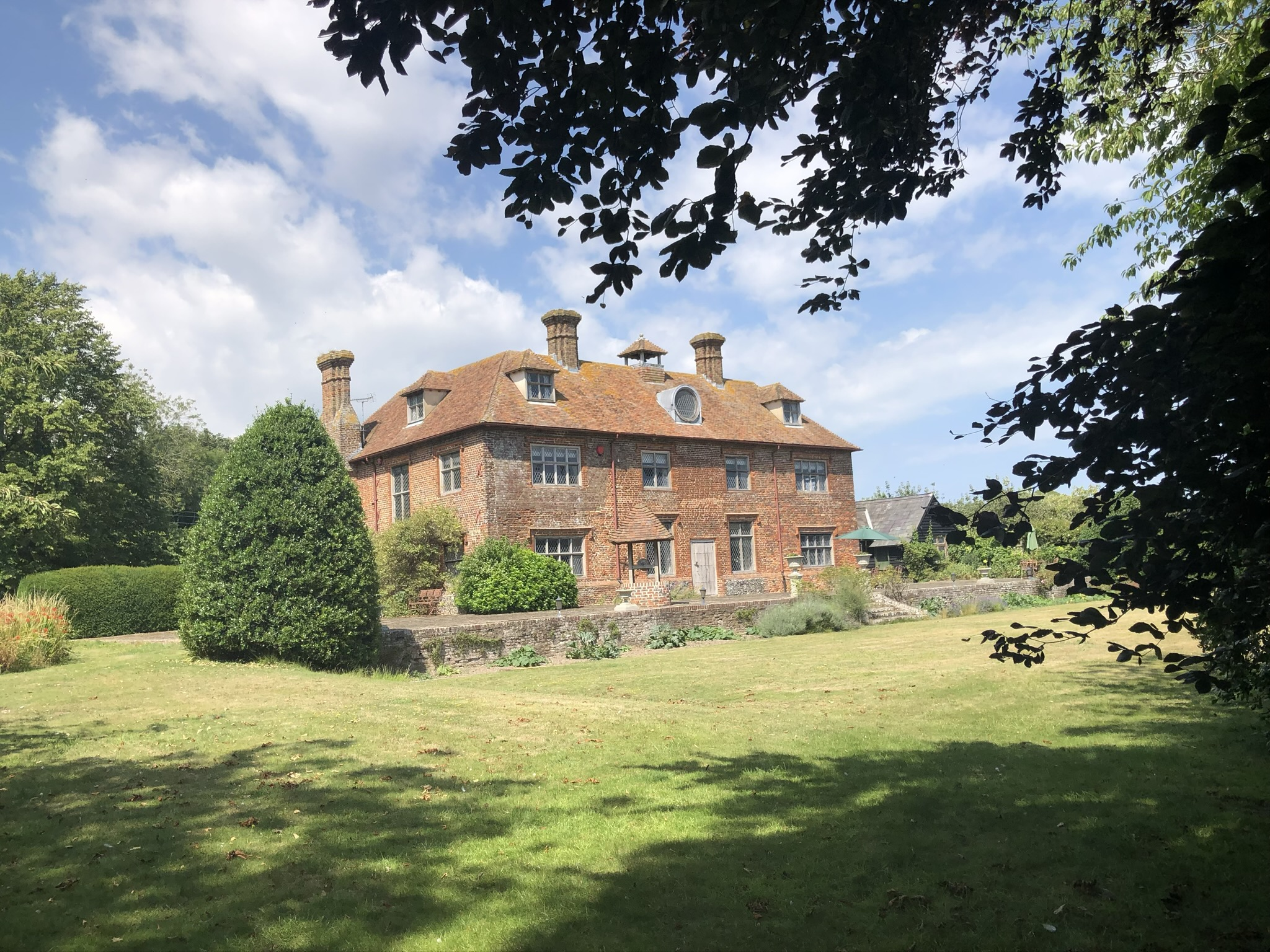
- South side of the house

- Location within Kent

General information
- Location: Northbourne, England
- Coordinates: 51.2204°N 1.3413°E
- Completed: 1600s

The Vine Farm, formerly The Vine, is a Jacobean country house in Northbourne, Kent, England. It is a Grade II* listed building, with a grade II listed cottage and walls.

== Building ==
The house was constructed in the 17th century. It is built to a simple E plan, with two projecting wings. The left hand wing is a 19th century rebuild which was built on the original foundations by Frederick Morrice, who also worked on nearby Betteshanger House.
