= Grade II* listed buildings in Kent =

Kent shown within England

The county of Kent is divided into 13 districts. The districts of Kent are Ashford, Canterbury, Dartford, Dover, Folkestone and Hythe, Gravesham, Maidstone, Medway, Tonbridge and Malling, Tunbridge Wells, Sevenoaks, Swale and Thanet.

As there are 979 Grade II* listed buildings in the county they have been split into separate lists for each district.

- Grade II* listed buildings in Ashford (borough)
- Grade II* listed buildings in City of Canterbury
- Grade II* listed buildings in Dartford (borough)
- Grade II* listed buildings in Dover (district)
- Grade II* listed buildings in Folkestone and Hythe
- Grade II* listed buildings in Gravesham
- Grade II* listed buildings in Maidstone (borough)
- Grade II* listed buildings in Medway
- Grade II* listed buildings in Sevenoaks (district)
- Grade II* listed buildings in Swale
- Grade II* listed buildings in Thanet
- Grade II* listed buildings in Tonbridge and Malling
- Grade II* listed buildings in Tunbridge Wells (borough)

== See also ==
- Grade I listed buildings in Kent

== See also ==
- Category:Grade II* listed buildings in Kent
