= Grade II* listed buildings in Tonbridge and Malling =

There are over 20,000 Grade II* listed buildings in England. This page is a list of these buildings in the district of Tonbridge and Malling in Kent.

== Tonbridge and Malling ==
| Name | Location | Type | Completed (Note: The date given is the date used by Historic England as significant for the initial building or that of an important part in the structure's description.) | Date designated | Grid ref. (Note: The grid reference is based on the British national grid reference system, sometimes known as OSGB36, used by the Ordnance Survey.) Geo-coordinates | Entry number (Note: The "List Entry Number" is a unique number assigned to each listed building and scheduled monument by Historic England.) | Image |
|---|---|---|---|---|---|---|---|
| Ford Place and Wall to North | Addington | Farmhouse | 18th century | 1 August 1952 | TQ6365058575; 51°18′10″N 0°20′46″E | 1236317 | Upload Photo |
| Court Farmhouse | Aylesford | Farmhouse | 1952 | 1 August 1952 | TQ7279159047; 51°18′16″N 0°28′39″E | 1070571 | Upload Photo |
| The Chequers Public House | Aylesford | Jettied House | Early 16th century | 1 August 1952 | TQ7291258977; 51°18′13″N 0°28′45″E | 1111803 | The Chequers Public House More images |
| The George House (previously George Inn) | Aylesford | Continuous Jetty House | Mid 16th century | 1 August 1952 | TQ7297358967; 51°18′13″N 0°28′48″E | 1070545 | The George House (previously George Inn) More images |
| Shrine of Our Lady of Mount Carmel and St Simon Stock | Aylesford | Church | 1958-1965 | 23 September 2016 | TQ7243858895; 51°18′11″N 0°28′20″E | 1437906 | Shrine of Our Lady of Mount Carmel and St Simon Stock More images |
| Trinity Court | Aylesford | Row | 1607 | 1 August 1952 | TQ7312159048; 51°18′15″N 0°28′56″E | 1298997 | Trinity Court More images |
| Church of St Peter Ad Vincula | Ditton | Church | 12th century | 25 August 1959 | TQ7098658048; 51°17′45″N 0°27′04″E | 1099197 | Church of St Peter Ad Vincula More images |
| Stream Cottages | Ditton | House | c1480-1500 | 25 February 1987 | TQ7100158162; 51°17′49″N 0°27′05″E | 1070527 | Upload Photo |
| Derbies | East Malling and Larkfield | House | C15/C16 | 12 November 1986 | TQ6943256530; 51°16′58″N 0°25′41″E | 1363131 | Upload Photo |
| Paris Farmhouse | East Malling and Larkfield | House | 16th century | 1 August 1952 | TQ7046256689; 51°17′02″N 0°26′35″E | 1363129 | Upload Photo |
| The Barracks | East Malling and Larkfield | Farmhouse | circa 1380-1400 | 1 August 1952 | TQ6939556552; 51°16′59″N 0°25′39″E | 1070512 | The Barracks More images |
| The Wealden Hall Restaurant | East Malling and Larkfield | Farmhouse | Late 14th century | 25 February 1987 | TQ7035158303; 51°17′54″N 0°26′32″E | 1070501 | The Wealden Hall Restaurant More images |
| 4 and 6 Church Walk | East Malling and Larkfield | Wealden House | Early 15th century | 1 August 1952 | TQ7019857089; 51°17′15″N 0°26′22″E | 1349080 | 4 and 6 Church Walk |
| Church of St Michael | Old Peckham, East Peckham | Parish Church | c. 1300 | 25 August 1959 | TQ6616152169; 51°14′40″N 0°22′45″E | 1363012 | Church of St Michael More images |
| Dower House | East Peckham | House | Possibly earlier this century | 1 August 1952 | TQ6643251704; 51°14′25″N 0°22′58″E | 1299613 | Upload Photo |
| Forge Gate Farmhouse | East Peckham | House | Later wing | 19 April 1985 | TQ6555552494; 51°14′51″N 0°22′15″E | 1185270 | Upload Photo |
| Oast Houses and Granaries at Whitbreads Hop Farm | East Peckham | Oasthouse | Early C20 | 25 August 1959 | TQ6740047504; 51°12′08″N 0°23′41″E | 1070722 | Upload Photo |
| Roydon Hall | East Peckham | Country House | 1535(inscription) | 1 August 1952 | TQ6658151711; 51°14′25″N 0°23′06″E | 1363037 | Roydon Hall More images |
| Church of St Mary | Hadlow | Church | c. 1066 | 20 October 1954 | TQ6345449714; 51°13′24″N 0°20′22″E | 1070466 | Church of St Mary More images |
| Gateway to Hadlow Castle | Hadlow | Gate | c. 1820 | 20 October 1954 | TQ6335149741; 51°13′25″N 0°20′16″E | 1363139 | Gateway to Hadlow Castle More images |
| Hadlow Place | Golden Green, Hadlow | Kitchen | Early/mid 16th century | 20 October 1954 | TQ6293748218; 51°12′36″N 0°19′53″E | 1070457 | Upload Photo |
| North Lodge | Hadlow | Gatehouse | c. 1820 | 20 October 1954 | TQ6336049750; 51°13′25″N 0°20′17″E | 1237277 | North Lodge More images |
| Poplar Court | Golden Green, Hadlow | House | Early/mid 16th century | 20 October 1954 | TQ6457348176; 51°12′33″N 0°21′17″E | 1070420 | Poplar Court More images |
| Ranges round the Stable Yard west of Hadlow Tower, Hadlow Castle | Hadlow | House | 1990 | 19 February 1990 | TQ6343649674; 51°13′22″N 0°20′21″E | 1237300 | Upload Photo |
| South Lodge | Hadlow | Gatehouse | c. 1820 | 20 October 1954 | TQ6334049733; 51°13′24″N 0°20′16″E | 1237249 | Upload Photo |
| Spring Place | Hadlow | House | Mid/late 15th century | 20 October 1954 | TQ6279251063; 51°14′08″N 0°19′50″E | 1236819 | Spring Place |
| The Old Farmhouse | Golden Green, Hadlow | Farmhouse | 17th century | 20 October 1954 | TQ6342848035; 51°12′29″N 0°20′18″E | 1237176 | Upload Photo |
| Nizels Cottage | Hildenborough | House | Mid 17th century | 20 October 1954 | TQ5461950451; 51°13′56″N 0°12′48″E | 1248222 | Upload Photo |
| Old House | Hildenborough | House | Late Medieval | 20 October 1954 | TQ5527248813; 51°13′03″N 0°13′19″E | 1363156 | Upload Photo |
| Ightham Court | Ightham | House | Mid 16th century | 1 August 1952 | TQ5950657559; 51°17′41″N 0°17′11″E | 1071968 | Upload Photo |
| Ightham Place | Ightham | House | Late 18th century | 3 May 1984 | TQ5957756747; 51°17′15″N 0°17′13″E | 1071981 | Ightham Place More images |
| Mote Farm Cottages & Old Laundry Cottage | Ightham | Row | 16th century | 1 August 1952 | TQ5838753459; 51°15′30″N 0°16′07″E | 1362411 | Mote Farm Cottages & Old Laundry Cottage More images |
| Old Forge House | Ightham | Continuous Jetty House | 16th century | 1 August 1952 | TQ5955256739; 51°17′15″N 0°17′12″E | 1204195 | Old Forge House More images |
| Church of St Peter and St Paul | Leybourne | Church | 12th century | 25 August 1959 | TQ6894958929; 51°18′16″N 0°25′20″E | 1100628 | Church of St Peter and St Paul More images |
| Leybourne Castle | Leybourne | Castle | Early 14th century | 25 August 1959 | TQ6886658910; 51°18′15″N 0°25′16″E | 1363097 | Leybourne Castle More images |
| Church Farmhouse | Offham | Farmhouse | c. 1620 | 1 August 1952 | TQ6598158048; 51°17′51″N 0°22′46″E | 1236003 | Upload Photo |
| Quintain House | Offham | House | c. 1700 | 1 August 1952 | TQ6571357317; 51°17′27″N 0°22′31″E | 1264803 | Quintain House More images |
| The Manor House | Offham | House | 17th century | 1 August 1952 | TQ6583257296; 51°17′26″N 0°22′37″E | 1264775 | Upload Photo |
| Great Comp | Platt | House | Possibly earlier house | 1 August 1952 | TQ6319156760; 51°17′12″N 0°20′20″E | 1071988 | Upload Photo |
| Nepicar House | Platt | House | Earlier | 1 August 1952 | TQ6290658345; 51°18′03″N 0°20′08″E | 1071991 | Nepicar House |
| Clakkers Hall | Plaxtol | Farmhouse | Late C15-early 16th century | 13 July 1973 | TQ6125155496; 51°16′33″N 0°18′38″E | 1281020 | Clakkers Hall |
| Plaxtol Church | Plaxtol | Church | 1649 | 3 May 1984 | TQ6019553640; 51°15′34″N 0°17′40″E | 1072684 | Plaxtol Church More images |
| Rats Castle | Plaxtol | Farmhouse | Possibly 14th century | 1 August 1952 | TQ6255553083; 51°15′13″N 0°19′41″E | 1362027 | Upload Photo |
| Spoute House | Plaxtol | House | c. 1600 | 3 May 1984 | TQ6115053650; 51°15′33″N 0°18′29″E | 1204588 | Upload Photo |
| The Grange | Plaxtol | House | Early 17th century | 1 August 1952 | TQ6043253892; 51°15′42″N 0°17′53″E | 1072687 | Upload Photo |
| Church of St Martin | Ryarsh | Church | 12th century | 25 August 1959 | TQ6723459136; 51°18′24″N 0°23′52″E | 1070477 | Church of St Martin More images |
| Church of Our Lady of the Meadow | Dode, Snodland | Church | 12th century | 25 August 1959 | TQ6685563725; 51°20′53″N 0°23′40″E | 1101756 | Church of Our Lady of the Meadow More images |
| Church of St Benedict | Paddlesworth, Snodland | Church | Early 12th century | 25 August 1959 | TQ6847462116; 51°19′59″N 0°25′01″E | 1363120 | Church of St Benedict More images |
| Mulberry Cottages | Snodland | House | 1932 | 1 August 1952 | TQ7048461815; 51°19′48″N 0°26′45″E | 1070485 | Mulberry Cottages More images |
| Woodlands Farmhouse | Snodland | Farmhouse | c. 1880 | 16 January 1981 | TQ6980761991; 51°19′54″N 0°26′10″E | 1101517 | Woodlands Farmhouse More images |
| Church of St Mary | Stansted | Church | c. 1400 | 25 August 1959 | TQ6073662124; 51°20′08″N 0°18′22″E | 1236153 | Church of St Mary More images |
| Fairseat Manor and Garden Wall to North | Stansted | House | 17th century | 1 August 1952 | TQ6220261440; 51°19′44″N 0°19′36″E | 1236169 | Upload Photo |
| South Ash Manor | Stansted | Jettied House | 16th century | 1 August 1952 | TQ5958863161; 51°20′42″N 0°17′24″E | 1236122 | Upload Photo |
| Church of Saint John the Baptist | Wateringbury | Parish Church | 13th century | 25 August 1959 | TQ6853353674; 51°15′26″N 0°24′50″E | 1070664 | Church of Saint John the Baptist More images |
| Pelican Farmhouse | Wateringbury | House | Later much altered | 1 August 1952 | TQ6924953506; 51°15′20″N 0°25′27″E | 1320018 | Pelican Farmhouse |
| The Tomb of Sir Oliver Style in the Church of Saint John the Baptist Churchyard | Wateringbury | Table Tomb | c. 1702 | 19 April 1985 | TQ6853953645; 51°15′25″N 0°24′50″E | 1320027 | Upload Photo |
| Wateringbury Place | Wateringbury | House | c. 1707 | 1 August 1952 | TQ6843053710; 51°15′28″N 0°24′45″E | 1116485 | Wateringbury Place More images |
| Brome House | West Malling | Bothy | may have been | 1 August 1952 | TQ6793357516; 51°17′31″N 0°24′26″E | 1209103 | Brome House More images |
| Church of the Resurrection of Our Lord Jesus Christ and of the Blessed Virgin Mary, West Malling Abbey | West Malling | Abbey | 1964-1966 | 18 February 1999 | TQ6829757704; 51°17′37″N 0°24′45″E | 1245579 | Upload Photo |
| Douce's Manor | West Malling | House | c. 1776 | 1 August 1952 | TQ6774357320; 51°17′25″N 0°24′15″E | 1209122 | Douce's Manor More images |
| Abbey Tithe Barn then Ewell Monastery Chapel | West Malling | Tithe Barn/Chapel | 15th century | 30 November 1993 | TQ6813257518; 51°17′31″N 0°24′36″E | 1292794 | Abbey Tithe Barn then Ewell Monastery Chapel More images |
| Malling Place | West Malling | House | dates from 1560 | 1 August 1952 | TQ6761957147; 51°17′20″N 0°24′09″E | 1219060 | Malling Place More images |
| Parish Church of St Mary the Virgin | West Malling | Parish Church | Norman | 25 August 1959 | TQ6789957538; 51°17′32″N 0°24′24″E | 1292816 | Parish Church of St Mary the Virgin More images |
| Prior's Cottage the Priors | West Malling | House | 16th century | 30 November 1993 | TQ6803257904; 51°17′44″N 0°24′31″E | 1209113 | Prior's Cottage the Priors More images |
| The Assembly Rooms | West Malling | Assembly Rooms | earlier foundations | 1 August 1952 | TQ6803957858; 51°17′42″N 0°24′32″E | 1218061 | The Assembly Rooms More images |
| The Bakery Restaurant | West Malling | Apartment | Late 16th century | 1 August 1952 | TQ6805857836; 51°17′41″N 0°24′33″E | 1218117 | The Bakery Restaurant More images |
| Went House | West Malling | House | c. 1710 | 1 August 1952 | TQ6833857741; 51°17′38″N 0°24′47″E | 1219391 | Went House More images |
| the Lodge | West Malling | House | Early 19th century | 1 August 1952 | TQ6747056774; 51°17′08″N 0°24′00″E | 1291654 | Upload Photo |
| Oxon Hoath | West Peckham | House | Remains of late 16th century | 1 August 1952 | TQ6304852140; 51°14′42″N 0°20′05″E | 1363044 | Oxon Hoath More images |
| The Old Palace | Wrotham | House | Pre 1340 | 1 August 1952 | TQ6128359159; 51°18′31″N 0°18′45″E | 1236308 | Upload Photo |
| West House | Wrotham | House | c. 1760 | 1 August 1952 | TQ6103359117; 51°18′30″N 0°18′32″E | 1264616 | Upload Photo |
| Wrotham Place | Wrotham | House | c. 1590 | 1 August 1952 | TQ6116659083; 51°18′29″N 0°18′39″E | 1264591 | Upload Photo |
| Church of St Peter and St Paul | Tonbridge and Malling | Church | C12-C15 | 8 May 1950 | TQ5917446743; 51°11′52″N 0°16′36″E | 1120884 | Church of St Peter and St Paul More images |
| The Port Reeve's House | Tonbridge and Malling | House | Restored after war damage | 8 May 1950 | TQ5923746628; 51°11′48″N 0°16′40″E | 1069966 | The Port Reeve's House More images |
| Ye Olde Chequers Inn | Tonbridge and Malling | Inn | 15th century | 8 May 1950 | TQ5905946583; 51°11′47″N 0°16′30″E | 1069979 | Ye Olde Chequers Inn More images |
| 124 High Street | Tonbridge and Malling | Jettied House | 15th century | 8 May 1950 | TQ5905446596; 51°11′47″N 0°16′30″E | 1363400 | 124 High Street More images |
