= Grade II* listed buildings in Sevenoaks District =

There are over 20,000 Grade II* listed buildings in England. This page is a list of these buildings in the district of Sevenoaks in Kent.

== Sevenoaks ==
| Name | Location | Type | Completed (Note: The date given is the date used by Historic England as significant for the initial building or that of an important part in the structure's description.) | Date designated | Grid ref. (Note: The grid reference is based on the British national grid reference system, sometimes known as OSGB36, used by the Ordnance Survey.) Geo-coordinates | Entry number (Note: The "List Entry Number" is a unique number assigned to each listed building and scheduled monument by Historic England.) | Image |
|---|---|---|---|---|---|---|---|
| Ash Manor | New Ash Green, Ash-cum-Ridley, Sevenoaks | House | Early 17th century | 1 August 1952 | TQ6021464541; 51°21′26″N 0°17′59″E | 1216772 | Ash Manor |
| Church of Saint Peter | Ridley, Ash-cum-Ridley | Church | 13th century | 1 June 1967 | TQ6161463901; 51°21′04″N 0°19′10″E | 1216987 | Church of Saint Peter More images |
| South Ash Manor | Ash-cum-Ridley | House | Later | 1 June 1967 | TQ5959863165; 51°20′43″N 0°17′25″E | 1275615 | Upload Photo |
| Church of St Martin | Brasted | Church | 13th century | 10 September 1954 | TQ4686155490; 51°16′47″N 0°06′15″E | 1346417 | Church of St Martin More images |
| The walled garden at Chevening House including potting range | Chevening House, Chevening | Walled Garden | c. 1775 | 14 July 1988 | TQ4837957803; 51°18′00″N 0°07′37″E | 1244220 | Upload Photo |
| Bee house in walled garden at Chevening House | Chevening House, Chevening | Apiary | c. 1850 | 14 July 1988 | TQ4834057740; 51°17′58″N 0°07′35″E | 1244221 | Upload Photo |
| Chiddingstone Castle | Chiddingstone Castle, Chiddingstone | House | 17th century | 16 January 1975 | TQ4983145126; 51°11′09″N 0°08′33″E | 1252483 | Chiddingstone Castle More images |
| Church of St Luke | Chiddingstone Causeway, Chiddingstone | Church | 1897-98 | 10 September 1954 | TQ5169546664; 51°11′57″N 0°10′11″E | 1252482 | Church of St Luke More images |
| Church of St Mary | Chiddingstone | Church | 1627 | 10 September 1954 | TQ5008645193; 51°11′11″N 0°08′46″E | 1262259 | Church of St Mary More images |
| Prinkham | Prinkham, Chiddingstone | House | Early 17th century | 10 September 1954 | TQ4957941132; 51°09′00″N 0°08′14″E | 1085873 | Prinkham More images |
| Pumphouse Gazebo Orangery and Garden Wall Chiddingstone Castle | Chiddingstone Castle, Chiddingstone | Garden Wall | c. 1797 | 16 January 1975 | TQ4978345062; 51°11′07″N 0°08′30″E | 1085889 | Pumphouse Gazebo Orangery and Garden Wall Chiddingstone Castle More images |
| The Castle Inn | Chiddingstone | Inn | 16th century | 10 September 1954 | TQ5004245153; 51°11′09″N 0°08′44″E | 1252477 | The Castle Inn More images |
| The Post Office and Village Shop | Chiddingstone | Jettied House | 16th century | 10 September 1954 | TQ5008745157; 51°11′09″N 0°08′46″E | 1252475 | The Post Office and Village Shop More images |
| Woodgates | Chiddingstone Hoath, Chiddingstone | House | 16th century | 16 January 1975 | TQ5012042345; 51°09′38″N 0°08′44″E | 1336423 | Upload Photo |
| 1 High Street | Chiddingstone | Jettied House | 16th century | 10 September 1954 | TQ5010945158; 51°11′09″N 0°08′47″E | 1252472 | 1 High Street More images |
| 4 High Street | Chiddingstone | House | 1697 | 10 September 1954 | TQ5007045156; 51°11′09″N 0°08′45″E | 1085885 | 4 High Street More images |
| Bassets Farmhouse | Bassets Farm, Cowden | Farmhouse | Early 16th century | 10 September 1954 | TQ4954641304; 51°09′05″N 0°08′13″E | 1252534 | Bassets Farmhouse More images |
| Crippenden Manor House | Crippenden Manor, Cowden | Manor House | 1607 | 10 September 1954 | TQ4471541736; 51°09′24″N 0°04′05″E | 1253834 | Crippenden Manor House More images |
| Waystrode Manor | Waystrode Manor, Cowden | Farmhouse | 15th century | 10 September 1954 | TQ4599240584; 51°08′45″N 0°05′09″E | 1336397 | Waystrode Manor More images |
| Broughton House | Broughton House, Dunton Green | Villa | c. 1830 | 10 September 1954 | TQ5116458125; 51°18′08″N 0°10′01″E | 1253962 | Upload Photo |
| Fort Halstead: Buildings F16 and F17 | Dunton Green | Bomb Chamber | Built in 1947 | 21 March 2013 | TQ4991459168; 51°18′43″N 0°08′58″E | 1412293 | Upload Photo |
| Church House | Edenbridge | Farmhouse | 1378-1396 | 10 September 1954 | TQ4438046138; 51°11′46″N 0°03′54″E | 1242994 | Upload Photo |
| Old Stanford's End | Stanford's End, Edenbridge | Farmhouse | 15th century | 10 September 1954 | TQ4508444460; 51°10′51″N 0°04′28″E | 1258231 | Upload Photo |
| Tanyard House | Edenbridge, Edenbridge | House | Later-Post 15th century | 10 September 1954 | TQ4439446048; 51°11′43″N 0°03′54″E | 1258054 | Tanyard House More images |
| Taylour House | Edenbridge | House | Later-Post 15th century | 10 September 1954 | TQ4440346112; 51°11′46″N 0°03′55″E | 1085940 | Upload Photo |
| The Crown Hotel | Edenbridge | House | Later-Post 15th century | 10 September 1954 | TQ4438646117; 51°11′46″N 0°03′54″E | 1259794 | The Crown Hotel More images |
| Lullingstone Castle | Lullingstone, Eynsford | House | 1543-1580 | 1 August 1952 | TQ5301264382; 51°21′28″N 0°11′46″E | 1222202 | Lullingstone Castle More images |
| Mausoleum of Thomas Nash in churchyard of Saint Peter and Saint Paul to the south of porch | Farningham | Mausoleum | c. 1778 | 22 October 1982 | TQ5471666879; 51°22′48″N 0°13′18″E | 1237803 | Mausoleum of Thomas Nash in churchyard of Saint Peter and Saint Paul to the south of porch More images |
| Mill House | Farningham | House | c. 1790 | 1 August 1952 | TQ5451066993; 51°22′51″N 0°13′08″E | 1274483 | Mill House More images |
| The Water Mill | Farningham | Watermill | c1790 and before 1799 | 1 August 1952 | TQ5450467008; 51°22′52″N 0°13′08″E | 1238035 | The Water Mill More images |
| The White House | Farningham | House | c. 1743 | 1 June 1967 | TQ5455767104; 51°22′55″N 0°13′10″E | 1274501 | The White House More images |
| The Parish Church of Saint Mary the Virgin | Horton Kirby and South Darenth | Church | c. 1190 | 1 June 1967 | TQ5620968559; 51°23′40″N 0°14′38″E | 1238792 | The Parish Church of Saint Mary the Virgin More images |
| Church of St Mary | Kemsing | Church | Possibly 16th century | 10 September 1954 | TQ5560858784; 51°18′25″N 0°13′52″E | 1258355 | Church of St Mary More images |
| Crowdleham | Crowdleham, Kemsing | House | Early 19th century | 10 September 1954 | TQ5674158880; 51°18′27″N 0°14′50″E | 1258570 | Upload Photo |
| Walnut Tree Cottage | Heaverham, Kemsing | House | Probably 16th century | 10 September 1954 | TQ5708358769; 51°18′23″N 0°15′08″E | 1258569 | Walnut Tree Cottage More images |
| Church of St Katherine | Knockholt | Church | Medieval | 22 October 1971 | TQ4678258929; 51°18′38″N 0°06′16″E | 1273386 | Church of St Katherine More images |
| Church of St Mary | Leigh | Church | 13th century | 10 September 1954 | TQ5487246608; 51°11′52″N 0°12′55″E | 1258950 | Church of St Mary More images |
| Paul's Farmhouse | Paul's Farm, Leigh | Farmhouse | 16th century or earlier | 10 September 1954 | TQ5445246130; 51°11′37″N 0°12′32″E | 1258824 | Upload Photo |
| Ramhurst Manor House | Ramhurst Manor, Leigh | Manor House | 16th century or earlier | 10 September 1954 | TQ5638746705; 51°11′53″N 0°14′13″E | 1258987 | Ramhurst Manor House |
| Broughton Manor | Otford | House | 17th century | 10 September 1954 | TQ5228559270; 51°18′44″N 0°11′01″E | 1259018 | Broughton Manor |
| Castle Cottages and Store Building at East End | Otford | Archbishops Palace | Early 16th century | 10 September 1954 | TQ5283059199; 51°18′41″N 0°11′29″E | 1273146 | Upload Photo |
| Holmesdale House & Holmesdale Villa | Otford | House | Early 18th century | 10 September 1954 | TQ5277059258; 51°18′43″N 0°11′26″E | 1259052 | Upload Photo |
| Pickmoss including Former No 67 (Pickmoss Cottage) | Otford | House | Later-Post c1700 | 10 September 1954 | TQ5241159338; 51°18′46″N 0°11′08″E | 1259016 | Upload Photo |
| The Chantry House | Otford | House | c. 1540 | 16 January 1975 | TQ5282259295; 51°18′44″N 0°11′29″E | 1273144 | The Chantry House More images |
| Wall and Gates to North of Broughton Manor | Otford | Gate | 17th century | 16 January 1975 | TQ5231259305; 51°18′45″N 0°11′02″E | 1259019 | Upload Photo |
| Brick Barn to West and slightly North of Chafford Park | Chafford Park, Penshurst | Barn | Possibly 16th century | 16 January 1975 | TQ5158439510; 51°08′05″N 0°09′55″E | 1243038 | Upload Photo |
| Cartshed adjoining Road to North of South Park Farmhouse | South Park, Penshurst | Cart Shed | 1850-1 | 16 January 1975 | TQ5232242698; 51°09′48″N 0°10′38″E | 1243096 | Upload Photo |
| Chafford Park | Chafford Park, Penshurst | House | Early 18th century | 10 September 1954 | TQ5162639478; 51°08′04″N 0°09′57″E | 1243036 | Chafford Park |
| Garden wall to north, east and south of Penshurst Place Gardens | Penshurst Park, Penshurst, Sevenoaks | Gate | 1739 | 10 September 1954 | TQ5294344034; 51°10′30″N 0°11′12″E | 1243045 | Garden wall to north, east and south of Penshurst Place Gardens More images |
| Inner garden wall to north and west of formal garden of Penshurst Place | Penshurst Park, Penshurst | Wall | Probably Early 17th century | 16 January 1975 | TQ5274443909; 51°10′26″N 0°11′01″E | 1273071 | Upload Photo |
| Old Swaylands incorporating the Former Swale Cottage | Old Swaylands, Penshurst | House | 16th century | 10 September 1954 | TQ5341042594; 51°09′43″N 0°11′33″E | 1273095 | Old Swaylands incorporating the Former Swale Cottage More images |
| Range of Farm Buildings at West End of South Park Farmyard | South Park, Penshurst | Steam Engine House | 17th century | 16 January 1975 | TQ5226942711; 51°09′48″N 0°10′35″E | 1243027 | Upload Photo |
| South Park Farmhouse including attached Barn | South Park, Penshurst | Farmhouse | 16th century | 16 January 1975 | TQ5230642680; 51°09′47″N 0°10′37″E | 1243092 | Upload Photo |
| Springhill | Fordcombe, Penshurst | Farmhouse | 16th century | 10 September 1954 | TQ5227940917; 51°08′50″N 0°10′33″E | 1243121 | Upload Photo |
| Star House including Boutique | Penshurst | House | 19th century | 10 September 1954 | TQ5250143570; 51°10′16″N 0°10′48″E | 1243221 | Star House including Boutique More images |
| The Old Guildhouse | Penshurst | House | Later, Post 16th century | 16 January 1975 | TQ5275143824; 51°10′24″N 0°11′01″E | 1272985 | The Old Guildhouse More images |
| Wall running south south east from southern tip of Penshurst Place and returning eastward | Penshurst Park, Penshurst | Boundary Wall | 17th century | 10 September 1954 | TQ5275643872; 51°10′25″N 0°11′02″E | 1243174 | Wall running south south east from southern tip of Penshurst Place and returning eastward More images |
| Western Cartshed to North of South Park Farmhouse | South Park, Penshurst | Cart Shed | 1850-1 | 16 January 1975 | TQ5231242699; 51°09′48″N 0°10′37″E | 1272451 | Upload Photo |
| Black Charles | Underriver, Seal | House | Later 16th century | 10 September 1954 | TQ5552252410; 51°14′59″N 0°13′37″E | 1243688 | Black Charles More images |
| Catts Cottage | Underriver, Seal | Farmhouse | Late Medieval | 10 September 1954 | TQ5569452114; 51°14′49″N 0°13′46″E | 1272772 | Upload Photo |
| Stonepitts Manor House | Stonepitts, Seal, Sevenoaks | House | Possibly 14th century or Early 15th century | 10 September 1954 | TQ5686557051; 51°17′28″N 0°14′54″E | 1243513 | Upload Photo |
| Almshouses | Sevenoaks | Gate | 18th century | 13 April 1951 | TQ5314654151; 51°15′57″N 0°11′38″E | 1086007 | Almshouses More images |
| Archway connecting to the Almshouses | Sevenoaks | Gate | Dated 1890 | 13 April 1951 | TQ5316454201; 51°15′59″N 0°11′39″E | 1204196 | Upload Photo |
| Bradbourne Farmhouse | Bradbourne Farm, Sevenoaks | Farmhouse | c. 1700 | 13 April 1951 | TQ5223656377; 51°17′10″N 0°10′54″E | 1086043 | Upload Photo |
| Chantry House including Entrance Gateway and Screen Wall to Courtyard | Sevenoaks | House | 17th century | 13 April 1951 | TQ5313054267; 51°16′01″N 0°11′37″E | 1086021 | Chantry House including Entrance Gateway and Screen Wall to Courtyard More images |
| Church of Saint Nicholas | Sevenoaks | Parish Church | 13th century | 13 April 1951 | TQ5311754311; 51°16′03″N 0°11′36″E | 1204351 | Church of Saint Nicholas More images |
| Sevenoaks School | Sevenoaks | School | Early 18th century | 13 April 1951 | TQ5316854189; 51°15′59″N 0°11′39″E | 1336360 | Sevenoaks School More images |
| Side Screen Walls connecting the Almshouses | Sevenoaks | Wall | Early 18th century | 13 April 1951 | TQ5315854204; 51°15′59″N 0°11′38″E | 1204209 | Upload Photo |
| The Old House | Sevenoaks | House | c. 1700 | 13 April 1951 | TQ5315954372; 51°16′05″N 0°11′39″E | 1204256 | The Old House More images |
| The Red House including Entrance Gateway, Railings and Side Brick Walls to Forecourt | Sevenoaks | House | c. 1700 | 13 April 1951 | TQ5312854518; 51°16′09″N 0°11′37″E | 1204275 | The Red House including Entrance Gateway, Railings and Side Brick Walls to Forecourt More images |
| 13 High Street | Sevenoaks | House | 16th century | 13 April 1951 | TQ5312254215; 51°15′59″N 0°11′36″E | 1086019 | 13 High Street More images |
| 15 High Street | Sevenoaks | House | 16th century | 13 April 1951 | TQ5312054224; 51°16′00″N 0°11′36″E | 1204347 | 15 High Street More images |
| 17 High Street | Sevenoaks | House | 16th century | 13 April 1951 | TQ5312654231; 51°16′00″N 0°11′37″E | 1086020 | 17 High Street More images |
| Long Barn | Sevenoaks Weald | House | 16th century | 10 September 1954 | TQ5264150571; 51°14′02″N 0°11′06″E | 1272861 | Upload Photo |
| Wickhurst Manor | Wickhurst Manor, Sevenoaks Weald | House | 19th century | 10 September 1954 | TQ5173751249; 51°14′25″N 0°10′20″E | 1272858 | Wickhurst Manor More images |
| Filston Hall Farmhouse | Filstone Hall Farm, Shoreham | Farmhouse | Late Medieval | 10 September 1954 | TQ5160560778; 51°19′33″N 0°10′28″E | 1243841 | Filston Hall Farmhouse More images |
| Church of St Mary at South End of Village Green | Ide Hill, Sundridge with Ide Hill | Church | 1865-6 | 10 September 1954 | TQ4861651698; 51°14′42″N 0°07′40″E | 1272747 | Church of St Mary at South End of Village Green More images |
| The Old Hall | Sundridge, Sundridge with Ide Hill | House | 15th century | 10 September 1954 | TQ4802555326; 51°16′40″N 0°07′15″E | 1243928 | Upload Photo |
| The Old Rectory | Sundridge, Sundridge with Ide Hill | House | 18th century | 10 September 1954 | TQ4852255231; 51°16′37″N 0°07′41″E | 1243893 | The Old Rectory |
| Yorkshill Farmhouse | Yorkshill, Sundridge with Ide Hill | Farmhouse | 15th century or earlier | 16 January 1975 | TQ4986651353; 51°14′30″N 0°08′44″E | 1243929 | Upload Photo |
| Church of St Mary the Virgin | Westerham | Church | 13th century | 10 September 1954 | TQ4475954083; 51°16′03″N 0°04′25″E | 1244024 | Church of St Mary the Virgin More images |
| Court Lodge | Westerham | House | 17th century | 10 September 1954 | TQ4464054637; 51°16′21″N 0°04′20″E | 1272576 | Court Lodge |
| Crockham House | Crockham House, Westerham | House | 17th century | 10 September 1954 | TQ4461752030; 51°14′57″N 0°04′15″E | 1272646 | Upload Photo |
| Darenth Cottage | Westerham | House | 15th century | 10 September 1954 | TQ4487154046; 51°16′02″N 0°04′31″E | 1244137 | Upload Photo |
| Farley & Wolfelands | Westerham | Apartments | Late 17th century | 10 September 1954 | TQ4403753683; 51°15′51″N 0°03′47″E | 1272571 | Upload Photo |
| Grosvenor House | Westerham | House | Early 18th century | 10 September 1954 | TQ4488254014; 51°16′01″N 0°04′31″E | 1244143 | Upload Photo |
| Rysted House | Westerham | House | 1675 | 10 September 1954 | TQ4444353970; 51°16′00″N 0°04′08″E | 1244079 | Upload Photo |
| Squerryes Lodge | Westerham | House | Late 17th century | 10 September 1954 | TQ4459853890; 51°15′57″N 0°04′16″E | 1244038 | Upload Photo |
| Statue of General Wolfe | Westerham | Statue | 1911 | 10 September 1954 | TQ4466854028; 51°16′01″N 0°04′20″E | 1244025 | Statue of General Wolfe More images |
| The Vicarage and Vicarage Flat above | Westerham | Apartment | Later-Post 15th century | 10 September 1954 | TQ4477553979; 51°16′00″N 0°04′26″E | 1244140 | Upload Photo |
| 49 and 51 High Street | Westerham | House | 1600 | 10 September 1954 | TQ4441053884; 51°15′57″N 0°04′07″E | 1272573 | Upload Photo |
