= Grade II* listed buildings in Medway =

There are over 20,000 Grade II* listed buildings in England. This page is a list of these buildings in the district of Medway in Kent.

== Medway ==
Name	Location	Type	Completed (Note: The date given is the date used by Historic England as significant for the initial building or that of an important part in the structure's description.)	Date designated	Grid ref. (Note: The grid reference is based on the British national grid reference system, sometimes known as OSGB36, used by the Ordnance Survey.) Geo-coordinates	Entry number (Note: The "List Entry Number" is a unique number assigned to each listed building and scheduled monument by Historic England.)	Image
Slough Fort	Allhallows, Medway	Fort	1867	12 November 2009	TQ8377178519; 51°28′33″N 0°38′41″E	1393526	Slough Fort More images
The Rectory House	Cliffe and Cliffe Woods	House	1679	21 November 1966	TQ7333874867; 51°26′47″N 0°29′35″E	1204092	Upload Photo
High Birch	Upper Bush, Cuxton	House	Later	27 August 1952	TQ6953066795; 51°22′30″N 0°26′04″E	1281324	High Birch More images
Building LU001 (former B Magazine), Upnor Depot	Upnor, Frindsbury Extra	Magazine	1856 to 1857	17 April 2009	TQ7589470774; 51°24′31″N 0°31′40″E	1393292	Upload Photo
94–96 High Street	Halling	House	19th century	14 November 1986	TQ7043164039; 51°21′00″N 0°26′46″E	1336494	Upload Photo
Church of St Mary	St Mary Hoo	House	1966	21 November 1966	TQ8037176593; 51°27′34″N 0°35′42″E	1085756	Church of St Mary More images
Berkeley House	Eastgate	House	Early 19th century	24 October 1950	TQ7454468195; 51°23′09″N 0°30′25″E	1086501	Berkeley House More images
Bishop's Court with Bishop's Court Flat and Rear Flat Attached	Medway	Bishops Palace	1845	24 October 1950	TQ7412368338; 51°23′15″N 0°30′04″E	1086434	Bishop's Court with Bishop's Court Flat and Rear Flat Attached More images
Bloors Place	Rainham	House	Early 16th century	24 February 1950	TQ8148067478; 51°22′38″N 0°36′22″E	1267763	Upload Photo
Boer War Memorial Arch, Brompton Barracks	Brompton	Triumphal Arch	1902	8 July 1998	TQ7642869040; 51°23′35″N 0°32′04″E	1375606	Boer War Memorial Arch, Brompton Barracks More images
Boilershop	Chatham Historic Dockyard	Boiler Shop	1984	6 June 1984	TQ7640369941; 51°24′04″N 0°32′05″E	1267821	Upload Photo
Brompton Barracks, Gymnasium	Brompton	Barracks	1863	8 July 1998	TQ7638968895; 51°23′30″N 0°32′02″E	1375603	Brompton Barracks, Gymnasium More images
Chatham Dock Pumping Station South	Chatham Historic Dockyard	Boiler House	1816-1823	13 August 1999	TQ7595069294; 51°23′43″N 0°31′40″E	1378623	Chatham Dock Pumping Station South More images
Chatham Memorial Synagogue	Rochester	Tower	1865	2 December 1985	TQ7511367905; 51°22′59″N 0°30′54″E	1086467	Chatham Memorial Synagogue More images
Church of St John the Divine	Chatham	Church	1820-1821	29 October 1952	TQ7563267820; 51°22′56″N 0°31′21″E	1268218	Church of St John the Divine More images
Church of St Mary Magdalen	Gillingham Green	Church	Early 13th century	24 February 1950	TQ7837468816; 51°23′25″N 0°33′44″E	1267814	Church of St Mary Magdalen More images
Clock Tower Building	Chatham Historic Dockyard	Mould Loft	1723	24 May 1971	TQ7593869214; 51°23′41″N 0°31′39″E	1268241	Clock Tower Building More images
Cloudesley House, with Walls Attached at Rear	Medway	House	1950	24 October 1950	TQ7425568659; 51°23′25″N 0°30′11″E	1299563	Cloudesley House, with Walls Attached at Rear
College Green and Southgate and Garden Wall to Front	Rochester	Bishops Palace	1459	24 October 1950	TQ7420168496; 51°23′20″N 0°30′08″E	1086427	College Green and Southgate and Garden Wall to Front
Crimean War Memorial Arch and Gates, Brompton Barracks	Brompton	Gate	1856	8 July 1998	TQ7637169063; 51°23′35″N 0°32′01″E	1375607	Crimean War Memorial Arch and Gates, Brompton Barracks More images
Foord Almshouses	Rochester	Statue	1932	24 October 1950	TQ7372067220; 51°22′39″N 0°29′41″E	1329712	Foord Almshouses
Foord Almshouses Nos 1-47 with Gate and Forecourt Walls Attached	Medway	Gate	1926	24 October 1950	TQ7371567162; 51°22′37″N 0°29′41″E	1329912	Foord Almshouses Nos 1-47 with Gate and Forecourt Walls Attached
Former Admirals Offices and Forecourt Walls and attached Iron Railings	Chatham Historic Dockyard	Wall	1809	24 May 1971	TQ7590769144; 51°23′39″N 0°31′37″E	1268199	Former Admirals Offices and Forecourt Walls and attached Iron Railings More images
Former Assistant Queen's Harbourmaster's Office	Chatham Historic Dockyard	Dockmasters Office	c. 1770	13 August 1999	TQ7578769107; 51°23′38″N 0°31′31″E	1378596	Upload Photo
Former Captain of the Dockyards House and Attached Front Area Railings	Chatham Historic Dockyard	Naval Officers House	Early 19th century	24 May 1971	TQ7595569085; 51°23′37″N 0°31′40″E	1268221	Upload Photo
Former Cashiers Office	Chatham Historic Dockyard	Pay Office	Late 18th century	24 May 1971	TQ7594369074; 51°23′36″N 0°31′39″E	1268222	Upload Photo
Former Guard House	Chatham Historic Dockyard	Guardhouse	Early 19th century	13 August 1999	TQ7570368666; 51°23′23″N 0°31′26″E	1378598	Former Guard House More images
Former Hatchelling House and Engine Room	Chatham Historic Dockyard	Hatchelling House	1787-1791	24 May 1971	TQ7582569009; 51°23′34″N 0°31′33″E	1268248	Former Hatchelling House and Engine Room More images
Former Hemp House, Spinning Room and Offices	Chatham Historic Dockyard	Ropery	Mid 19th century	13 August 1999	TQ7583968955; 51°23′33″N 0°31′34″E	1378608	Upload Photo
Former Police Offices and attached Wall	Chatham Historic Dockyard	Wall	1764	24 May 1971	TQ7590368926; 51°23′32″N 0°31′37″E	1268200	Upload Photo
Former Tarred Yarn House	Chatham Historic Dockyard	Capstan House	1786-1791	13 August 1999	TQ7581668868; 51°23′30″N 0°31′32″E	1378610	Former Tarred Yarn House More images
Former Wheelwrights' Shop	Chatham Historic Dockyard	Mast House	Late C18/Early 19th century	13 August 1999	TQ7606469400; 51°23′47″N 0°31′46″E	1378637	Former Wheelwrights' Shop
Front and Perimeter Walls to Raised Gardens to Rear of Former Officers Terrace	Chatham Historic Dockyard	Boundary Wall	c. 1731	13 August 1999	TQ7604269120; 51°23′38″N 0°31′44″E	1378599	Upload Photo
George Vaults	Rochester	Public House	Late 18th century	24 October 1950	TQ7426768684; 51°23′26″N 0°30′12″E	1186209	George Vaults More images
Gordon Hotel	Medway	Town House	Late 17th century	24 October 1950	TQ7436368524; 51°23′20″N 0°30′17″E	1336123	Gordon Hotel More images
Guard House West and Store	Chatham Historic Dockyard	Guardhouse	Mid 19th century	13 August 1999	TQ7587768902; 51°23′31″N 0°31′36″E	1378624	Guard House West and Store More images
Joiners Shop	Chatham Historic Dockyard	Joiners Shop	Mid/Late 19th century	13 August 1999	TQ7598869259; 51°23′42″N 0°31′42″E	1378612	Joiners Shop More images
Lower Boat Store	Chatham Historic Dockyard	Boat House	1844	13 August 1999	TQ7624169635; 51°23′54″N 0°31′56″E	1378639	Upload Photo
Memorial to General Gordon, Brompton Barracks	Brompton	Statue	1890	8 July 1998	TQ7644969031; 51°23′34″N 0°32′05″E	1375610	Upload Photo
Milton Cottage	Boley Hill	House	Post 1632	19 February 1970	TQ7411768478; 51°23′19″N 0°30′04″E	1086509	Milton Cottage
No 60 (including Those Parts at Rear Facing College Green) Rear Part of 60 High Street	Medway	House	1950	24 October 1950	TQ7429468596; 51°23′23″N 0°30′13″E	1299552	No 60 (including Those Parts at Rear Facing College Green) Rear Part of 60 High Street More images
No 82 with No 82a to Rear No 82 with Philip Lodge to Rear	Medway	House	1950	24 October 1950	TQ7434768503; 51°23′20″N 0°30′16″E	1336131	No 82 with No 82a to Rear No 82 with Philip Lodge to Rear More images
North Block and attached Basement Area Railings, Brompton Barracks	Brompton	Barracks	Later alterations	8 July 1998	TQ7631769143; 51°23′38″N 0°31′59″E	1375611	Upload Photo
North Tower House and attached Perimeter Wall to the South	Chatham Historic Dockyard	House	c. 1718	13 August 1999	TQ7608469194; 51°23′40″N 0°31′47″E	1378603	Upload Photo
Nos 1-47, Cupola in Centre Court, Foord Almshouses Nos 48-64, 1-47	Medway	Doric Temple	1927	24 October 1950	TQ7371267122; 51°22′36″N 0°29′40″E	1086430	Upload Photo
Number 1 Smithery	Chatham Historic Dockyard	Boiler House	1841-1842	13 August 1999	TQ7602669320; 51°23′44″N 0°31′44″E	1378614	Upload Photo
Number 1 Workbase	Chatham Historic Dockyard	Workshop	1861	13 August 1999	TQ7585569215; 51°23′41″N 0°31′35″E	1378631	Upload Photo
Number 2 Dry Dock	Chatham Historic Dockyard	Dry Dock	1858-1860	13 August 1999	TQ7586369245; 51°23′42″N 0°31′35″E	1378633	Number 2 Dry Dock
Number 3 Dry Dock	Chatham Historic Dockyard	Dry Dock	1816-1821	13 August 1999	TQ7586969304; 51°23′44″N 0°31′36″E	1378634	Number 3 Dry Dock
Number 8 Machine Shop	Chatham Historic Dockyard	Slip Shed	c. 1845	6 June 1984	TQ7653170022; 51°24′06″N 0°32′11″E	1267822	Number 8 Machine Shop
Officers' Block and Attached Front Basement Railings, Brompton Barracks	Brompton	Barracks	Later alterations	8 July 1998	TQ7621869125; 51°23′38″N 0°31′54″E	1375612	Upload Photo
Old Hall and Old Vicarage	Boley Hill, Medway	House	Early 18th century	24 October 1950	TQ7411168491; 51°23′20″N 0°30′03″E	1086510	Upload Photo
Old St Margaret's/The King's School	King's School, Rochester	School	19th century	24 October 1950	TQ7410968300; 51°23′13″N 0°30′03″E	1086435	Old St Margaret's/The King's School More images
Parish Church of All Saints	Frindsbury	Parish Church	Norman	24 October 1950	TQ7441269801; 51°24′02″N 0°30′21″E	1107886	Parish Church of All Saints More images
Parish Church of St Margaret of Antioch	Rochester	Parish Church	1458-65	24 October 1950	TQ7402268064; 51°23′06″N 0°29′58″E	1086400	Parish Church of St Margaret of Antioch More images
Parish Church of St Mary	Strood	Parish Church	1868-9	16 May 1991	TQ7387469521; 51°23′53″N 0°29′53″E	1121550	Parish Church of St Mary More images
Royal Victoria and Bull Hotel	Rochester	Courtyard	Late 18th century	24 October 1950	TQ7420968731; 51°23′27″N 0°30′09″E	1086485	Royal Victoria and Bull Hotel More images
South Block and attached Front Basement Area Railings, Brompton Barracks	Brompton	Barracks	Later alterations	8 July 1998	TQ7627569052; 51°23′35″N 0°31′56″E	1375615	Upload Photo
South Tower House	Chatham Historic Dockyard	House	c. 1718	13 August 1999	TQ7599869044; 51°23′35″N 0°31′42″E	1378601	Upload Photo
St Bartholomew's Chapel	Rochester	Chapel of Ease	1952	29 October 1952	TQ7524967892; 51°22′59″N 0°31′01″E	1268238	St Bartholomew's Chapel More images
Stable, South Range and attached Wall to South	Chatham Historic Dockyard	Wall	Early 18th century	13 August 1999	TQ7594268972; 51°23′33″N 0°31′39″E	1378606	Upload Photo
Stables, North Range and attached Perimeter Wall	Chatham Historic Dockyard	Boundary Wall	c. 1737	13 August 1999	TQ7596068986; 51°23′33″N 0°31′40″E	1378605	Upload Photo
Star Hill House with Railings to Front	Medway	House	Late 18th century	24 October 1950	TQ7459168061; 51°23′05″N 0°30′28″E	1086408	Upload Photo
The Bell Mast	Chatham Historic Dockyard	Bell Mast	Late C18/Early 19th century	13 August 1999	TQ7586168896; 51°23′31″N 0°31′35″E	1378626	The Bell Mast More images
The Customs House	Chatham Historic Dockyard	Guardhouse	Early 19th century	13 August 1999	TQ7586969021; 51°23′35″N 0°31′35″E	1378635	The Customs House More images
The Gleanings with Railings to Rear West	Rochester	House	c. 1830	19 February 1970	TQ7402968134; 51°23′08″N 0°29′59″E	1326284	The Gleanings with Railings to Rear West More images
The Guard House (cafe)	Chatham Historic Dockyard	Cafe	1999	13 August 1999	TQ7585069018; 51°23′35″N 0°31′34″E	1378621	The Guard House (cafe) More images
The Limes and attached Garden Wall to North	Rochester	House	Mid 19th century	24 October 1950	TQ7406768182; 51°23′10″N 0°30′01″E	1086439	Upload Photo
The Royal Dockyard Church	Chatham Historic Dockyard	Seamen's Church	1808-1811	24 May 1971	TQ7589768975; 51°23′33″N 0°31′37″E	1268203	The Royal Dockyard Church More images
The Vines	Rochester	Timber Framed House	Early 18th century	24 October 1950	TQ7435368202; 51°23′10″N 0°30′15″E	1185370	Upload Photo
Timber Seasoning Store, North	Chatham Historic Dockyard	Timber Seasoning Shed	1771	13 August 1999	TQ7611669363; 51°23′45″N 0°31′49″E	1378617	Upload Photo
Timber Seasoning Store, South	Chatham Historic Dockyard	Timber Seasoning Shed	1771	13 August 1999	TQ7608069313; 51°23′44″N 0°31′47″E	1378619	Upload Photo
Wall Surrounding Garden to Rear of former Commissioner's House	Chatham Historic Dockyard	Gate Pier	Mid/Late 19th century	13 August 1999	TQ7592669026; 51°23′35″N 0°31′38″E	1378636	Upload Photo
156 Eastgate & High Street	Eastgate, Rochester	Timber Framed House	17th century	24 October 1950	TQ7448668288; 51°23′13″N 0°30′23″E	1299474	156 Eastgate & High Street More images
12 and 14 High Street	Rochester	House	first 1/4 of 16th century	24 October 1950	TQ7419768748; 51°23′28″N 0°30′08″E	1336127	12 and 14 High Street
168 Eastgate & High Street	Eastgate, Rochester	House	Mid 17th century	24 October 1950	TQ7450668259; 51°23′12″N 0°30′23″E	1336136	168 Eastgate & High Street More images
83 High Street	Rochester	House	Late 17th century	24 October 1950	TQ7434668548; 51°23′21″N 0°30′16″E	1116481	83 High Street More images
351 High Street	Rochester	House	Early 19th century	2 December 1991	TQ7514367929; 51°23′00″N 0°30′56″E	1320136	351 High Street More images
