= Grade II* listed buildings in Thanet =

There are over 20,000 Grade II* listed buildings in England. This page is a list of these buildings in the district of Thanet in Kent.

== Thanet ==
Name	Location	Type	Completed (Note: The date given is the date used by Historic England as significant for the initial building or that of an important part in the structure's description.)	Date designated	Grid ref. (Note: The grid reference is based on the British national grid reference system, sometimes known as OSGB36, used by the Ordnance Survey.) Geo-coordinates	Entry number (Note: The "List Entry Number" is a unique number assigned to each listed building and scheduled monument by Historic England.)	Image
124 High Street	Ramsgate	House	Early 18th century	4 February 1988	TR3799165205; 51°20′10″N 1°24′55″E	1336660	124 High Street
Church of All Saints	Birchington-on-Sea, Birchington, Thanet	Church	12th century	10 April 1951	TR3019169034; 51°22′25″N 1°18′22″E	1094681	Church of All Saints More images
Barn about 50 Metres East of Ozengell Grange	Ramsgate	Tithe Barn	Late 14th century	4 February 1988	TR3572365638; 51°20′27″N 1°22′59″E	1336669	Upload Photo
Cemetery Chapels	Ramsgate	Anglican Church	1872	4 February 1988	TR3836866033; 51°20′36″N 1°25′17″E	1348349	Cemetery Chapels More images
Chilton Farmhouse	Ramsgate	Farmhouse	16th century foundations	4 February 1988	TR3633864593; 51°19′53″N 1°23′29″E	1085400	Upload Photo
Cleve Court and Cleve Lodge	Monkton	House	17th century or earlier	11 October 1963	TR3115666315; 51°20′56″N 1°19′05″E	1224683	Cleve Court and Cleve Lodge
The Clock House	Royal Harbour, Ramsgate	House	1817	4 February 1988	TR3850764715; 51°19′53″N 1°25′21″E	1336325	The Clock House More images
Conservatory and Wall to which it is attached	King George Vi Memorial Park, Ramsgate	Boundary Wall	Early 19th century	15 February 1973	TR3923766037; 51°20′35″N 1°26′02″E	1085336	Conservatory and Wall to which it is attached More images
Dent De Lion Gateway	Garlinge	Gateway	15th century	10 April 1951	TR3321669627; 51°22′40″N 1°20′59″E	1341531	Dent De Lion Gateway
Dreamland Cinema	Margate	Cinema	1935	11 August 1992	TR3501170630; 51°23′10″N 1°22′34″E	1260315	Dreamland Cinema More images
Gore Street Farmhouse	Monkton	Farmhouse	16th century	13 October 1952	TR2730965117; 51°20′23″N 1°15′44″E	1224340	Upload Photo
Harbour Cross Wall, Sluices, Bollards, Dry Dock, Basin Gates, Wing Wall and Dundee Steps	Royal Harbour, Ramsgate	Gate	1821	30 October 1985	TR3833264605; 51°19′50″N 1°25′11″E	1336324	Harbour Cross Wall, Sluices, Bollards, Dry Dock, Basin Gates, Wing Wall and Dundee Steps
India House	12 Hawley Street, Margate	Villa	Built c1766-7	10 April 1951	TR3543270926; 51°23′19″N 1°22′57″E	1351101	India House More images
John Sanger Memorial	Margate	Grave	1889 or later	16 January 2003	TR3518869214; 51°22′24″N 1°22′40″E	1350382	John Sanger Memorial
Mausoleum of Sir Moses and Lady Judith Montefiore	Montefiore Synagogue, Honeysuckle Road, Ramsgate	Mausoleum	1862	13 August 1968	TR3884165747; 51°20′26″N 1°25′40″E	1085375	Mausoleum of Sir Moses and Lady Judith Montefiore More images
Nether Hale Farmhouse	Nether Hale, St Nicholas at Wade	House	c. 1694	13 October 1982	TR2793267790; 51°21′48″N 1°16′22″E	1266639	Upload Photo
The Old House and Walled Forecourt	Ramsgate	House	Early 18th century	4 February 1988	TR3800465224; 51°20′11″N 1°24′56″E	1085392	Upload Photo
Salmestone Grange including Chapel	Margate	House	17th century	10 April 1951	TR3529469567; 51°22′35″N 1°22′47″E	1281452	Salmestone Grange including Chapel More images
Saint Nicholas Court	St Nicholas at Wade	House	Early 18th century	13 October 1952	TR2595866890; 51°21′22″N 1°14′38″E	1224799	Upload Photo
Parish Church of St Peter the Apostle	St Peter's, Broadstairs and St Peter's	Parish Church	Norman	20 September 1974	TR3808368451; 51°21′55″N 1°25′08″E	1273791	Parish Church of St Peter the Apostle More images
Scenic Railway at Dreamland	Margate	Fairground Ride	1919-1920	1 March 2002	TR3510870540; 51°23′07″N 1°22′39″E	1359602	Scenic Railway at Dreamland More images
Stone House	Broadstairs, Thanet	House	19th century	24 January 1950	TR3968269013	1267646	Upload Photo
The Surf Boat Memorial, Margate Cemetery	Margate	Sculpture	1900	11 July 2005	TR3507069169; 51°22′22″N 1°22′34″E	1391529	Upload Photo
Synagogue and adjacent Outbuilding	Ramsgate	Synagogue	1831-1833	13 August 1968	TR3883865734; 51°20′26″N 1°25′40″E	1051632	Synagogue and adjacent Outbuilding More images
Theatre Royal	Margate	Theatre	1787	25 August 1955	TR3558770766; 51°23′13″N 1°23′05″E	1341519	Theatre Royal More images
Townley House Mansion	Ramsgate	House	1792	13 September 1974	TR3799165337; 51°20′14″N 1°24′56″E	1336642	Townley House Mansion More images
Tudor House	Margate	House	Mid 16th century, with extensive restoration 1951	10 April 1951	TR3554871055; 51°23′23″N 1°23′03″E	1351107	Tudor House More images
Wayborough Manor	Minster	Jettied House	c. 1460	11 October 1963	TR3195465055; 51°20′14″N 1°19′43″E	1224593	Upload Photo
