= Listed buildings in Dover district, Kent =

Historic structures in Kent, England

There are about 1,900 Listed Buildings in the Dover District, Kent , which are buildings of architectural or historic interest.

- Grade I buildings are of exceptional interest.
- Grade II* buildings are particularly important buildings of more than special interest.
- Grade II buildings are of special interest.

The lists follow Historic England’s geographical organisation, with entries grouped by county, local authority, and parish (civil and non-civil). The following lists are arranged by parish.

Parish	Listed buildings list	Grade I	Grade II*	Grade II	Total
Alkham	Listed buildings in Alkham				
Ash	Listed buildings in Ash, Dover				
Aylesham	Listed buildings in Aylesham				
Capel-le-Ferne	Listed buildings in Capel-le-Ferne				
Deal	Listed buildings in Deal, Kent	4		332	336
Denton with Wootton	Listed buildings in Denton with Wootton				
Dover	Listed buildings in Dover	4	11	118	133
Eastry	Listed buildings in Eastry				
Eythorne	Listed buildings in Eythorne				
Goodnestone	Listed buildings in Goodnestone, Dover				
Great Mongeham	Listed buildings in Great Mongeham				
Guston	Listed buildings in Guston, Kent				
Hougham Without	Listed buildings in Hougham Without				
Langdon	Listed buildings in Langdon, Kent				
Lydden	Listed buildings in Lydden				
Nonington	Listed buildings in Nonington				
Northbourne	Listed buildings in Northbourne, Kent				
Preston-next-Wingham	Listed buildings in Preston-next-Wingham				
Ringwould with Kingsdown	Listed buildings in Ringwould with Kingsdown				
Ripple	Listed buildings in Ripple, Kent				
River	Listed buildings in River				
Sandwich	Listed buildings in Sandwich, Kent	7	26	409	442
Shepherdswell with Coldred	Listed buildings in Shepherdswell with Coldred				
Sholden	Listed buildings in Sholden				
St Margaret's at Cliffe	Listed buildings in St. Margaret's at Cliffe				
Staple	Listed buildings in Staple, Kent				
Stourmouth	Listed buildings in Stourmouth				
Sutton	Listed buildings in Sutton, Kent				
Temple Ewell	Listed buildings in Temple Ewell				
Tilmanstone	Listed buildings in Tilmanstone				
Walmer	Listed buildings in Walmer				
Whitfield	Listed buildings in Whitfield, Kent				
Wingham	Listed buildings in Wingham, Kent				
Woodnesborough	Listed buildings in Woodnesborough				
Worth	Listed buildings in Worth, Kent				
