= Listed buildings in Worth, Kent =

Civil Parish in Kent, England

Worth is a village and civil parish in the Dover District of Kent, England. It contains 30 listed buildings that are recorded in the National Heritage List for England. Of these one is grade II* and 29 are grade II.

This list is based on the information retrieved online from Historic England.

== Key ==
Grade	Criteria
I	Buildings that are of exceptional interest
II*	Particularly important buildings of more than special interest
II	Buildings that are of special interest

== Listing ==
Name	Grade	Location	Type	Completed (Note: The date given is the date used by Historic England as significant for the initial building or that of an important part in the structure's description.)	Date designated	Grid ref. (Note: The grid reference is based on the British national grid reference system, sometimes known as OSGB36, used by the Ordnance Survey.) Geo-coordinates	Notes	Entry number (Note: The "List Entry Number" is a unique number assigned to each listed building and scheduled monument by Historic England.)	Image	Wikidata
Sandilands and the Backs	II	Cambridge Avenue			24 March 1987	TR3655157025; 51°15′48″N 1°23′21″E		1263942	Upload Photo	Q26554688
Fenelon	II	Deal Road			24 March 1987	TR3235856002; 51°15′21″N 1°19′43″E		1247830	Upload Photo	Q26540101
Lime Cottage and Attached Garden Walls	II	Deal Road			24 March 1987	TR3294456164; 51°15′25″N 1°20′14″E		1263906	Upload Photo	Q26554657
Milestone at Tr 335 554	II	Deal Road			24 March 1987	TR3351455431; 51°15′01″N 1°20′41″E		1247829	Upload Photo	Q26540100
Upton House	II	Deal Road, Upton House			11 October 1963	TR3323655811; 51°15′13″N 1°20′28″E		1247728	Upload Photo	Q26540010
Upton Lodge	II	Deal Road, Upton House			24 March 1987	TR3326955701; 51°15′10″N 1°20′29″E		1263944	Upload Photo	Q26554690
Barn and Stable About 30 Metres West of the Shrubbery	II	Felderland Lane			24 March 1987	TR3216155893; 51°15′18″N 1°19′33″E		1247833	Upload Photo	Q26540104
Clockhouse Bungalow Shamrock Cottage	II	Felderland Lane			4 October 1982	TR3286656139; 51°15′25″N 1°20′10″E		1247847	Upload Photo	Q26540115
Felderland Farmhouse and Attached Walls	II	Felderland Lane			13 October 1952	TR3250856062; 51°15′23″N 1°19′51″E		1247831	Upload Photo	Q26540102
Outbuildings About 15 Metres East of Felderland Farmhouse	II	Felderland Lane			24 March 1978	TR3253256058; 51°15′22″N 1°19′52″E		1263907	Upload Photo	Q26554658
The Shrubbery and Wall Attached	II	Felderland Lane			24 March 1987	TR3219055906; 51°15′18″N 1°19′34″E		1263908	Upload Photo	Q26554659
Walled Garden About 10 Metres West of Felderlamd Farmhouse	II	Felderland Lane			24 March 1978	TR3247356053; 51°15′22″N 1°19′49″E		1247832	Upload Photo	Q26540103
Church Farmhouse and Wall Attached	II	Jubilee Road			11 October 1963	TR3370656073; 51°15′21″N 1°20′53″E		1247848	Upload Photo	Q26540116
Kentlands and the Lodge	II	Kings Avenue, Sandwich Bay			1 October 1985	TR3631657689; 51°16′10″N 1°23′11″E		1263915	Upload Photo	Q26554665
Wickhurst	II	Kings Avenue, Sandwich Bay			24 March 1987	TR3596357526; 51°16′05″N 1°22′52″E		1263914	Upload Photo	Q26554664
Restharrow	II	Princes Avenue, Sandwich Bay			24 March 1987	TR3647557269; 51°15′56″N 1°23′18″E		1247851	Upload Photo	Q26540118
Barn About 50 Metres North of Barton Farmhouse	II	The Street			24 March 1987	TR3367656183; 51°15′25″N 1°20′51″E		1263917	Upload Photo	Q26554667
Barton Farmhouse	II	The Street			11 October 1963	TR3368456160; 51°15′24″N 1°20′52″E		1247853	Upload Photo	Q26540120
Carter House	II	The Street			24 March 1987	TR3367056144; 51°15′24″N 1°20′51″E		1247852	Upload Photo	Q26540119
Church of St Peter and St Paul	II*	The Street	church building		11 October 1963	TR3368456111; 51°15′22″N 1°20′52″E		1263919	Church of St Peter and St Paul More images	Q17557815
Corner Cottage	II	The Street			15 April 1980	TR3382356222; 51°15′26″N 1°20′59″E		1247855	Upload Photo	Q26540122
Crispin Inn	II	The Street			24 March 1987	TR3377556214; 51°15′26″N 1°20′57″E		1263918	Upload Photo	Q26554668
Lychgate About 25 Metres West of Church of St Peter and St Paul	II	The Street			24 March 1987	TR3364856117; 51°15′23″N 1°20′50″E		1247858	Upload Photo	Q26540125
The Blue Pigeons	II	The Street, The Blue Pigeons			24 March 1987	TR3363256134; 51°15′23″N 1°20′49″E		1263916	Upload Photo	Q26554666
The Old Blue Pigeons	II	The Street			28 March 1996	TR3366156135; 51°15′23″N 1°20′51″E		1268278	Upload Photo	Q26558601
Tomb Chest to Smithey T Spain About 30 Metres South West of Church of Ss Peter and Paul	II	The Street			24 March 1987	TR3366856089; 51°15′22″N 1°20′51″E		1247857	Upload Photo	Q26540124
Worth Farmhouse	II	The Street			11 October 1963	TR3376156191; 51°15′25″N 1°20′56″E		1247854	Upload Photo	Q26540121
Worth War Memorial	II	The Street	war memorial		9 October 2009	TR3370956140; 51°15′23″N 1°20′53″E		1393477	Worth War Memorial More images	Q26672635
Yew Tree Cottage	II	The Street			24 March 1987	TR3382356166; 51°15′24″N 1°20′59″E		1247856	Upload Photo	Q26540123
Fairway	II	Waldershare Avenue, Sandwich Bay			24 March 1987	TR3636957359; 51°15′59″N 1°23′13″E		1247859	Upload Photo	Q26540126

== See also ==
- Grade I listed buildings in Kent
- Grade II* listed buildings in Kent

== Sources ==
- Newman, John (2013) [1969], Kent: North-East and East, The Buildings of England, New Haven and London: Yale University Press, ISBN 978-0-300-18506-5
