= Listed buildings in Sandwich, Kent =

Civil Parish in Kent, England

Sandwich is a town and civil parish in the Dover District of Kent, England. It contains seven grade I, 26 grade II* and 409 grade II listed buildings that are recorded in the National Heritage List for England.

This list is based on the information retrieved online from Historic England.

== Key ==
| Grade | Criteria |
|---|---|
| I | Buildings that are of exceptional interest |
| II* | Particularly important buildings of more than special interest |
| II | Buildings that are of special interest |

== Listings ==
| Name | Grade | Location | Type | Completed (Note: The date given is the date used by Historic England as significant for the initial building or that of an important part in the structure's description.) | Date designated | Grid ref. (Note: Sometimes known as OSGB36, the grid reference is based on the British national grid reference system used by the Ordnance Survey.) Geo-coordinates | Notes | Entry number (Note: The "List Entry Number" is a unique number assigned to each listed building and scheduled monument by Historic England.) | Image | Wikidata |
|---|---|---|---|---|---|---|---|---|---|---|
| Canterbury Gate House | II | Ash Road | | | 19 May 1950 | TR3259258527; 51°16′42″N 1°20′01″E | | 1343702 | Upload Photo | Q26627479 |
| The White Windmill | II | Ash Road | | | 19 May 1950 | TR3220358636; 51°16′46″N 1°19′41″E | | 1069758 | The White Windmill More images | Q7995059 |
| 2 and 4, Austen's Lane | II | 2 and 4, Austen's Lane | | | 23 April 1976 | TR3303858112; 51°16′28″N 1°20′23″E | | 1343703 | 2 and 4, Austen's Lane More images | Q26627480 |
| Spencer House | II | 6, Austen's Lane | | | 23 April 1976 | TR3304558117; 51°16′28″N 1°20′23″E | | 1069759 | Spencer House More images | Q26323032 |
| Water Lane House | II | 1, Bowling Street | | | 19 May 1950 | TR3290958288; 51°16′34″N 1°20′17″E | | 1343704 | Water Lane House More images | Q26627481 |
| 2, 4, 6, 8, 10 and 10A, Bowling Street | II | 2, 4, 6, 8, 10 and 10A, Bowling Street | | | 23 April 1976 | TR3291858274; 51°16′34″N 1°20′17″E | | 1343725 | 2, 4, 6, 8, 10 and 10A, Bowling Street More images | Q26627500 |
| 3, Bowling Street | II | 3, Bowling Street | | | 19 May 1950 | TR3291958299; 51°16′34″N 1°20′17″E | | 1069761 | 3, Bowling Street More images | Q26323036 |
| 5, Bowling Street | II | 5, Bowling Street | | | 19 May 1950 | TR3292358306; 51°16′35″N 1°20′18″E | | 1343705 | 5, Bowling Street More images | Q26627482 |
| Richborough House | II* | 7, Bowling Street | | | 19 May 1950 | TR3292858315; 51°16′35″N 1°20′18″E | | 1069762 | Richborough House More images | Q17557610 |
| 18, Bowling Street | II | 18, Bowling Street | | | 23 April 1976 | TR3293458304; 51°16′34″N 1°20′18″E | | 1069720 | 18, Bowling Street More images | Q26322954 |
| 19, Bowling Street | II | 19, Bowling Street | | | 23 April 1976 | TR3295458351; 51°16′36″N 1°20′19″E | | 1069718 | 19, Bowling Street More images | Q26322950 |
| 22, Bowling Street | II | 22, Bowling Street | | | 23 April 1976 | TR3293958309; 51°16′35″N 1°20′18″E | | 1343726 | 22, Bowling Street More images | Q26627501 |
| Pieces of Eight | II | 31, Bowling Street | | | 23 April 1976 | TR3297658379; 51°16′37″N 1°20′21″E | | 1069719 | Pieces of Eight More images | Q26322952 |
| 38, Bowling Street | II | 38, Bowling Street | | | 23 April 1976 | TR3297958366; 51°16′36″N 1°20′21″E | | 1069721 | 38, Bowling Street More images | Q26322956 |
| Bowling Cottage | II | Bowling Street | | | 23 April 1976 | TR3291358293; 51°16′34″N 1°20′17″E | | 1069760 | Bowling Cottage More images | Q26323034 |
| St Johns Hospital Almshouses | II | 1-6, Cattle Market | | | 23 April 1976 | TR3290658171; 51°16′30″N 1°20′16″E | | 1343731 | Upload Photo | Q26627506 |
| 2, Cattle Market | II | 2, Cattle Market | | | 19 May 1950 | TR3294158203; 51°16′31″N 1°20′18″E | | 1139045 | 2, Cattle Market More images | Q26431999 |
| 4, Cattle Market | II | 4, Cattle Market | | | 29 April 1970 | TR3294358194; 51°16′31″N 1°20′18″E | | 1069732 | 4, Cattle Market More images | Q26322977 |
| 6 and 8, Cattle Market | II | 6 and 8, Cattle Market | | | 23 April 1976 | TR3294158187; 51°16′31″N 1°20′18″E | | 1329930 | 6 and 8, Cattle Market More images | Q26615111 |
| 7, Cattle Market | II | 7, Cattle Market | | | 23 April 1976 | TR3299258165; 51°16′30″N 1°20′21″E | | 1069728 | 7, Cattle Market More images | Q26322971 |
| 9-11, Cattle Market | II | 9-11, Cattle Market | | | 29 April 1970 | TR3299858160; 51°16′30″N 1°20′21″E | | 1069729 | 9-11, Cattle Market More images | Q26322973 |
| 10 and 12, Cattle Market | II | 10 and 12, Cattle Market | | | 29 April 1970 | TR3294558178; 51°16′30″N 1°20′18″E | | 1069733 | 10 and 12, Cattle Market More images | Q26322979 |
| Water Pump to the Rear of No 11 | II | 11, Cattle Market | | | 23 April 1976 | TR3301058160; 51°16′30″N 1°20′22″E | | 1329927 | Upload Photo | Q26615109 |
| 14, Cattle Market | II | 14, Cattle Market | | | 23 April 1976 | TR3293858143; 51°16′29″N 1°20′18″E | | 1069734 | Upload Photo | Q26322981 |
| 16, Cattle Market | II | 16, Cattle Market | | | 23 April 1976 | TR3293658139; 51°16′29″N 1°20′18″E | | 1329924 | Upload Photo | Q26615107 |
| 20 and 22, Cattle Market | II | 20 and 22, Cattle Market | | | 23 April 1976 | TR3293058126; 51°16′29″N 1°20′18″E | | 1069735 | Upload Photo | Q26322983 |
| 31-35, Cattle Market | II | 31-35, Cattle Market | | | 23 April 1976 | TR3295058081; 51°16′27″N 1°20′18″E | | 1069730 | Upload Photo | Q26322975 |
| East Kent Road Car Former Office | II | Cattle Market | | | 30 October 1995 | TR3296758187; 51°16′31″N 1°20′20″E | | 1249733 | East Kent Road Car Former Office More images | Q26541839 |
| K6 Telephone Kiosk | II | Cattle Market | | | 18 May 2009 | TR3311857815; 51°16′18″N 1°20′27″E | | 1393294 | K6 Telephone Kiosk More images | Q26688577 |
| Sandwich United Reformed Church | II | Cattle Market | | | 23 April 1976 | TR3292358158; 51°16′30″N 1°20′17″E | | 1139026 | Upload Photo | Q26431982 |
| The Guildhall | II* | Cattle Market | | | 19 May 1950 | TR3295658147; 51°16′29″N 1°20′19″E | Externally all of 1910-12, inside Court Hall of 1578-9 | 1069731 | The Guildhall More images | Q17557607 |
| 1, Church Street St Clement's | II | 1, Church Street St Clement's | | | 23 April 1976 | TR3318658047; 51°16′26″N 1°20′31″E | | 1139016 | 1, Church Street St Clement's More images | Q26431975 |
| 3, Church Street St Clement's | II | 3, Church Street St Clement's | | | 23 April 1976 | TR3319958046; 51°16′26″N 1°20′31″E | | 1343734 | 3, Church Street St Clement's More images | Q26627509 |
| 9, Church Street Saint Clements | II | 9, Church Street St Clement's | | | 17 January 2006 | TR3323658040; 51°16′25″N 1°20′33″E | | 1391466 | Upload Photo | Q26670829 |
| 10 and 12, Church Street St Clement's | II | 10 and 12, Church Street St Clement's | | | 23 April 1976 | TR3321458030; 51°16′25″N 1°20′32″E | | 1329942 | 10 and 12, Church Street St Clement's More images | Q26615122 |
| 11, Church Street St Clement's | II | 11, Church Street St Clement's | | | 23 April 1976 | TR3324058039; 51°16′25″N 1°20′33″E | | 1069738 | Upload Photo | Q26322989 |
| 13, Church Street St Clement's | II | 13, Church Street St Clement's | | | 23 April 1976 | TR3324558038; 51°16′25″N 1°20′34″E | | 1069739 | Upload Photo | Q26322991 |
| Church of St Clement | I | Church Street St Clement's | | | 19 May 1950 | TR3328658006; 51°16′24″N 1°20′36″E | C12 central tower, two bay C13 N chapel, early C14 S chapel, nave rebuilt in C15 with perpendicular arcades, font octagonal 1405-7 | 1343695 | Church of St Clement More images | Q17529769 |
| Churchyard Walls at East Side of Church | II | Church Street St Clement's | | | 23 April 1976 | TR3330858016; 51°16′25″N 1°20′37″E | | 1343753 | Upload Photo | Q26627528 |
| 3-7, Church Street St Mary's | II | 3-7, Church Street St Mary's | | | 23 April 1976 | TR3285458332; 51°16′35″N 1°20′14″E | | 1069696 | 3-7, Church Street St Mary's More images | Q26322912 |
| Front Boundary Walling Between Nos 7 and 9 | II | 7 and 9, Church Street St Mary's | | | 23 April 1976 | TR3286458336; 51°16′36″N 1°20′15″E | | 1343754 | Front Boundary Walling Between Nos 7 and 9 More images | Q26627529 |
| The Kings Head | II | 9, Church Street St Mary's | | | 23 April 1976 | TR3286858344; 51°16′36″N 1°20′15″E | | 1069697 | The Kings Head More images | Q26322914 |
| 15-21, Church Street St Mary's | II | 15-21, Church Street St Mary's | | | 19 May 1950 | TR3289458368; 51°16′37″N 1°20′16″E | | 1069698 | 15-21, Church Street St Mary's More images | Q26322916 |
| 16-20, Church Street St Mary's | II | 16-20, Church Street St Mary's | | | 23 April 1976 | TR3290858365; 51°16′36″N 1°20′17″E | | 1069701 | 16-20, Church Street St Mary's More images | Q26322922 |
| Boundary wall between 20 and 22 Church Street St. Mary's | II | 20 and 22, Church Street St Mary's | | | 6 December 2013 | TR3292458362; 51°16′36″N 1°20′18″E | | 1417089 | Upload Photo | Q26676570 |
| The Drum | II | 22, Church Street St Mary's | | | 19 May 1950 | TR3291458374; 51°16′37″N 1°20′17″E | | 1069702 | The Drum More images | Q26322924 |
| 26, Church Street St Mary's | II | 26, Church Street St Mary's | | | 23 April 1976 | TR3291858380; 51°16′37″N 1°20′18″E | | 1343718 | 26, Church Street St Mary's More images | Q26627494 |
| 28-32, Church Street St Mary's | II | 28-32, Church Street St Mary's | | | 19 May 1950 | TR3292458389; 51°16′37″N 1°20′18″E | | 1318901 | 28-32, Church Street St Mary's More images | Q26605012 |
| 29, Church Street St Mary's | II | 29, Church Street St Mary's | | | 29 April 1970 | TR3290858388; 51°16′37″N 1°20′17″E | | 1069699 | 29, Church Street St Mary's More images | Q26322918 |
| 23-27, Church Street St Mary's | II | 23-27, Church Street St Mary's | | | 29 April 1970 | TR3290458381; 51°16′37″N 1°20′17″E | | 1343715 | 23-27, Church Street St Mary's More images | Q26627492 |
| Hurstmead Woodroft Cottage | II | 33, Church Street St Mary's | | | 23 April 1976 | TR3291258392; 51°16′37″N 1°20′17″E | | 1343716 | Hurstmead Woodroft Cottage More images | Q26627493 |
| Boundary Walling Between Nos 32 and 34 | II | 32 and 34, Church Street St Mary's | | | 23 April 1976 | TR3293558393; 51°16′37″N 1°20′18″E | | 1069704 | Upload Photo | Q26322928 |
| 34, Church Street St Mary's | II | 34, Church Street St Mary's | | | 23 April 1976 | TR3293058382; 51°16′37″N 1°20′18″E | | 1069703 | Upload Photo | Q26322926 |
| Former Site of Nos 8 and 10 and Boundary Walling | II | Church Street St Mary's | | | 23 April 1976 | TR3287158334; 51°16′36″N 1°20′15″E | | 1069700 | Upload Photo | Q26322920 |
| World War II anti-tank pimples and cylinders and associated pillbox at Pegwell Bay | II | Cliffsend | | | 1 May 2014 | TR3416063024; 51°19′05″N 1°21′32″E | | 1413803 | Upload Photo | Q26676365 |
| Boundary Walling to the Rear of No 75 Strand Street | II | Cottage Row | | | 23 April 1976 | TR3286158445; 51°16′39″N 1°20′15″E | | 1318907 | Upload Photo | Q26605018 |
| 4, Delf Street | II | 4, Delf Street | | | 23 April 1976 | TR3302558165; 51°16′30″N 1°20′23″E | | 1343719 | 4, Delf Street More images | Q26627495 |
| The Fleur De Lys Hotel | II | 6-10, Delf Street | | | 23 April 1976 | TR3300358182; 51°16′30″N 1°20′21″E | | 1069705 | The Fleur De Lys Hotel More images | Q26322930 |
| 12, Delf Street | II | 12, Delf Street | | | 23 April 1976 | TR3298158197; 51°16′31″N 1°20′20″E | | 1299061 | 12, Delf Street More images | Q26586488 |
| 15, Delf Street | II | 15, Delf Street | | | 23 April 1976 | TR3290258186; 51°16′31″N 1°20′16″E | | 1069710 | Upload Photo | Q26322938 |
| Malt Shovel House | II | 17, Delf Street | | | 19 May 1950 | TR3291758223; 51°16′32″N 1°20′17″E | | 1069711 | Malt Shovel House More images | Q26322940 |
| 19, Delf Street | II | 19, Delf Street | | | 19 May 1950 | TR3291258228; 51°16′32″N 1°20′17″E | | 1186747 | 19, Delf Street More images | Q26481986 |
| Boundary Walling at Rear of No 21 | II | 21, Delf Street | | | 23 April 1976 | TR3289358207; 51°16′31″N 1°20′16″E | | 1343720 | Upload Photo | Q26627496 |
| Delf House | II* | 21, Delf Street | | | 19 May 1950 | TR3290458232; 51°16′32″N 1°20′16″E | | 1069712 | Delf House More images | Q17557599 |
| Delf Cottage | II | 27, Delf Street | | | 19 May 1950 | TR3289058254; 51°16′33″N 1°20′16″E | | 1299028 | Delf Cottage More images | Q26586459 |
| Claypipes Cobblers | II | 30, Delf Street | | | 23 April 1976 | TR3292258243; 51°16′33″N 1°20′17″E | | 1069706 | Claypipes Cobblers More images | Q26322932 |
| 32 and 34, Delf Street | II | 32 and 34, Delf Street | | | 23 April 1976 | TR3291558250; 51°16′33″N 1°20′17″E | | 1299062 | 32 and 34, Delf Street More images | Q26586489 |
| 36, Delf Street | II | 36, Delf Street | | | 29 April 1970 | TR3290858256; 51°16′33″N 1°20′17″E | | 1069707 | 36, Delf Street More images | Q26322934 |
| Stuart House | II* | 38, Delf Street | | | 23 April 1976 | TR3288958307; 51°16′35″N 1°20′16″E | | 1069708 | Upload Photo | Q17557593 |
| Farthings | II | 39, Delf Street | | | 23 April 1976 | TR3287558274; 51°16′34″N 1°20′15″E | | 1069713 | Farthings More images | Q26322942 |
| 41 and 43, Delf Street | II | 41 and 43, Delf Street | | | 19 May 1950 | TR3286658287; 51°16′34″N 1°20′15″E | | 1186753 | 41 and 43, Delf Street More images | Q26481992 |
| Boundary Walling Between the Cinema and No 2 Cattle Market | II | Delf Street | | | 23 April 1976 | TR3291958204; 51°16′31″N 1°20′17″E | | 1186744 | Upload Photo | Q26481984 |
| Front Boundary Walling of Stuart House | II | Delf Street | | | 23 April 1976 | TR3287258299; 51°16′34″N 1°20′15″E | | 1069709 | Upload Photo | Q26322936 |
| Outbuilding on the Corner of Delf Street and Church Street St Mary, in the Grounds of Stuart House | II | Delf Street | | | 23 April 1976 | TR3286358324; 51°16′35″N 1°20′15″E | | 1186740 | Upload Photo | Q26481980 |
| Return Walling, Boundary of No 43 and the Delf Stream | II | Delf Street | | | 23 April 1976 | TR3285658291; 51°16′34″N 1°20′14″E | | 1343721 | Return Walling, Boundary of No 43 and the Delf Stream More images | Q26627497 |
| St Barts | II | 4 and 5, Dover Road | | | 23 April 1976 | TR3301957499; 51°16′08″N 1°20′21″E | | 1343743 | Upload Photo | Q66477541 |
| St Barts | II | 13, Dover Road | | | 23 April 1976 | TR3305757486; 51°16′08″N 1°20′23″E | | 1343723 | Upload Photo | Q26893578 |
| St Barts | II | 14, Dover Road | | | 23 April 1976 | TR3306657521; 51°16′09″N 1°20′23″E | | 1343744 | Upload Photo | Q66480465 |
| Former St Barts House (Wardens House) | II | 17, Dover Road | | | 23 April 1976 | TR3305957475; 51°16′07″N 1°20′23″E | | 1299035 | Upload Photo | Q26586465 |
| Katescott | II | 66, Dover Road | | | 23 April 1976 | TR3294957279; 51°16′01″N 1°20′17″E | | 1343746 | Upload Photo | Q26627521 |
| 62, Dover Road | II | 62, Dover Road | | | 23 April 1976 | TR3295757287; 51°16′02″N 1°20′17″E | | 1069677 | Upload Photo | Q26322874 |
| Bartlemas | II* | Dover Road | | | 19 May 1950 | TR3308057572; 51°16′11″N 1°20′24″E | | 1069714 | Upload Photo | Q17557603 |
| Boundary Walling of Bartlemas on North and East Sides | II | Dover Road | | | 23 April 1976 | TR3310557600; 51°16′11″N 1°20′25″E | | 1186758 | Upload Photo | Q26481996 |
| Footbridge at Sandwich Railway Station | II | Dover Road | | | 19 October 1995 | TR3322757622; 51°16′12″N 1°20′32″E | | 1249732 | Footbridge at Sandwich Railway Station More images | Q26541838 |
| Front boundary walling to Dover Road of No 16 St Bartholomews | II | Dover Road | | | 23 April 1976 | TR3310757533; 51°16′09″N 1°20′25″E | | 1069716 | Upload Photo | Q26322946 |
| Long Barn Adjoining Boundary of Bartlemas and to the North West of No 14 St Barts | II | Dover Road | | | 23 April 1976 | TR3305357548; 51°16′10″N 1°20′23″E | | 1069675 | Upload Photo | Q26322870 |
| Passenger Shelter, Sandwich Railway Station | II | Dover Road | | | 19 October 1995 | TR3325457600; 51°16′11″N 1°20′33″E | | 1263601 | Passenger Shelter, Sandwich Railway Station More images | Q26554380 |
| Sandwich Railway Station | II | Dover Road | | | 19 October 1995 | TR3325457617; 51°16′12″N 1°20′33″E | 1847 built for the South Eastern Railway | 1249731 | Sandwich Railway Station More images | Q1977660 |
| Stone Cross House | II | Dover Road | | | 23 April 1976 | TR3289257219; 51°15′59″N 1°20′13″E | | 1069678 | Upload Photo | Q26322877 |
| Stone Wall on South Side of St Barts Road, to the North West of the Long Barn | II | Dover Road | | | 23 April 1976 | TR3304557575; 51°16′11″N 1°20′22″E | | 1343745 | Upload Photo | Q26627520 |
| Water Pump Adjoining the Chapel Wall on the North East Side of the Chapel | II | Dover Road | | | 23 April 1976 | TR3305857515; 51°16′09″N 1°20′23″E | | 1069674 | Upload Photo | Q26322868 |
| Ferryway | II | 1, Fisher Street | | | 19 May 1950 | TR3325258130; 51°16′28″N 1°20′34″E | | 1343747 | Ferryway More images | Q26627522 |
| 3, Fisher Street | II | 3, Fisher Street | | | 29 April 1970 | TR3324958123; 51°16′28″N 1°20′34″E | | 1069679 | 3, Fisher Street More images | Q26322879 |
| 5 and 7, Fisher Street | II | 5 and 7, Fisher Street | | | 19 May 1950 | TR3324658114; 51°16′28″N 1°20′34″E | | 1069680 | 5 and 7, Fisher Street More images | Q26322881 |
| 9, Fisher Street | II | 9, Fisher Street | | | 29 April 1970 | TR3324358105; 51°16′28″N 1°20′34″E | | 1087065 | 9, Fisher Street More images | Q26379546 |
| 11, Fisher Street | II | 11, Fisher Street | | | 29 April 1970 | TR3324358100; 51°16′27″N 1°20′34″E | | 1343748 | 11, Fisher Street More images | Q26627523 |
| 13, Fisher Street | II | 13, Fisher Street | | | 29 April 1970 | TR3324258095; 51°16′27″N 1°20′34″E | | 1069681 | 13, Fisher Street More images | Q26322883 |
| 14 and 16, Fisher Street | II | 14 and 16, Fisher Street | | | 23 April 1976 | TR3323358113; 51°16′28″N 1°20′33″E | | 1069685 | 14 and 16, Fisher Street More images | Q26322892 |
| 15 and 17, Fisher Street | II | 15 and 17, Fisher Street | | | 29 April 1970 | TR3324058090; 51°16′27″N 1°20′33″E | | 1087067 | 15 and 17, Fisher Street More images | Q26379548 |
| 19, Fisher Street | II | 19, Fisher Street | | | 23 April 1976 | TR3323858083; 51°16′27″N 1°20′33″E | | 1343749 | 19, Fisher Street More images | Q26627524 |
| 20, Fisher Street | II | 20, Fisher Street | | | 23 April 1976 | TR3322958096; 51°16′27″N 1°20′33″E | | 1087038 | 20, Fisher Street More images | Q26379523 |
| 21, Fisher Street | II | 21, Fisher Street | | | 23 April 1976 | TR3323758079; 51°16′27″N 1°20′33″E | | 1335858 | 21, Fisher Street More images | Q26620411 |
| 22 and 24, Fisher Street | II | 22 and 24, Fisher Street | | | 29 April 1970 | TR3322458081; 51°16′27″N 1°20′33″E | | 1069686 | 22 and 24, Fisher Street More images | Q26322894 |
| 23, Fisher Street | II | 23, Fisher Street | | | 29 April 1970 | TR3323758073; 51°16′27″N 1°20′33″E | | 1069682 | 23, Fisher Street More images | Q26322885 |
| No 26 (Now Forms Part of One House With No 28) | II | 26, Fisher Street | | | 29 April 1970 | TR3322258069; 51°16′26″N 1°20′32″E | | 1335843 | No 26 (Now Forms Part of One House With No 28) More images | Q26620399 |
| Clarence House | II | 28, Fisher Street | | | 19 May 1950 | TR3321958061; 51°16′26″N 1°20′32″E | | 1069687 | Clarence House More images | Q26322896 |
| 27 and 29, Fisher Street | II | 27 and 29, Fisher Street | | | 29 April 1970 | TR3323458064; 51°16′26″N 1°20′33″E | | 1069683 | 27 and 29, Fisher Street More images | Q26322888 |
| 30 and 32, Fisher Street | II | 30 and 32, Fisher Street | | | 29 April 1970 | TR3321758053; 51°16′26″N 1°20′32″E | | 1069688 | 30 and 32, Fisher Street More images | Q26322898 |
| 31, Fisher Street | II | 31, Fisher Street | | | 19 May 1950 | TR3323158056; 51°16′26″N 1°20′33″E | | 1335859 | 31, Fisher Street More images | Q26620412 |
| 33, Fisher Street, 7, Church Street St Clement's | II | 33, Fisher Street, 7, Church Street St Clement's | | | 29 April 1970 | TR3322658045; 51°16′26″N 1°20′33″E | | 1069684 | 33, Fisher Street, 7, Church Street St Clement's More images | Q26322890 |
| 34, Fisher Street, 5, Church Street St Clement's | II | 34, Fisher Street, 5, Church Street St Clement's | | | 23 April 1976 | TR3321658044; 51°16′26″N 1°20′32″E | | 1335845 | 34, Fisher Street, 5, Church Street St Clement's More images | Q26620401 |
| 1, Galliard Street | II | 1, Galliard Street | | | 19 May 1950 | TR3313957953; 51°16′23″N 1°20′28″E | | 1069689 | Upload Photo | Q26322900 |
| 3, Galliard Street | II | 3, Galliard Street | | | 23 April 1976 | TR3314557957; 51°16′23″N 1°20′28″E | | 1069690 | Upload Photo | Q26322902 |
| 7, Galliard Street, 68 King Street | II | 7, Galliard Street, 68 King Street | | | 23 April 1976 | TR3316357968; 51°16′23″N 1°20′29″E | | 1105689 | Upload Photo | Q26399620 |
| Guildcount House | II | 1, Guildcount Lane | | | 19 May 1950 | TR3298858289; 51°16′34″N 1°20′21″E | | 1069691 | Guildcount House More images | Q26322904 |
| Boundary Walling Between Nos 1 and 3 | II | 1 and 3, Guildcount Lane | | | 23 April 1976 | TR3297558295; 51°16′34″N 1°20′20″E | | 1087050 | Boundary Walling Between Nos 1 and 3 More images | Q26379534 |
| 3, Guildcount Lane | II | 3, Guildcount Lane | | | 23 April 1976 | TR3296358299; 51°16′34″N 1°20′20″E | | 1343750 | 3, Guildcount Lane More images | Q26627525 |
| 5-9, Guildcount Lane | II | 5-9, Guildcount Lane | | | 23 April 1976 | TR3295458305; 51°16′34″N 1°20′19″E | | 1069692 | 5-9, Guildcount Lane More images | Q26322906 |
| The Cottage | II | 11, Guildcount Lane | | | 23 April 1976 | TR3294558313; 51°16′35″N 1°20′19″E | | 1087052 | The Cottage More images | Q26379536 |
| 3, Harnet Street | II | 3, Harnet Street | | | 19 May 1950 | TR3295858228; 51°16′32″N 1°20′19″E | | 1343751 | 3, Harnet Street More images | Q26627526 |
| 5 and 7, Harnet Street | II | 5 and 7, Harnet Street | | | 23 April 1976 | TR3296258234; 51°16′32″N 1°20′19″E | | 1069693 | 5 and 7, Harnet Street More images | Q26322908 |
| Crammond House | II | 11 and 13, Harnet Street | | | 19 May 1950 | TR3297258253; 51°16′33″N 1°20′20″E | | 1335875 | Crammond House More images | Q26620426 |
| Ha'penny House | II | 14, Harnet Street | | | 23 April 1976 | TR3299058250; 51°16′33″N 1°20′21″E | | 1069651 | Ha'penny House More images | Q26322826 |
| Boundary Walling South of No 14 | II | 14, Harnet Street | | | 23 April 1976 | TR3297958227; 51°16′32″N 1°20′20″E | | 1343773 | Boundary Walling South of No 14 More images | Q26627546 |
| Gate Piers to North of No 14 | II | 14, Harnet Street | | | 23 April 1976 | TR3299258258; 51°16′33″N 1°20′21″E | | 1069652 | Upload Photo | Q26322828 |
| 15 and 17, Harnet Street | II | 15 and 17, Harnet Street | | | 23 April 1976 | TR3297958263; 51°16′33″N 1°20′20″E | | 1069694 | 15 and 17, Harnet Street More images | Q26322910 |
| 18 and 20, Harnet Street | II | 18 and 20, Harnet Street | | | 23 April 1976 | TR3299758265; 51°16′33″N 1°20′21″E | | 1343774 | 18 and 20, Harnet Street More images | Q26627547 |
| 19, Harnet Street | II | 19, Harnet Street | | | 23 April 1976 | TR3298158268; 51°16′33″N 1°20′21″E | | 1335877 | 19, Harnet Street More images | Q26620428 |
| The Haven Guest House | II* | 29, Harnet Street | | | 19 May 1950 | TR3300258319; 51°16′35″N 1°20′22″E | | 1069695 | The Haven Guest House More images | Q17557549 |
| 30-38, Harnet Street | II | 30-38, Harnet Street | | | 23 April 1976 | TR3301658312; 51°16′35″N 1°20′22″E | | 1069654 | 30-38, Harnet Street More images | Q26322832 |
| Milestone at South West Corner of No 30 | II | 30, Harnet Street | | | 23 April 1976 | TR3300658299; 51°16′34″N 1°20′22″E | | 1069653 | Upload Photo | Q26322830 |
| 31, Harnet Street | II | 31, Harnet Street | | | 29 April 1970 | TR3300958327; 51°16′35″N 1°20′22″E | | 1335880 | 31, Harnet Street More images | Q26620431 |
| 33 and 35, Harnet Street | II | 33 and 35, Harnet Street | | | 23 April 1976 | TR3302058333; 51°16′35″N 1°20′23″E | | 1069650 | 33 and 35, Harnet Street More images | Q26322824 |
| Boundary walling to south west, north and north west of 29 Harnet Street | II | Harnet Street | | | 29 April 1970 | TR3299958300; 51°16′34″N 1°20′22″E | | 1343752 | Boundary walling to south west, north and north west of 29 Harnet Street More images | Q26627527 |
| The Crispin Inn | II | 4, High Street | | | 19 May 1950 | TR3316658249; 51°16′32″N 1°20′30″E | | 1343736 | The Crispin Inn More images | Q26627511 |
| The Admiral Owen Public House | II* | 8, High Street | | | 19 May 1950 | TR3315758231; 51°16′32″N 1°20′29″E | | 1069656 | The Admiral Owen Public House | Q17557538 |
| 17 and 19, High Street | II | 17 and 19, High Street | | | 23 April 1976 | TR3316658182; 51°16′30″N 1°20′30″E | | 1069668 | Upload Photo | Q26322857 |
| Pellicane House | II* | 22, High Street | | | 19 May 1950 | TR3314958170; 51°16′30″N 1°20′29″E | | 1335883 | Upload Photo | Q17557852 |
| West Croft | II | 25, High Street | | | 19 May 1950 | TR3316858163; 51°16′30″N 1°20′30″E | | 1096843 | Upload Photo | Q26389107 |
| St George's House | II | 27, High Street | | | 23 April 1976 | TR3316958154; 51°16′29″N 1°20′30″E | | 1069669 | Upload Photo | Q26322858 |
| Preston House | II | 29, High Street | | | 19 May 1950 | TR3316958147; 51°16′29″N 1°20′30″E | | 1096844 | Upload Photo | Q26389108 |
| Norfolk House | II | 44, High Street | | | 19 May 1950 | TR3316158095; 51°16′27″N 1°20′29″E | | 1069663 | Upload Photo | Q26322847 |
| Boundary Stone in Front Wall of No 44 | II | 44, High Street | | | 23 April 1976 | TR3316658090; 51°16′27″N 1°20′30″E | | 1069664 | Upload Photo | Q26322848 |
| Cinque Ports House | II | 60, High Street | | | 23 April 1976 | TR3317258036; 51°16′25″N 1°20′30″E | | 1086947 | Cinque Ports House More images | Q26379362 |
| 10, High Street | II | 10, High Street | | | 23 April 1976 | TR3315558220; 51°16′31″N 1°20′29″E | | 1069657 | Upload Photo | Q26322835 |
| 15, High Street | II | 15, High Street | | | 23 April 1976 | TR3316558190; 51°16′30″N 1°20′30″E | | 1086953 | Upload Photo | Q26379391 |
| 20, High Street | II | 20, High Street | | | 29 April 1970 | TR3314958182; 51°16′30″N 1°20′29″E | | 1343738 | Upload Photo | Q26627513 |
| 23, High Street | II | 23, High Street | | | 23 April 1976 | TR3316758171; 51°16′30″N 1°20′30″E | | 1343740 | Upload Photo | Q26627515 |
| 24, High Street | II | 24, High Street | | | 23 April 1976 | TR3315058153; 51°16′29″N 1°20′29″E | | 1069659 | Upload Photo | Q26322839 |
| 26, High Street | II | 26, High Street | | | 23 April 1976 | TR3315158147; 51°16′29″N 1°20′29″E | | 1343739 | Upload Photo | Q26627514 |
| 28, High Street | II | 28, High Street | | | 19 May 1950 | TR3315158139; 51°16′29″N 1°20′29″E | | 1086964 | Upload Photo | Q26379436 |
| 30, High Street | II | 30, High Street | | | 23 April 1976 | TR3315358130; 51°16′29″N 1°20′29″E | | 1069660 | Upload Photo | Q26322841 |
| 31, High Street | II | 31, High Street | | | 29 April 1970 | TR3317958140; 51°16′29″N 1°20′30″E | | 1069670 | Upload Photo | Q26322861 |
| 31A, High Street | II | 31A, High Street | | | 23 April 1976 | TR3318658136; 51°16′29″N 1°20′31″E | | 1343741 | Upload Photo | Q26627516 |
| 32, High Street | II | 32, High Street | | | 23 April 1976 | TR3315458126; 51°16′28″N 1°20′29″E | | 1086970 | Upload Photo | Q26379452 |
| 34, High Street | II | 34, High Street | | | 19 May 1950 | TR3315558121; 51°16′28″N 1°20′29″E | | 1069661 | Upload Photo | Q26322843 |
| 37 and 39, High Street | II | 37 and 39, High Street | | | 19 May 1950 | TR3317558113; 51°16′28″N 1°20′30″E | | 1096853 | Upload Photo | Q26389117 |
| 40, High Street | II | 40, High Street | | | 19 May 1950 | TR3315858107; 51°16′28″N 1°20′29″E | | 1069662 | Upload Photo | Q26322844 |
| 41, High Street | II | 41, High Street | | | 23 April 1976 | TR3317858102; 51°16′28″N 1°20′30″E | | 1069671 | Upload Photo | Q26322862 |
| 42, High Street | II | 42, High Street | | | 19 May 1950 | TR3315958102; 51°16′28″N 1°20′29″E | | 1335914 | Upload Photo | Q26620461 |
| 43, High Street | II | 43, High Street | | | 23 April 1976 | TR3317958094; 51°16′27″N 1°20′30″E | | 1343742 | Upload Photo | Q26627517 |
| 45, High Street | II | 45, High Street | | | 23 April 1976 | TR3318058090; 51°16′27″N 1°20′30″E | | 1096859 | Upload Photo | Q26389123 |
| 46-50, High Street | II | 46-50, High Street | | | 30 June 1976 | TR3316458080; 51°16′27″N 1°20′29″E | | 1263599 | Upload Photo | Q26554378 |
| 47, High Street | II | 47, High Street | | | 23 April 1976 | TR3318158084; 51°16′27″N 1°20′30″E | | 1069672 | Upload Photo | Q26322864 |
| 49 and 51, High Street | II | 49 and 51, High Street | | | 23 April 1976 | TR3318158079; 51°16′27″N 1°20′30″E | | 1104919 | 49 and 51, High Street More images | Q26398878 |
| 53, High Street | II | 53, High Street | | | 23 April 1976 | TR3318158067; 51°16′26″N 1°20′30″E | | 1343762 | Upload Photo | Q26627536 |
| 54, High Street | II | 54, High Street | | | 23 April 1976 | TR3317058055; 51°16′26″N 1°20′30″E | | 1086944 | 54, High Street More images | Q26379351 |
| 55, High Street | II | 55, High Street | | | 23 April 1976 | TR3318258060; 51°16′26″N 1°20′30″E | | 1069628 | 55, High Street More images | Q26322785 |
| 56 and 58, High Street | II | 56 and 58, High Street | | | 23 April 1976 | TR3317258046; 51°16′26″N 1°20′30″E | | 1069665 | Upload Photo | Q26322851 |
| 57, High Street | II | 57, High Street | | | 23 April 1976 | TR3318458052; 51°16′26″N 1°20′30″E | | 1069629 | 57, High Street More images | Q26322787 |
| 3 Bollards at Entrance to Seven Post Alley | II | High Street | | | 23 April 1976 | TR3315558203; 51°16′31″N 1°20′29″E | | 1069658 | Upload Photo | Q26322836 |
| Boundary Walling on North and South Side of Entrance to Seven Post Alley | II | High Street | | | 23 April 1976 | TR3314758205; 51°16′31″N 1°20′29″E | | 1343737 | Upload Photo | Q26627512 |
| Gas Lamp at Corner Near High Street in Seven Post Alley | II | High Street | | | 23 April 1976 | TR3314458203; 51°16′31″N 1°20′29″E | | 1335861 | Upload Photo | Q26620414 |
| The Barbican | I | High Street | | | 19 May 1950 | TR3318058258; 51°16′33″N 1°20′31″E | | 1069655 | The Barbican More images | Q17529698 |
| The Bell Hotel | II | High Street | | | 23 April 1976 | TR3319258217; 51°16′31″N 1°20′31″E | | 1069666 | The Bell Hotel More images | Q26322853 |
| The Toll Bridge | II | High Street | | | 23 April 1976 | TR3319358285; 51°16′33″N 1°20′31″E | | 1343735 | The Toll Bridge More images | Q26627510 |
| 1 and 3, King Street | II | 1 and 3, King Street | | | 19 May 1950 | TR3304258152; 51°16′29″N 1°20′23″E | | 1343763 | 1 and 3, King Street More images | Q26627537 |
| 4 and 6, King Street | II | 4 and 6, King Street | | | 23 April 1976 | TR3303158146; 51°16′29″N 1°20′23″E | | 1343766 | 4 and 6, King Street | Q26627539 |
| 5, King Street | II* | 5, King Street | | | 19 May 1950 | TR3307958120; 51°16′28″N 1°20′25″E | | 1069630 | 5, King Street More images | Q17557527 |
| 7, King Street | II | 7, King Street | | | 23 April 1976 | TR3308758111; 51°16′28″N 1°20′26″E | | 1343764 | 7, King Street More images | Q26627538 |
| 10, King Street | II | 10, King Street | | | 23 April 1976 | TR3304958133; 51°16′29″N 1°20′24″E | | 1069634 | 10, King Street More images | Q26322795 |
| 12 and 14, King Street | II | 12 and 14, King Street | | | 23 April 1976 | TR3306058121; 51°16′28″N 1°20′24″E | | 1343767 | 12 and 14, King Street | Q26627540 |
| 16, King Street | II | 16, King Street | | | 23 April 1976 | TR3306558115; 51°16′28″N 1°20′24″E | | 1104883 | 16, King Street More images | Q26398847 |
| 18, King Street | II | 18, King Street | | | 23 April 1976 | TR3306958110; 51°16′28″N 1°20′25″E | | 1069635 | 18, King Street More images | Q26322797 |
| 19 and 19A, King Street | II | 19 and 19A, King Street | | | 23 April 1976 | TR3311758088; 51°16′27″N 1°20′27″E | | 1069631 | 19 and 19A, King Street More images | Q26322789 |
| 21, King Street | II* | 21, King Street | | | 19 May 1950 | TR3315558053; 51°16′26″N 1°20′29″E | | 1343765 | 21, King Street More images | Q17557870 |
| Outhouse to South of No 21 | II | 21, King Street | | | 19 May 1950 | TR3315658043; 51°16′26″N 1°20′29″E | | 1069632 | Outhouse to South of No 21 More images | Q26322791 |
| 24 and 24A, King Street | II | 24 and 24A, King Street | | | 23 April 1976 | TR3308658092; 51°16′27″N 1°20′26″E | | 1326672 | 24 and 24A, King Street More images | Q26612138 |
| 26, King Street | II | 26, King Street | | | 23 April 1976 | TR3309358087; 51°16′27″N 1°20′26″E | | 1069636 | 26, King Street More images | Q26322799 |
| 27 and 29, King Street | II | 27 and 29, King Street | | | 29 April 1970 | TR3316558022; 51°16′25″N 1°20′29″E | | 1069633 | 27 and 29, King Street More images | Q26322793 |
| 28, King Street | II | 28, King Street | | | 23 April 1976 | TR3309958082; 51°16′27″N 1°20′26″E | | 1343768 | 28, King Street More images | Q26627541 |
| 38, King Street | II | 38, King Street | | | 23 April 1976 | TR3312758062; 51°16′26″N 1°20′28″E | | 1104890 | 38, King Street More images | Q26398852 |
| 40 and 40A, King Street | II | 40 40A, King Street | | | 23 April 1976 | TR3313158057; 51°16′26″N 1°20′28″E | | 1069637 | 40 and 40A, King Street More images | Q26322801 |
| 42, King Street | II | 42, King Street | | | 19 May 1950 | TR3313558052; 51°16′26″N 1°20′28″E | | 1343769 | 42, King Street More images | Q26627542 |
| 44 and 46, King Street | II | 44 and 46, King Street | | | 29 April 1970 | TR3313858047; 51°16′26″N 1°20′28″E | | 1104857 | 44 and 46, King Street More images | Q26398824 |
| 48, King Street | II | 48, King Street | | | 19 May 1950 | TR3314158039; 51°16′26″N 1°20′28″E | | 1069638 | 48, King Street More images | Q26322803 |
| Petersham House | II* | 50, King Street | | | 19 May 1950 | TR3314558032; 51°16′25″N 1°20′28″E | | 1105686 | Petersham House More images | Q17557720 |
| Luckboat House | II* | 52, King Street | | | 19 May 1950 | TR3314758023; 51°16′25″N 1°20′28″E | | 1069639 | Luckboat House More images | Q17557532 |
| The Dutch House | II* | 62, King Street | | | 19 May 1950 | TR3315657986; 51°16′24″N 1°20′29″E | | 1105688 | The Dutch House More images | Q17557724 |
| 60, King Street | II | 60, King Street | | | 23 April 1976 | TR3315357995; 51°16′24″N 1°20′29″E | | 1069640 | Upload Photo | Q26322805 |
| 64, King Street | II | 64, King Street | | | 19 May 1950 | TR3316057979; 51°16′24″N 1°20′29″E | | 1069641 | Upload Photo | Q26322807 |
| 66, King Street | II | 66, King Street | | | 23 April 1976 | TR3316157975; 51°16′23″N 1°20′29″E | | 1069642 | Upload Photo | Q26322809 |
| 2-6, Knightrider Street | II | 2-6, Knightrider Street | | | 23 April 1976 | TR3332658156; 51°16′29″N 1°20′38″E | | 1105694 | 2-6, Knightrider Street More images | Q26399625 |
| 8, Knightrider Street | II | 8, Knightrider Street | | | 23 April 1976 | TR3332158145; 51°16′29″N 1°20′38″E | | 1069646 | Upload Photo | Q26322816 |
| 14, Knightrider Street | II | 14, Knightrider Street | | | 23 April 1976 | TR3329758098; 51°16′27″N 1°20′36″E | | 1069647 | 14, Knightrider Street More images | Q26322818 |
| 16 and 18, Knightrider Street | II | 16 and 18, Knightrider Street | | | 23 April 1976 | TR3329458077; 51°16′27″N 1°20′36″E | | 1105642 | 16 and 18, Knightrider Street More images | Q26399577 |
| Boundary Walls Around the Salutation on the North, West and South Sides and Post Box | II | Knightrider Street | | | 23 April 1976 | TR3332858138; 51°16′29″N 1°20′38″E | | 1069645 | Upload Photo | Q26322814 |
| Outhouses in the Garden to the North West of the Salutation | II | Knightrider Street | | | 23 April 1976 | TR3334758153; 51°16′29″N 1°20′39″E | | 1105692 | Outhouses in the Garden to the North West of the Salutation More images | Q26399623 |
| Salutation Cottage and Gateway | II | Knightrider Street | | | 29 April 1970 | TR3332158116; 51°16′28″N 1°20′38″E | | 1069644 | Salutation Cottage and Gateway More images | Q26322811 |
| The Salutation | I | Knightrider Street | | | 19 May 1950 | TR3336658124; 51°16′28″N 1°20′40″E | | 1069643 | The Salutation More images | Q16934432 |
| The Old Cottage | II | Loop Street | | | 19 May 1950 | TR3283058319; 51°16′35″N 1°20′13″E | | 1343770 | The Old Cottage More images | Q26627543 |
| 1 and 3, Market Street | II | 1 and 3, Market Street | | | 23 April 1976 | TR3303258170; 51°16′30″N 1°20′23″E | | 1106260 | 1 and 3, Market Street More images | Q26400136 |
| 2, Market Street | II | 2, Market Street | | | 19 May 1950 | TR3303958162; 51°16′30″N 1°20′23″E | | 1105644 | 2, Market Street More images | Q26399579 |
| 4-10, Market Street | II | 4-10, Market Street | | | 23 April 1976 | TR3306158196; 51°16′31″N 1°20′24″E | | 1106252 | 4-10, Market Street More images | Q26400130 |
| 5, Market Street | II | 5, Market Street | | | 23 April 1976 | TR3303458181; 51°16′30″N 1°20′23″E | | 1343791 | 5, Market Street More images | Q26627563 |
| 7 and 9, Market Street | II | 7 and 9, Market Street | | | 23 April 1976 | TR3303658190; 51°16′31″N 1°20′23″E | | 1069605 | 7 and 9, Market Street More images | Q26322740 |
| Rear Boundary Walling of Nos 13 to 19 (Odd) | II | 13-19, Market Street | | | 23 April 1976 | TR3301058220; 51°16′32″N 1°20′22″E | | 1343792 | Upload Photo | Q26627564 |
| 14 and 16, Market Street | II | 14 and 16, Market Street | | | 23 April 1976 | TR3305758221; 51°16′32″N 1°20′24″E | | 1069649 | 14 and 16, Market Street More images | Q26322822 |
| The Golden Key | II | 15, Market Street | | | 3 February 1987 | TR3303858216; 51°16′31″N 1°20′23″E | | 1263597 | The Golden Key More images | Q26554376 |
| 20 and 22, Market Street | II | 20 and 22, Market Street | | | 23 April 1976 | TR3305758237; 51°16′32″N 1°20′24″E | | 1343772 | 20 and 22, Market Street More images | Q26627545 |
| 21, Market Street | II | 21, Market Street | | | 29 April 1970 | TR3303458243; 51°16′32″N 1°20′23″E | | 1069606 | 21, Market Street More images | Q26322742 |
| Rear Boundary Walling of No 21 | II | 21, Market Street | | | 23 April 1976 | TR3301258247; 51°16′32″N 1°20′22″E | | 1069607 | Upload Photo | Q26322744 |
| Old Milk Alley Flat | II | Market Street | | | 23 April 1976 | TR3307258188; 51°16′31″N 1°20′25″E | | 1343771 | Old Milk Alley Flat More images | Q26627544 |
| Sandwich War Memorial | II | Market Street | | | 13 January 2011 | TR3305058174; 51°16′30″N 1°20′24″E | | 1396405 | Sandwich War Memorial More images | Q26675193 |
| 3 Gas Lamps Approximately 80, 180 and 280 Metres From New Street | II | Mill Wall | | | 23 April 1976 | TR3321357845; 51°16′19″N 1°20′31″E | | 1343794 | Upload Photo | Q26627566 |
| 7 Bollards at Junction of Mill Wall and Sandown Road | II | Mill Wall | | | 23 April 1976 | TR3346058043; 51°16′25″N 1°20′45″E | | 1069609 | Upload Photo | Q26322748 |
| Railing Upon the Bridge at Entrance to Mill Wall | II | Mill Wall | | | 23 April 1976 | TR3313557833; 51°16′19″N 1°20′27″E | | 1069608 | Upload Photo | Q26322746 |
| Walling and Bridge of the Delf Stream at the Entrance to the Mill Wall | II | Mill Wall | | | 19 May 1950 | TR3313457830; 51°16′19″N 1°20′27″E | | 1343793 | Upload Photo | Q26627565 |
| 1, Mill Wall Place | II | 1, Mill Wall Place | | | 23 April 1976 | TR3318257959; 51°16′23″N 1°20′30″E | | 1069610 | Upload Photo | Q26322750 |
| 9 and 11, Mill Wall Place | II | 9 and 11, Mill Wall Place | | | 23 April 1976 | TR3319557918; 51°16′22″N 1°20′31″E | | 1069611 | Upload Photo | Q26322752 |
| 10, Mill Wall Place | II | 10, Mill Wall Place | | | 23 April 1976 | TR3318057911; 51°16′21″N 1°20′30″E | | 1069613 | Upload Photo | Q26322754 |
| Rear Boundary Walling of No 11 | II | 11, Mill Wall Place | | | 23 April 1976 | TR3323257928; 51°16′22″N 1°20′33″E | | 1343756 | Upload Photo | Q26627531 |
| 12 and 14, Mill Wall Place | II | 12 and 14, Mill Wall Place | | | 23 April 1976 | TR3318257905; 51°16′21″N 1°20′30″E | | 1106353 | Upload Photo | Q26400222 |
| 15, Mill Wall Place | II* | 15, Mill Wall Place | | | 23 April 1976 | TR3320057908; 51°16′21″N 1°20′31″E | | 1069612 | Upload Photo | Q17557524 |
| Outbuilding at Rear of No 15 | II | 15, Mill Wall Place | | | 23 April 1976 | TR3322657906; 51°16′21″N 1°20′32″E | | 1325936 | Upload Photo | Q26611454 |
| 16 and 18, Mill Wall Place | II | 16 and 18, Mill Wall Place | | | 19 May 1950 | TR3318757894; 51°16′21″N 1°20′30″E | | 1069614 | Upload Photo | Q26322756 |
| 17, Mill Wall Place | II* | 17, Mill Wall Place | | | 29 April 1970 | TR3320657892; 51°16′21″N 1°20′31″E | | 1343757 | Upload Photo | Q17557863 |
| 20-30, Mill Wall Place | II | 20-30, Mill Wall Place | | | 23 April 1976 | TR3319457874; 51°16′20″N 1°20′31″E | | 1106361 | Upload Photo | Q26400230 |
| 32, Mill Wall Place | II | 32, Mill Wall Place | | | 23 April 1976 | TR3320257853; 51°16′19″N 1°20′31″E | | 1343758 | Upload Photo | Q26627532 |
| Outbuilding Between No 1 and Barnesend Court | II | Mill Wall Place | | | 23 April 1976 | TR3318457949; 51°16′23″N 1°20′30″E | | 1343755 | Upload Photo | Q26627530 |
| St Thomas' Hospital Almshouses | II | 1-11, Moat Sole | | | 23 April 1976 | TR3282558070; 51°16′27″N 1°20′12″E | | 1069619 | St Thomas' Hospital Almshouses More images | Q26322766 |
| 2, Moat Sole | II* | 2, Moat Sole | | | 29 April 1970 | TR3288658139; 51°16′29″N 1°20′15″E | | 1106323 | Upload Photo | Q17557727 |
| 4, Moat Sole | II | 4, Moat Sole | | | 23 April 1976 | TR3283658055; 51°16′27″N 1°20′13″E | | 1069624 | Upload Photo | Q26322777 |
| 6, Moat Sole | II | 6, Moat Sole | | | 23 April 1976 | TR3281558074; 51°16′27″N 1°20′12″E | | 1325951 | Upload Photo | Q26611468 |
| 10, Moat Sole | II | 10, Moat Sole | | | 23 April 1976 | TR3289558138; 51°16′29″N 1°20′16″E | | 1069616 | Upload Photo | Q26322760 |
| 11, Moat Sole | II | 11, Moat Sole | | | 23 April 1976 | TR3287758115; 51°16′28″N 1°20′15″E | | 1069622 | Upload Photo | Q26322772 |
| The Red Cow Public House | II | 12, Moat Sole | | | 23 April 1976 | TR3280158039; 51°16′26″N 1°20′11″E | | 1069620 | Upload Photo | Q26322768 |
| Doorway and Wall to South West of No 12 | II | 12, Moat Sole | | | 23 April 1976 | TR3287858132; 51°16′29″N 1°20′15″E | | 1069617 | Upload Photo | Q26322762 |
| 18 and 20, Moat Sole | II | 18 and 20, Moat Sole | | | 23 April 1976 | TR3291558128; 51°16′29″N 1°20′17″E | | 1106372 | Upload Photo | Q26400240 |
| 26, Moat Sole | II | 26, Moat Sole | | | 23 April 1976 | TR3285158119; 51°16′29″N 1°20′13″E | | 1106328 | Upload Photo | Q26400200 |
| Sunnycot | II | 31, Moat Sole | | | 23 April 1976 | TR3292558120; 51°16′29″N 1°20′17″E | | 1069615 | Upload Photo | Q26322758 |
| 33, Moat Sole | II | 33, Moat Sole | | | 23 April 1976 | TR3284258103; 51°16′28″N 1°20′13″E | | 1069618 | Upload Photo | Q26322764 |
| 35, Moat Sole | II | 35, Moat Sole | | | 23 April 1976 | TR3285158084; 51°16′27″N 1°20′13″E | | 1106305 | Upload Photo | Q26400181 |
| Oasthouse Outbuilding at the Rear of No 38 | II | 38, Moat Sole | | | 23 April 1976 | TR3283358038; 51°16′26″N 1°20′12″E | | 1325943 | Upload Photo | Q26611461 |
| 38, Moat Sole | II | 38, Moat Sole | | | 23 April 1976 | TR3282958018; 51°16′25″N 1°20′12″E | | 1343760 | Upload Photo | Q26627534 |
| 27 and 29, Moat Sole | II | 27 and 29, Moat Sole | | | 23 April 1976 | TR3290658133; 51°16′29″N 1°20′16″E | | 1343759 | Upload Photo | Q26627533 |
| Front Facade of Converted Chapel | II | Moat Sole | | | 23 April 1976 | TR3284258075; 51°16′27″N 1°20′13″E | | 1069623 | Upload Photo | Q26322775 |
| Gateway to St Thomas' Hospital | II | Moat Sole | | | 23 April 1976 | TR3281758037; 51°16′26″N 1°20′12″E | | 1069621 | Upload Photo | Q26322770 |
| Rear Boundary Walling of St Thomas' Hospital | II | Moat Sole | | | 23 April 1976 | TR3278658050; 51°16′26″N 1°20′10″E | | 1106299 | Upload Photo | Q26400177 |
| 13, New Street | II | 13, New Street | | | 23 April 1976 | TR3303158105; 51°16′28″N 1°20′23″E | | 1107208 | Upload Photo | Q26401019 |
| 14, New Street | II | 14, New Street | | | 29 April 1970 | TR3301558099; 51°16′28″N 1°20′22″E | | 1069585 | 14, New Street More images | Q26322702 |
| 15, New Street | II | 15, New Street | | | 23 April 1976 | TR3303458100; 51°16′28″N 1°20′23″E | | 1069625 | Upload Photo | Q26322779 |
| 16 and 18, New Street | II | 16 and 18, New Street | | | 19 May 1950 | TR3301958093; 51°16′28″N 1°20′22″E | | 1343783 | 16 and 18, New Street More images | Q26627556 |
| 17, New Street | II | 17, New Street | | | 23 April 1976 | TR3304158095; 51°16′28″N 1°20′23″E | | 1069626 | Upload Photo | Q26322781 |
| 19 and 21, New Street | II | 19 and 21, New Street | | | 23 April 1976 | TR3304658086; 51°16′27″N 1°20′23″E | | 1107219 | Upload Photo | Q26401030 |
| 20 and 22, New Street | II | 20 and 22, New Street | | | 23 April 1976 | TR3302358086; 51°16′27″N 1°20′22″E | | 1069586 | 20 and 22, New Street More images | Q26322705 |
| Newgate Cottage | II | 24, New Street | | | 23 April 1976 | TR3302958078; 51°16′27″N 1°20′23″E | | 1343784 | Upload Photo | Q26627557 |
| 26, New Street | II | 26, New Street | | | 23 April 1976 | TR3303358074; 51°16′27″N 1°20′23″E | | 1069587 | Upload Photo | Q26322707 |
| 29, New Street | II | 29, New Street | | | 23 April 1976 | TR3307158065; 51°16′27″N 1°20′25″E | | 1343761 | Upload Photo | Q26627535 |
| Boundary Walling (Site of Nos 33-37 New Street) | II | 33-37, New Street | | | 23 April 1976 | TR3308458053; 51°16′26″N 1°20′25″E | | 1069627 | Upload Photo | Q26322783 |
| White Friars | II | 34, New Street | | | 19 May 1950 | TR3305958049; 51°16′26″N 1°20′24″E | | 1069588 | Upload Photo | Q26322709 |
| 36, New Street | II | 36, New Street | | | 23 April 1976 | TR3306958041; 51°16′26″N 1°20′25″E | | 1343785 | Upload Photo | Q26627558 |
| Rose Cottage | II | 38, New Street | | | 23 April 1976 | TR3306158026; 51°16′25″N 1°20′24″E | | 1069589 | Upload Photo | Q26322711 |
| 46 and 48, New Street | II | 46 and 48, New Street | | | 23 April 1976 | TR3308958008; 51°16′25″N 1°20′25″E | | 1323131 | Upload Photo | Q26608883 |
| Rutupiae | II | 47, New Street | | | 19 May 1950 | TR3310758011; 51°16′25″N 1°20′26″E | | 1343780 | Upload Photo | Q26627553 |
| 49 and 51, New Street | II | 49 and 51, New Street | | | 23 April 1976 | TR3312357981; 51°16′24″N 1°20′27″E | | 1069582 | Upload Photo | Q26322697 |
| No 52 Including the Outhouse to North | II* | 52, New Street | | | 19 May 1950 | TR3309757990; 51°16′24″N 1°20′26″E | | 1343786 | Upload Photo | Q17557872 |
| Sackville House | II | 53, New Street | | | 29 April 1970 | TR3312957955; 51°16′23″N 1°20′27″E | | 1343781 | Upload Photo | Q26627554 |
| 54, New Street | II | 54, New Street | | | 23 April 1976 | TR3310057984; 51°16′24″N 1°20′26″E | | 1069590 | Upload Photo | Q26322713 |
| The Limes | II | 57, New Street | | | 23 April 1976 | TR3315257874; 51°16′20″N 1°20′28″E | | 1069583 | Upload Photo | Q26322699 |
| 60, New Street | II | 60, New Street | | | 8 February 1983 | TR3310957963; 51°16′23″N 1°20′26″E | | 1249730 | Upload Photo | Q26541837 |
| 62 and 64, New Street | II | 62 and 64, New Street | | | 23 April 1976 | TR3311257954; 51°16′23″N 1°20′27″E | | 1323133 | Upload Photo | Q26608885 |
| 68, New Street | II | 68, New Street | | | 23 April 1976 | TR3311857935; 51°16′22″N 1°20′27″E | | 1343787 | Upload Photo | Q26627559 |
| 70 and 72, New Street | II | 70 and 72, New Street | | | 23 April 1976 | TR3312257922; 51°16′22″N 1°20′27″E | | 1120882 | Upload Photo | Q26414083 |
| St Oswalds | II | 74, New Street | | | 23 April 1976 | TR3312557911; 51°16′21″N 1°20′27″E | | 1069591 | Upload Photo | Q26322715 |
| 86, New Street | II | 86, New Street | | | 23 April 1976 | TR3311857842; 51°16′19″N 1°20′27″E | | 1069592 | Upload Photo | Q26322718 |
| 61 Bollards From St Georges Road to Galliard Street | II | New Street | | | 23 April 1976 | TR3313457854; 51°16′20″N 1°20′27″E | | 1069584 | Upload Photo | Q26322700 |
| Boundary Walling to North of No 57 (The Limes) | II | New Street | | | 23 April 1976 | TR3315857894; 51°16′21″N 1°20′29″E | | 1343782 | Upload Photo | Q26627555 |
| K6 Telephone Kiosk | II | New Street | | | 20 February 1989 | TR3297158183; 51°16′30″N 1°20′20″E | | 1263600 | Upload Photo | Q26554379 |
| 1 and 3, Paradise Row | II | 1 and 3, Paradise Row | | | 23 April 1976 | TR3279658382; 51°16′37″N 1°20′11″E | | 1343788 | Upload Photo | Q26627560 |
| East, South and West Boundary Walling of Nos 1 and 3 | II | 1 and 3, Paradise Row | | | 23 April 1976 | TR3278458361; 51°16′37″N 1°20′11″E | | 1069593 | Upload Photo | Q26322720 |
| Centuries | II | 5 and 7, Paradise Row | | | 23 April 1976 | TR3278158398; 51°16′38″N 1°20′11″E | | 1323138 | Upload Photo | Q26608890 |
| Manwood Cottage | II | 23, Paradise Row | | | 23 April 1976 | TR3278558464; 51°16′40″N 1°20′11″E | | 1343789 | Upload Photo | Q26627561 |
| South West Boundary Walling of No 23 | II | 23, Paradise Row | | | 23 April 1976 | TR3276458451; 51°16′39″N 1°20′10″E | | 1323162 | Upload Photo | Q26608913 |
| 27, Paradise Row | II | 27, Paradise Row | | | 23 April 1976 | TR3280158450; 51°16′39″N 1°20′12″E | | 1069595 | Upload Photo | Q26322724 |
| 29-39, Paradise Row | II | 29-39, Paradise Row | | | 23 April 1976 | TR3280858464; 51°16′40″N 1°20′12″E | | 1323126 | Upload Photo | Q26608878 |
| Boundary Walling to the Primary School | II | Paradise Row | | | 23 April 1976 | TR3279858425; 51°16′39″N 1°20′11″E | | 1120890 | Upload Photo | Q26414090 |
| Gas Lamp Mounted on Brick Pier at Entrance to No 23 | II | Paradise Row | | | 23 April 1976 | TR3280058443; 51°16′39″N 1°20′12″E | | 1069594 | Upload Photo | Q26322722 |
| 1, Potter Street | II* | 1, Potter Street | | | 19 May 1950 | TR3304958262; 51°16′33″N 1°20′24″E | | 1069596 | 1, Potter Street More images | Q17557518 |
| 2 and 4, Potter Street | II | 2 and 4, Potter Street | | | 23 April 1976 | TR3306258259; 51°16′33″N 1°20′25″E | | 1069598 | 2 and 4, Potter Street | Q26322728 |
| 3 and 5, Potter Street | II | 3 and 5, Potter Street | | | 29 April 1970 | TR3305858273; 51°16′33″N 1°20′24″E | | 1120874 | 3 and 5, Potter Street More images | Q26414077 |
| 7, Potter Street | II | 7, Potter Street | | | 19 May 1950 | TR3306458285; 51°16′34″N 1°20′25″E | | 1069597 | 7, Potter Street More images | Q26322726 |
| 8 and 10, Potter Street | II | 8 and 10, Potter Street | | | 23 April 1976 | TR3307058274; 51°16′33″N 1°20′25″E | | 1120837 | 8 and 10, Potter Street More images | Q26414043 |
| 12, Potter Street | II | 12, Potter Street | | | 23 April 1976 | TR3307458281; 51°16′34″N 1°20′25″E | | 1069599 | 12, Potter Street More images | Q26322730 |
| 20 Bollards at Junction of the Rope Walk and Woodnesborough Road | II | Rope Walk | | | 23 April 1976 | TR3279558000; 51°16′25″N 1°20′10″E | | 1343811 | Upload Photo | Q26627583 |
| 3 Gas Lamps Approximately 85, 165 and 215 Metres From New Street | II | Rope Walk | | | 23 April 1976 | TR3306257858; 51°16′20″N 1°20′24″E | | 1343812 | Upload Photo | Q26627584 |
| 7 Bollards at Junction of Rope Walk With New Street | II | Rope Walk | | | 23 April 1976 | TR3312157832; 51°16′19″N 1°20′27″E | | 1069562 | Upload Photo | Q26322662 |
| Boundary Walling Midway Along the Rope Walk Between Woodnesborough Road and New Street | II | Rope Walk | | | 19 May 1950 | TR3295557915; 51°16′22″N 1°20′18″E | | 1069561 | Upload Photo | Q26322659 |
| Bridge (Site of the Sandown Gate) | II* | Sandown Road | | | 23 April 1976 | TR3347258038; 51°16′25″N 1°20′45″E | | 1122658 | Bridge (Site of the Sandown Gate) More images | Q17557742 |
| Downs Court Farmhouse | II | Sandown Road | | | 19 May 1950 | TR3369258017; 51°16′24″N 1°20′57″E | | 1069570 | Upload Photo | Q26322676 |
| Boundary Walls to Rear of Nos 1 to 11 Church Street St Mary's (Site of Hermitage) | II | School Road | | | 23 April 1976 | TR3280758377; 51°16′37″N 1°20′12″E | | 1343778 | Upload Photo | Q26627551 |
| Wall on North and East Side of School Road | II | School Road | | | 23 April 1976 | TR3287958396; 51°16′38″N 1°20′16″E | | 1122663 | Upload Photo | Q26415780 |
| 1, St Bartholomews | II | 1, St Bartholomews | | | 23 April 1976 | TR3309957505; 51°16′08″N 1°20′25″E | | 1069715 | Upload Photo | Q26322944 |
| 2 and 3, St Bartholomews | II | 2 and 3, St Bartholomews | | | 23 April 1976 | TR3306757500; 51°16′08″N 1°20′23″E | | 1087107 | Upload Photo | Q26379580 |
| 6, St Bartholomews | II | 6, St Bartholomews | | | 23 April 1976 | TR3304157452; 51°16′07″N 1°20′22″E | | 1069717 | Upload Photo | Q26322948 |
| 8, St Bartholomews | II | 8, St Bartholomews | | | 23 April 1976 | TR3302357446; 51°16′07″N 1°20′21″E | | 1335837 | Upload Photo | Q26684989 |
| 11, St Bartholomews | II | 11, St Bartholomews | | | 23 April 1976 | TR3303157486; 51°16′08″N 1°20′21″E | | 1343724 | Upload Photo | Q26893580 |
| 12, St Bartholomews | II | 12, St Bartholomews | | | 23 April 1976 | TR3302457489; 51°16′08″N 1°20′21″E | | 1069673 | Upload Photo | Q26322866 |
| 3, 5, 9 and 11, St Peter's Street | II | 3, 5, 9 and 11, St Peter's Street | | | 19 May 1950 | TR3310858115; 51°16′28″N 1°20′27″E | | 1069563 | 3, 5, 9 and 11, St Peter's Street More images | Q26322664 |
| 10 and 12, St Peter's Street | II | 10 and 12, St Peter's Street | | | 19 May 1950 | TR3312658101; 51°16′28″N 1°20′28″E | | 1069566 | 10 and 12, St Peter's Street More images | Q26322670 |
| 16, St Peter's Street | II | 16, St Peter's Street | | | 19 May 1950 | TR3312358115; 51°16′28″N 1°20′27″E | | 1322787 | 16, St Peter's Street More images | Q26608573 |
| 18, St Peter's Street | II | 18, St Peter's Street | | | 19 May 1950 | TR3312158121; 51°16′28″N 1°20′27″E | | 1343775 | 18, St Peter's Street More images | Q26627548 |
| 20 and 22, St Peter's Street | II | 20 and 22, St Peter's Street | | | 29 April 1970 | TR3311758130; 51°16′29″N 1°20′27″E | | 1322789 | 20 and 22, St Peter's Street More images | Q26608575 |
| Curfew House | II* | 28, St Peter's Street | | | 19 May 1950 | TR3311158148; 51°16′29″N 1°20′27″E | | 1069567 | Curfew House More images | Q17557507 |
| 30 and 30A, St Peter's Street | II | 30 and 30A, St Peter's Street | | | 23 April 1976 | TR3311458157; 51°16′29″N 1°20′27″E | | 1343776 | 30 and 30A, St Peter's Street More images | Q26627549 |
| Outbuilding to Rear of No 32 | II | 32, St Peter's Street | | | 23 April 1976 | TR3312458167; 51°16′30″N 1°20′28″E | | 1069568 | Upload Photo | Q26322672 |
| 32, St Peter's Street | II | 32, St Peter's Street | | | 19 May 1950 | TR3310358171; 51°16′30″N 1°20′27″E | | 1121529 | 32, St Peter's Street More images | Q26414694 |
| Hadley House | II | 34, St Peter's Street | | | 19 May 1950 | TR3310058182; 51°16′30″N 1°20′26″E | | 1069569 | Hadley House More images | Q26322674 |
| Seven Post House | II | 36, St Peter's Street | | | 19 May 1950 | TR3309758194; 51°16′31″N 1°20′26″E | | 1343777 | Seven Post House More images | Q26627550 |
| 50, St Peter's Street | II | 50, St Peter's Street | | | 19 June 1991 | TR3309358252; 51°16′33″N 1°20′26″E | | 1069518 | 50, St Peter's Street More images | Q26322584 |
| 2 Bollards Opposite Seven Post Alley | II | St Peter's Street | | | 23 April 1976 | TR3308958188; 51°16′30″N 1°20′26″E | | 1069565 | Upload Photo | Q26322668 |
| 2 Bollards Seven Post Alley | II | St Peter's Street | | | 23 April 1976 | TR3309558187; 51°16′30″N 1°20′26″E | | 1121535 | Upload Photo | Q26414700 |
| 3 Bollards Opposite No 30 | II | St Peter's Street | | | 23 April 1976 | TR3309858154; 51°16′29″N 1°20′26″E | | 1343814 | Upload Photo | Q26627585 |
| Church of St Peter | I | St Peter's Street | | | 19 May 1950 | TR3307458165; 51°16′30″N 1°20′25″E | Central tower fell in 1661, destroying the S aisle, C13 strucutre sufficiently intact, C14 monuments in N aisle, monument of Sir John Grove mid-C14 knight (transferred from S aisle) | 1343813 | Church of St Peter More images | Q7595282 |
| St Peter's Churchyard Walls | II | St Peter's Street | | | 23 April 1976 | TR3308158186; 51°16′30″N 1°20′25″E | | 1069564 | Upload Photo | Q26322666 |
| Chapel of St Bartholomew | I | Stone Cross | | | 19 May 1950 | TR3304057506; 51°16′09″N 1°20′22″E | Built soon after 1217, flint with Caen dressings, Purbeck marble effigy of a knight c. 1250-60 | 1343722 | Chapel of St Bartholomew More images | Q17529774 |
| Three Kings Yard | II | 1-5, Strand Street | | | 23 April 1976 | TR3312858217; 51°16′31″N 1°20′28″E | | 1122672 | Three Kings Yard More images | Q26415789 |
| 3-7, Strand Street | II | 3-7, Strand Street | | | 29 April 1970 | TR3314758237; 51°16′32″N 1°20′29″E | | 1069571 | 3-7, Strand Street More images | Q26322678 |
| Iron railings at Three Kings | II | 9, Strand Street | | | 23 April 1976 | TR3313758247; 51°16′32″N 1°20′28″E | | 1122635 | Upload Photo | Q26415756 |
| Pump at North East corner of Former Three Kings Public House | II | 9, Strand Street | | | 23 April 1976 | TR3313958244; 51°16′32″N 1°20′29″E | | 1069572 | Upload Photo | Q26322680 |
| Three Kings | II | 9, Strand Street | | | 29 April 1970 | TR3313358236; 51°16′32″N 1°20′28″E | | 1343779 | Three Kings More images | Q26627552 |
| Chapel Remains Behind No 11 | II | 11, Strand Street | | | 19 May 1950 | TR3312458235; 51°16′32″N 1°20′28″E | | 1069573 | Chapel Remains Behind No 11 More images | Q26322682 |
| 10, Strand Street | II | 10, Strand Street | | | 20 June 1988 | TR3313658262; 51°16′33″N 1°20′28″E | | 1343831 | 10, Strand Street More images | Q26627600 |
| 11, 11A, 13, 15 and 15A, Strand Street | II* | 11, 11A, 13, 15 and 15A, Strand Street | | | 19 May 1950 | TR3312258251; 51°16′32″N 1°20′28″E | | 1069574 | 11, 11A, 13, 15 and 15A, Strand Street More images | Q17557510 |
| 19 TO 23, Strand Street | II | 19 TO 23, Strand Street | | | 19 May 1950 | TR3310658264; 51°16′33″N 1°20′27″E | | 1338210 | 19 TO 23, Strand Street More images | Q26622556 |
| 22, Strand Street | II | 22, Strand Street | | | 23 April 1976 | TR3310058291; 51°16′34″N 1°20′27″E | | 1121989 | 22, Strand Street More images | Q26415121 |
| 25, Strand Street | II | 25, Strand Street | | | 19 May 1950 | TR3309758278; 51°16′33″N 1°20′27″E | | 1069575 | 25, Strand Street More images | Q26322684 |
| 27, Strand Street | II* | 27, Strand Street | | | 19 May 1950 | TR3309158282; 51°16′34″N 1°20′26″E | | 1069576 | 27, Strand Street More images | Q17557514 |
| 29 and 31, Strand Street | II | 29 and 31, Strand Street | | | 23 April 1976 | TR3308258287; 51°16′34″N 1°20′26″E | | 1122645 | 29 and 31, Strand Street More images | Q26415766 |
| 30, Strand Street | II | 30, Strand Street | | | 19 May 1950 | TR3307458318; 51°16′35″N 1°20′25″E | | 1069547 | Upload Photo | Q26322630 |
| 32 and 34, Strand Street | II | 32 and 34, Strand Street | | | 23 April 1976 | TR3306958324; 51°16′35″N 1°20′25″E | | 1121991 | Upload Photo | Q26415123 |
| 33, Strand Street | II | 33, Strand Street | | | 19 May 1950 | TR3307258300; 51°16′34″N 1°20′25″E | | 1069577 | 33, Strand Street More images | Q26322686 |
| 35, Strand Street | II | 35, Strand Street | | | 29 April 1970 | TR3306758308; 51°16′34″N 1°20′25″E | | 1122648 | Upload Photo | Q26415768 |
| Dolphin Cottage | II | 37, Strand Street | | | 23 April 1976 | TR3306158314; 51°16′35″N 1°20′25″E | | 1069578 | Upload Photo | Q26322688 |
| Harfleet House and Dragon Hall House | II | 41, Strand Street | | | 19 May 1950 | TR3305258324; 51°16′35″N 1°20′24″E | | 1069579 | Harfleet House and Dragon Hall House More images | Q26322690 |
| 42, Strand Street | II | 42, Strand Street | | | 24 July 1985 | TR3303258355; 51°16′36″N 1°20′23″E | | 1069517 | Upload Photo | Q26322582 |
| 43 and 45, Strand Street | II | 43 and 45, Strand Street | | | 19 May 1950 | TR3303958327; 51°16′35″N 1°20′24″E | | 1122622 | 43 and 45, Strand Street More images | Q26415744 |
| The Old Kings House | II | 46, Strand Street | | | 19 May 1950 | TR3300058401; 51°16′37″N 1°20′22″E | | 1069549 | The Old Kings House More images | Q26322634 |
| 47, Strand Street | II | 47, Strand Street | | | 23 April 1976 | TR3302858341; 51°16′36″N 1°20′23″E | | 1069580 | 47, Strand Street More images | Q26322692 |
| Boundary Walling at No 47 | II | 47, Strand Street | | | 23 April 1976 | TR3299458385; 51°16′37″N 1°20′21″E | | 1069539 | Upload Photo | Q26322620 |
| 49, Strand Street | II | 49, Strand Street | | | 23 April 1976 | TR3302458345; 51°16′36″N 1°20′23″E | | 1069581 | 49, Strand Street More images | Q26322694 |
| 51 and 53, Strand Street | II | 51 and 53, Strand Street | | | 19 May 1950 | TR3301658354; 51°16′36″N 1°20′23″E | | 1069537 | 51 and 53, Strand Street More images | Q26322616 |
| 55, Strand Street | II | 55, Strand Street | | | 19 May 1950 | TR3300958363; 51°16′36″N 1°20′22″E | | 1069538 | 55, Strand Street More images | Q26322618 |
| River House | II | 57, Strand Street | | | 19 May 1950 | TR3300358370; 51°16′36″N 1°20′22″E | | 1343800 | River House More images | Q26627572 |
| Bowling Corner | II | 59, Strand Street | | | 23 April 1976 | TR3298558390; 51°16′37″N 1°20′21″E | | 1343801 | Bowling Corner More images | Q26627573 |
| Boundary Walling to West Side of No 59 | II | 59, Strand Street | | | 23 April 1976 | TR3297858403; 51°16′38″N 1°20′21″E | | 1069540 | Boundary Walling to West Side of No 59 More images | Q26322622 |
| The Long House | II* | 62, Strand Street | | | 19 May 1950 | TR3287958488; 51°16′40″N 1°20′16″E | | 1069550 | The Long House More images | Q26322637 |
| Giles Quay | II | 64A, Strand Street | | | 19 May 1950 | TR3298858419; 51°16′38″N 1°20′21″E | | 1338553 | Giles Quay More images | Q26622868 |
| Invicta House Ye Olde King's Arms | II* | 65, Strand Street | | | 19 May 1950 | TR3292658438; 51°16′39″N 1°20′18″E | | 1069542 | Invicta House Ye Olde King's Arms More images | Q17557500 |
| 67 and 69, Strand Street | II | 67 and 69, Strand Street | | | 23 April 1976 | TR3291858444; 51°16′39″N 1°20′18″E | | 1343803 | 67 and 69, Strand Street More images | Q26627575 |
| St Cuthberts | II | 68, Strand Street | | | 23 April 1976 | TR3284058512; 51°16′41″N 1°20′14″E | | 1069551 | St Cuthberts More images | Q26322639 |
| 71, Strand Street | II | 71, Strand Street | | | 23 April 1976 | TR3290858444; 51°16′39″N 1°20′17″E | | 1069543 | 71, Strand Street More images | Q26322624 |
| Creighton House | II | 75, Strand Street | | | 29 April 1970 | TR3288458461; 51°16′40″N 1°20′16″E | | 1343804 | Creighton House More images | Q26627576 |
| 77, Strand Street | II | 77, Strand Street | | | 23 April 1976 | TR3285658483; 51°16′40″N 1°20′15″E | | 1069544 | 77, Strand Street More images | Q26322626 |
| Unity Cottages | II | 79-85, Strand Street | | | 4 February 1998 | TR3284658489; 51°16′41″N 1°20′14″E | | 1376765 | Unity Cottages More images | Q26657288 |
| Gazen House | II | 80A, Strand Street | | | 23 April 1976 | TR3280258539; 51°16′42″N 1°20′12″E | | 1343809 | Gazen House More images | Q26627581 |
| 82, Strand Street | II | 82, Strand Street | | | 23 April 1976 | TR3278858545; 51°16′42″N 1°20′11″E | | 1121969 | 82, Strand Street More images | Q26415104 |
| 87, Strand Street | II | 87, Strand Street | | | 23 April 1976 | TR3283658494; 51°16′41″N 1°20′14″E | | 1069545 | 87, Strand Street More images | Q26322628 |
| 89, Strand Street | II | 89, Strand Street | | | 23 April 1976 | TR3281558507; 51°16′41″N 1°20′13″E | | 1343805 | 89, Strand Street More images | Q26627577 |
| Manwood Close, Manwood Court | II* | 91 and 93, Strand Street | | | 19 May 1950 | TR3276858519; 51°16′42″N 1°20′10″E | Originally Sir Roger Manwood's Grammar School, now 2 private houses. | 1069546 | Manwood Close, Manwood Court More images | Q17557503 |
| 3 Bollards at Entrance to Dolphin Quay From Strand Street | II | Strand Street | | | 23 April 1976 | TR3306258326; 51°16′35″N 1°20′25″E | | 1121959 | Upload Photo | Q26415095 |
| Boundary Walling at the Rear of No 87 on the East Side of Paradise Row | II | Strand Street | | | 23 April 1976 | TR3282658480; 51°16′40″N 1°20′13″E | | 1121983 | Upload Photo | Q26415115 |
| Boundary Walling Between No 82 and Gallows Field | II | Strand Street | | | 23 April 1976 | TR3271658538; 51°16′42″N 1°20′07″E | | 1069552 | Upload Photo | Q26322641 |
| Boundary Walling to the Rear of No 89, Bordering Paradise Row | II | Strand Street | | | 23 April 1976 | TR3282258483; 51°16′40″N 1°20′13″E | | 1121985 | Upload Photo | Q26415117 |
| Church of St Mary | I | Strand Street | | | 19 May 1950 | TR3295158417; 51°16′38″N 1°20′19″E | central tower fell in 1668 destroying the interior, walls of C12 Caen ashlar, barnlike interior with kingpost roof of c. 1670, font octagonal 1662, reredos 1756 | 1069541 | Church of St Mary More images | Q2324027 |
| Doorway and Arch in Boundary Walling | II | Strand Street | | | 19 May 1950 | TR3300658382; 51°16′37″N 1°20′22″E | | 1343808 | Doorway and Arch in Boundary Walling More images | Q26627580 |
| Front Boundary Walling of Hidden House | II | Strand Street | | | 23 April 1976 | TR3271758528; 51°16′42″N 1°20′08″E | | 1343806 | Upload Photo | Q26627578 |
| Gas Lamp on Dolphin Quay | II | Strand Street | | | 23 April 1976 | TR3308358348; 51°16′36″N 1°20′26″E | | 1343807 | Upload Photo | Q26627579 |
| St Mary's Churchyard Boundary Walling | II | Strand Street | | | 23 April 1976 | TR3294358391; 51°16′37″N 1°20′19″E | | 1343802 | St Mary's Churchyard Boundary Walling More images | Q26627574 |
| Walling of Dolphin Quay | II | Strand Street | | | 23 April 1976 | TR3309058345; 51°16′36″N 1°20′26″E | | 1069548 | Upload Photo | Q26322633 |
| Walling to Rear of Guestling Mill and No 62 Strand Street | II | Strand Street | | | 23 April 1976 | TR3289858498; 51°16′41″N 1°20′17″E | | 1121965 | Upload Photo | Q26415100 |
| 2 Bollards to East of Salutation Outhouses in the Bulwarks | II | The Bulwarks | | | 23 April 1976 | TR3337058154; 51°16′29″N 1°20′40″E | | 1343728 | Upload Photo | Q26627503 |
| 7 Bollards at Junction of Bulwarks and Sandown Road | II | The Bulwarks | | | 23 April 1976 | TR3346458047; 51°16′25″N 1°20′45″E | | 1069722 | Upload Photo | Q26322958 |
| Section of Walling Adjacent to the Sandown Bridge | II | The Bulwarks | | | 19 May 1950 | TR3347558061; 51°16′26″N 1°20′45″E | | 1343727 | Upload Photo | Q26627502 |
| Section of Walling Near Modern Small Pump Station | II | The Bulwarks | | | 19 May 1950 | TR3349458108; 51°16′27″N 1°20′47″E | | 1069723 | Upload Photo | Q26322960 |
| 1, The Butchery | II | 1, The Butchery | | | 23 April 1976 | TR3303458258; 51°16′33″N 1°20′23″E | | 1069724 | 1, The Butchery More images | Q26322963 |
| 3, The Butchery | II | 3, The Butchery | | | 19 May 1950 | TR3303358265; 51°16′33″N 1°20′23″E | | 1343729 | 3, The Butchery More images | Q26627504 |
| 5, The Butchery | II | 5, The Butchery | | | 23 April 1976 | TR3302958273; 51°16′33″N 1°20′23″E | | 1115147 | 5, The Butchery More images | Q26408894 |
| 9, The Butchery | II | 9, The Butchery | | | 23 April 1976 | TR3302658291; 51°16′34″N 1°20′23″E | | 1069725 | 9, The Butchery More images | Q26322965 |
| 13 and 15, The Butchery | II | 13 and 15, The Butchery | | | 23 April 1976 | TR3302458301; 51°16′34″N 1°20′23″E | | 1115151 | 13 and 15, The Butchery More images | Q26408898 |
| 1-3, The Butts | II | 1-3, The Butts | | | 23 April 1976 | TR3269358452; 51°16′40″N 1°20′06″E | | 1069726 | Upload Photo | Q26322967 |
| 1 Bollard at Junction of the Butts and Woodnesborough Road | II | The Butts | | | 23 April 1976 | TR3278458015; 51°16′25″N 1°20′10″E | | 1139041 | Upload Photo | Q26431995 |
| 8 Bollards to the South of Nos 1, 2 and 3 | II | The Butts | | | 23 April 1976 | TR3268658438; 51°16′39″N 1°20′06″E | | 1115121 | Upload Photo | Q26408871 |
| Bridge Over Stream at Woodnesborough Road | II | The Butts | | | 23 April 1976 | TR3277358006; 51°16′25″N 1°20′09″E | | 1069727 | Upload Photo | Q26322969 |
| Garden Wall to the South of No 3 | II | The Butts | | | 23 April 1976 | TR3270758445; 51°16′39″N 1°20′07″E | | 1343730 | Upload Photo | Q26627505 |
| 3, The Chain | II | 3, The Chain | | | 23 April 1976 | TR3319058010; 51°16′25″N 1°20′31″E | | 1343732 | Upload Photo | Q26627507 |
| 5, The Chain | II | 5, The Chain | | | 23 April 1976 | TR3319058006; 51°16′24″N 1°20′31″E | | 1329948 | Upload Photo | Q26615127 |
| 7 and 9, The Chain | II | 7 and 9, The Chain | | | 23 April 1976 | TR3319058000; 51°16′24″N 1°20′31″E | | 1069736 | 7 and 9, The Chain More images | Q26322985 |
| 13, The Chain | II | 13, The Chain | | | 23 April 1976 | TR3318857987; 51°16′24″N 1°20′31″E | | 1343733 | Upload Photo | Q26627508 |
| 15 and 17, The Chain | II | 15 and 17, The Chain | | | 23 April 1976 | TR3318657981; 51°16′24″N 1°20′30″E | | 1139008 | Upload Photo | Q26431969 |
| 19-23, The Chain | II | 19-23, The Chain | | | 23 April 1976 | TR3318457969; 51°16′23″N 1°20′30″E | | 1069737 | Upload Photo | Q26322987 |
| 8 Bollards to South East Side of Toll Bridge | II | The Quay | | | 23 April 1976 | TR3320258261; 51°16′33″N 1°20′32″E | | 1069560 | Upload Photo | Q26322657 |
| 2 Bollards at East End of Car Park | II | The Quay | | | 23 April 1976 | TR3331758202; 51°16′31″N 1°20′38″E | | 1343790 | Upload Photo | Q26627562 |
| 3 Bollards to South West of Toll Bridge | II | The Quay | | | 23 April 1976 | TR3317958274; 51°16′33″N 1°20′31″E | | 1343810 | Upload Photo | Q26627582 |
| 7 Bollards Around Public Convenience | II | The Quay | | | 23 April 1976 | TR3325358234; 51°16′32″N 1°20′34″E | | 1069604 | Upload Photo | Q26322738 |
| Fisher Gate | I | The Quay | | | 29 April 1970 | TR3328258194; 51°16′30″N 1°20′36″E | | 1069601 | Fisher Gate More images | Q17529694 |
| Fishergate House | II | The Quay | | | 23 April 1976 | TR3328858189; 51°16′30″N 1°20′36″E | | 1069602 | Fishergate House More images | Q26322734 |
| Section of Town Wall Between Fishergate House and Bastion | II | The Quay | | | 23 April 1976 | TR3329958187; 51°16′30″N 1°20′37″E | | 1323148 | Section of Town Wall Between Fishergate House and Bastion More images | Q26608899 |
| Section of Town Wall Between Warehouse and Army Cadet Centre | II | The Quay | | | 23 April 1976 | TR3326358207; 51°16′31″N 1°20′35″E | | 1120826 | Upload Photo | Q26414032 |
| Section of Town Walling to East of Quay Cottage | II | The Quay | | | 23 April 1976 | TR3332058168; 51°16′29″N 1°20′38″E | | 1323149 | Section of Town Walling to East of Quay Cottage More images | Q26608900 |
| The Keep | II | The Quay | | | 23 April 1976 | TR3330558178; 51°16′30″N 1°20′37″E | | 1069603 | The Keep More images | Q26322736 |
| Warehouse (Gardeners) | II | The Quay | | | 23 April 1976 | TR3322958212; 51°16′31″N 1°20′33″E | | 1069600 | Warehouse (Gardeners) More images | Q26322732 |
| 2, UPPER STRand STREET, 11 and 13 , High Street | II | 2, Upper Strand Street, 11 and 13 , High Street | | | 23 April 1976 | TR3316658201; 51°16′31″N 1°20′30″E | | 1069667 | Upload Photo | Q26322855 |
| Barbican Players | II | 3, Upper Strand Street | | | 23 April 1976 | TR3320358198; 51°16′31″N 1°20′32″E | | 1338546 | Upload Photo | Q26622861 |
| Lea House | II | 4, Upper Strand Street | | | 19 May 1950 | TR3318358192; 51°16′30″N 1°20′31″E | | 1121973 | Upload Photo | Q26415108 |
| 5, Upper Strand Street | II | 5, Upper Strand Street | | | 23 April 1976 | TR3321158191; 51°16′30″N 1°20′32″E | | 1069558 | Upload Photo | Q26322653 |
| Melbourne House | II | 6, Upper Strand Street | | | 23 April 1976 | TR3318958186; 51°16′30″N 1°20′31″E | | 1069553 | Upload Photo | Q26322643 |
| 8 and 10, Upper Strand Street | II | 8 and 10, Upper Strand Street | | | 23 April 1976 | TR3320358176; 51°16′30″N 1°20′32″E | | 1069554 | Upload Photo | Q26322645 |
| 9, Upper Strand Street | II | 9, Upper Strand Street | | | 23 April 1976 | TR3323258178; 51°16′30″N 1°20′33″E | | 1069559 | Upload Photo | Q26322655 |
| 12, Upper Strand Street | II | 12, Upper Strand Street | | | 19 May 1950 | TR3321258170; 51°16′30″N 1°20′32″E | | 1338543 | Upload Photo | Q26622858 |
| 13 and 15, Upper Strand Street | II | 13 and 15, Upper Strand Street | | | 19 May 1950 | TR3324758168; 51°16′30″N 1°20′34″E | | 1069514 | Upload Photo | Q26322576 |
| 17, Upper Strand Street | II | 17, Upper Strand Street | | | 19 May 1950 | TR3325558161; 51°16′29″N 1°20′34″E | | 1121946 | 17, Upper Strand Street More images | Q26415085 |
| 19 and 21, Upper Strand Street | II | 19 and 21, Upper Strand Street | | | 19 May 1950 | TR3326658154; 51°16′29″N 1°20′35″E | | 1343829 | 19 and 21, Upper Strand Street More images | Q26627598 |
| 20-24, Upper Strand Street | II | 20-24, Upper Strand Street | | | 29 April 1970 | TR3326858136; 51°16′29″N 1°20′35″E | | 1069555 | 20-24, Upper Strand Street More images | Q26322647 |
| 23 and 25, Upper Strand Street | II | 23 and 25, Upper Strand Street | | | 23 April 1976 | TR3327458148; 51°16′29″N 1°20′35″E | | 1069515 | 23 and 25, Upper Strand Street | Q26322578 |
| 26, Upper Strand Street | II | 26, Upper Strand Street | | | 23 April 1976 | TR3327958130; 51°16′28″N 1°20′36″E | | 1121943 | 26, Upper Strand Street More images | Q26415083 |
| 28 and 30, Upper Strand Street | II | 28 and 30, Upper Strand Street | | | 23 April 1976 | TR3328458126; 51°16′28″N 1°20′36″E | | 1069556 | 28 and 30, Upper Strand Street More images | Q26322649 |
| 29-41, Upper Strand Street | II | 29-41, Upper Strand Street | | | 23 April 1976 | TR3330558131; 51°16′28″N 1°20′37″E | | 1121947 | 29-41, Upper Strand Street More images | Q26415086 |
| 32 and 34, Upper Strand Street | II | 32 and 34, Upper Strand Street | | | 19 May 1950 | TR3329258122; 51°16′28″N 1°20′36″E | | 1069557 | 32 and 34, Upper Strand Street More images | Q26322651 |
| 1 and 1A, Vicarage Lane | II | 1 and 1A, Vicarage Lane | | | 19 May 1950 | TR3290458332; 51°16′35″N 1°20′17″E | | 1343830 | 1 and 1A, Vicarage Lane More images | Q26627599 |
| 3 and 5, Vicarage Lane | II* | 3 and 5, Vicarage Lane | | | 19 May 1950 | TR3289458341; 51°16′36″N 1°20′16″E | | 1121958 | 3 and 5, Vicarage Lane More images | Q17557734 |
| 4, Vicarage Lane | II | 4, Vicarage Lane | | | 23 April 1976 | TR3292358334; 51°16′35″N 1°20′18″E | | 1069516 | 4, Vicarage Lane More images | Q26322580 |

== See also ==
- Grade I listed buildings in Kent
- Grade II* listed buildings in Kent

== Sources ==
- Newman, John (2013) [1969], Kent: North East And East, The Buildings of England, New Haven and London: Yale University Press, ISBN 978-0-300-18506-5
