= Listed buildings in Ash, Dover =

Civil Parish in Kent, England

Ash is a village and civil parish in the Dover District of Kent, England. It contains 105 listed buildings that are recorded in the National Heritage List for England. Of these two are grade I, four are grade II* and 99 are grade II.

This list is based on the information retrieved online from Historic England.

== Key ==
Grade	Criteria
I	Buildings that are of exceptional interest
II*	Particularly important buildings of more than special interest
II	Buildings that are of special interest

== Listing ==
Name	Grade	Location	Type	Completed (Note: The date given is the date used by Historic England as significant for the initial building or that of an important part in the structure's description.)	Date designated	Grid ref. (Note: The grid reference is based on the British national grid reference system, sometimes known as OSGB36, used by the Ordnance Survey.) Geo-coordinates	Notes	Entry number (Note: The "List Entry Number" is a unique number assigned to each listed building and scheduled monument by Historic England.)	Image	Wikidata
Barn About 40 Metres South of Goss Hall	II				26 November 1987	TR3007658704; 51°16′52″N 1°17′52″E		1051623	Upload Photo	Q26303472
Wingham Barton Manor	II*		manor house		10 November 1963	TR2738261205; 51°18′16″N 1°15′39″E		1070203	Wingham Barton Manor More images	Q17557676
Chequer Lodge	II	2, Chequer Lane			10 November 1963	TR2853558441; 51°16′45″N 1°16′32″E		1070232	Upload Photo	Q26323922
Mulberry House	II	Chequer Lane			11 October 1963	TR3096360493; 51°17′48″N 1°18′42″E		1070248	Upload Photo	Q26323948
The Chequer Inn	II	Chequer Lane	pub		13 October 1952	TR2855558452; 51°16′46″N 1°16′33″E		1052354	The Chequer Inn More images	Q26304141
Sedge's	II	Cooper Street			26 November 1987	TR3033959927; 51°17′31″N 1°18′08″E		1070249	Upload Photo	Q26323950
Upper Goldstone Farmhouse	II	Cop Street			11 October 1963	TR2914160234; 51°17′42″N 1°17′07″E		1372278	Upload Photo	Q26653407
East Street Farmhouse	II	East Street			26 November 1987	TR3051758832; 51°16′55″N 1°18′15″E		1363268	Upload Photo	Q26645104
1 and 2 Goldstone Court	II	1 and 2 Goldstone Court, Goldstone			11 October 1963	TR2906060595; 51°17′54″N 1°17′04″E		1052332	Upload Photo	Q26304120
The Poplars	II	Goldstone			11 October 1963	TR2934960930; 51°18′05″N 1°17′20″E		1070250	Upload Photo	Q26323952
1 and 2, Goodban Square	II	1 and 2, Goodban Square			26 November 1987	TR2871258463; 51°16′46″N 1°16′41″E		1372619	Upload Photo	Q26653718
Barn and Cowhouses About 50 Metres South East of Goss Hall	II	Goss Hall			26 November 1987	TR3012058701; 51°16′51″N 1°17′54″E		1070251	Upload Photo	Q26323954
Goss Hall	II	Goss Hall			11 October 1963	TR3007958760; 51°16′53″N 1°17′52″E		1363269	Upload Photo	Q26645105
Holly Tree Cottage and Numbers 1-3 Guilton Cottages	II	1-3 Guilton Cottages, Guilton			26 November 1987	TR2791858266; 51°16′41″N 1°16′00″E		1070252	Upload Photo	Q26323956
Granary About 5 Metres North East of School Farmhouse	II	Guilton			26 November 1987	TR2800358307; 51°16′42″N 1°16′04″E		1363270	Upload Photo	Q26645106
Guilton Farmhouse and Garden Wall	II	Guilton			11 October 1963	TR2798458274; 51°16′41″N 1°16′03″E		1372617	Upload Photo	Q26653716
Guilton House	II	Guilton			10 November 1963	TR2811458294; 51°16′41″N 1°16′10″E		1070253	Upload Photo	Q26323958
Guilton Rectory	II	Guilton			11 October 1963	TR2787058260; 51°16′40″N 1°15′57″E		1051601	Upload Photo	Q26303453
School Farm House	II*	Guilton			13 October 1952	TR2799458302; 51°16′42″N 1°16′04″E		1051629	Upload Photo	Q17557415
Guston Court	II	Guston			26 November 1987	TR3063660954; 51°18′03″N 1°18′26″E		1051611	Upload Photo	Q26303460
Stables About 5 Metres South West of Guston Court	II	Guston			26 November 1987	TR3062060950; 51°18′03″N 1°18′25″E		1363231	Upload Photo	Q26645067
Cherry Thatch	II	Hoaden			11 October 1963	TR2695659864; 51°17′34″N 1°15′14″E		1372271	Upload Photo	Q26653400
Hoaden Farmhouse	II	Hoaden			26 November 1987	TR2691759918; 51°17′35″N 1°15′12″E		1070254	Upload Photo	Q26323960
Sheerwater Farmhouse	II	Hoaden			26 November 1987	TR2681260711; 51°18′01″N 1°15′08″E		1363232	Upload Photo	Q26645068
Lovekey Cottage	II	Moat Lane			26 November 1987	TR2920458069; 51°16′32″N 1°17′05″E		1070214	Upload Photo	Q26323887
Moat Farmhouse	II	Moat Lane			13 October 1952	TR2884658225; 51°16′38″N 1°16′47″E		1052308	Upload Photo	Q26304095
Chequer Court	II	Molland Lane			13 October 1952	TR2820459054; 51°17′06″N 1°16′16″E		1070215	Upload Photo	Q26323889
Molland	II	Molland Lane			13 October 1952	TR2810858657; 51°16′53″N 1°16′10″E		1363251	Upload Photo	Q26645088
Barn About 60 Metres North of Nash Court	II	Nash			26 November 1987	TR2676659222; 51°17′13″N 1°15′02″E		1363252	Upload Photo	Q26645089
Little Nash Farmhouse	II	Nash			26 November 1987	TR2638858864; 51°17′02″N 1°14′42″E		1363253	Upload Photo	Q26645090
Nash Court	II	Nash	building		11 October 1963	TR2679159150; 51°17′11″N 1°15′04″E		1070216	Nash Court More images	Q26323891
Nash Farm House	II	Nash			26 November 1987	TR2658759056; 51°17′08″N 1°14′53″E		1070217	Upload Photo	Q26323893
Flint House Flint House Cottage	II	21, New Street			26 November 1987	TR2918058305; 51°16′40″N 1°17′05″E		1372275	Upload Photo	Q26653404
43, New Street	II	43, New Street			26 November 1987	TR2921958300; 51°16′40″N 1°17′07″E		1363254	Upload Photo	Q26645091
50, New Street	II	50, New Street			26 November 1987	TR2938058242; 51°16′38″N 1°17′15″E		1070218	Upload Photo	Q26323895
The Shrubbery	II	New Street			26 November 1987	TR2950258138; 51°16′34″N 1°17′21″E		1070219	Upload Photo	Q26323897
Padbrook	II	Paramour Street			11 October 1953	TR2891361106; 51°18′11″N 1°16′57″E		1372298	Upload Photo	Q26653427
Paramour Farm	II	Paramour Street			26 November 1987	TR2894061184; 51°18′13″N 1°16′59″E		1363255	Upload Photo	Q26645092
Paramour Grange	II*	Paramour Street			13 October 1952	TR2886161088; 51°18′10″N 1°16′55″E		1070220	Upload Photo	Q17557679
Wall to Chilton House, About 5 Metres South of Chilton Cottage	II	Pudding Lane			26 November 1987	TR2861258394; 51°16′44″N 1°16′36″E		1070221	Upload Photo	Q26323899
Chilton Cottage	II	Pudding Lane			26 November 1987	TR2861258415; 51°16′44″N 1°16′36″E		1052250	Upload Photo	Q26304045
Cottage to Rear of the Beauty Shop (10/72)	II	Pudding Lane			26 November 1987	TR2859758416; 51°16′44″N 1°16′35″E		1372322	Upload Photo	Q26653450
Castle Farm	II	Richborough			26 November 1987	TR3186760430; 51°17′45″N 1°19′28″E		1045868	Upload Photo	Q26297976
King's End Farmhouse	II	Richborough			13 October 1952	TR3184060512; 51°17′47″N 1°19′27″E		1070222	Upload Photo	Q26323901
Richborough Castle	I	Richborough	castrum		26 November 1987	TR3244360252; 51°17′38″N 1°19′57″E		1363256	Richborough Castle More images	Q1309736
Richborough Farm Richborough Farm Cottage	II	Richborough			26 November 1987	TR3172660597; 51°17′50″N 1°19′21″E		1045842	Upload Photo	Q26297951
Sandhills Farmhouse	II	Sandhills			26 November 1987	TR2989860558; 51°17′52″N 1°17′47″E		1070223	Upload Photo	Q26323903
Collar Maker's Hole	II	101, Sandwich Road			26 November 1987	TR2977658358; 51°16′41″N 1°17′36″E		1070225	Upload Photo	Q26323907
Brewery Cottage Brewery House First and Last Cottages	II	Sandwich Road			26 November 1987	TR2911658368; 51°16′42″N 1°17′02″E		1370063	Upload Photo	Q26651322
Streetend House and Garden Walls	II	Sandwich Road			11 October 1963	TR2909458362; 51°16′42″N 1°17′00″E		1070224	Upload Photo	Q26323905
Hills Downe	II	Saunders Lane			26 November 1987	TR2974457993; 51°16′29″N 1°17′33″E		1370028	Upload Photo	Q26651290
Shipyard Cottages	II	Shipyard			26 November 1987	TR2869358359; 51°16′42″N 1°16′40″E		1070226	Upload Photo	Q26323909
Pair of Headstones, About 1 Metre North of North Chancel of Church of St Nicholas	II	The Street			26 November 1987	TR2877158394; 51°16′43″N 1°16′44″E		1070198	Upload Photo	Q26323855
Chest Tomb for Tomlin Family, About 3 Metres East of North Porch of Church of St Nicholas	II	The Street			26 November 1987	TR2875958396; 51°16′44″N 1°16′43″E		1363282	Upload Photo	Q26645116
Chest Tomb for Wood Family, About 3 Metres South East of Chancel of Church of St Nicholas	II	The Street			26 November 1987	TR2878458373; 51°16′43″N 1°16′45″E		1363281	Upload Photo	Q26645115
Yeoman Cottage	II	7, The Street			13 July 1979	TR2842358396; 51°16′44″N 1°16′26″E		1363260	Upload Photo	Q26645096
Young's Cottage	II	18, The Street			11 October 1963	TR2861758438; 51°16′45″N 1°16′36″E		1367029	Upload Photo	Q26648564
The Pharmacy	II	22, The Street			26 November 1987	TR2859858442; 51°16′45″N 1°16′35″E		1054904	Upload Photo	Q26306551
Meadow View	II	24, The Street			11 October 1963	TR2860858440; 51°16′45″N 1°16′36″E		1363259	Upload Photo	Q26645095
Pump Cottage Yeoman Thatch	II	27, The Street			26 November 1987	TR2853258422; 51°16′45″N 1°16′32″E		1054881	Upload Photo	Q26306528
30 and 32, the Street	II	30 and 32, The Street			11 October 1963	TR2862858435; 51°16′45″N 1°16′37″E		1070231	Upload Photo	Q26323919
Group of Chest Tomb and 5 Headstones, About 30 Metres North West of Church of St Nicholas	II	The Street			26 November 1987	TR2872258400; 51°16′44″N 1°16′41″E		1367103	Upload Photo	Q26648632
34, the Street	II	34, The Street			26 November 1987	TR2864558431; 51°16′45″N 1°16′37″E		1054897	Upload Photo	Q26306544
36, the Street	II	36, The Street			26 November 1987	TR2865258429; 51°16′45″N 1°16′38″E		1070230	Upload Photo	Q26323917
Norfolk House	II	38, The Street			26 November 1987	TR2866958426; 51°16′45″N 1°16′39″E		1363258	Upload Photo	Q26645094
Turner House	II	40 and 42, The Street			26 November 1987	TR2869158424; 51°16′45″N 1°16′40″E		1054921	Upload Photo	Q26306567
41, the Street	II	41, The Street			11 October 1963	TR2861558421; 51°16′45″N 1°16′36″E		1070234	Upload Photo	Q26323926
Cairn	II	45, The Street			26 November 1987	TR2864658413; 51°16′44″N 1°16′37″E		1070193	Upload Photo	Q26323844
Spencer House	II	46, The Street			26 November 1987	TR2872858440; 51°16′45″N 1°16′42″E		1367035	Upload Photo	Q26648569
61 and 63, the Street	II	61 and 63, The Street			26 November 1987	TR2880658394; 51°16′43″N 1°16′46″E		1054786	Upload Photo	Q26306439
Nat West Bank	II	70, The Street			26 November 1987	TR2885658408; 51°16′44″N 1°16′48″E		1045803	Upload Photo	Q26297909
The Lion Cottage	II	75, The Street			26 November 1987	TR2882958388; 51°16′43″N 1°16′47″E		1363283	Upload Photo	Q26645117
Forge Cottage and Pearl Cottage	II	76 and 78, The Street			26 November 1987	TR2887558404; 51°16′44″N 1°16′49″E		1070228	Upload Photo	Q26323913
The Post Office	II	79, The Street			26 November 1987	TR2887558388; 51°16′43″N 1°16′49″E		1367094	Upload Photo	Q26648624
Diamond Cottage	II	80, The Street			26 November 1987	TR2888558402; 51°16′44″N 1°16′50″E		1370057	Upload Photo	Q26651317
The Mascot	II	81, The Street			26 November 1987	TR2888858385; 51°16′43″N 1°16′50″E		1070200	Upload Photo	Q26323858
87 and 89, the Street	II	87 and 89, The Street			26 November 1987	TR2891758378; 51°16′43″N 1°16′51″E		1054772	Upload Photo	Q26306426
Griffin Cottage	II	94, The Street			11 October 1987	TR2894958407; 51°16′44″N 1°16′53″E		1045794	Upload Photo	Q26297899
57a and 57b, the Street	II	57a and 57b, The Street			26 November 1987	TR2869858396; 51°16′44″N 1°16′40″E		1363279	Upload Photo	Q26645114
Cape House	II	The Street			26 November 1987	TR2851758435; 51°16′45″N 1°16′31″E		1054909	Upload Photo	Q26306555
Chest Tomb About 2 Metres North East of Church of St Nicholas	II	The Street			26 November 1987	TR2878158393; 51°16′43″N 1°16′44″E		1070197	Upload Photo	Q26323852
Chilton House	II*	The Street			11 October 1963	TR2862558409; 51°16′44″N 1°16′36″E		1054893	Upload Photo	Q17557436
Church of St Nicholas	I	The Street	church building		11 October 1963	TR2875958384; 51°16′43″N 1°16′43″E		1363280	Church of St Nicholas More images	Q17529782
Churchyard Wall and Gate Piers About 20 Metres North of Church of St Nicholas	II	The Street			26 November 1987	TR2876958403; 51°16′44″N 1°16′44″E		1070199	Upload Photo	Q26323856
Garden Wall About 10 Metres North of and Returned to Spencer House	II	The Street			26 November 1987	TR2872758420; 51°16′44″N 1°16′42″E		1070229	Upload Photo	Q26323915
Garden Wall and Gate About 5 Metres North of Chilton House	II	The Street			26 November 1987	TR2863358422; 51°16′45″N 1°16′37″E		1363261	Upload Photo	Q26645097
Good Fortune Take Away	II	The Street			11 October 1963	TR2858958423; 51°16′45″N 1°16′35″E		1070233	Upload Photo	Q26323924
Monument About 1 Metre South of Church of St Nicholas	II	The Street			26 November 1987	TR2874458377; 51°16′43″N 1°16′42″E		1070196	Upload Photo	Q26323850
Pair of Tomb Chests About 30 Metres South of South Transept of Church of St Nicholas	II	The Street			26 November 1987	TR2875258347; 51°16′42″N 1°16′43″E		1070195	Upload Photo	Q26323848
Ship House	II	59a, The Street			26 November 1987	TR2870958397; 51°16′44″N 1°16′41″E		1070194	Upload Photo	Q26323846
The Beauty Shop	II	The Street			11 October 1963	TR2859558424; 51°16′45″N 1°16′35″E		1054887	Upload Photo	Q26306535
The Lion Hotel	II	The Street			26 November 1987	TR2882258410; 51°16′44″N 1°16′47″E		1363257	Upload Photo	Q26645093
Vine Cottage Vine House	II	The Street			26 November 1987	TR2891558396; 51°16′43″N 1°16′51″E		1070227	Upload Photo	Q26323911
Great Weddington	II	Weddington			26 November 1987	TR2919159085; 51°17′05″N 1°17′07″E		1363284	Upload Photo	Q26645118
The Manor House	II	Weddington			11 October 1963	TR2975359505; 51°17′18″N 1°17′37″E		1054774	Upload Photo	Q26306428
Barn About 75 Metres North of Wingham Barton Manor	II	Westmarsh	thatched barn		26 November 1987	TR2738461303; 51°18′19″N 1°15′39″E		1055868	Barn About 75 Metres North of Wingham Barton Manor More images	Q26307487
Cock's Farmhouse	II	Westmarsh			26 November 1987	TR2771261376; 51°18′21″N 1°15′56″E		1366560	Upload Photo	Q26648149
Fairview Farmhouse	II	Westmarsh			26 November 1987	TR2768761403; 51°18′22″N 1°15′55″E		1055871	Upload Photo	Q26307490
Franklyn Cottage	II	Westmarsh			26 November 1987	TR2774461435; 51°18′23″N 1°15′58″E		1055876	Upload Photo	Q26307496
Granary About 30 Metres East of Uphousden Farmhouse	II	Westmarsh			26 November 1987	TR2737560973; 51°18′09″N 1°15′38″E		1070202	Upload Photo	Q26323862
Idle Dyke Cottage	II	Westmarsh			18 March 1976	TR2741761559; 51°18′28″N 1°15′41″E		1070204	Upload Photo	Q26323864
Outhouse 5 Metres North of Uphousden Farmhouse	II	Westmarsh			26 November 1987	TR2733661006; 51°18′10″N 1°15′36″E		1055864	Upload Photo	Q26307484
Prospect Farm House	II	Westmarsh			26 November 1987	TR2764461310; 51°18′19″N 1°15′52″E		1070205	Upload Photo	Q26323866
The Russet House	II	Westmarsh			26 November 1987	TR2773161410; 51°18′22″N 1°15′57″E		1070206	Upload Photo	Q26323869
Uphousden Farm House	II	Westmarsh			11 October 1963	TR2732660989; 51°18′09″N 1°15′35″E		1070201	Upload Photo	Q26323860

== See also ==
- Grade I listed buildings in Kent
- Grade II* listed buildings in Kent

== Sources ==
- Newman, John (2013) [1969], Kent: North-East and East, The Buildings of England, New Haven and London: Yale University Press, ISBN 978-0-300-18506-5
