= Listed buildings in Temple Ewell =

Civil Parish in Kent, England

Temple Ewell is a village and civil parish in the Dover District of Kent, England. It contains six listed buildings that are recorded in the National Heritage List for England. Of these one is grade II* and five are grade II.

This list is based on the information retrieved online from Historic England.

== Key ==
Grade	Criteria
I	Buildings that are of exceptional interest
II*	Particularly important buildings of more than special interest
II	Buildings that are of special interest

== Listing ==
Name	Grade	Location	Type	Completed (Note: The date given is the date used by Historic England as significant for the initial building or that of an important part in the structure's description.)	Date designated	Grid ref. (Note: The grid reference is based on the British national grid reference system, sometimes known as OSGB36, used by the Ordnance Survey.) Geo-coordinates	Notes	Entry number (Note: The "List Entry Number" is a unique number assigned to each listed building and scheduled monument by Historic England.)	Image	Wikidata
Bushy Ruff House and Terrace	II	Alkham Valley Road			10 March 1975	TR2828743744; 51°08′51″N 1°15′45″E		1065713	Upload Photo	Q26318758
Church of St Peter and St Paul	II*	Church Hill	church building		22 August 1966	TR2861844221; 51°09′06″N 1°16′04″E		1357572	Church of St Peter and St Paul More images	Q17557886
Row of 3 Headstones 20 Metres North of Church of St Peter and St Paul	II	Church Hill			23 April 1987	TR2862244248; 51°09′06″N 1°16′04″E		1070034	Upload Photo	Q26323553
Part of Wall and Gatepiers to Kearsney Abbey	II	Kearsney Abbey Grounds			17 December 1973	TR2868043787; 51°08′51″N 1°16′06″E		1343824	Upload Photo	Q26627593
Three Ornamental Pavilions on the Canal Pond, Kearsney Court	II	Kearsney Court, Alkham Road			11 May 2007	TR2855043733; 51°08′50″N 1°15′59″E		1391958	Upload Photo	Q26671287
Woodville	II	London Road			22 August 1966	TR2795844783; 51°09′25″N 1°15′31″E		1070035	Upload Photo	Q26323555

== See also ==
- Grade I listed buildings in Kent
- Grade II* listed buildings in Kent

== Sources ==
- Newman, John (2013) [1969], Kent: North-East and East, The Buildings of England, New Haven and London: Yale University Press, ISBN 978-0-300-18506-5
