= Listed buildings in Eastry =

Historic structures in Kent, England

Eastry is a village and civil parish in the Dover District of Kent, England. It contains 68 listed buildings that are recorded in the National Heritage List for England. Of these three are grade I, four are grade II* and 61 are grade II.

This list is based on the information retrieved online from Historic England.

== Key ==
Grade	Criteria
I	Buildings that are of exceptional interest
II*	Particularly important buildings of more than special interest
II	Buildings that are of special interest

== Listing ==
Name	Grade	Location	Type	Completed (Note: The date given is the date used by Historic England as significant for the initial building or that of an important part in the structure's description.)	Date designated	Grid ref. (Note: The grid reference is based on the British national grid reference system, sometimes known as OSGB36, used by the Ordnance Survey.) Geo-coordinates	Notes	Entry number (Note: The "List Entry Number" is a unique number assigned to each listed building and scheduled monument by Historic England.)	Image	Wikidata
Barn About 2o Metres North East of Shingleton Farmhouse	II				26 November 1987	TR2871252681; 51°13′39″N 1°16′28″E		1366583	Upload Photo	Q26648170
Barn Immediately North of Little Statenborough Villa	II				29 November 1988	TR3118055633; 51°15′11″N 1°18′42″E		1070080	Upload Photo	Q26323626
Shingleton Farmhouse	II				11 October 1963	TR2867152663; 51°13′38″N 1°16′26″E		1070207	Upload Photo	Q26323871
Venson Farmhouse	II				26 November 1987	TR3002352677; 51°13′37″N 1°17′35″E		1363285	Upload Photo	Q26645119
Brook Close Cottage	II	8, Brook Street			26 November 1987	TR3105254652; 51°14′39″N 1°18′33″E		1055823	Upload Photo	Q26307444
Amber Close	II	Brook Street			26 November 1987	TR3131654636; 51°14′38″N 1°18′46″E		1366586	Upload Photo	Q26648172
Bank Cottage	II	Brook Street			27 February 1979	TR3142054685; 51°14′40″N 1°18′52″E		1363286	Upload Photo	Q26645120
Brook Cottage	II	Brook Street	thatched cottage		26 November 1987	TR3116854628; 51°14′38″N 1°18′39″E		1070208	Brook Cottage More images	Q26323873
Brook House	II*	Brook Street	house		11 October 1963	TR3121054568; 51°14′36″N 1°18′41″E		1055854	Brook House More images	Q17557454
Firbank	II	Brook Street			11 October 1963	TR3107254636; 51°14′39″N 1°18′34″E		1070209	Upload Photo	Q26323875
Albion Place	II	1 and 2 Albion Place, Church Street			26 November 1987	TR3100554719; 51°14′41″N 1°18′30″E		1070212	Upload Photo	Q26323883
Number 2 and Holme	II	2, Church Street			26 November 1987	TR3098054701; 51°14′41″N 1°18′29″E		1070213	Upload Photo	Q26323885
Church of St Mary the Virgin	I	Church Street	church building		11 October 1963	TR3111254777; 51°14′43″N 1°18′36″E		1363287	Church of St Mary the Virgin More images	Q17529786
Eastry Court	I	Church Street	building		13 October 1952	TR3112554816; 51°14′44″N 1°18′37″E		1366610	Eastry Court More images	Q17529790
Eastry Court Cottages	II	Church Street			26 November 1987	TR3108054847; 51°14′45″N 1°18′35″E		1363288	Upload Photo	Q26645121
Little Close	II	Church Street			26 November 1987	TR3099654712; 51°14′41″N 1°18′30″E		1366600	Upload Photo	Q26648184
The Aumbry	II	Church Street			26 November 1987	TR3111754695; 51°14′40″N 1°18′36″E		1055828	Upload Photo	Q26307450
The Old Vicarage	II	Church Street, CT13 0HQ			11 October 1963	TR3103254697; 51°14′41″N 1°18′32″E		1070210	Upload Photo	Q26323877
Tomb Chest to Thomas Rammell 1 Metre South of Church of St Mary	II	Church Street			26 November 1987	TR3112054766; 51°14′43″N 1°18′36″E		1055806	Upload Photo	Q26307427
Churchyard Wall and Gates to North, East and West of Church of St Mary	II	East And West Of Church Of St Mary, Church Street			26 November 1987	TR3112554790; 51°14′44″N 1°18′37″E		1070211	Upload Photo	Q26323880
Felderland House	II*	Felderland Lane			11 October 1963	TR3206255908; 51°15′18″N 1°19′28″E		1363307	Upload Photo	Q17557893
Walled Garden About 10 Metres West of Felderland House	II	Felderland Lane			26 November 1987	TR3202155888; 51°15′18″N 1°19′25″E		1070174	Upload Photo	Q26323808
Barn About 30 Metres South West of Gore Court	II	Gore Lane			26 November 1987	TR3058155081; 51°14′54″N 1°18′09″E		1070175	Upload Photo	Q26323810
Gore Court	II	Gore Lane			11 October 1963	TR3062555098; 51°14′54″N 1°18′12″E		1363308	Upload Photo	Q26645140
Stables and Wall About 30 Metres South of Gore Court	II	Gore Lane			26 November 1987	TR3060955055; 51°14′53″N 1°18′11″E		1070176	Upload Photo	Q26323812
Beckets	II	Gore Road			26 November 1987	TR3091355049; 51°14′52″N 1°18′26″E		1070192	Upload Photo	Q26323842
Bay Tree Cottage Ham Ponds Cottage	II	Hay Lane			26 October 1978	TR3288255239; 51°14′55″N 1°20′08″E		1363271	Upload Photo	Q26645107
Hay Farm House	II	Hay Lane			26 November 1987	TR3217354574; 51°14′35″N 1°19′30″E		1070177	Upload Photo	Q26323814
Barn About 20 Metres South of Heronden	II	Heronden			11 October 1963	TR2957254232; 51°14′28″N 1°17′16″E		1057678	Upload Photo	Q26309845
Barn and Outhouse About 40 Metres South East of Heronden	II	Heronden			11 October 1963	TR2961554232; 51°14′28″N 1°17′18″E		1070179	Upload Photo	Q26323819
Granary/stables About 30 Metres South East of Heronden	II	Heronden			11 October 1963	TR2961354243; 51°14′28″N 1°17′18″E		1057650	Upload Photo	Q26309821
Heronden	II*	Heronden	building		11 October 1963	TR2956054265; 51°14′29″N 1°17′15″E		1363272	Heronden More images	Q17557891
Lower Heronden Farmhouse	II	Heronden			26 November 1987	TR2958854111; 51°14′24″N 1°17′16″E		1039112	Upload Photo	Q26290892
Stables and Wall About 55 Metres South East of Heronden	II	Heronden			11 October 1963	TR2959954214; 51°14′27″N 1°17′17″E		1070178	Upload Photo	Q26323817
Walls and Gatepiers to South and East of Heronden and Enclosing Lower Courtyard	II	Heronden			26 November 1987	TR2958454213; 51°14′27″N 1°17′16″E		1363273	Upload Photo	Q26645108
Number 5 (zephyrine) and Number 6	II	6, High Street			10 August 1977	TR3094554750; 51°14′43″N 1°18′27″E		1039092	Upload Photo	Q26290871
Bowmans Tea Shop Bushley Cottage	II	High Street			26 November 1987	TR3095654883; 51°14′47″N 1°18′28″E		1039119	Upload Photo	Q26290900
Cottage Adjacent to and South of the Post Office	II	High Street			26 November 1987	TR3094454797; 51°14′44″N 1°18′27″E		1039125	Upload Photo	Q26290906
Eastry House	II	High Street			26 November 1987	TR3092854868; 51°14′46″N 1°18′27″E		1070181	Upload Photo	Q26323824
Larkfield	II	High Street			26 November 1987	TR3094254829; 51°14′45″N 1°18′27″E		1374151	Upload Photo	Q26655050
The Bull Inn and Rear Courtyard	II	High Street	pub		26 November 1987	TR3096354770; 51°14′43″N 1°18′28″E		1070180	The Bull Inn and Rear Courtyard More images	Q26323822
The General Stores	II	High Street			26 November 1987	TR3094654769; 51°14′43″N 1°18′28″E		1070183	Upload Photo	Q26323828
W E Hunt and Son and House Attached	II	High Street			26 November 1987	TR3094354820; 51°14′45″N 1°18′27″E		1070182	Upload Photo	Q26323826
Avoca Bank House Tantwy	II	Lower Street			26 November 1987	TR3095854633; 51°14′39″N 1°18′28″E		1070185	Upload Photo	Q26323832
Cross Farm	II	Lower Street			26 November 1987	TR3098154507; 51°14′35″N 1°18′29″E		1070184	Upload Photo	Q26323830
Fairfield Cottage	II	Lower Street			27 February 1979	TR3092154584; 51°14′37″N 1°18′26″E		1038942	Upload Photo	Q26290720
Fairfield House	I	Lower Street	building		11 October 1963	TR3093954579; 51°14′37″N 1°18′27″E		1070186	Fairfield House More images	Q17529719
The Old Brewery House	II	Lower Street			26 November 1987	TR3098154646; 51°14′39″N 1°18′29″E		1039098	Upload Photo	Q26290878
Mill Lane Cottages Providence Chapel	II	1-5, Mill Lane			26 November 1987	TR3081454671; 51°14′40″N 1°18′21″E		1363275	Upload Photo	Q26645110
Millbank Cottages	II	7 and 8, Mill Lane			10 August 1977	TR3023054524; 51°14′36″N 1°17′50″E		1038331	Upload Photo	Q26290045
Eastry Mill	II	Mill Lane	smock mill		13 October 1952	TR3038554551; 51°14′37″N 1°17′58″E		1070187	Eastry Mill More images	Q7898795
Tewkesbury House	II	Mill Lane			26 November 1987	TR3039854565; 51°14′37″N 1°17′59″E		1374494	Upload Photo	Q26655362
Great Walton	II	Sandwich Road			26 November 1987	TR3109255357; 51°15′02″N 1°18′36″E		1070189	Upload Photo	Q26323836
Little Statenborough Farm Tr 316 556	II	Sandwich Road, Statenborough			26 November 1987	TR3164255676; 51°15′11″N 1°19′05″E		1038338	Upload Photo	Q26290052
The White House	II	Sandwich Road			26 November 1987	TR3094455049; 51°14′52″N 1°18′28″E		1038304	Upload Photo	Q26290020
Walton House and Coachhouse Adjoining	II	Sandwich Road			11 October 1963	TR3109255142; 51°14′55″N 1°18′36″E		1070188	Upload Photo	Q26323834
Barn and Granary About 20 Metres South East of Little Selson	II	Selson			26 November 1987	TR3025755394; 51°15′04″N 1°17′54″E		1070191	Upload Photo	Q26323840
Great Selson	II*	Selson	architectural structure		11 October 1963	TR3006055552; 51°15′10″N 1°17′44″E		1038321	Great Selson More images	Q17557375
Little Selson and Outbuildings and Wall	II	Selson			13 October 1952	TR3026155426; 51°15′05″N 1°17′54″E		1038289	Upload Photo	Q26290005
Old Selson House	II	Selson			11 October 1963	TR3026255445; 51°15′06″N 1°17′54″E		1363276	Upload Photo	Q26645111
Stable Range About 30 Metres North West of Old Selson House	II	Selson			26 November 1987	TR3025555493; 51°15′08″N 1°17′54″E		1070190	Upload Photo	Q26323838
Stables and Wall About 10 Metres North of Great Selson	II	Selson			26 November 1987	TR3004955569; 51°15′10″N 1°17′43″E		1363277	Upload Photo	Q26645112
Wells Farmhouse	II	Selson			13 October 1952	TR3040855339; 51°15′02″N 1°18′01″E		1374528	Upload Photo	Q26655393
Cobbler's Cottage Cross Cottage	II	The Cross			26 November 1987	TR3095854657; 51°14′39″N 1°18′28″E		1070173	Upload Photo	Q26323806
Horse Trough About 35 Metres North of the Riding Habit	II	The Cross			26 November 1987	TR3095654722; 51°14′42″N 1°18′28″E		1363289	Upload Photo	Q26645122
The Five Bells	II	The Cross	pub		11 October 1963	TR3097854670; 51°14′40″N 1°18′29″E		1366628	The Five Bells More images	Q26648209
The Riding Habit and Wall Attached	II	The Cross			11 October 1963	TR3094454687; 51°14′40″N 1°18′27″E		1070172	Upload Photo	Q26323804

== See also ==
- Grade I listed buildings in Kent
- Grade II* listed buildings in Kent

== Sources ==
- Newman, John (2013) [1969], Kent: North-East and East, The Buildings of England, New Haven and London: Yale University Press, ISBN 978-0-300-18506-5
