= Listed buildings in Great Mongeham =

Historic structures in Kent, England

Great Mongeham is a village and civil parish in the Dover District of Kent, England. It contains 17 listed buildings that are recorded in the National Heritage List for England. Of these one is grade II* and 16 are grade II.

This list is based on the information retrieved online from Historic England.

== Key ==
| Grade | Criteria |
|---|---|
| I | Buildings that are of exceptional interest |
| II* | Particularly important buildings of more than special interest |
| II | Buildings that are of special interest |

== Listing ==
| Name | Grade | Location | Type | Completed (Note: The date given is the date used by Historic England as significant for the initial building or that of an important part in the structure's description.) | Date designated | Grid ref. (Note: The grid reference is based on the British national grid reference system, sometimes known as OSGB36, used by the Ordnance Survey.) Geo-coordinates | Notes | Entry number (Note: The "List Entry Number" is a unique number assigned to each listed building and scheduled monument by Historic England.) | Image | Wikidata |
|---|---|---|---|---|---|---|---|---|---|---|
| Gravestone/cross Immediately South West of Tower of Church of St Martin | II | | | | 27 April 1988 | TR3460551489; 51°12′52″N 1°21′28″E | | 1069755 | Upload Photo | Q26323024 |
| Great Mongeham Farmhouse | II | Cherry Lane | | | 8 February 1974 | TR3466151283; 51°12′45″N 1°21′31″E | | 1069855 | Upload Photo | Q26323210 |
| Ivy House | II | Church Path | | | 1 June 1949 | TR3500051347; 51°12′47″N 1°21′48″E | | 1069859 | Upload Photo | Q26323218 |
| Redoury Cottage | II | Church Path | | | 8 February 1974 | TR3501151362; 51°12′47″N 1°21′49″E | | 1069858 | Upload Photo | Q26323216 |
| Barn at Hillside Farm | II | Ellens Road | | | 8 February 1974 | TR3504651306; 51°12′45″N 1°21′50″E | | 1069832 | Upload Photo | Q26323175 |
| Hillside Farmhouse | II | Ellens Road | | | 8 February 1974 | TR3506651319; 51°12′46″N 1°21′52″E | | 1363450 | Upload Photo | Q26645276 |
| 110, Mongeham Road | II | 110, Mongeham Road, Deal | | | 14 February 1989 | TR3537751806; 51°13′01″N 1°22′09″E | | 1254092 | Upload Photo | Q26545780 |
| 112, Mongeham Road | II | 112, Mongeham Road, Deal | | | 14 February 1989 | TR3537151797; 51°13′01″N 1°22′08″E | | 1261480 | Upload Photo | Q26552426 |
| Manor Farm House | II | 181, Mongeham Road | | | 1 June 1949 | TR3510551558; 51°12′53″N 1°21′54″E | | 1069776 | Upload Photo | Q26323064 |
| 226 and 228, Mongeham Road | II | 226 and 228, Mongeham Road | | | 8 February 1974 | TR3501451289; 51°12′45″N 1°21′49″E | | 1363460 | Upload Photo | Q26645286 |
| Brewer's Farmhouse | II | Mongeham Road | | | 1 June 1949 | TR3508051580; 51°12′54″N 1°21′53″E | | 1069775 | Upload Photo | Q26323062 |
| Walled Garden at the Manor House to South West of House | II | Mongeham Road | | | 13 July 1989 | TR3510651534; 51°12′52″N 1°21′54″E | | 1069757 | Upload Photo | Q26323028 |
| Church House | II | Northbourne Road | | | 1 June 1949 | TR3469751496; 51°12′52″N 1°21′33″E | | 1261551 | Upload Photo | Q26552492 |
| Church of St Martin | II* | Northbourne Road | church building | | 1 June 1949 | TR3461951504; 51°12′52″N 1°21′29″E | | 1069782 | Church of St Martin More images | Q17557616 |
| Great Mongeham House | II | Northbourne Road | | | 8 February 1974 | TR3463951462; 51°12′51″N 1°21′30″E | | 1343714 | Upload Photo | Q26627491 |
| Stone Hall | II | Northbourne Road | | | 1 June 1949 | TR3499251631; 51°12′56″N 1°21′48″E | | 1069781 | Upload Photo | Q26323074 |
| The Old Rectory | II | Northbourne Road | | | 1 June 1949 | TR3460451536; 51°12′53″N 1°21′28″E | | 1261552 | Upload Photo | Q26552493 |

== See also ==
- Grade I listed buildings in Kent
- Grade II* listed buildings in Kent

== Sources ==
- Newman, John (2013) [1969], Kent: North-East and East, The Buildings of England, New Haven and London: Yale University Press, ISBN 978-0-300-18506-5
