= Listed buildings in Whitfield, Kent =

Civil Parish in Kent, England

Whitfield is a village and civil parish in the Dover District of Kent, England. It contains six listed buildings that are recorded in the National Heritage List for England. Of these one is grade II* and five are grade II.

This list is based on the information retrieved online from Historic England.

== Key ==
| Grade | Criteria |
|---|---|
| I | Buildings that are of exceptional interest |
| II* | Particularly important buildings of more than special interest |
| II | Buildings that are of special interest |

== Listing ==
| Name | Grade | Location | Type | Completed (Note: The date given is the date used by Historic England as significant for the initial building or that of an important part in the structure's description.) | Date designated | Grid ref. (Note: The grid reference is based on the British national grid reference system, sometimes known as OSGB36, used by the Ordnance Survey.) Geo-coordinates | Notes | Entry number (Note: The "List Entry Number" is a unique number assigned to each listed building and scheduled monument by Historic England.) | Image | Wikidata |
|---|---|---|---|---|---|---|---|---|---|---|
| Bewsbury Cross House and Coachhouse | II | Bewsbury Cross Lane | | | 25 July 1980 | TR2996345265; 51°09′37″N 1°17′15″E | | 1068605 | Upload Photo | Q26321306 |
| Church of St Peter | II* | Church Whitfield Road | church building | | 23 April 1987 | TR3107145886; 51°09′56″N 1°18′13″E | | 1068592 | Church of St Peter More images | Q17557466 |
| Sparrow Court | II | Forge Lane | | | 23 April 1987 | TR2996345793; 51°09′54″N 1°17′16″E | | 1068612 | Upload Photo | Q26321312 |
| Barn at Singledge Farm | II | Singledge Lane | | | 28 May 1987 | TR2886045888; 51°09′59″N 1°16′20″E | | 1069996 | Upload Photo | Q26323488 |
| Singledge | II | Singledge Lane | | | 22 August 1966 | TR2882345778; 51°09′56″N 1°16′18″E | | 1070036 | Upload Photo | Q26323557 |
| Temple Farmhouse | II | Singledge Lane | | | 27 August 1952 | TR2882445447; 51°09′45″N 1°16′17″E | | 1070037 | Upload Photo | Q26323559 |

== See also ==
- Grade I listed buildings in Kent
- Grade II* listed buildings in Kent

== Sources ==
- Newman, John (2013) [1969], Kent: North-East and East, The Buildings of England, New Haven and London: Yale University Press, ISBN 978-0-300-18506-5
