= Listed buildings in Northbourne, Kent =

Historic structures in Kent, England

Northbourne is a village and civil parish in the Dover District of Kent, England. It contains 53 listed buildings that are recorded in the National Heritage List for England. Of these one is grade I, five are grade II* and 47 are grade II.

This list is based on the information retrieved online from Historic England.

== Key ==
Grade	Criteria
I	Buildings that are of exceptional interest
II*	Particularly important buildings of more than special interest
II	Buildings that are of special interest

== Listing ==
Name	Grade	Location	Type	Completed (Note: The date given is the date used by Historic England as significant for the initial building or that of an important part in the structure's description.)	Date designated	Grid ref. (Note: The grid reference is based on the British national grid reference system, sometimes known as OSGB36, used by the Ordnance Survey.) Geo-coordinates	Notes	Entry number (Note: The "List Entry Number" is a unique number assigned to each listed building and scheduled monument by Historic England.)	Image	Wikidata
Betteshanger House Northbourne Park School	II*	Betteshanger	school building		5 June 1973	TR3104452538; 51°13′31″N 1°18′27″E		1236988	Betteshanger House Northbourne Park School More images	Q17557759
Church of St Mary	II	Betteshanger	church building		24 March 1987	TR3125352508; 51°13′30″N 1°18′38″E		1237109	Church of St Mary More images	Q26530282
Home Farmhouse , Garden Cottage, Walled Gardens and Stable Range	II	Betteshanger			24 March 1988	TR3123952623; 51°13′33″N 1°18′38″E		1237097	Upload Photo	Q26530273
Lower Lodge	II	Betteshanger			24 March 1987	TR3146252728; 51°13′36″N 1°18′49″E		1236990	Upload Photo	Q26530179
Telegraph Farm	II	Betteshanger			11 August 1999	TR3115451092; 51°12′44″N 1°18′30″E		1388359	Upload Photo	Q26667913
The Cloisters	II	Betteshanger			5 June 1973	TR3150652767; 51°13′38″N 1°18′52″E		1264319	Upload Photo	Q26555025
Cowhouse About 30 Metres East of Walled Garden Complex at Betteshanger Park	II	Betteshanger House			24 March 1987	TR3130252564; 51°13′31″N 1°18′41″E		1236991	Upload Photo	Q26530180
Garden Terraces About 50 Metres West of Church of St Mary	II	Betteshanger House			24 March 1987	TR3116652539; 51°13′31″N 1°18′34″E		1236989	Upload Photo	Q26530178
Garden Terraces and Plant Tubs About 50 Metres South of Betteshanger House	II	Betteshanger House			24 March 1987	TR3104752511; 51°13′30″N 1°18′27″E		1237079	Upload Photo	Q26530257
Gate Lodge to Betteshanger House	II	Betteshanger House			24 March 1987	TR3114452879; 51°13′42″N 1°18′33″E		1237084	Upload Photo	Q26530262
Walls and Gateways to Front Court of Betteshanger House	II	Betteshanger House			5 June 1973	TR3108352533; 51°13′31″N 1°18′29″E		1264318	Upload Photo	Q26555024
Longdane Cottage (nos 1 and 2)	II	Deal Road			24 March 1987	TR3322852211; 51°13′17″N 1°20′19″E		1264320	Upload Photo	Q26555026
Church of St George	II*	Ham	church building		24 March 1987	TR3261854773; 51°14′41″N 1°19′54″E		1264237	Church of St George More images	Q17557826
Ham Manor	II	Ham House			13 October 1952	TR3255554679; 51°14′38″N 1°19′50″E		1236992	Upload Photo	Q26530181
Stable Block About 40 Metres South East of Ham Manor	II	Ham House			24 March 1987	TR3259454652; 51°14′37″N 1°19′52″E		1237144	Upload Photo	Q26530314
Pippins and Mistways	II	Hay Lane			24 March 1987	TR3285355185; 51°14′54″N 1°20′07″E		1236993	Upload Photo	Q26530182
Home Farm	II	Home Farm			24 March 1987	TR3221052484; 51°13′27″N 1°19′27″E		1264321	Upload Photo	Q26555027
The Mill House	II	Little Betteshanger			24 March 1987	TR3256152377; 51°13′23″N 1°19′45″E		1237146	Upload Photo	Q26530316
The White House	II	Little Betteshanger			24 March 1987	TR3255752394; 51°13′24″N 1°19′45″E		1236994	Upload Photo	Q26530184
Barn and Farmyard Buildings 10-50 Metres South East of Marley Cottage	II	Marley Lane, Marley			24 March 1987	TR3340653511; 51°13′59″N 1°20′31″E		1236998	Upload Photo	Q26530188
Barns About 30 Metres Southwest of Finglesham Farmhouse	II	Marley Lane, Finglesham			24 March 1987	TR3349753788; 51°14′08″N 1°20′37″E		1236996	Upload Photo	Q26530186
Finglesham Farmhouse	II	Marley Lane, Finglesham Farm			11 October 1963	TR3350653829; 51°14′09″N 1°20′37″E		1264322	Upload Photo	Q26555028
Thatch Cottage	II	Marley Lane, Marley			24 March 1987	TR3335853586; 51°14′01″N 1°20′29″E		1236997	Upload Photo	Q26530187
The Old Waggoners	II	Marley Lane, Finglesham, Deal, CT14 0NF, Marley Cottages			24 March 1987	TR3335853535; 51°14′00″N 1°20′29″E		1236999	Upload Photo	Q26530189
Wall About 15 Metres South-east of Finglesham Farmhouse	II	Marley Lane, Finglesham			24 March 1987	TR3352753819; 51°14′09″N 1°20′38″E		1236995	Upload Photo	Q26530185
The New Mill	II	Mill Lane	smock mill		11 October 1963	TR3306252034; 51°13′12″N 1°20′10″E		1237000	The New Mill More images	Q7010390
Barn About 20 Metres North of Northbourne Court	II*	Northbourne Court			13 October 1952	TR3364552251; 51°13′18″N 1°20′41″E		1237002	Upload Photo	Q17557764
Garden Walls at Northbourne Court	II*	Northbourne Court			13 October 1952	TR3370052184; 51°13′16″N 1°20′43″E		1237003	Upload Photo	Q17557766
Northbourne Court and Walls Attached	II	Northbourne Court			13 October 1952	TR3368652236; 51°13′17″N 1°20′43″E		1237001	Upload Photo	Q26530191
Stable Block Within Walled Gardens	II	Northbourne Court			24 March 1987	TR3368952138; 51°13′14″N 1°20′43″E		1264323	Upload Photo	Q26555029
Stable Court and Barn About 30 Metres East of Northbourne Court	II	Northbourne Court			13 October 1952	TR3369252303; 51°13′19″N 1°20′43″E		1264224	Upload Photo	Q26554946
Almonry Farmhouse	II	The Street			24 March 1987	TR3340352219; 51°13′17″N 1°20′28″E		1237006	Upload Photo	Q26530194
Church of St Augustine	I	The Street	church building		11 October 1963	TR3336452233; 51°13′18″N 1°20′26″E		1264324	Church of St Augustine More images	Q17529761
Fair Oak the Olde Cottage	II	The Street			24 March 1987	TR3345652163; 51°13′15″N 1°20′31″E		1237287	Upload Photo	Q26530441
Flint House	II	The Street			24 March 1987	TR3328152108; 51°13′14″N 1°20′22″E		1237004	Upload Photo	Q26530192
Garden Wall About 10 Metres East of Vine Farmhouse	II	The Street			24 March 1987	TR3344152121; 51°13′14″N 1°20′30″E		1264326	Upload Photo	Q26555031
Headstone About 5 Metres South of Church of St Augustine	II	The Street			24 March 1987	TR3335652230; 51°13′18″N 1°20′26″E		1237266	Upload Photo	Q26530421
Hill Top	II	The Street, Finglesham			27 February 1979	TR3342254098; 51°14′18″N 1°20′33″E		1237009	Upload Photo	Q26530197
Mausoleum About 4o Metres Northwest of Church of St Augustine	II	The Street			24 March 1987	TR3332152278; 51°13′19″N 1°20′24″E		1237280	Upload Photo	Q26530433
Pair of Tombchests About 20 and 30 Metres South of Church of St Augustines	II	The Street			24 March 1987	TR3334652216; 51°13′17″N 1°20′25″E		1237005	Upload Photo	Q26530193
Redberry Cottage Yew Tree Cottage	II	The Street			24 March 1987	TR3347452168; 51°13′15″N 1°20′32″E		1264325	Upload Photo	Q26555030
Vine Cottage	II	The Street			24 March 1987	TR3344552159; 51°13′15″N 1°20′30″E		1237007	Upload Photo	Q26530195
Vine Farmhouse	II*	The Street	farmhouse		13 October 1952	TR3341652109; 51°13′14″N 1°20′28″E		1237301	Vine Farmhouse More images	Q17557778
Vine Garden Cottage and Walls Attached	II	The Street			24 March 1987	TR3335852121; 51°13′14″N 1°20′26″E		1237008	Upload Photo	Q26530196
Vine Lodge	II	The Street			24 March 1987	TR3334752141; 51°13′15″N 1°20′25″E		1237244	Upload Photo	Q26530404
Wall About 30 Metres North of the Vine Farmhouse	II	The Street			24 March 1987	TR3339952146; 51°13′15″N 1°20′28″E		1264165	Upload Photo	Q26554893
Westhill House	II	The Street, Finglesham			24 March 1987	TR3344754059; 51°14′17″N 1°20′35″E		1264170	Upload Photo	Q26554897
Estate Cottage About 50 Metres South of Updown House	II	Updown			24 March 1987	TR3139053324; 51°13′56″N 1°18′47″E		1237010	Upload Photo	Q26530198
Garden Walls Adjacent to and South of Updown House	II	Updown, Updown House			24 March 1987	TR3143653316; 51°13′55″N 1°18′49″E		1237349	Upload Photo	Q26530498
Updown Farmhouse	II	Updown			13 July 1979	TR3194153782; 51°14′10″N 1°19′16″E		1237362	Upload Photo	Q26530510
Updown House and Attached Outbuildings	II	Updown, Updown House			11 October 1963	TR3141653401; 51°13′58″N 1°18′49″E		1264327	Upload Photo	Q26555032
Finglesham Grange	II	West Street, Finglesham Grange			24 March 1987	TR3297154169; 51°14′21″N 1°20′10″E		1264328	Upload Photo	Q26555033
West Street Farmhouse	II	West Street			24 March 1987	TR3273754148; 51°14′20″N 1°19′58″E		1264118	Upload Photo	Q26554848

== See also ==
- Grade I listed buildings in Kent
- Grade II* listed buildings in Kent

== Sources ==
- Newman, John (2013) [1969], Kent: North-East and East, The Buildings of England, New Haven and London: Yale University Press, ISBN 978-0-300-18506-5
