= A258 road =

Road in Kent, England

A258

Route information
- Maintained by Kent County Council
- Length: 12.5 mi (20.1 km)

Major junctions
- South end: Dover; 51.1252°N 1.3182°E
- A256; A2 A256
- North end: Sandwich; 51.2614°N 1.3284°E

Location
- Country: United Kingdom
- Constituent country: England
- Counties: Kent

Road network
- Roads in the United Kingdom; Motorways; A and B road zones

The A258 road is an A road in England, running through East Kent from Dover to Sandwich.

It begins at the A256 within Dover, running up Castle Hill and passing Dover Castle on its eastern side and the Duke of York's Royal Military School on its western side. It then crosses the A2 at a four-way roundabout (called Guston Roundabout) at the top of Jubilee Way before running behind the East Kent coast, with turn-offs to Westcliffe, Martin Mill and St Margaret's at Cliffe.

It then runs through Ringwould (passing Ripple Mill), Walmer and Deal. Whilst in Deal it is named 'the Strand' and it passes Deal Castle, then becomes part of a one-way traffic system in Deal, it heads up 'Victoria Road', then right onto 'Ranelagh Road' then left onto 'Prince of Wales Terrace' (beside the coastline). 'Deal Castle Road' leads back to the Ringwould/Dover route. The route heads away from the coast on 'Broad Street', where it crosses over the pedestrianised high street and becoming 'Queen Street'. It passes over the railway close to Deal Railway station. Then it becomes 'London Road' heading to Upper Deal. Then it heads north-west, passing Sholden and later Betteshanger Park. It is once again called the A258, passing through the hamlet of Hacklinge and past the junction to Finglesham and then the junction to Worth. When it reaches the southern part of Sandwich, near Woodnesborough, it terminates at another junction with the A256 (Sandwich By-pass) at Stone Cross.

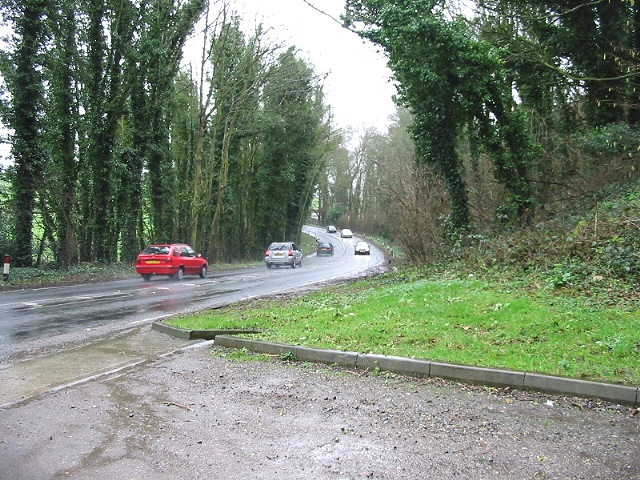
View of the A258 looking NE ( heading towards Ringwould)

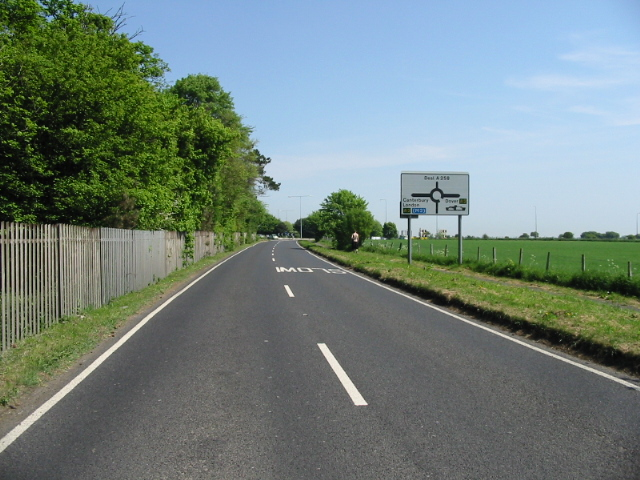
Looking NE along the A258 towards the Junction with the A2 at Guston Roundabout

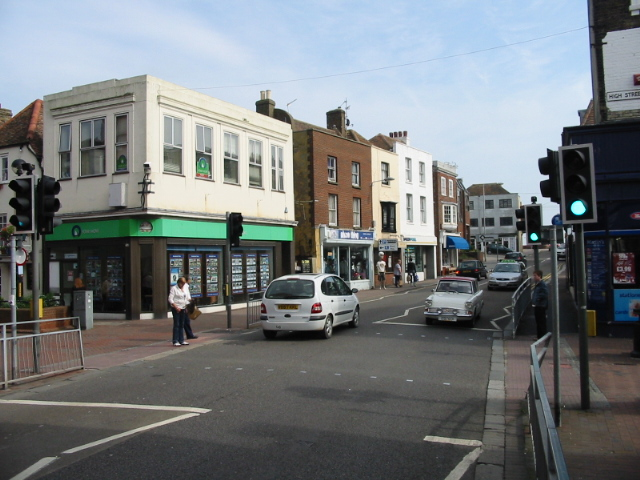
The A258 Queen Street (cutting through Deal High Street)

== Improvements ==
In 2006, improvement works were carried out to the A2(T)/A258 Guston Roundabout Junction, Dover. This meant the road from Deal was widened at the junction to allow for more queuing on the road.
