= Miner's Way Trail =

Walking trail in Kent, England

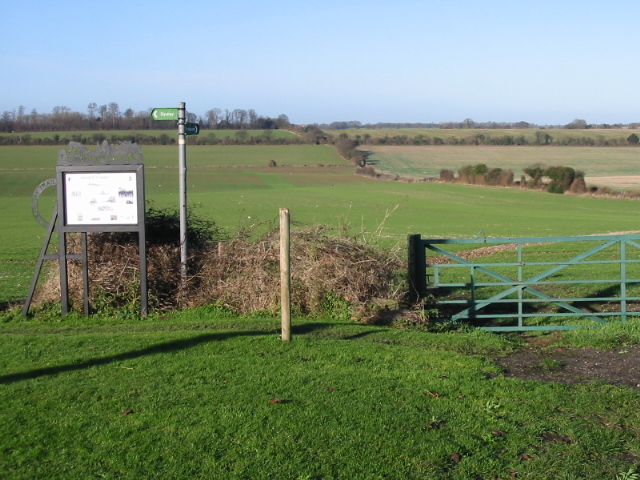
- Footpath and fields near Elvington
- Length: 27 mi (43 km)
- Location: South East England
- Trailheads: Sholden; 51.225°N 1.369°E Northbourne; 51.221°N 1.338°E; Betteshanger; 51.224°N 1.325°E; Tilmanstone; 51.215°N 1.295°E; Elvington; 51.209°N 1.257°E; Shepherdswell; 51.194°N 1.237°E; Barfrestone; 51.206°N 1.236°E; Nonington; 51.225°N 1.226°E; Aylesham; 51.226°N 1.202°E; Wingham; 51.271°N 1.213°E; Ash; 51.279°N 1.276°E; Eastry; 51.244°N 1.208°E Finglesham; 51.237°N 1.333°E
- Use: Hiking
- Season: All year

The Miner's Way Trail is a long-distance circular footpath in England, starting at Sholden, Kent. Linking up the coalfield parishes of East Kent. Including; the parishes of Deal, Ash, Aylesham, Chillenden, Eastry, Eythorne, Elvington, Goodnestone, Nonington, Northbourne, Coldred, Staple, Tilmanstone and Wingham.

The trail is approximately 27 miles (43 km) in length. A link route creates two shorter walks of around 14 miles each. The Waymark for the trail is a white circle with a miner's lamp, train and leaf.

A Cycle Trail 30 miles (48 km) also follows most of the trail, starting and finishing at Deal. Sections of the cycling route follow the existing Sustrans National Cycle Network Regional Route 16 (Dover to Canterbury, via Adisham) also and connects with Regional Route 17 (to Sandwich). Linking to the Viking Coastal Trail and National Cycle Route 1. The route can be comfortably completed in a day.

== History ==
In 2001, Dover District Council launched the 'Coalfields Heritage Initiative Kent' (CHIK) project, led by Dover Museum and the White Cliffs Countryside Project. The CHIK project's aim was to record and preserve East Kent's mining heritage. In 1890, Coal was discovered near Dover; this led to a small industry based on the mineral being set-up. Many coal mines were started, only to quickly fail, and just 4 collieries survived; Snowdown, Tilmanstone, Betteshanger and Chislet. Most of the workers for these new mines came from traditional coal areas, including south Wales, the Midlands and the North East. New villages were built to house them, including Aylesham, Elvington, Hersden and Mill Hill in Deal. The last colliery, Betteshanger, closed in 1989.

The trail has then been developed following current public footpaths, bridleway and byways to link all these coalfield linked villages. Much of this arable landscape, with its many hedges and woodlands, has not changed since Saxon times, boasting a long and rich history. The trail also links to the North Downs Way (another long distance path between Canterbury and Dover) and the East Kent Light Railway at Shepherdswell.

A guide book of the trails is available. Also 9 laminated leaflets describing circular walks are available.
