= Finglesham =

Village in Kent, England

Coordinates: 51.235°N 1.34°E

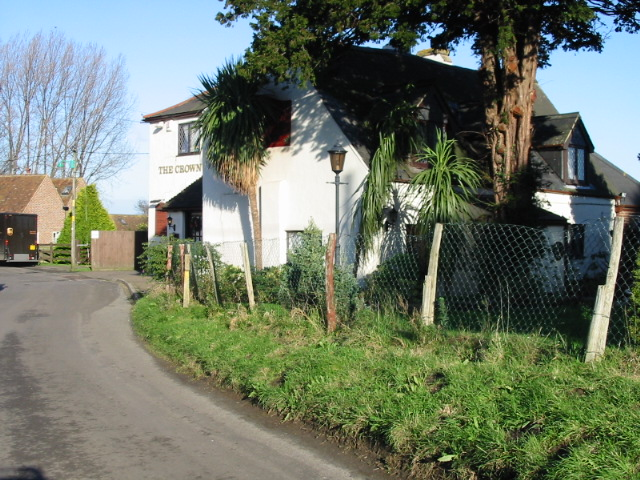
- The Crown public house, Finglesham

- Location within Kent
- OS grid reference: TR3353
- District: Dover
- Shire county: Kent
- Region: South East
- Country: England
- Sovereign state: United Kingdom
- Post town: Deal
- Postcode district: CT14 0
- Police: Kent
- Fire: Kent
- Ambulance: South East Coast

Finglesham is a village in the civil parish of Northbourne, and near Deal in Kent, England, which was the location of the Finglesham Anglo-Saxon cemetery, site of a seventh-century Anglo-Saxon archaeology find known as "Finglesham man," as described in 1965 by Sonia Chadwick Hawkes and Hilda Ellis Davidson. The village takes its name from the Old English Pengles-ham, meaning 'prince's manor', with the Anglo-Saxon cemetery containing a number of aristocratic burials. The population of the village is included in the civil parish of Northbourne.

It is also known for the presence of a famous road sign (actually at nearby Finglesham Estuary), pointing to the nearby places of both Ham and Sandwich (and thus reading "ham sandwich" as if referring to the common item of food).

The village is also on the Miner's Way Trail. The trail links up the coalfield parishes of East Kent.

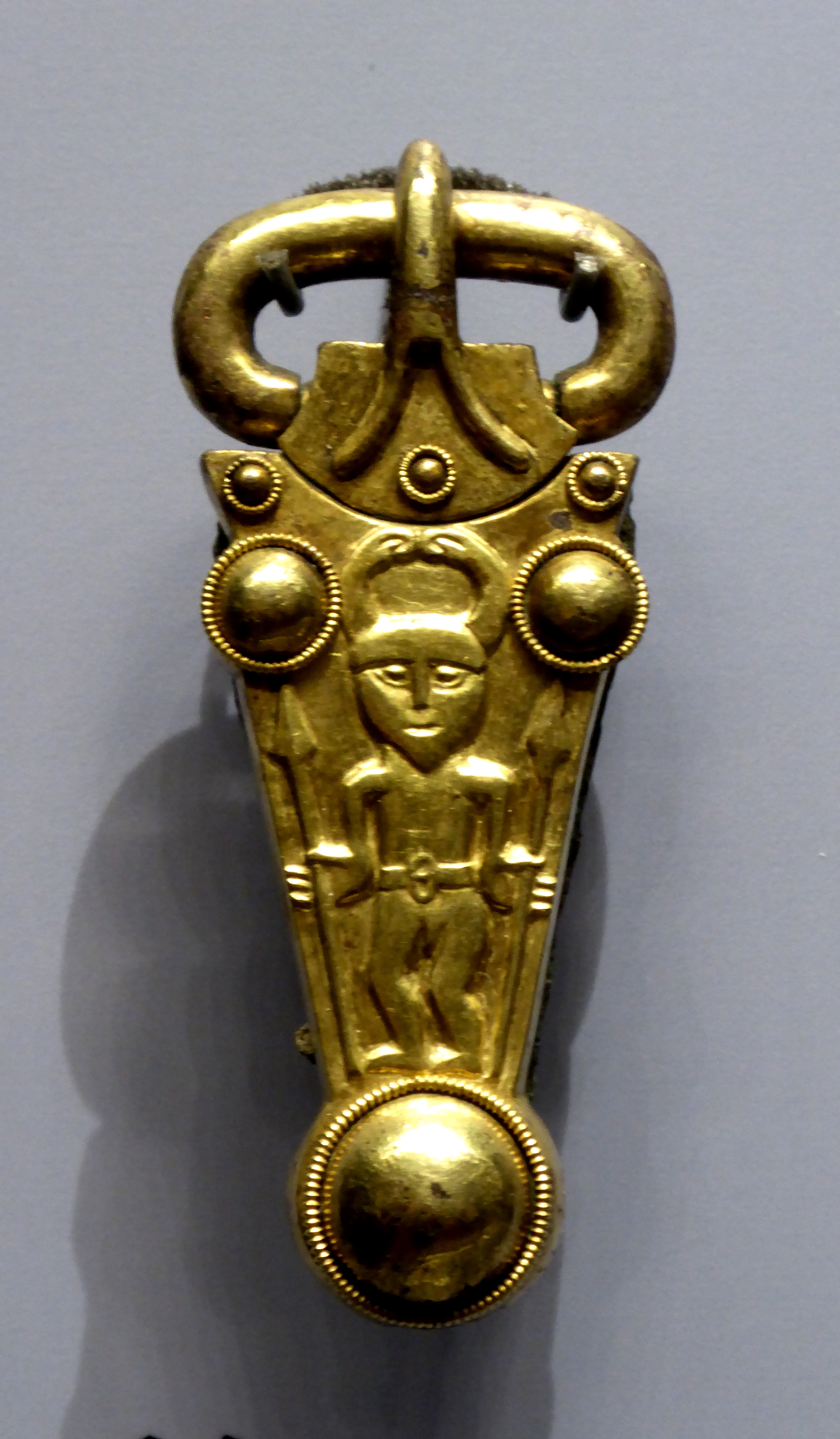
Finglesham buckle, showing the naked pagan God Woden with spears, horned helmet, belt buckle.

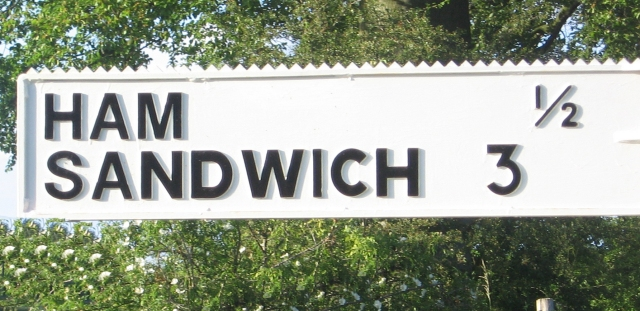
Ham Sandwich finger post
