= Elvington, Kent =

Village in Kent, England

Coordinates: 51°12′28″N 1°15′31″E

Elvington
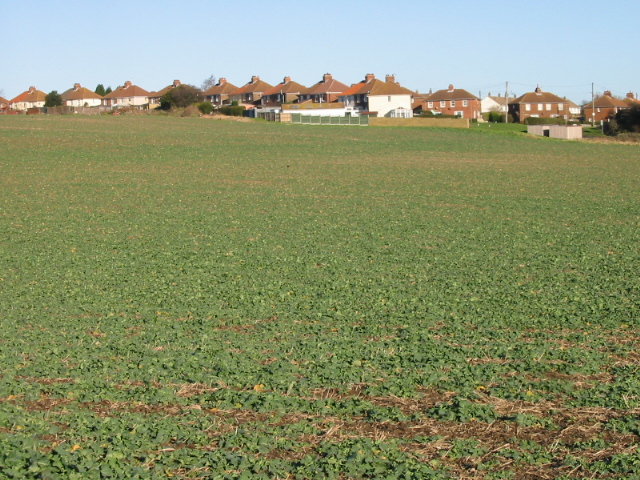
- Houses on Adelaide Road, Elvington

- Location within Kent
- OS grid reference: TR278502
- District: Dover
- Shire county: Kent
- Region: South East
- Country: England
- Sovereign state: United Kingdom
- Post town: Dover
- Postcode district: CT15
- Police: Kent
- Fire: Kent
- Ambulance: South East Coast
- UK Parliament: Dover and Deal

Elvington is a small pit village on a ridge in between Canterbury and Dover in the county of Kent in Southeast England. Located near Eythorne, Elvington was mostly built in the early 20th century to serve the nearby coal mine at Tilmanstone, as were other Kent Coalfield villages including Snowdown, Aylesham and Betteshanger.

== History ==
The name Elvington derives from the Old English meaning "farmstead of someone named Ælfwine"; a manor or farm of that name reportedly once stood at what is now the bowling club.

Apparently the Romans once marched through this area of Kent using the Ashey path to Barfrestone and the Roman Path across the downs and along what is now Roman Way, hence the name.

In 1916 the East Kent Light Railway opened a station at Elvington called Elvington Halt. This served passengers until 1948, and closed entirely in 1951.

Today the site of the mine is an industrial estate between Tilmanstone and Eythorne located on the Pike Road. A new housing estate was built in the mid-1990s and has been extensively added to.

The village is also on the Miner's Way Trail. Using the Roman Way to head to Shepherdswell. The trail links up the coalfield parishes of East Kent.

== Community ==
Services today include a community/learning centre, school, shop, hairdressers, and takeaway shop as well as local information centre providing access to training and employment for local residents. The post office closed in 2008. Eythorne Elvington Community Primary school serves 104 pupils from school years one to six from Elvington and Eythorne.

Recent investment from agencies such as the South East England Development Agency has led to the development of the former miners hall into a communication and learning centre.

Dover District Council has earmarked land around Elvington as potential for housing development in their recent draft local plan.
