= Barfrestone =

Village in Kent, England

Coordinates: 51.2058°N 1.2361°E

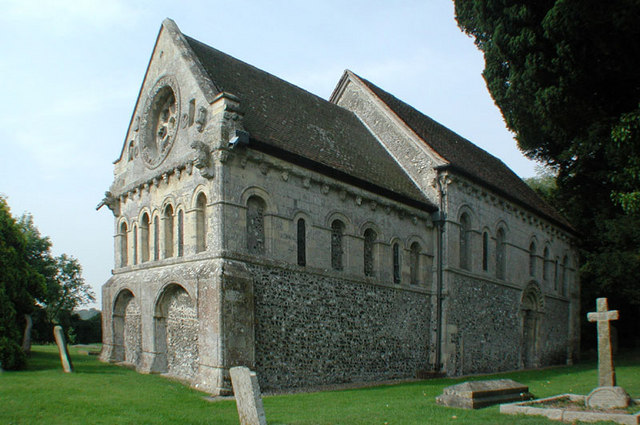
- St Nicholas' Church, Barfrestone

- Location within Kent
- OS grid reference: TR261501
- Civil parish: Eythorne
- District: Dover
- Shire county: Kent
- Region: South East
- Country: England
- Sovereign state: United Kingdom
- Post town: DOVER
- Postcode district: CT15
- Dialling code: 01304
- Police: Kent
- Fire: Kent
- Ambulance: South East Coast
- UK Parliament: Dover and Deal

Barfrestone is a village and (as Barfreston) a former civil parish, now in the parish of Eythorne, in the Dover district, in east Kent, England. It is between Shepherdswell, Eythorne and Nonington, close to the former pit villages of Elvington and Snowdown. In 1931 the parish had a population of 91. On 1 April 1935 the parish was abolished and merged with Eythorne.

Alternative spellings are Barfreston and Barfreystone. The old pronunciation was "Barson" (before 1800) and the ancient name, "Barfriston".

At the time of the Domesday Book, when the name was written 'Berfrestone', the manor was owned by Odo, Earl of Kent (as the Bishop of Bayeux). But after his trial (for fraud) in 1076, his assets were re-apportioned, including Barfrestone. The lands were then granted to Hugh de Port (an English feudal barony) for the defence of Dover Castle. The lands passed through the hands of many other owners including Sir Thomas Browne (during the reign of Henry VI of England).

Landmarks include the Grade I listed Norman church, which contains significant carvings of human and animal figures on both the exterior and interior of the church, as well as a very early post-Roman example of the Greek key motif carved on the inside coving. Also of note is the church bell set in a yew tree adjacent to the church and "Little Ewell", a converted rectory which, until 2013, was the location of the centre (house, offices and workshops) of the L'Arche Kent Community which has since moved to Canterbury, though a L'Arche house remains in the nearby village of Eythorne.

Another listed building in the village is Grade II listed Barfrestone Court,

The village is on the Miner's Way Trail which links the coalfield parishes of East Kent.

== Barfrestone in popular culture ==
A 'Barfrestone annulment' is local slang for constructing a piece of flat-pack furniture without reference to the instruction leaflet and, in some cases, without incorporating all of the components.

The village and church appear in Michael Paraskos's novel Barfrestone published in 2024.
