= Listed buildings in Sholden =

Civil Parish in Kent, England

Sholden is a village and civil parish in the Dover District of Kent, England. It contains 13 listed buildings that are recorded in the National Heritage List for England. Of these one is grade II* and 12 are grade II.

This list is based on the information retrieved online from Historic England.

== Key ==
Grade	Criteria
I	Buildings that are of exceptional interest
II*	Particularly important buildings of more than special interest
II	Buildings that are of special interest

== Listing ==
Name	Grade	Location	Type	Completed (Note: The date given is the date used by Historic England as significant for the initial building or that of an important part in the structure's description.)	Date designated	Grid ref. (Note: The grid reference is based on the British national grid reference system, sometimes known as OSGB36, used by the Ordnance Survey.) Geo-coordinates	Notes	Entry number (Note: The "List Entry Number" is a unique number assigned to each listed building and scheduled monument by Historic England.)	Image	Wikidata
Cottington Court Farmhouse	II				24 March 1987	TR3504153338; 51°13′51″N 1°21′55″E		1237019	Upload Photo	Q26530206
Wall and Outbuilding About 25 Metres South of Cottington Court Farmhouse	II	Cottington Court Farm			24 March 1987	TR3503153311; 51°13′50″N 1°21′54″E		1237020	Upload Photo	Q26530207
The Old Cottage	II	Deal, CT14 0AQ			17 April 2023	TR3582752712; 51°13′29″N 1°22′34″E		1485541	Upload Photo	Q126192115
Milestone at Tr 342 541	II	Deal Road			24 March 1987	TR3429954018; 51°14′14″N 1°21′18″E		1237022	Upload Photo	Q26530209
Foulmead	II	Fouldmead			24 March 1987	TR3455254028; 51°14′14″N 1°21′31″E		1237021	Upload Photo	Q26530208
Hull Place	II	1 2 and 3, Hull Place			24 March 1987	TR3568952787; 51°13′32″N 1°22′27″E		1237023	Upload Photo	Q26530210
Gates Gate Piers and Wall About 30 Metres North East of Hull Place	II	Hull Place			24 March 1987	TR3570652810; 51°13′33″N 1°22′28″E		1237024	Upload Photo	Q26530211
Stable Block and the Coach House About 50 Metres North West of Hull Place	II	Hull Place			24 March 1987	TR3563852842; 51°13′34″N 1°22′25″E		1237025	Upload Photo	Q26530212
The Dower House	II	Hull Place			24 March 1987	TR3576052790; 51°13′32″N 1°22′31″E		1264295	Upload Photo	Q26555004
Church of St Nicholas	II*	London Road	church building		11 October 1963	TR3592452170; 51°13′12″N 1°22′38″E		1237584	Church of St Nicholas More images	Q17557782
Sholden Hall	II	London Road			25 January 1978	TR3583152145; 51°13′11″N 1°22′33″E		1264296	Upload Photo	Q26555005
Tomb Chest and Headstone About 1.5 Metres East of Church of St Nicholas	II	London Road			24 March 1987	TR3593852163; 51°13′12″N 1°22′38″E		1237026	Upload Photo	Q26530213
Tomb Chest and Vault and Headstone About 2 and 5 Metres North of Church of St Nicholas	II	London Road			24 March 1987	TR3593552169; 51°13′12″N 1°22′38″E		1264004	Upload Photo	Q26554748

== See also ==
- Grade I listed buildings in Kent
- Grade II* listed buildings in Kent

== Sources ==
- Newman, John (2013) [1969], Kent: North-East and East, The Buildings of England, New Haven and London: Yale University Press, ISBN 978-0-300-18506-5
