= Listed buildings in St. Margaret's at Cliffe =

Civil Parish in Kent, England

St Margaret's at Cliffe is a village and civil parish in the Dover District of Kent, England. It contains 34 listed buildings that are recorded in the National Heritage List for England. Of these one is grade I, four are grade II* and 29 are grade II.

This list is based on the information retrieved online from Historic England.

== Key ==
Grade	Criteria
I	Buildings that are of exceptional interest
II*	Particularly important buildings of more than special interest
II	Buildings that are of special interest

== Listing ==
Name	Grade	Location	Type	Completed (Note: The date given is the date used by Historic England as significant for the initial building or that of an important part in the structure's description.)	Date designated	Grid ref. (Note: The grid reference is based on the British national grid reference system, sometimes known as OSGB36, used by the Ordnance Survey.) Geo-coordinates	Notes	Entry number (Note: The "List Entry Number" is a unique number assigned to each listed building and scheduled monument by Historic England.)	Image	Wikidata
Receiver Site and Royal Observer Corps Underground Nuclear Monitoring Post, Former Swingate Chain Home Radar Station	II				13 July 2012	TR3386643210; 51°08′25″N 1°20′31″E		1405533	Upload Photo	Q26675740
Transmitter Site (excluding Tower 2), Former Swingate Chain Home Radar Station	II				13 July 2012	TR3349942812; 51°08′13″N 1°20′11″E		1403955	Upload Photo	Q26675666
Cliffe Cottage	II	Cliffe Lane			23 April 1987	TR3594144835; 51°09′15″N 1°22′21″E		1347921	Upload Photo	Q26631340
Holly Lodge	II	Cliffe Lane			22 August 1966	TR3591644848; 51°09′15″N 1°22′20″E		1363363	Upload Photo	Q26645194
Transmitter Tower (tower 2), Transmitter Site, Former Swingate Chain Home Radar Station	II*	Deal Road, Swingate	transmitter station		13 July 2012	TR3345642915; 51°08′16″N 1°20′09″E		1405535	Transmitter Tower (tower 2), Transmitter Site, Former Swingate Chain Home Radar Station More images	Q7658652
Bere Farmhouse	II	Dover Road			22 August 1966	TR3379443721; 51°08′42″N 1°20′28″E		1101523	Upload Photo	Q26395032
Swingate Inn	II	Dover Road			23 April 1987	TR3356544067; 51°08′53″N 1°20′17″E		1070065	Upload Photo	Q26323602
Church of St Margaret	I	High Street	church building		22 August 1966	TR3587744771; 51°09′13″N 1°22′18″E		1101743	Church of St Margaret More images	Q17529744
Cliffe House	II	High Street			23 April 1987	TR3591344810; 51°09′14″N 1°22′20″E		1101769	Upload Photo	Q26395554
Cliffe Tavern Hotel	II	High Street	hotel		23 April 1987	TR3592844798; 51°09′14″N 1°22′20″E		1363365	Cliffe Tavern Hotel More images	Q26645196
Group of 3 Headstones About 3 to 6 Metres South of Chancel of Church of St Margaret	II	High Street			23 April 1987	TR3588944757; 51°09′12″N 1°22′18″E		1070069	Upload Photo	Q26323608
Group of 3 Headstones and Barrel Chest Tomb About 8 Metres North of Church of St Margaret	II	High Street			23 April 1987	TR3589044782; 51°09′13″N 1°22′18″E		1070029	Upload Photo	Q26323544
Group of 3 Headstones to Bowles Family About 15 Metres North West of Church of St Margaret	II	High Street			23 April 1987	TR3585144783; 51°09′13″N 1°22′16″E		1363347	Upload Photo	Q26645177
Group of 4 Headstones About 3 to 5 Metres East of Church of St Margaret	II	High Street			23 April 1987	TR3590044763; 51°09′12″N 1°22′19″E		1101722	Upload Photo	Q26395457
Headstone to Jane Kingham About 15 Metres East of Church of St Margaret	II	High Street			23 April 1987	TR3591244761; 51°09′12″N 1°22′20″E		1070070	Upload Photo	Q26323610
Headstone to Stephen Sayer About 8 Metres North East of Church of St Margaret	II	High Street			23 April 1987	TR3590144773; 51°09′13″N 1°22′19″E		1363328	Upload Photo	Q26645160
Hope Inn	II	High Street	pub		23 April 1987	TR3595744747; 51°09′12″N 1°22′22″E		1101466	Hope Inn More images	Q26394922
The Red Lion Inn	II	High Street	pub		8 September 1981	TR3581144921; 51°09′18″N 1°22′15″E		1070068	The Red Lion Inn More images	Q26323606
Townsend Farmhouse and Donkey Wheel House	II	High Street			26 October 1978	TR3575544937; 51°09′18″N 1°22′12″E		1363366	Upload Photo	Q26645197
Two Headstones About 2 to 4 Metres North of Church of St Margaret	II	High Street			23 April 1987	TR3587244780; 51°09′13″N 1°22′18″E		1346571	Upload Photo	Q26630095
St Margaret's Church of England Primary School	II	Kingsdown Road			12 January 1971	TR3589544980; 51°09′20″N 1°22′19″E		1070030	Upload Photo	Q26323546
Curfew Cottage	II	Sea Street			23 April 1987	TR3604344624; 51°09′08″N 1°22′26″E		1363349	Upload Photo	Q26645179
The Dover Patrol Monument (war Memorial) and Associated Railed Surround, Steps and Concrete Posts	II*	St Margaret's Bay	obelisk		22 August 1966	TR3733145207; 51°09′25″N 1°23′34″E		1070067	The Dover Patrol Monument (war Memorial) and Associated Railed Surround, Steps and Concrete Posts More images	Q23073283
Church of St Nicholas	II	St. Margaret's At Cliffe, Oxney			22 August 1966	TR3539946883; 51°10′22″N 1°21′58″E		1363348	Upload Photo	Q17641344
Church of St Peter	II*	St. Margaret's At Cliffe, Westcliffe	church building		22 August 1966	TR3487544801; 51°09′15″N 1°21′26″E		1070033	Church of St Peter More images	Q17557636
Oxney Court	II	St. Margaret's At Cliffe, Oxney			23 April 1987	TR3528946571; 51°10′12″N 1°21′52″E		1070031	Upload Photo	Q26323548
Wallets Court	II*	St. Margaret's At Cliffe, Westcliffe	hotel		27 August 1952	TR3490444742; 51°09′13″N 1°21′28″E		1084342	Wallets Court More images	Q17557716
Coastguard Cottages	II	1-9			22 March 1974	TR3646644372; 51°08′59″N 1°22′47″E		1347894	Upload Photo	Q26631316
High Gaut	II	The Front, South Foreland			23 April 1987	TR3634843624; 51°08′35″N 1°22′39″E		1363364	Upload Photo	Q26645195
South Foreland Lighthouse	II	The Front, South Foreland	lighthouse		23 April 1987	TR3591143305; 51°08′25″N 1°22′16″E		1101512	South Foreland Lighthouse More images	Q386221
St Margaret's Bay Windmill	II	The Front, South Foreland			22 August 1966	TR3626943514; 51°08′32″N 1°22′35″E		1101503	Upload Photo	Q7594096
St Margaret's Old Lighthouse	II	The Front, South Foreland	lighthouse		22 August 1966	TR3625543384; 51°08′27″N 1°22′34″E		1070066	St Margaret's Old Lighthouse More images	Q26323604
Wanstone Farmhouse	II	Upper Road			23 April 1987	TR3542043541; 51°08′34″N 1°21′51″E		1070032	Upload Photo	Q26323550

== See also ==
- Grade I listed buildings in Kent
- Grade II* listed buildings in Kent

== Sources ==
- Newman, John (2013) [1969], Kent: North-East and East, The Buildings of England, New Haven and London: Yale University Press, ISBN 978-0-300-18506-5
