= Elvington =

Elvington may refer to the following places in England:

- Elvington, Kent
- Elvington, North Yorkshire
  - RAF Elvington, a deactivated RAF station
