= Wingham, Kent =

Village in Kent, England

Coordinates: 51.2724°N 1.2171°E

Wingham
- Village
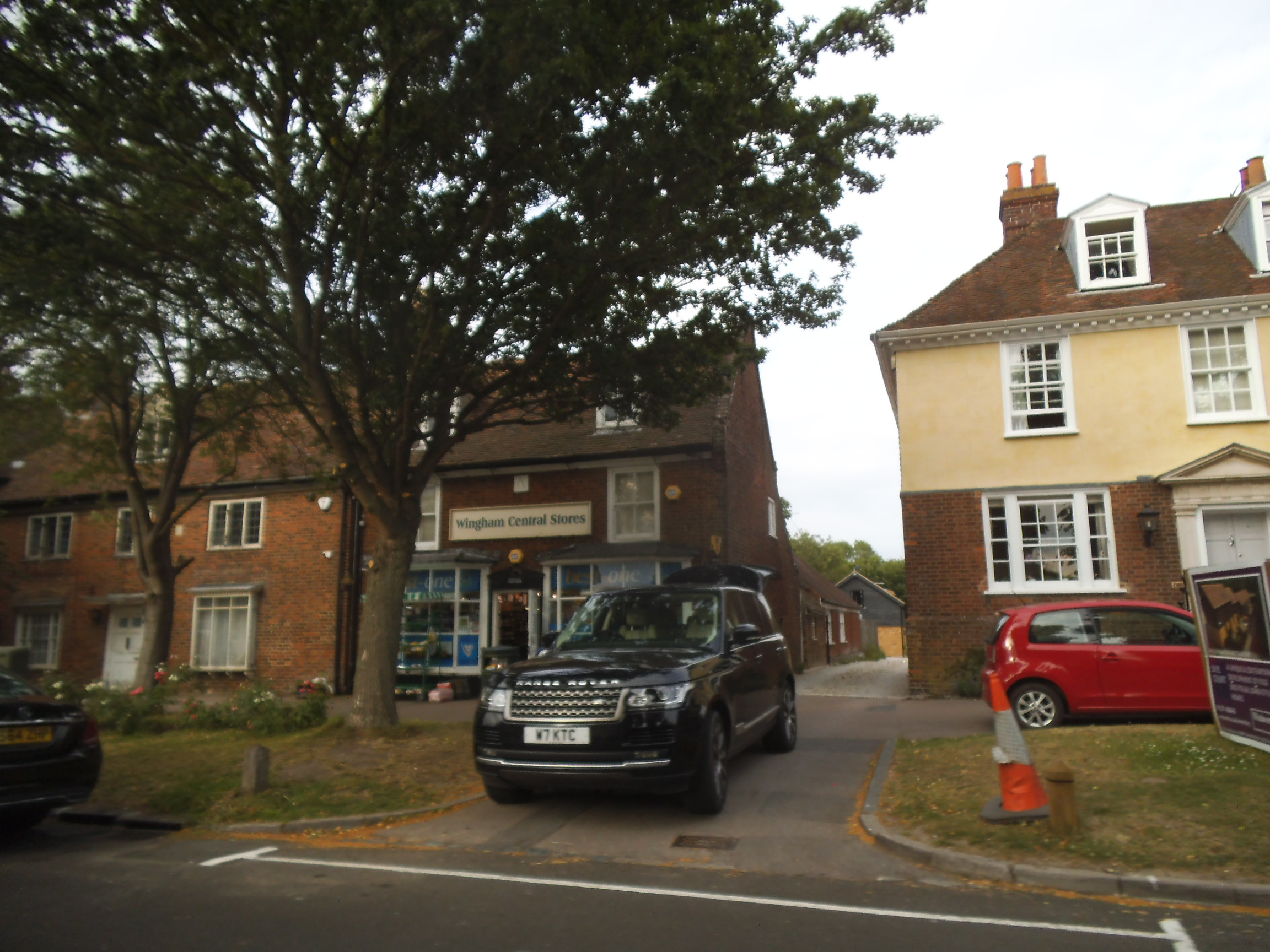
- High Street, Wingham

- Location within Kent
- Population: 1,754 (2021)
- OS grid reference: TR244575
- Civil parish: Wingham
- District: Dover
- Shire county: Kent
- Region: South East
- Country: England
- Sovereign state: United Kingdom
- Post town: Canterbury
- Postcode district: CT3
- Dialling code: 01227
- Police: Kent
- Fire: Kent
- Ambulance: South East Coast
- UK Parliament: Herne Bay and Sandwich

Wingham /ˈwɪŋəm/ is a village and civil parish in the Dover District of Kent, England. The village lies along the ancient coastal road, now the A257, from Richborough to London, and is close to Canterbury.

== History ==
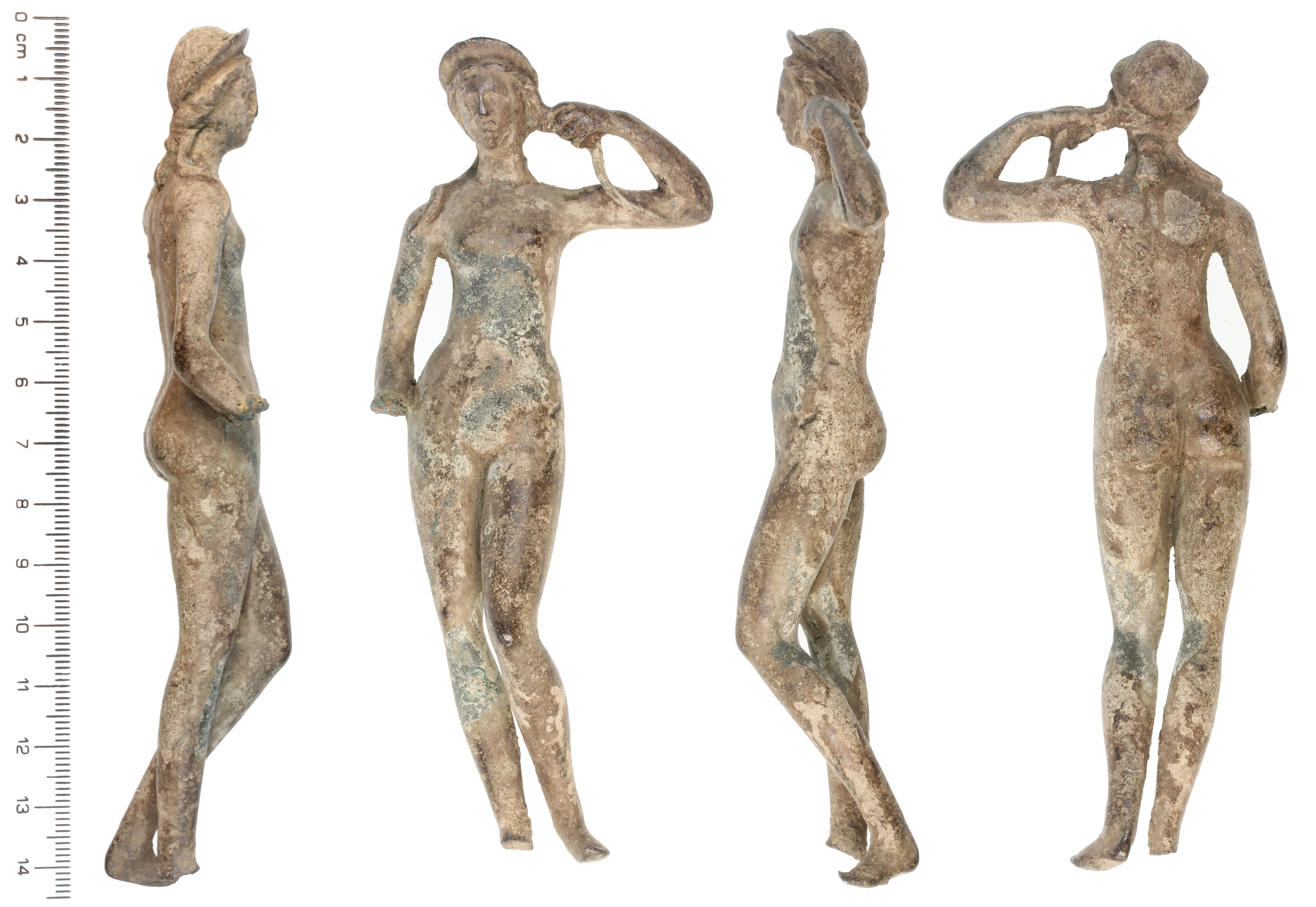
A Romano-British copper-alloy figurine of the goddess Venus, found in Wingham and dated to c. 43 – c. 410

A settlement at Wingham has existed since the Stone Age but only became established as a village in Roman times. The Domesday Book reported that during Saxon times Wingham manor was in possession by the Archbishop of Canterbury. Wingham was the administrative centre of the hundred of Wingham which included Fleet.

In 1286, Archbishop Peckham founded a college in Wingham; many other buildings in Wingham date back to this time, including the Grade II listed 'The Dog Inn' and (also listed) 'The Eight Bells'.

St Mary the Virgin, the present Grade I listed church of Wingham, dates from the early 13th century with fabric dating from the Norman to Victorian eras.

The East Kent Light Railway was built between 1911 and 1917 to serve the new coal mines which were being opened up in the area. The site of the former Wingham Colliery station forming what is now the Grain Harvester's site. Three stations were opened; Wingham Colliery, Wingham Town (now occupied by garages and a scout hut) and Wingham Canterbury Road [adjacent to the Station Farm Shop].

Wingham Colliery never opened into production and the line failed and completely closed to passengers in 1948 with the section north of Eythorne closed to freight in 1951. Plans and some advanced earthworks had been commenced in the 1920s to extend the line from Wingham Canterbury Road Station to Canterbury via Stodmarsh.

The village is also on the Miner's Way Trail. The trail links up the coalfield parishes of East Kent.

== Community ==
Wingham is a village serving some light industry but is mostly a dormitory town for Sandwich and Canterbury. There are shops, an Indian restaurant, and The Anchor, and The Dog Inn public houses.

Recent village developments include Miller Close, a small number of houses built by The Rural Housing Trust, opened officially by Princess Anne in December 2007. There had been proposals to expand the close by building another 20 houses on the field adjacent to the existing homes but these proposals have since been rejected by the local county council and the plans withdrawn by the organisation proposing the plans.

Wingham has a functional fire station which serves the village and surrounding areas. The station itself was originally located in the High Street next to the Red Lion but has since moved to Staple Road. The station is maintained by Kent Fire and Rescue Service and comprises a retained fire crew. Due to the minimal incident activity of the station, there have been suggestions that the station is not required and should be decommissioned to reduce the services operational costs. A recent investment in the station provided a new, improved, fire appliance made by Iveco. This investment has been seen by other, much more active, fire stations operated by Kent Fire and Rescue, such as neighbouring village Aylesham and the town of Sandwich.

The town of Wingham, New South Wales settled in 1841, was named after Wingham in Kent and was originally laid out in a similar way.

Wingham Wildlife Park is a zoo northeast from the village which houses animals such as tigers, snakes, penguins, lemurs, crocodiles, meerkats, tapirs, monkeys, flamingos and wolves.

Bus services run between Sandwich and Canterbury, and to Plucks Gutter and Broadstairs. The nearest National Rail Stations are at Adisham and Aylesham on the Dover-Faversham-London Victoria line.

== Gallery ==
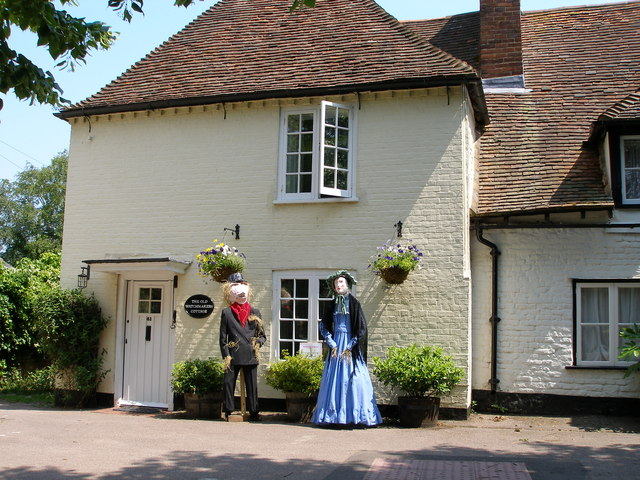
The Old Watchmaker's Cottage complete with scarecrows

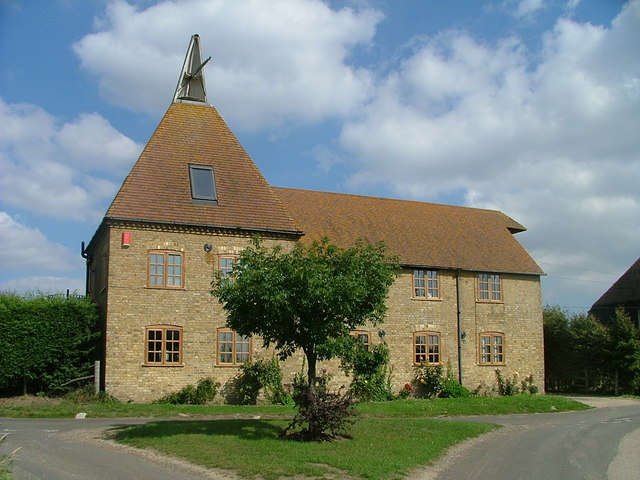
Oast house

== Twin cities/towns ==
- Vert-le-Grand, France
