= Tilmanstone =

Village in Kent, England

Coordinates: 51.215°N 1.295°E

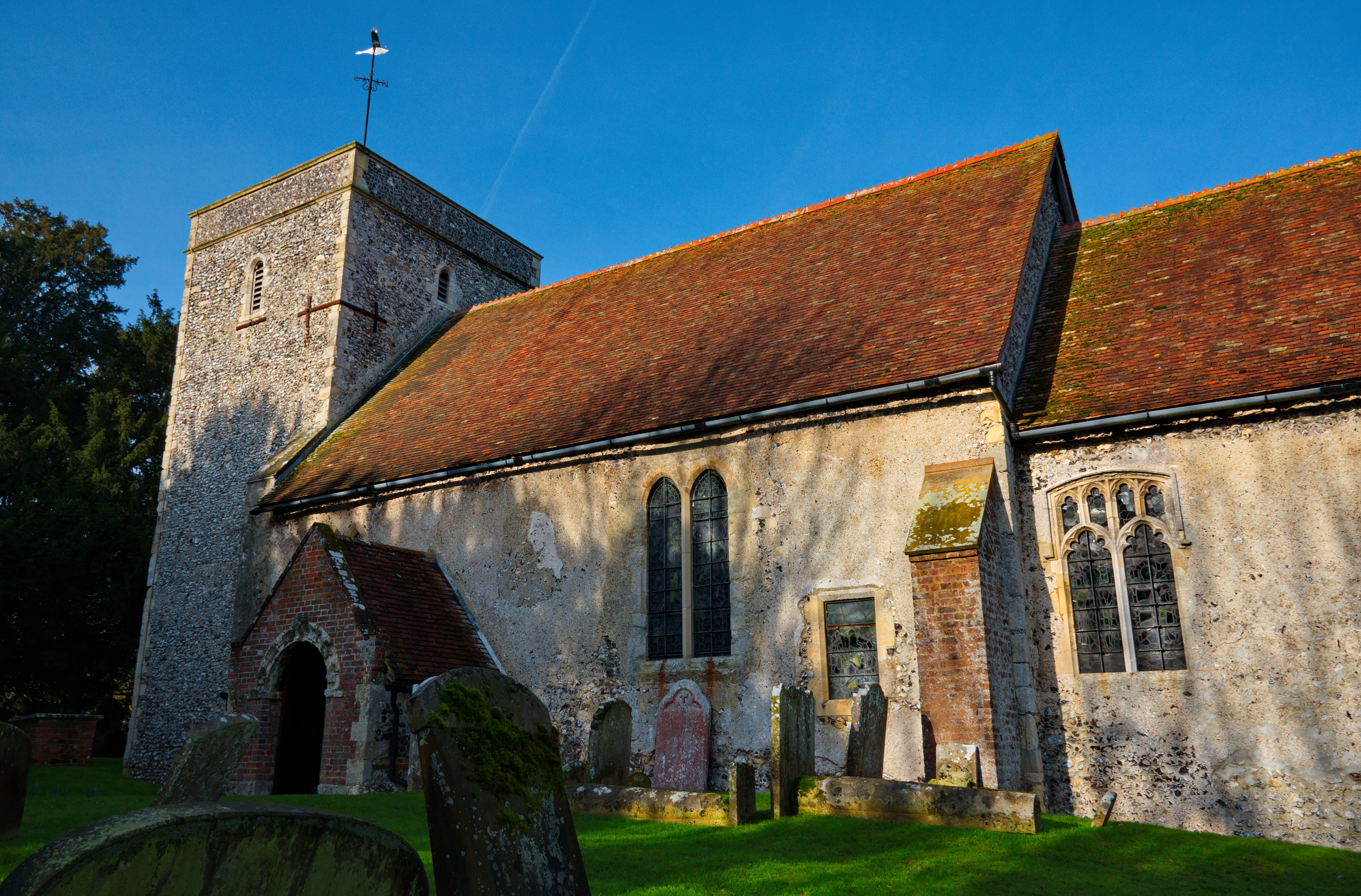
- St Andrew's Church, Tilmanstone

- Location within Kent
- Population: 401 (2011)
- OS grid reference: TR3051
- District: Dover
- Shire county: Kent
- Region: South East
- Country: England
- Sovereign state: United Kingdom
- Post town: DEAL
- Postcode district: CT14
- Dialling code: 01304
- Police: Kent
- Fire: Kent
- Ambulance: South East Coast

Tilmanstone is a small village and civil parish in Kent, in the South East of England, near Eastry, a much bigger and more developed area. Tilmanstone no longer has a village school; however, the independent Northbourne Park School is close to the parish boundary. The name of Tilmanstone has historically been famous for its colliery, although it is located in the village of Eythorne, operated from 1906 to 1986 as one of the four main pits of the Kent coalfield. The population taken at the 2011 Census also included that of the nearby hamlet of Ashley.

== History ==
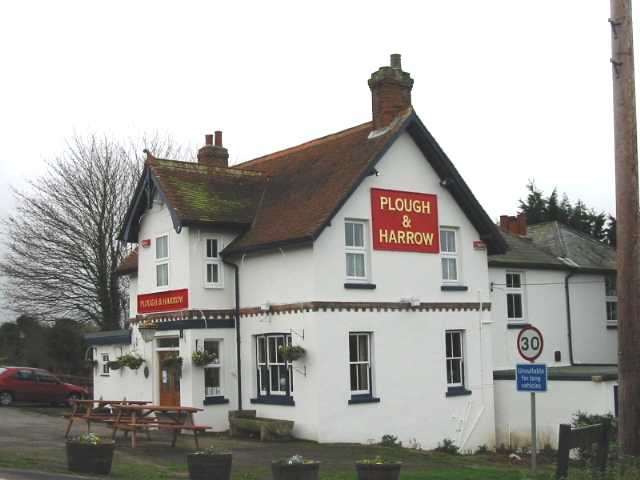
The Plough & Harrow public house

The parish church of St Andrew dates back to the mid-11th century and is made of flint, with later stone and brick sections. The church also includes the Tilmanstone Brass, which recognized Richard Fogge (c. 1482, a descendant of politician Thomas Fogge) and features a point perspective with three-dimensional figures, something that at the time was only popular in Florence. The yew tree in the churchyard has been dated to more than 1,200 years, likely to be older than anything else in the village.

The manors of Dane Court, South Court, and North Court form the foundation of the ancient village. The Kent Archaeological Society transcription of 1922 included the North Court and South Court Manor Court Rolls held in the Library of Lambeth Palace. These rolls cover the years 1753–1789.

== Mining ==
The Tilmanstone Colliery was located in the village of Eythorne, on the ridge to the west. The mine was opened in 1906 and was modernised in 1947 surviving until closure in 1986.

An accident in 1913 killed three men and destroyed the pumping system, causing the mine to flood and work was abandoned for nine months. The site was connected to the East Kent Railway (EKR) in 1915 and coal first brought to the surface in March 1916. Tilmanstone Colliery Halt railway station served the pit between 1916 and 1948. An accident at the pit on 27 February 1931 resulted in Sydney William Padfield being awarded a bronze Edward Medal, the only one awarded in the Kent Coalfield. An aerial ropeway was built in 1930 to link the pit with Dover Harbour; this included tunnelling through the cliff at Dover to deliver the coal to a 5,000 ton bunker at the harbour. It was little used after 1935, and was dismantled in 1954. In 1945, the workforce was 914, with 631 being employed sub-surface and 283 above. The colliery closed in 1988, having produced over 20,000,000 tons of coal. A system of tokens was used in the pithead baths and canteen and a lamp check was operated, in common with the majority of pits. All buildings have been demolished.

Shafts sunk

- No 1. 1,559 feet (475 m)
- No 2. 2,477 feet (755 m)
- No 3. 2,077 feet (633 m)

Tilmanstone is on the Miner's Way Trail, linking the coalfield parishes of East Kent.
