= Lydden =

Village in Kent, England

Coordinates: 51.1642°N 1.234°E

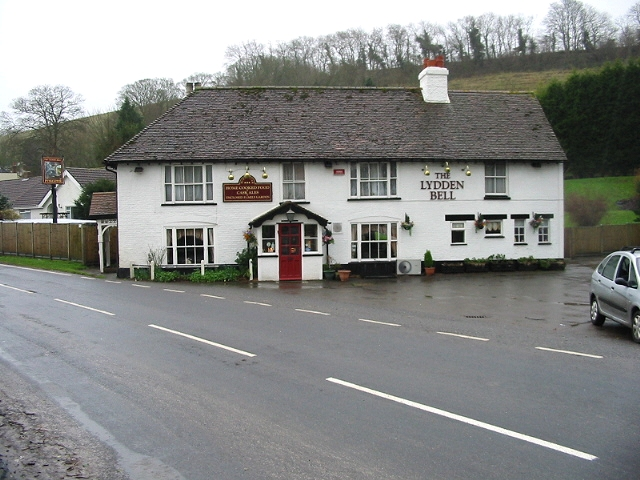
- The Lydden Bell pub, Lydden

- Location within Kent
- Population: 673 (2011)
- OS grid reference: TR262455
- District: Dover
- Shire county: Kent
- Region: South East
- Country: England
- Sovereign state: United Kingdom
- Post town: Dover
- Postcode district: CT15
- Dialling code: 01304
- Police: Kent
- Fire: Kent
- Ambulance: South East Coast
- UK Parliament: Dover and Deal

Lydden is a civil parish and small village in the Dover district of Kent, England. The Lydden Race Circuit is located between here and Wootton to the west of the village. Lydden village consists of a triangle of 3 roads: Canterbury Road (part of the old A2 running between Dover, Canterbury and London), Stonehall and Church Lane.

Lydden is set in a steep sided valley landscape, with grazing pasture and pockets of woodland along the valley side facing north west, and the extensive Lydden and Temple Ewell Downs National Nature Reserve facing south west. The NNR is famous for its chalk grassland habitat and species including the adonis blue butterfly.

== Governance ==
Lydden is part of the electoral ward called Lydden and Temple Ewell. The population of this ward at the 2011 census was 2,342.
