= Betteshanger =

Village in Kent, England

Coordinates: 51.225°N 1.32°E

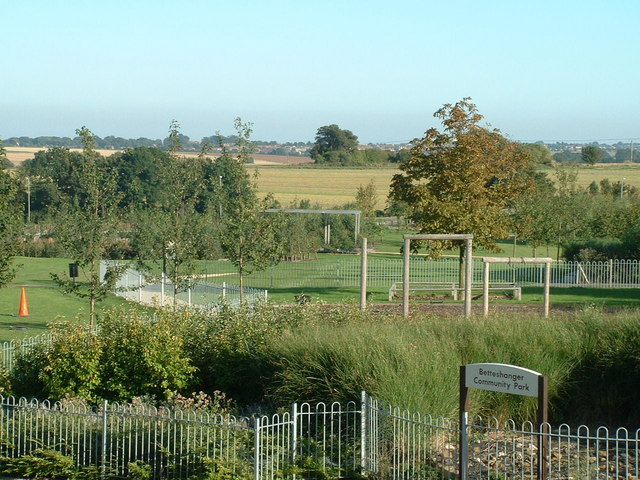
- Betteshanger Park

- Location within Kent
- OS grid reference: TR3352
- Civil parish: Northbourne
- District: Dover
- Shire county: Kent
- Region: South East
- Country: England
- Sovereign state: United Kingdom
- Post town: Deal
- Postcode district: CT14
- Dialling code: 01304
- Police: Kent
- Fire: Kent
- Ambulance: South East Coast

Betteshanger is a village and former civil parish. now in the parish of Northbourne, in the Dover district, in east Kent, UK, near Deal. It gave its name to the largest of the four chief collieries of the Kent coalfield. In 1931 the parish had a population of 55. On 1 April 1935 the parish was abolished and merged with Northbourne.

== Before the coal mine ==
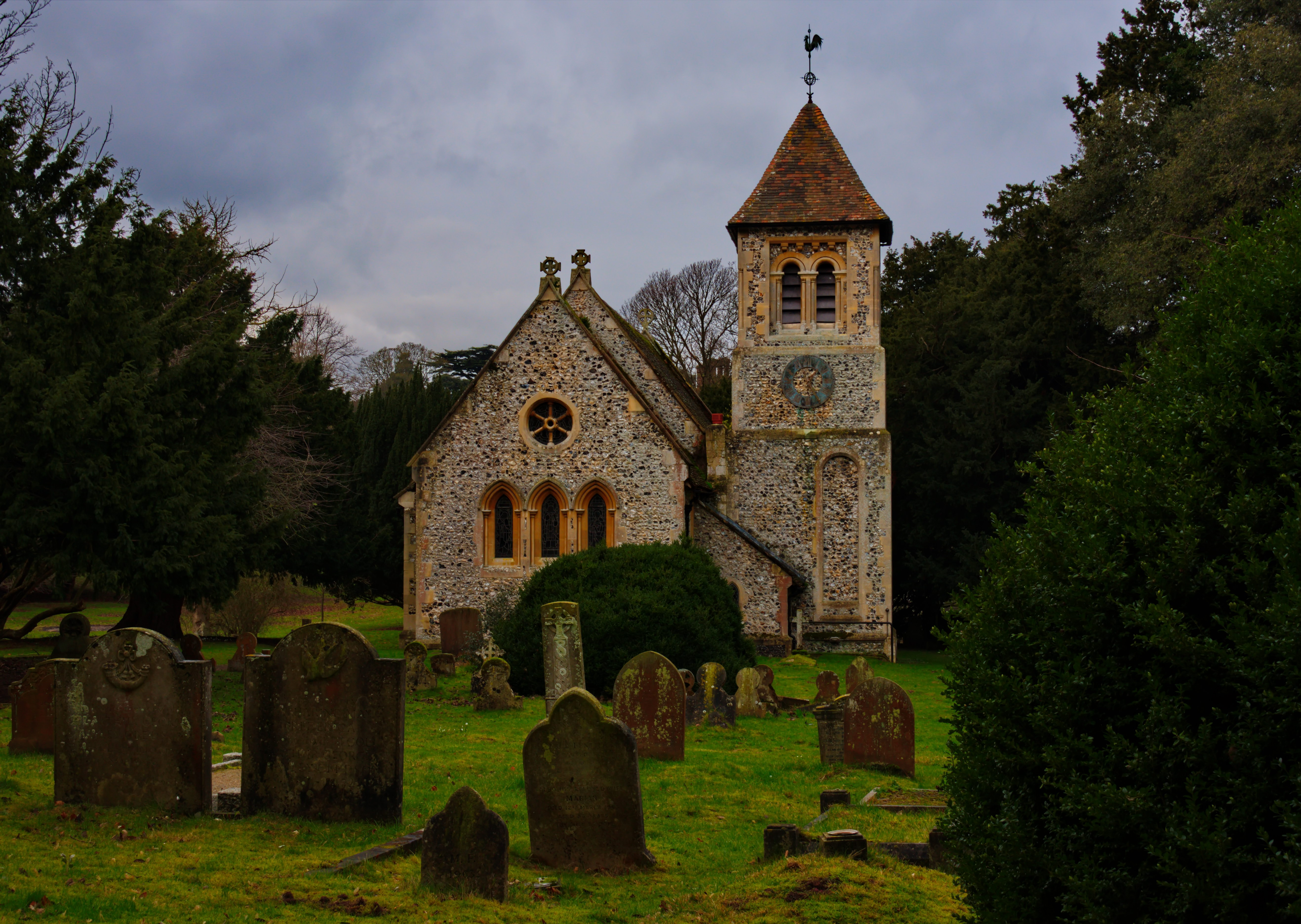
St Mary's Church, Betteshanger

Betteshanger parish (with variation 'Betleshangre') has existed at least since Domesday times. It remained a small scattered parish until the advent of the Kent Coalfield. St Mary's Church sits almost alone in woodland in the centre of the parish. At 'Little Betteshanger' a cluster of houses surround Betteshanger Farm and are very close to Northbourne Primary School.

== Mining in Betteshanger ==
Betteshanger Colliery opened in the late 1920s and was the largest of the Kent collieries. Miners from other coalfields travelled to Deal in the hope of finding work at the new pit, and many lodging houses, cafes and pubs in Deal put up signs saying "no miners" owing to fear of the arrival of the often dirty men who spoke very different dialects. It had two shafts of almost 2,300 feet, plaques can still be seen where the shafts were once sunk. The colliery was served by a railway branch which left the main line between Deal & Sandwich.

Betteshanger had a tradition of union militancy. Many of the miners who moved to Kent to work at Betteshanger had been blacklisted in their home areas after the 1926 strike, so there was a high proportion of "hardline union men". It was the first pit to come out on strike during the Second World War and took active part in the miners' strikes of 1969, 1972, 1974, and 1984/85.

A sit-in was staged at the colliery in 1984 and those involved were sacked for trespass. The Kent Area's NUM initially refused to return to work until those sacked were reinstated and continued to picket the rest of the country after the NUM's national executive had voted to return to work, so Betteshanger was actually the last pit in Britain to return to work after the strike.

Thereafter, Betteshanger became known for the brutality with which strikebreakers were treated. Posters had gone up in the village with photographs and names of the 30 men who had broken the strike. It was the last Kent colliery to close, closing for good in 1989.

The village is also on the Miner's Way Trail that links up the coalfield parishes of East Kent.

== Village layout ==
The miners' houses were laid out in three streets: Circular Road, Northway and Broad Lane. Circular Road, often known simply as 'the circle' is in fact oval in shape and is a one-way street. Houses have even numbers on inside of the circle, and odd on the outside. Northway connects the circle with the rest of the world and is a short two-way street. As a road Broad Lane predates the coal mine and has miners' houses on just one side. Additionally, the former village shop is now a domestic dwelling and although numbered as part of Circular Road, sits on an unnamed stub-road which used to serve as the entrance to the colliery itself.

== Betteshanger Park Development ==
With support from South East England Development Agency (SEEDA), as part of the National Coalfields Programme (NCP) a children's play area, including play equipment and a skateboard ramp, and more recently an industrial park, have opened on the site of the former colliery. Betteshanger Park has also been developed on a former spoil tip (on the north of the site). Plans current in 2011 for Betteshanger Industrial Park were the proposal from Hadlow College to set up the agricultural centre, creating more than 1,000 jobs. Local opposition to this proposal wanted to turn the site into a charitable trust with the development of free enterprise formulas and continued growth of the site.

== Betteshanger Sustainable Parks ==
Launched on 6 November 2013 at the House of Commons, this £40m scheme will re-develop the site of the former colliery and create approximately 1,000 jobs in the local area.

It is planned that Betteshanger Sustainable Parks, a scheme bringing together Hadlow College, Dover District Council, the Homes and Communities Agency and Kent County Council will generate green energy together with a Mining Heritage Museum, Visitor Centre and Sustainable Education Centre. In total, the Betteshanger Sustainable Education and Business Incubation Centre will provide 2,000 square metres of internal space and provide an incubation service for fledgling businesses. The Business and Commercial Park will comprise 6,700 square metres of internal space.

The development which, prior to launch in November 2013, took four years of preparation is a UK first, and aims to help regenerate Dover district, as well as the wider East Kent communities. It is planned that the project will start on site in summer 2015 and open in spring 2016. The Kent Mining Museum is scheduled to open in summer 2016

== Betteshanger Summer School ==
Betteshanger occupies an important place in the history and development of organic and biodynamic farming. It was the bridge between these two forms of agriculture. The 'Betteshanger Summer School and Conference on Biodynamic Farming' was held in July 1939. It was the first biodynamic agriculture conference to be held in Britain. Ehrenfried Pfeiffer travelled from Switzerland to be the lead presenter at the summer school which was held at the farm of Lord Northbourne. The following year Northbourne presented and expanded on these ideas for a British audience in his book 'Look to the Land' in which he introduced the term 'organic farming'.
