= 2023 Dover District Council election =

2023 UK local government election

- 4 May 2023

All 32 seats to Dover District Council 17 seats needed for a majority

	First party	Second party	Third party
Leader	Kevin Mills	Trevor Bartlett
Party	Labour	Conservative	Independent
Last election	12 seats, 29.0%	19 seats, 43.7%	1 seat, 5.6%
Seats won	17	14	1
Seat change	▲5	▼5	Steady
Popular vote	22,011	20,449	2,746
Percentage	40.7%	37.8%	5.1%
Swing	▲11.7%	▼5.9%	▼0.5%
- Winner of each seat at the 2023 Dover District Council election
Leader before election
Trevor Bartlett
Conservative
Leader after election
Kevin Mills
Labour

The 2023 Dover District Council election took place on 4 May 2023 to elect members of Dover District Council in Kent, England. This was the same day as other local elections.

== Summary ==
The council was under Conservative majority control prior to the election. Labour won a majority of the seats at the election, giving them control of the council for the first time in twenty years. The Labour group leader, Kevin Mills, was appointed leader of the council at the subsequent annual council meeting on 17 May 2023.

=== Election result ===
2023 Dover District Council election
Party	Candidates	Seats	Gains	Losses	Net gain/loss	Seats %	Votes %	Votes	+/−
Labour	31	17	5	0	▲5	53.1	40.7	22,011	+11.7
Conservative	32	14	1	6	▼5	43.8	37.8	20,449	–5.9
Independent	8	1	1	1	Steady	3.1	5.1	2,746	–0.5
Liberal Democrats	12	0	0	0	Steady	0.0	6.4	3,474	–1.6
Green	11	0	0	0	Steady	0.0	9.1	4,929	–2.4
Heritage	1	0	0	0	Steady	0.0	0.4	230	N/A
Reform	1	0	0	0	Steady	0.0	0.4	205	N/A

== Ward results ==
The Statement of Persons Nominated, which details the candidates standing in each ward, was released by Dover District Council following the close of nominations on 5 April 2023. The results for each ward were as follows:

=== Alkham and Capel-le-Ferne ===
Alkham and Capel-le-Ferne
Party	Candidate	Votes	%	±%
Conservative	Martin Hibbert*	428	49.7	–2.4
Labour	Bettine Walters	274	31.8	+20.2
Liberal Democrats	Howard Evans	160	18.6	–17.7
Majority		154	17.9	
Turnout		879	33.06	–0.6
Rejected ballots		17	1.9	
Registered electors		2,659		
Conservative hold		Swing	▼11.3	

=== Buckland ===
Buckland (2 seats)
Party	Candidate	Votes	%	±%
Labour	Kevin Mills*	692	61.7	+20.6
Labour	Charlotte Zosseder*	615	54.8	+17.0
Conservative	Jane Carrole	373	33.2	+1.6
Conservative	Paul Reynolds	350	31.2	+3.9
Majority		242	21.6	
Turnout		1,122	21.22	–2.1
Rejected ballots		21	1.9	
Registered electors		5,288		
Labour hold				
Labour hold				

=== Aylesham, Eythorne and Shepherdswell ===
Aylesham, Eythorne and Shepherdswell (3 seats)
Party	Candidate	Votes	%	±%
Labour	Charles Woodgate*	1,423	54.1	+17.5
Labour	Jamie Pout	1,410	53.6	+13.7
Labour	Shehrazade Mamjan	1,260	47.9	+13.0
Conservative	MaryAnn Richardson	630	23.9	–12.4
Conservative	Roger Livesey	599	22.8	–8.6
Conservative	Arun Mathew	593	22.5	N/A
Independent	Derek Garrity	531	20.2	N/A
Liberal Democrats	Barbara Sim	319	12.1	N/A
Independent	Graham Armstrong	288	10.9	N/A
Majority		630	23.9	
Turnout		2,631	30.35	–0.7
Rejected ballots		29	1.1	
Registered electors		8,669		
Labour hold				
Labour hold				
Labour gain from Independent				

=== Dover Downs and River ===
Dover Downs and River (2 seats)
Party	Candidate	Votes	%	±%
Conservative	David Beaney*	845	40.6	–9.4
Conservative	Mark Rose*	761	36.6	–10.5
Labour	Benjamin Cosin	680	32.7	+6.3
Green	Ashley Tanton	526	25.3	N/A
Liberal Democrats	Penelope James	525	25.2	–2.0
Liberal Democrats	Adrian Walker-Smith	383	18.4	–4.4
Majority		81	3.9	
Turnout		2,080	39.08	+4.0
Rejected ballots		15	0.7	
Registered electors		5,323		
Conservative hold				
Conservative hold				

=== Eastry Rural ===
Eastry Rural (2 seats)
Party	Candidate	Votes	%	±%
Conservative	Nicholas Kenton*	776	41.4	–6.1
Conservative	Stephen Manion*	698	37.2	–8.2
Green	Sarah Waite-Gleave	645	34.4	–10.7
Green	Peter Findley	615	32.8	N/A
Labour	David Pestell	380	20.3	–10.5
Labour	Geoffrey Hack	369	19.7	N/A
Liberal Democrats	Cheri Pennington	103	5.5	N/A
Majority		53	2.8	
Turnout		1,875	39.13	+4.2
Rejected ballots		5	0.3	
Registered electors		4,792		
Conservative hold				
Conservative hold				

=== Guston, Kingsdown and St. Margaret's-at-Cliffe ===
Guston, Kingsdown and St. Margaret's-at-Cliffe (2 seats)
Party	Candidate	Votes	%	±%
Conservative	Martin Bates*	960	40.1	–12.0
Conservative	Oliver Richardson*	941	39.3	–2.8
Green	John Lonsdale	758	31.7	+7.8
Labour	Margaret Cosin	690	28.8	+9.4
Labour	Brynley Hawkins	604	25.3	+10.0
Liberal Democrats	John Gosling	262	11.0	N/A
Heritage	Sylvia Laidlow-Petersen	230	9.6	N/A
Majority		183	7.7	
Turnout		2,392	41.33	+2.2
Rejected ballots		6	0.3	
Registered electors		5,788		
Conservative hold				
Conservative hold				

=== Little Stour and Ashstone ===
Little Stour and Ashstone (2 seats)
Party	Candidate	Votes	%	±%
Conservative	Trevor Bartlett*	1,103	54.4	–3.5
Conservative	Martin Porter	864	42.6	–11.3
Labour	John Featherstone	428	21.1	+7.5
Liberal Democrats	Russell Timpson	401	19.8	+3.9
Labour	Gillian Weaver	360	17.8	N/A
Green	Jennifer Mathlin	353	17.4	–8.9
Green	June Sharpe	289	14.3	N/A
Majority		436	21.5	
Turnout		2,027	35.46	–2.0
Rejected ballots		8	0.4	
Registered electors		5,717		
Conservative hold				
Conservative hold				

=== Maxton and Elms Vale ===
Maxton and Elms Vale
Party	Candidate	Votes	%	±%
Labour	Michael Nee	398	40.7	+0.1
Independent	Graham Wanstall	288	29.4	N/A
Conservative	Callum Warriner	193	19.7	–25.0
Green	Nicolas Shread	100	10.2	N/A
Majority		110	11.2	
Turnout		994	33.72	+4.6
Rejected ballots		15	1.5	
Registered electors		2,948		
Labour gain from Conservative		Swing	N/A	

=== Middle Deal ===
Middle Deal (2 seats)
Party	Candidate	Votes	%	±%
Labour	Stacey Blair	1,128	56.8	+24.9
Labour	David Cronk*	1,035	52.1	+15.2
Conservative	Trevor Bond*	710	35.8	–3.4
Conservative	Susan Davenport	563	28.3	–4.6
Liberal Democrats	Christine Headley	252	12.7	+1.9
Majority		325	16.4	
Turnout		1,986	35.51	+5.0
Rejected ballots		22	1.1	
Registered electors		5,593		
Labour gain from Conservative				
Labour hold				

=== Mill Hill ===
Mill Hill (2 seats)
Party	Candidate	Votes	%	±%
Labour	Helen Williams*	1,074	55.6	+15.5
Labour	Jeff Loffman	1,018	52.7	+15.2
Conservative	David Hawkes*	519	26.8	–3.2
Green	Christine Oliver	496	25.7	–3.1
Conservative	Chris Burwash	472	24.4	–1.9
Majority		499	25.8	
Turnout		1,933	32.82	+2.7
Rejected ballots		14	0.7	
Registered electors		5,890		
Labour hold				
Labour hold				

=== North Deal ===
North Deal (2 seats)
Party	Candidate	Votes	%	±%
Labour	Daniel Parks	1,359	58.3	+20.7
Labour	Susan Beer*	1,357	58.2	+15.8
Conservative	Peter Jull*	896	38.5	–0.7
Conservative	John Morgan	729	31.3	–6.9
Majority		461	19.8	
Turnout		2,330	40.84	+3.6
Rejected ballots		45	1.9	
Registered electors		5,705		
Labour gain from Conservative				
Labour hold				

=== Sandwich ===
Sandwich (2 seats)
Party	Candidate	Votes	%	±%
Independent	Mark Moorhouse	945	45.9	N/A
Conservative	Daniel Friend*	823	40.0	–2.8
Conservative	Harry Sampson	701	34.1	–8.2
Liberal Democrats	Martyn Pennington	442	21.5	+3.5
Labour	Paul Louis	336	16.3	–0.7
Labour	Martin Garside	333	16.2	+1.0
Majority		122	5.9	
Turnout		2,058	39.10	–1.2
Rejected ballots		16	0.8	
Registered electors		5,263		
Independent gain from Conservative				
Conservative hold				

=== St. Radigund's ===
St. Radigund's (2 seats)
Party	Candidate	Votes	%	±%
Labour	Lynne Wright	464	46.5	+3.7
Labour	Gordon Cowan	433	43.4	+11.2
Independent	James Defriend	339	34.0	N/A
Conservative	Andy Calder	234	23.5	–3.8
Conservative	Brenda Collins	233	23.4	–1.0
Majority		94	9.4	
Turnout		997	21.78	–0.6
Rejected ballots		23	2.3	
Registered electors		4,578		
Labour hold				
Labour hold				

=== Tower Hamlets ===
Tower Hamlets
Party	Candidate	Votes	%	±%
Labour Co-op	Pamela Brivio*	465	75.1	+27.9
Conservative	Ann Jenner	154	24.9	+4.4
Majority		311	50.2	
Turnout		634	22.27	–1.6
Rejected ballots		15	2.4	
Registered electors		2,847		
Labour Co-op hold		Swing	▲11.8	

=== Town and Castle ===
Town and Castle (2 seats)
Party	Candidate	Votes	%	±%
Labour	Susan Hill	616	42.5	+14.4
Labour	Edward Biggs*	600	41.4	+18.5
Conservative	Richard Jeacock	423	29.2	–1.1
Conservative	Samantha Reynolds	390	26.9	±0.0
Green	Rebecca Sawbridge	238	16.4	–4.2
Independent	Kayleigh Marsh	207	14.3	N/A
Independent	Ashley Payne	122	8.4	N/A
Liberal Democrats	Carolynne O'Donoghue	83	5.7	N/A
Independent	Brian Philp	26	1.8	N/A
Majority		177	12.2	
Turnout		1,451	25.40	–1.5
Rejected ballots		23	1.6	
Registered electors		5,713		
Labour gain from Conservative				
Labour hold				

=== Walmer ===
Walmer (2 seats)
Party	Candidate	Votes	%	±%
Conservative	Christopher Vinson*	1,023	41.7	–4.3
Conservative	Derek Murphy*	999	40.7	–0.8
Green	Michael Eddy	726	29.6	+2.6
Labour	Amanda Holloway	685	27.9	+8.6
Labour	Benet Bano	656	26.7	+9.0
Liberal Democrats	Richard Blackwell	406	16.5	+6.3
Majority		273	11.1	
Turnout		2,454	42.74	+2.3
Rejected ballots		34	1.4	
Registered electors		5,742		
Conservative hold				
Conservative hold				

=== Whitfield ===
Whitfield (2 seats)
Party	Candidate	Votes	%	±%
Conservative	Roger Knight	748	47.9	–8.5
Conservative	James Back*	718	46.0	–5.2
Labour	Claire Hill	462	29.6	+7.9
Labour	Ruth Harris-Small	407	26.1	+7.5
Reform	George McGillivray	205	13.1	N/A
Green	Stephanie Wallace	183	11.7	–4.9
Liberal Democrats	Robert Hope	138	8.8	–7.5
Majority		256	16.4	
Turnout		1,560	29.95	+0.6
Rejected ballots		2	0.1	
Registered electors		5,209		
Conservative hold				
Conservative hold				

== Changes 2023–2027 ==
- In January 2025, Labour councillors Charles Woodgate and Shehrazade Mamjan (both Aylesham, Eythorne and Shepherdswell) left the Labour group; Woodgate joined the Conservatives and Mamjan sat as an independent. The council fell into no overall control, with Labour continuing as a minority administration.
- In April 2025, deputy leader Jamie Pout (Aylesham, Eythorne and Shepherdswell) was expelled from the Labour Party and sat as an independent; Stacey Blair (Middle Deal) resigned from the party in solidarity. Charlotte Zosseder (Buckland) also left Labour in solidarity with Pout.
- In July 2026 the government confirmed that Kent and Medway would be reorganised into four unitary authorities from April 2028, replacing Dover District Council. In September 2026 the reorganisation was paused, with the May 2027 elections to go ahead on existing council boundaries.

=== By-elections ===
==== Guston, Kingsdown and St Margaret's-at-Cliffe ====
The Guston, Kingsdown and St Margaret's-at-Cliffe by-election was triggered by the resignation of Conservative councillor Martin Bates for personal reasons.

Guston, Kingsdown and St Margaret's-at-Cliffe by-election, 27 August 2026
Party	Candidate	Votes	%	±%
Green	Ingrid Dodd	767	28.8	+2.7
Reform	James Defriend	733	27.5	New
Conservative	David Hawkes	456	17.1	−16.0
Labour	Steve Wisbey	389	14.6	−9.2
Restore	Jez Hermer	284	10.7	New
Independent	Graham Wanstall	35	1.3	New
Majority		34	1.3	N/A
Turnout		2,668	45	+3.8
Rejected ballots		4	0.1	
Registered electors		5,919		
Green gain from Conservative		Swing	+9.4	
