= Yorkletts =

Village in Kent, England

- Hamlet
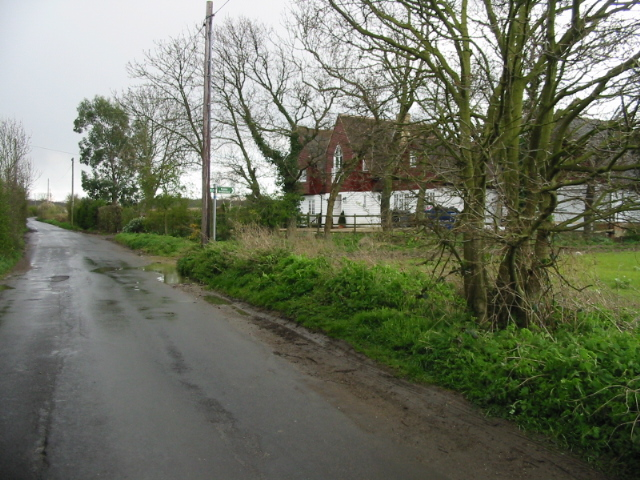

- Location within Kent
- Population: 388
- OS grid reference: TR177681
- District: Canterbury
- Shire county: Kent
- Region: South East
- Country: England
- Sovereign state: United Kingdom
- Post town: Whitstable
- Postcode district: CT5
- Dialling code: 01227
- Police: Kent
- Fire: Kent
- Ambulance: South East Coast
- UK Parliament: Rosie Duffield

Yorkletts is a hamlet in the Canterbury district, in the county of Kent, England. It is 2.5 miles north-east of Whitstable and 5.68 miles west of Faversham. The hamlet is included in the Seasalter ward of the Canterbury City Council.

== Etymology ==
Yorkletts derives from the word Yokelet which means, ‘a small farm that requires one yoke of oxen to till it.’

== Crime ==
Compared to the national average, Yorkletts ranks below in crime. There is 56.2 crimes per 1’000 people, Dargate road became a notable hotspot. Anti-social behaviour is the most commonly reported crime in the area.

== Travel ==
Yorkletts has 4 local bus stations found along Plumpudding Lane and Barn close operated by Stagecoach South East. Bus routes are 915, 913, 638. Yorkletts has some local amenities and small local businesses. Along the major Thanet Way that cuts through the hamlet are large businesses such as Subway, Starbucks and Shell. Yorkletts has no local school and is reliant on the nearby Whitstable (2.5 miles) and Faversham (5.68 miles)

== History ==
During a walking assessment for the Thanet Way, late Roman to early Medieval pottery and tiles was uncovered east of Seasalter Lane near Yorkletts. During the 17th and 18th century, The Seasalter Company used a route from the coast to Pink Farm, Yorkletts to smuggle in brandy and tobacco into larger markets. Between the early to mid 19th century, Yorkletts farmhouse was constructed, and was resided by the Curling family.

A refuse tip was established in Yorkletts for industrial, household, commercial and inert waste from 1937 and 1982. The tip ran on a narrow valley that opened into the marshes, and was 100 yards away from 2 households. Between 1950 and 1970, the nearby ancient woodland was felled to make agricultural land and only 7 hectares remain of original ancient woodlands. Bus service in Yorkletts was cancelled during the Winter of 1962 due to the harsh snow drift. During 1974, agricultural land was purchased by a Essex based firm to sell to Irish Travellers as Leisure spots.

In the late 1990s, plans for a large tip by stretching Lamberhurst Farm to Dargate caused large protests due to concerns of pollination and proximity to resdients. Following the 2500 residents that wrote to Kent County Council against the plans, local Conservative MP Julian Brazier wrote to the KKC in opposition. The protest was known as ‘Stop the Dargate Dump‘ and the protesters were known as Anti-Dumpers.

== Natural History ==
In the Kent Habitat Survey 2012, Yorkletts sat upon improved grassland, with broadleaved yew on the south west. On the top right of the hamlet, where the major Thanet Road cut, recorded a neutral grassland patch on the north east. The character of the land splits the hamlet in a Northwest Greater Thames Estuary and Southeast North Kent Plains. The main geology is clay, London clay, and no rock drift.

Victory Woods

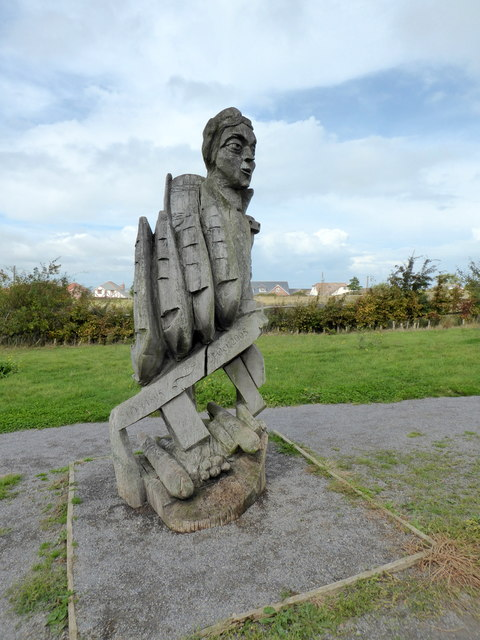
Sculpture of Nelson, Victory Wood

Victory Woods is an Area of Outstanding Natural Beauty consisting of 140 hectares of land. The area currently owned by The Woodland Trust. In 2004, Victory Woods was purchased by The Woodland Trust to connect the forest to the surrounding areas of Blean Woods and Ellenden Woods.

Victory Woods was one of 27 woodlands established as part of Trafalgar Woods Project. Made in celebration of the bicentaury since the Battle Of Trafalgar, the area pays homage to the battle. A footprint the size and shape of HMS Victory size is marked out on posts and a path allows visitors to walk the distance of a cannonball shot from the ship.

There are 4 main entrances. Just off Dargate road, the first entrance is a kissing gate, with a surfaced path constructed for disabled visitors. The second entrance sits at the northern boundary, with an all access kissing gate for its visitors. The third entrance lies south west of Victory Woods, just off Dargate road and by a pedestrian squeeze gap. The fourth entrance is south east accessed by a kissing gate. Most the land sits on improved, arable grasslands with broadleaved woodlands. In the spring of 2021, the Butterfly Conservation Trust found caterpillars of the believed to be extinct Heath Fritillary Butterfly. There has been 30-40 bee species documented, including rare species. like the shrill carder bee.
