= 1942 Betteshanger miners' strike =

1942 Mine-worker's strike in Kent, England

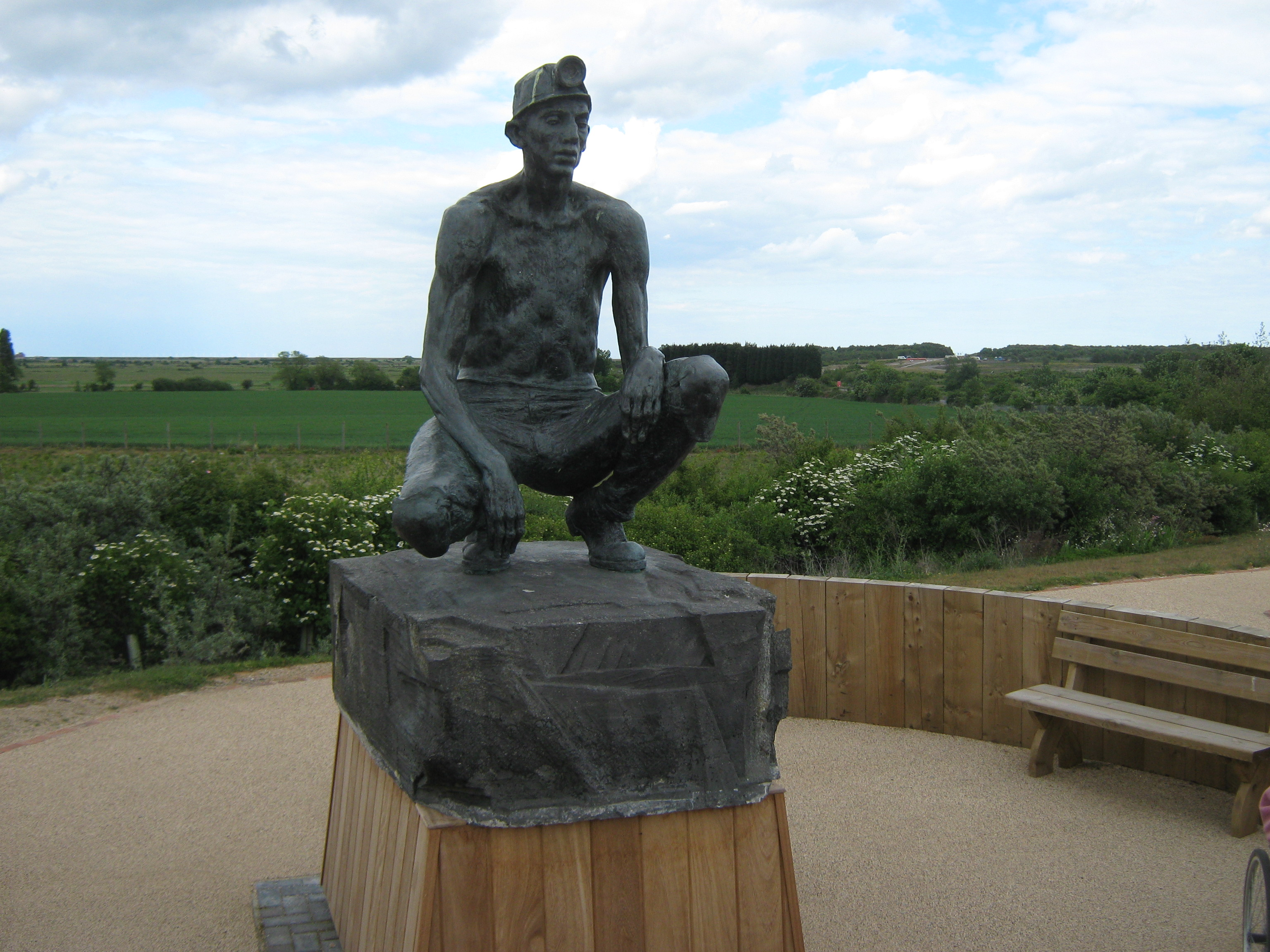
A statue of a miner at the now-closed coal mine

A miners' strike took place in January 1942 at the Betteshanger colliery in Kent, England. The strike had its origins in a switch to a new coalface, No. 2. This face was much narrower and harder to work than the previous face and outputs were reduced. The miners proved unable to meet management production quotas and the mine owners refused to pay the previously agreed minimum daily wage, alleging deliberate slow working. An arbitrator called in to review the dispute ruled that the quotas were achievable. The miners disagreed and went on strike from 9 January.

Under wartime regulations, Order 1305, striking was illegal unless the matter had been referred to the Ministry of Labour and National Service for settlement. Prosecutions were made against the strikers; three union officials were imprisoned and 1,085 men fined. The prosecutions hardened the strikers' attitudes and after the strike entered its third week the government began negotiations. A settlement was reached to reinstate the minimum wage and for the men to return to work on 29 January. The imprisoned men received a royal pardon on 2 February and the fines were remitted in July 1943.

== Background ==
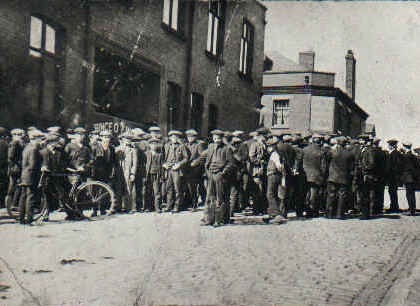
Miners at Tylesley during the 1926 strike

In order to maintain production outputs during the Second World War the British government passed the Conditions of Employment and National Arbitration Order 1940, commonly referred to as Order 1305. This made it an offence for workers to go on strike unless the Ministry of Labour and National Service failed to refer a labour dispute for settlement by a National Arbitration Tribunal within 21 days. The order had the support of the ministry's National Joint Consultative Committee which included representation from the British Employers' Confederation and the Trades Union Congress.

Betteshanger was the largest colliery in the Kent Coalfield, employing thousands of miners working a seam some 1,500 feet (460 m) below ground level. The mine had a reputation for militancy as many of the miners who took up jobs there after its opening in 1927 had been blacklisted from mines in other parts of the country for their actions during the 1926 general strike. The miners had held a strike in 1938 over the treatment of young employees at the colliery.

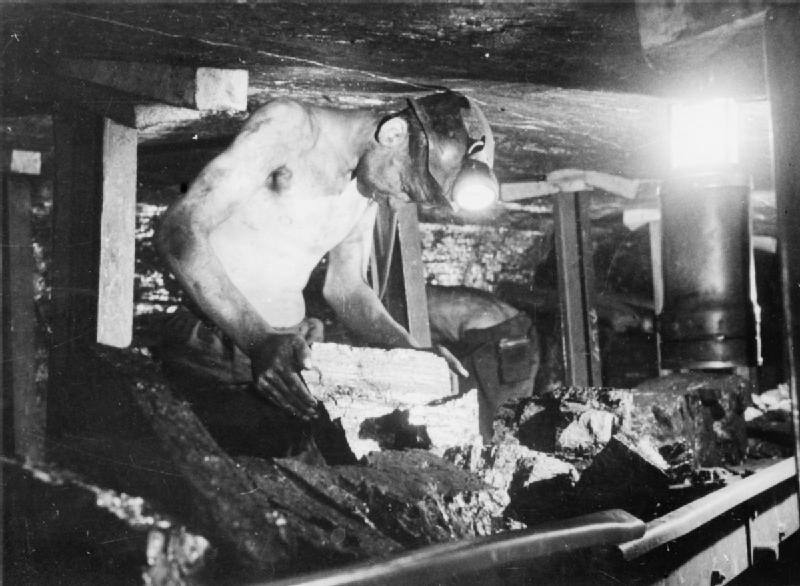
A miner working in a narrow coal seam, Britain 1942

The 1942 strike had its origins in a decision by the mineowners to open up a new coalface, known as No. 2 Face, in November 1941. It proved difficult to achieve the mine manager's output quota of 4 long tons (4.1 t) per day from the new coalface. The management claimed this was because the miners were deliberately working slowly but the miners claimed it was because of difficult working conditions. The coal seam at No. 2 Face was unusually variable and working conditions there changed on a weekly basis. The miners claimed that at times the seam was as little as 2 feet (0.61 m) high, requiring the men to work on their knees in a confined space. There were also complaints about air quality and faulty equipment, which the miners claimed cost an hour each shift to repair. The miners alleged that the management had started work on the difficult No.2 Face to allow the more productive and easier to work Eastern Face to be closed off. This was allegedly to save the Eastern Face for exploitation after the war, when government subsidies would be withdrawn.

The mine managers refused to accept the arguments put forward by the miners and took action; instead of paying the minimum wage, which had been set by agreements dating to 1933, the management stated they would only pay a piecework rate for the coal actually produced. The miners' union disputed this but failed to make progress and the union branch president and secretary both resigned over the matter. The Board of Trade's Department of Mines agreed to arbitrate in the dispute and sent Sir Charles Doughty to decide on the matter. Doughty was a veteran arbitrator and solicitor with experience in coal mining, though only in the north-west of England. Doughty ruled, on 19 December, that the 4-ton target for No.2 Face was achievable and that the rate per ton paid by the mine was generous. He did recommend that an additional bonus of 1 shilling 1 penny (£0.05) be paid for coal produced from No. 2 Face in recognition of the difficult working conditions.

== Strike ==
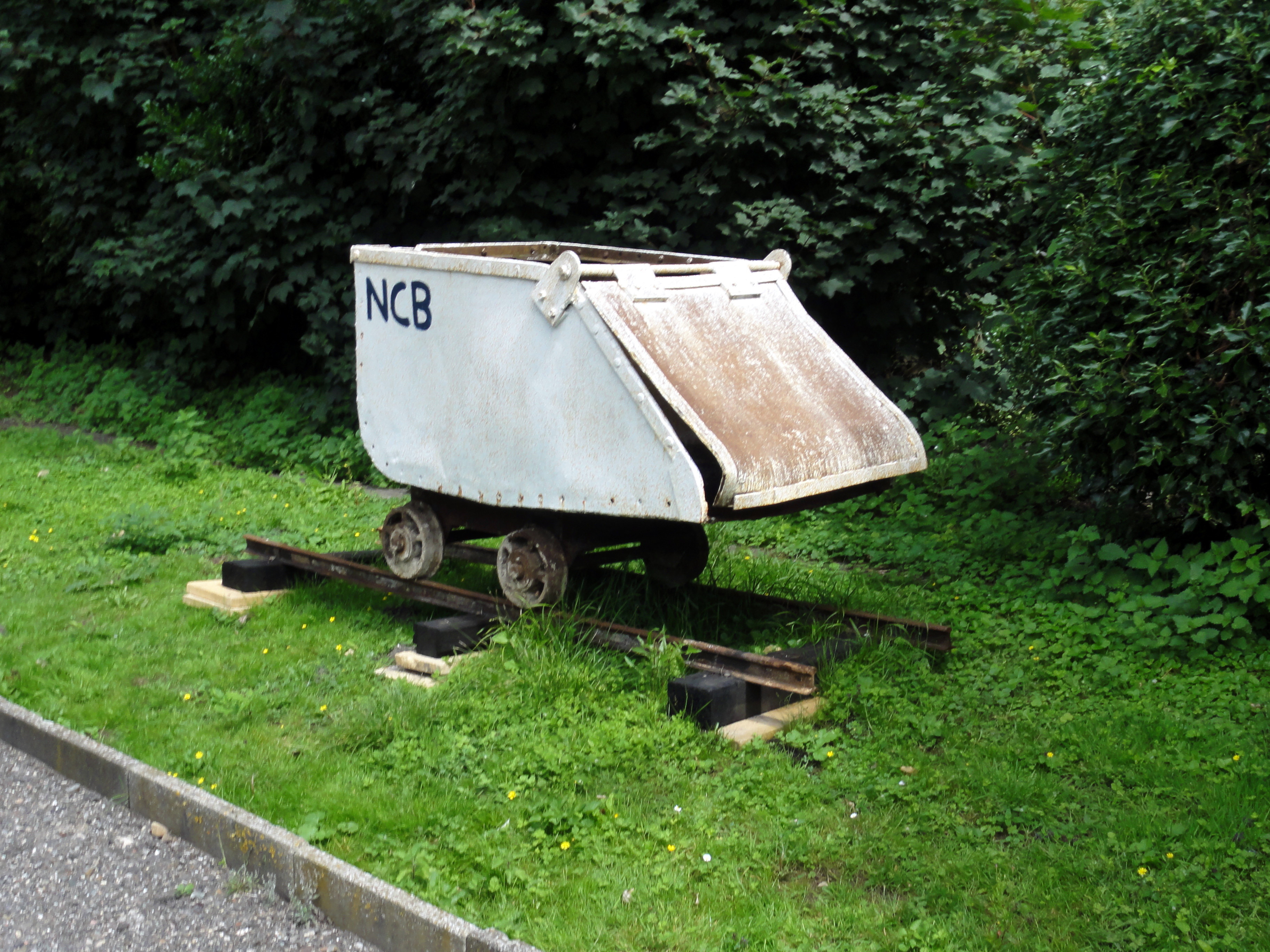
One of the mine's coal wagons

The colliery management implemented the wage reductions on 8 January and, after discovering this, the miners commenced strike action the following morning. Bornstein (1986) records that 1,600 miners went on strike while Mak (2015) states there were 2,000, and this did not include the workers on the surface who were prevented from working due to the cessation of the coal supply. The strike attracted some attention, strikers were interviewed by the social research organisation Mass-Observation, and there was much press coverage, most of which was unfavourable and described the miners as unpatriotic for striking during a time of total war. The miners disputed the press claims and noted that they had continued to work the mine during air raids, including one that hit the colliery buildings, and that 250 miners had joined the Home Guard and continued to report for duty throughout the strike.

It was decided to instigate prosecutions against the striking miners, though Minister of Labour and National Service Ernest Bevin advised against this. One legal issue was that Order 1305 had been drafted in haste and was vaguely worded. There was concern that some miners may not have been aware that it was illegal to strike and the Department of Mines sent officers to explain this to the miners. The strike continued and a trial was held at Canterbury on 23 January. The miners held a procession to the court accompanied by bands and crowds of women and children. The miners particularly feared a prison sentence which would prevent them from finding work at other mines.

The three union branch leaders involved in the strike faced civil charges for breach of contract as well as criminal charges under Order 1305 and under regulation 58AA of the Defence Regulations. The civil prosecution proceeded first and the prosecution set out its case focusing on the alleged unpatriotic conduct of the miners. The prosecution then withdrew the charges, which prevented the defendants from responding to the allegations. The criminal case focused on the legal question of whether the miners had given the required 21 days' notice to the ministry for arbitration and not on the rights and wrongs of the pay dispute. The defendants were found guilty. One official was sentenced to two months' imprisonment with hard labour and the other two received one-month sentences. The 35 miners working on No. 2 Face received £3 fines and 1,050 other striking miners were fined £1. The fines, if not paid, would result in imprisonment with hard labour. One of the union officials imprisoned, Tudor Davies, was well known in the community and was himself a justice of the peace.

== Resolution ==
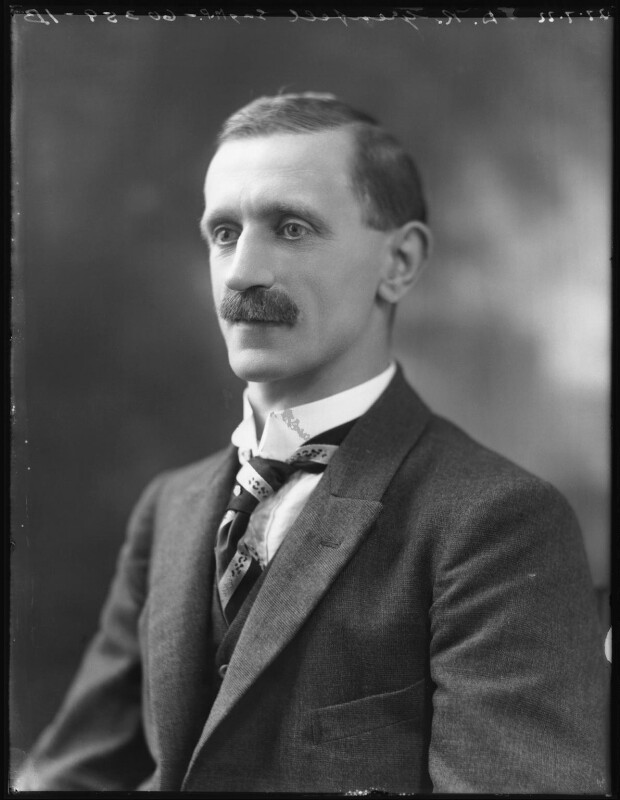
David Rhys Grenfell

The Ministry of Labour and the Home Office received a record number of letters in support of the strikers and stating that the sentences imposed by the court were excessive. Before the trial some miners had considered abandoning the strike and returning to work. Their families were suffering through a cold winter without coal, usually obtained at a subsidy from the mine, and some had resorted to burning furniture and floor boards. However, the trial and sentences passed seem to have hardened their position; a vote among the men on 26 January confirmed that the strike would proceed into a third week. Other pits in the region held one-day strikes in sympathy with the Betteshanger workers.

The government were keen to end the strike over fears it could spread to other mines and threaten production at a key point of the war. Negotiations between secretary for Mines David Rhys Grenfell, secretary of the Mineworkers' Federation of Great Britain Ebby Edwards and the three imprisoned officials were held at Maidstone Prison and a settlement reached on 28 January. The mine owners agreed to pay a minimum wage provided the miners agreed to submit to judgement by an adjudicator in cases when the management considered work was intentionally slowed. The officials agreed to this and a subsequent vote by the miners also approved the terms, with the men returning to work the following day.

The terms agreed were an almost complete acceptance of the miners' original demands. Grenfell petitioned the Home Office to free the three officials; on 2 February, after 11 days in prison with hard labour (sewing mail bags), the men received a pardon from George VI and were released. Of those sentenced for participating in the strike only nine paid the fines. Struggling to find prison places for the remainder, and fearing a resumption of the strike, the government remitted the fines in July 1943. A contemporary Daily Express article claimed the strike cost the war effort 9,000 long tons (9,100 t) of coal production.

== Aftermath ==
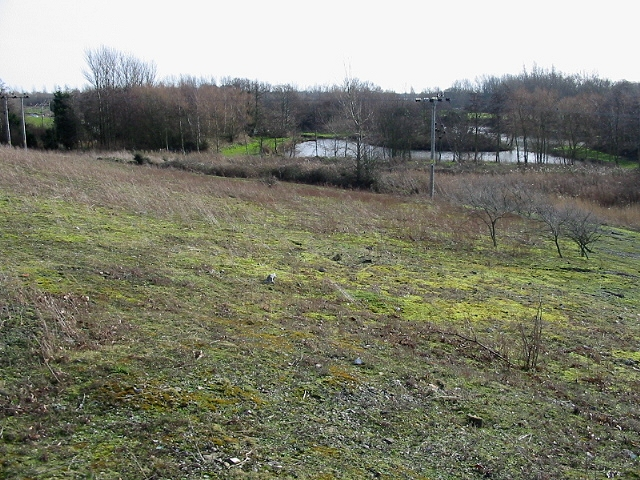
The site of Betteshanger Colliery in 2008, now part of a country park

The three officials were the last men to be sentenced to imprisonment under Order 1305 during the war; others would spend time in prison for these offences but only as a result of non-payment of fines. The Betteshanger strike was the most publicised strike of the war and the only one to affect coal mines during the Second World War. The government deliberately limited production quotas after works resumed at Betteshanger, restricting the productivity of the mine. The mine maintained its militant tradition and was the last in the country to return to work after the 1984–85 miners' strike. The colliery, the last remaining in Kent, was closed in 1989.

Order 1305 was not repealed until 1951. Though intended to limit the number of strikes, the frequency during its period of operation (1940–51) was actually greater than in the period 1931–39. Because of this the 1968 Royal Commission on Trade Unions and Employers' Associations cited Order 1305 and the Betteshanger strike as an example of the ineffectiveness of outlawing strikes. However Bogg et al (2020) note that, as the economic conditions experienced during the Order 1305 era meant that strikes were more powerful during this time than previously, it is possible that without the order there would have been more strikes. In all, some 109 prosecutions against 6,000 workers were brought during the Second World War, though many were dropped entirely or the defendants merely bound over to keep the peace.
