= Eastry =

Civil parish in Kent, England

Coordinates: 51.2452°N 1.3034°E

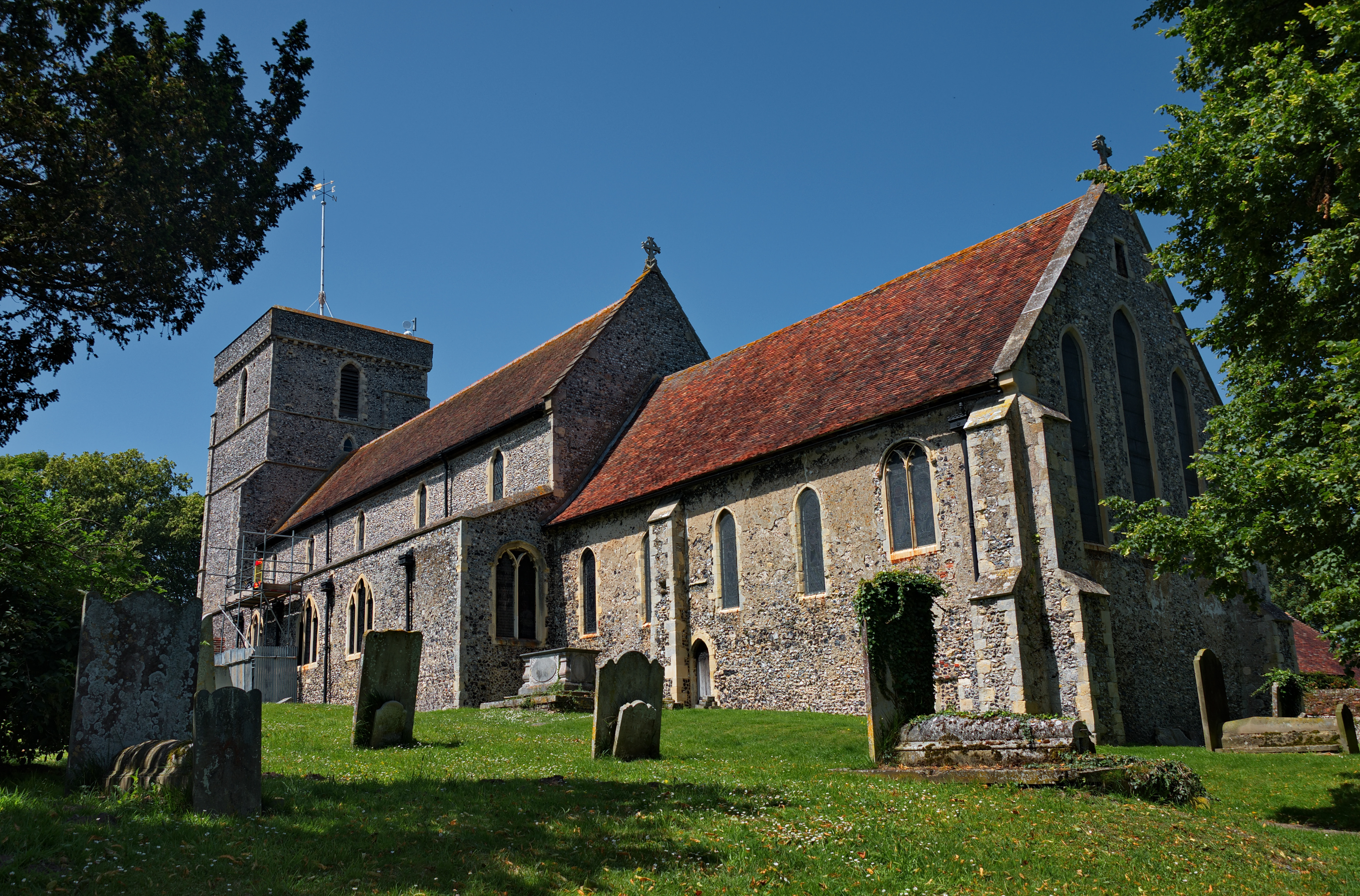
- Church of St Mary the Virgin, Eastry

- Location within Kent
- Population: 2,492 (2011 census)
- OS grid reference: TR309549
- Civil parish: Eastry
- District: Dover
- Shire county: Kent
- Region: South East
- Country: England
- Sovereign state: United Kingdom
- Post town: SANDWICH
- Postcode district: CT13
- Dialling code: 01304
- Police: Kent
- Fire: Kent
- Ambulance: South East Coast
- UK Parliament: Dover and Deal

Eastry is a village and civil parish in the Dover district, in Kent, England, around 2 1/2 miles (4 km) southwest of Sandwich. It was voted "Kent Village of the Year 2005". The parish includes the hamlets of Heronden and Selson. In 2011 the parish had a population of 2492.

The name is derived from the Old English Ēast-rige, meaning "eastern province" (cf. Sūþ-rige "southern province"), also recorded as Ēastregē, from ēasterra gē (lit. "more easterly area").

Poison Cross is a location with an unusual name at the north end of the village. A railway halt there had a short life.

== Historical legends ==
Eastry lies on the Roman road north from Dover to Richborough Castle.

In the Early Middle Ages, Eastry was part of the Kingdom of Kent and was an important administrative centre. It was here that a royal palace of the Saxon kings of Kent stood. One of Kent's oldest legends concerns King Ecgberht of Kent and the murder of his young cousins, Æthelred and Æthelberht, within the palace walls. According to the legend, the royal residence was passed to the priory of Christchurch in Canterbury as penance for the crime. The site of this ancient palace is believed to now be occupied by Eastry Court, adjacent to the church. An archaeological dig by Time Team in 2006 failed to find the royal palace.

== Parish church ==
Eastry's Grade I listed Anglican church is dedicated to St Mary the Virgin. Within the church is a brass standard bushel measure given in 1792.

== Governance ==
An electoral ward in the same name exists. This ward stretches south to Sutton with a total population taken at the 2011 census of 5,199.

Until 1974 it was in Eastry Rural District.

== East Kent Light Railway ==
The East Kent Light Railway was opened to freight traffic in 1911 and passenger traffic in 1916. Its purpose was to serve the new coal mines which were being opened up in the area. Among the stations opened were 'Eastry' and 'Eastry South'. It was one of Colonel Stephens' lines, but was nationalized in 1948 becoming part of British Railways, Southern Region. Both the colliery and the line failed and the section north of Eythorne completely closed by 1951.

The village is also on the Miner's Way Trail. The trail links up the coalfield parishes of East Kent.

== Mills ==
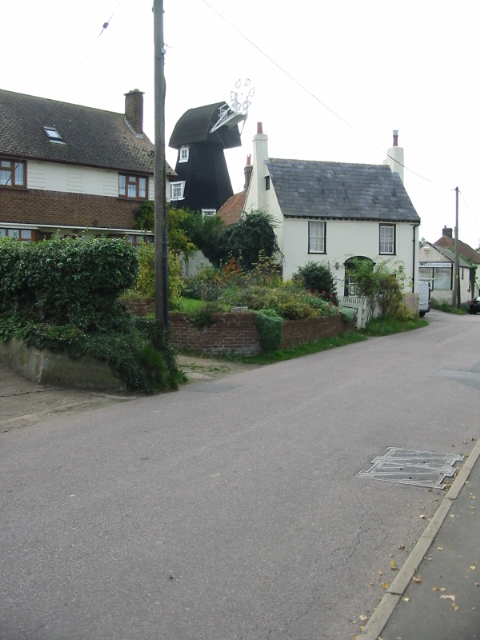
Eastry windmill

Eastry has had a number of windmills over the centuries. There were four mills marked on the 1819–1843 Ordnance Survey map, one of which, the Upper Mill, has been converted into a house. Currently there are three windmills in Eastry.

== Notable people ==
- Cyril Randolph (1826–1912), cricketer and clergyman
- Sir James Broadwood Lyall GCIE KCSI (1838–4 December 1916) died and is buried in Eastry. He was a British administrator in the Indian Civil Service during the British Raj. Lyallpur, which was named after him, is the third most-populous city in Pakistan, and the second largest in the eastern province of Punjab
- Sydney Greenstreet (1879–1954) stage and film actor
- Wing Commander Robert Stanford Tuck lived in the village from 1953 until his retirement in the 1970s
- Captain John Harvey 1740-1794
