= Worth, Kent =

Village in Kent, England

Coordinates: 51.2563°N 1.3472°E

Worth
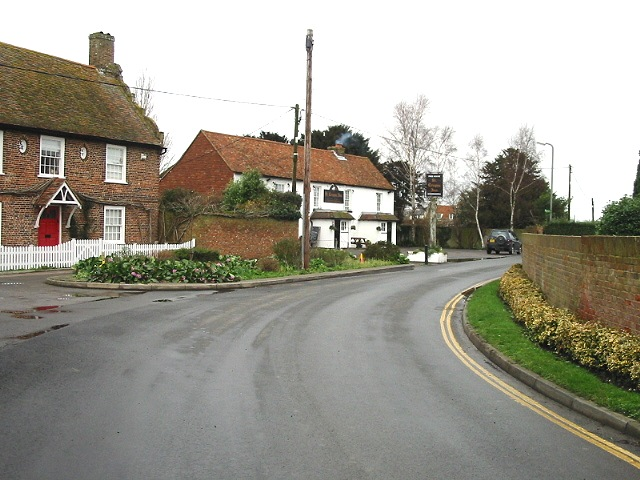
- The Crispin Inn, Worth

- Location within Kent
- Population: 992 (2011 Census)
- OS grid reference: TR336561
- Civil parish: Worth
- District: Dover
- Shire county: Kent
- Region: South East
- Country: England
- Sovereign state: United Kingdom
- Post town: DEAL
- Postcode district: CT14
- Dialling code: 01304
- Police: Kent
- Fire: Kent
- Ambulance: South East Coast
- UK Parliament: Dover and Deal
- Website: Worth Parish Council

Worth is a village and civil parish in the Dover District of Kent, England, situated 2 kilometres (1.2 mi) south of Sandwich. It has two public houses, a church, and a school. According to the 2011 UK Census, Worth had a population of 992.

Worth was supposedly first inhabited due to its fertile soils. This eventually led to the cultivation of the land during Norman times by the Lords of the Eastry Manor.

== History ==
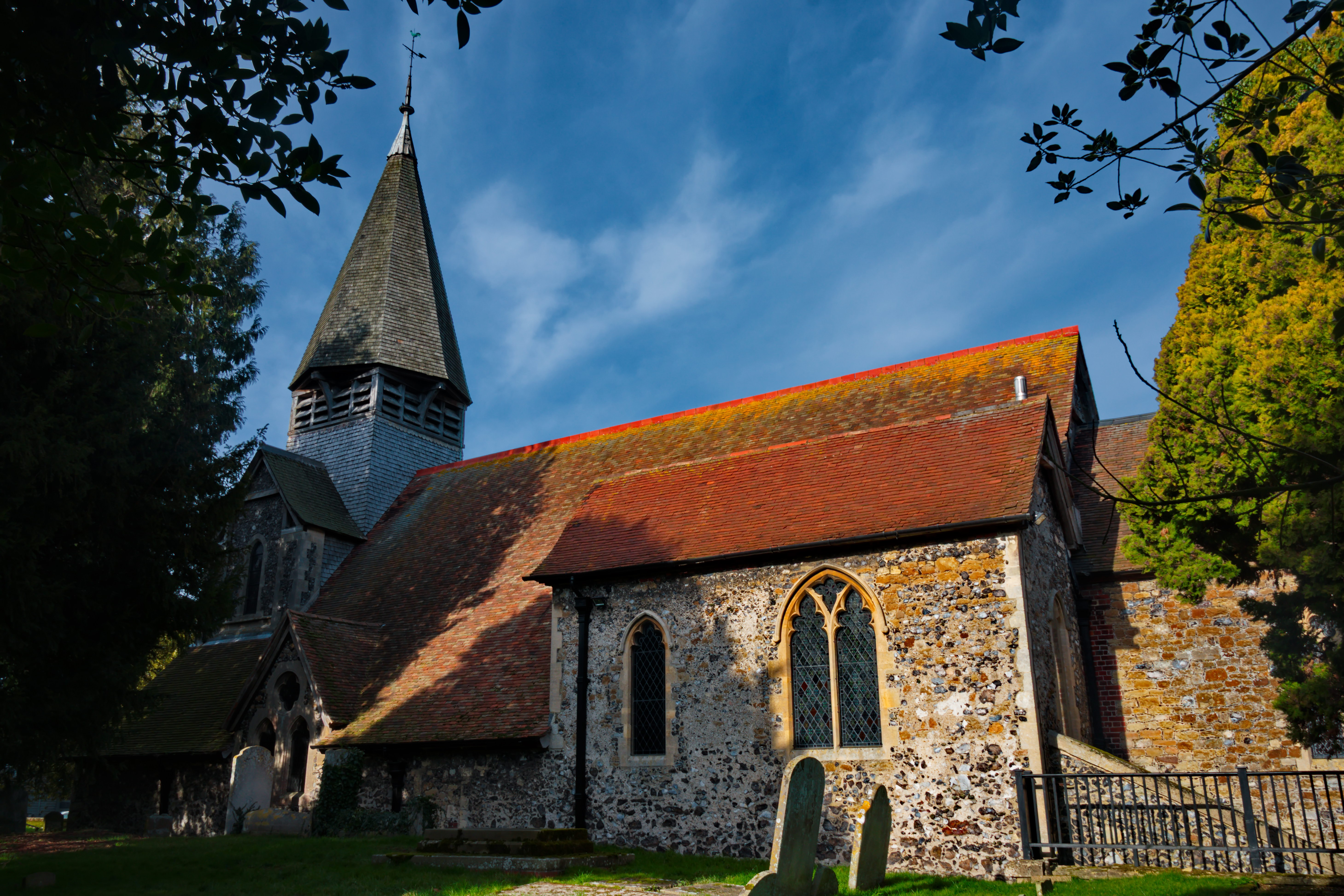
St Peter & St Paul's Church, Worth, Kent.

According to Hasted in the 18th century, Worth was made up of three boroughs, only one of which makes up the current village of the 21st century, Worth Street. In the Gazetteer of the British Isles in 1887, John Bartholomew described Worth as coastal parish and village. During the sixteenth century, the area was known for its redbrick style of housing, however the parish church of St Peter & St Paul's, depicted on the left, shows the signs of Norman work from the twelfth century.

=== Name ===
The parish name of Worth is said to relate to the word Enclosure, and incorporates a description of "elements and their meanings".

=== Literature ===
C.S. Forester's fictional naval hero Horatio Hornblower was born in the village of Worth, according to Hornblower's biographer Cyril Northcote Parkinson in The Life and Times of Horatio Hornblower. According to Parkinson, the name of the village varied in the 18th century from Word or Worde to Worth and that a farm called the Blue Pigeons was central to the smuggling business at that time. There is today a Blue Pigeon Inn in Worth.

It is said by a local legend that Henry V was returning on 25 October, also known as St Crispin's Day, where he had claimed victory at Agincourt, disembarking at Worth. Here he fell in love with a local "ale-wife", where they ended up living together at the local inn. supposedly as to why the Crispin Inn (pictured) of Worth is named as it is.

=== Location ===
The two Ordnance Survey maps below depict Worth, a century apart.

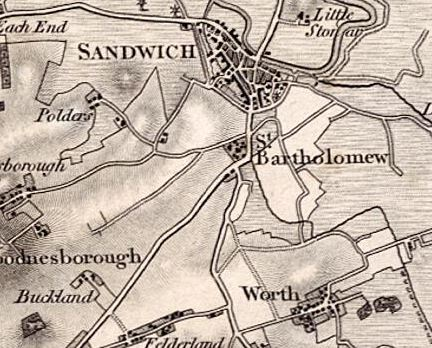
A 19th Century Ordnance Survey map of Worth

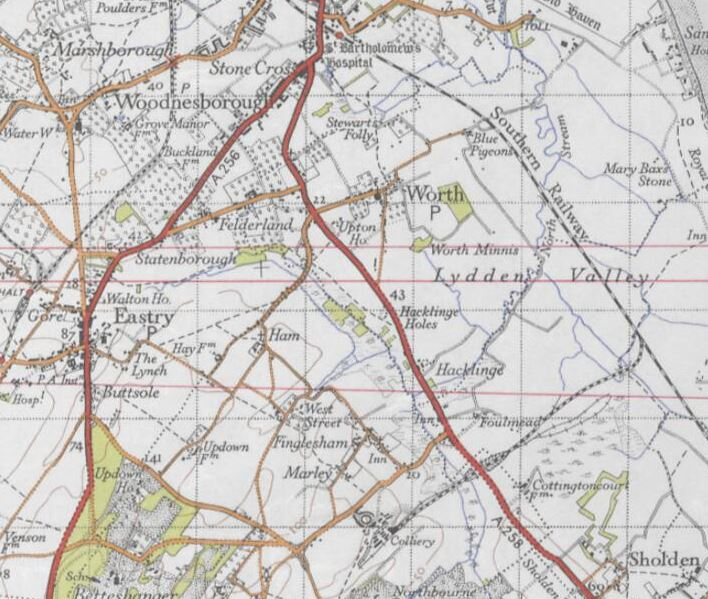
Worth on a 1945 Ordnance Survey map

== Demographics ==
=== Population ===
The village of Worth covers an area of 1,629 hectares and, with a population of 992, it has a population density of 0.61 people per hectare. In 1801, the village had a population of 264 people, which rose to 718 by 1961. The population peaked at 977 in 1931 and, after a drop, it climbed above the 977 mark in the 2011 census.

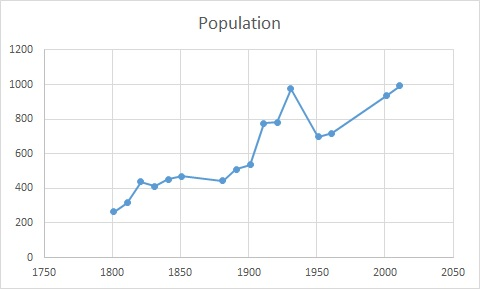
Total population of the civil parish of Worth: 1801–2011. After peaking in 1931, the population fell, reaching its previous level in 2011.

=== Employment ===
Male employment type in Worth 1881. The majority of workers were employed in agriculture and domestic services, followed by defence. Minimal numbers were professional or worked with textiles

As shown in the graphs to the right, female and male employment in history has been very different. In 2011 in Worth there were 414 people ages 16–74 in formal employment, with the majority of these in wholesale and retail trade; and repair of motor vehicles (58), closely followed by those working in education (51). In 2011 Worth had 431 people listed as economically active, which left a total of 272 economically inactive. Despite this only 18 are listed as 'unemployed', as the majority of those who are economically inactive are either retired, students, on long term sick leave, disabled or are carers for other family members.

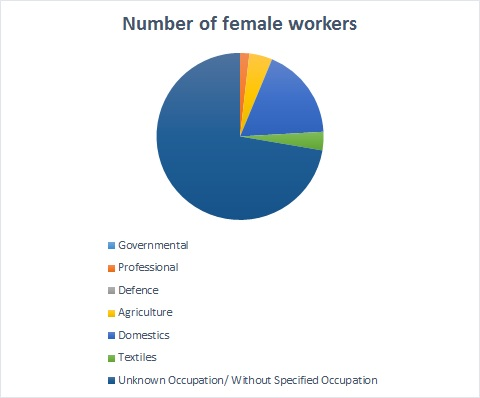
Female employment type in Worth 1881. The majority have no specific occupation, most likely housewives. The largest proportion of employed females were in domestic service, and minimal numbers worked as professionals, or in agriculture and textiles

=== Housing ===
Within Worth there are 403 households, the majority of these have either 1 or 2 occupants, 106 and 183 respectively.

=== Social ===
The 2011 census returns confirmed that the most common religion in Worth was Christianity, with 651 adherents, compared to 225 with no religion. This follows the trends of the whole district of Dover. Health in the area was high, with only 82 people out of 992 being in bad or very bad health. In 2011, 950 of the 992 residents were born in the United Kingdom.
