= Northbourne, Kent =

Village in Kent, England

Coordinates: 51.220°N 1.339°E

Northbourne
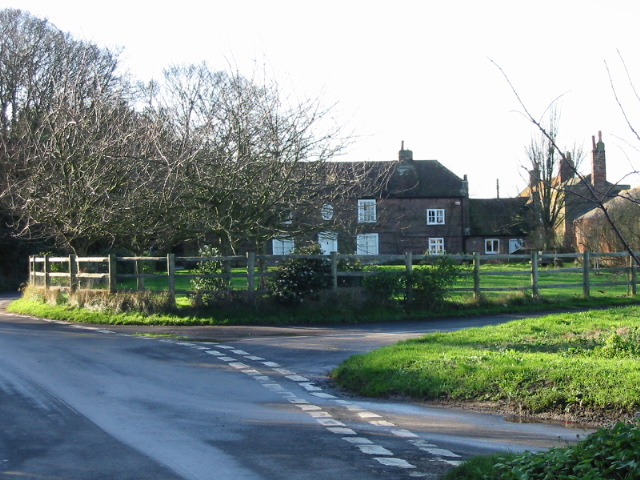
- A house in Northbourne

- Location within Kent
- Population: 772 (Including Betteshanger, Finglesham, Hacklinge, and Marley. 2011)
- OS grid reference: TR3352
- District: Dover
- Shire county: Kent
- Region: South East
- Country: England
- Sovereign state: United Kingdom
- Post town: Deal
- Postcode district: CT14
- Police: Kent
- Fire: Kent
- Ambulance: South East Coast
- UK Parliament: Dover and Deal

Northbourne is a village and civil parish near Deal in Kent, England. It has a public house, The Hare and Hounds, a primary school and is the home of the current, and prior, Baron Northbourne. It should not be confused with an area in Bournemouth of the same name.

Within the parish is The Miner's Way Trail, which links up the coalfield parishes of East Kent.

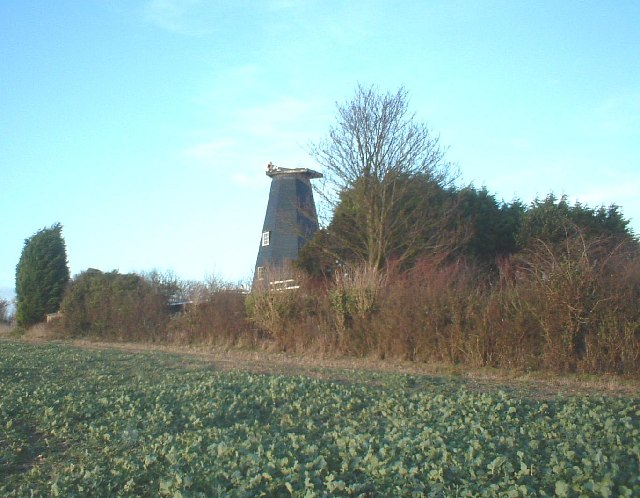
New Mill, Northbourne

== Northbourne Court ==
In the 16th century Northbourne Court was the home of Miles Pendred and his wife Elizabeth Lewin and their family. She had been a nurse to Elizabeth I, and her daughter Anne's husband Edward Sanders was sometimes called the Queen's "foster brother". The old house and chapel were ruined and demolished by 1750, but the garden wall still survives. An engraving of the chapel ruins drawn by John Mercer was published in the Gentleman's Magazine for December 1802.
