= CT postcode area =

Postcode area within the United Kingdom

Canterbury
- Postcode area
- Location within the United Kingdom
- Coordinates: 51.257°N 1.232°E
- Sovereign state: United Kingdom
- Postcode area: CT
- Postcode area name: Canterbury
- Post towns: 13
- Postcode districts: 22
- Postcode sectors: 83
- Postcodes (live): 14,846
- Postcodes (total): 19,715
- Statistics as at May 2020

The CT postcode area, also known as the Canterbury postcode area, is a group of 21 postcode districts in South East England, within 13 post towns. These cover much of east Kent, including Canterbury, Dover, Folkestone, Birchington, Broadstairs, Deal, Herne Bay, Hythe, Margate, Ramsgate, Sandwich, Westgate-on-Sea and Whitstable.

== Coverage ==
The approximate coverage of the postcode districts:

Postcode district	Post town	Coverage	Local authority area(s)
CT1	CANTERBURY	Canterbury (City centre, St Martins, Northgate and Sturry Road, South Canterbury, Thanington)	Canterbury
CT2	CANTERBURY	Canterbury (Hales Place, London Road, St Stephen’s and Broad Oak Road, St Dunstans and Whitstable Road), Harbledown, Rough Common, Sturry, Fordwich, Blean, Tyler Hill, Broad Oak, Westbere	Canterbury
CT3	CANTERBURY	Wingham, Hersden, Ash, Littlebourne	Canterbury, Dover
CT4	CANTERBURY	Canterbury (Nackington Road, Stuppington), Chartham, Bridge, Nackington, Lower Hardres, Patrixbourne, Bekesbourne, Chartham Hatch, Part of Harbledown and Rough Common	Canterbury
CT5	WHITSTABLE	Whitstable, Seasalter, Tankerton, Chestfield, Swalecliffe, Yorkletts	Canterbury
CT6	HERNE BAY	Herne Bay, Herne, Broomfield, Greenhill, Eddington, Beltinge, Reculver	Canterbury
CT7	BIRCHINGTON	Birchington-on-Sea, St Nicholas-at-Wade, Sarre, Acol	Thanet
CT8	WESTGATE-ON-SEA	Westgate-on-Sea	Thanet
CT9	MARGATE	Margate, Cliftonville, Birchington, Garlinge, Westbrook	Thanet
CT10	BROADSTAIRS	Broadstairs, St Peter's	Thanet
CT11	RAMSGATE	Ramsgate, Pegwell	Thanet
CT12	RAMSGATE	Northwood, Minster-in-Thanet, Cliffsend, Monkton, Manston	Thanet
CT13	SANDWICH	Sandwich, Eastry, Woodnesborough, Great Stonar, Richborough	Dover
CT14	DEAL	Deal, Walmer, Kingsdown, Ringwould, Sholden, Great Mongeham, Worth, Ripple, Tilmanstone, Betteshanger	Dover
CT15	DOVER	Alkham, Lydden, Eythorne, St Margaret's at Cliffe, Elvington	Dover
CT16	DOVER	Dover (town centre and roughly east of A256), Whitfield, Temple Ewell	Dover
CT17	DOVER	Dover (roughly west of A256), Tower Hamlets, River	Dover
CT18	FOLKESTONE	Hawkinge, Lyminge, Etchinghill, Capel-le-Ferne, Densole, Newington	Dover, Folkestone and Hythe
CT19	FOLKESTONE	Folkestone (north), Cheriton	Folkestone and Hythe
CT20	FOLKESTONE	Folkestone (south), Sandgate	Folkestone and Hythe
CT21	HYTHE	Hythe, Saltwood, Lympne, Postling, Newingreen, West Hythe, Westenhanger	Folkestone and Hythe
CT50	FOLKESTONE	Saga Group	non-geographic

== Map ==
CT postcode area map, showing postcode districts in red and post towns in grey text, with links to nearby ME and TN postcode areas.

== See also ==
- List of postcode areas in the United Kingdom
- Postcode Address File
