= Sholden =

Village in Kent, England

Coordinates: 51.2230°N 1.3712°E

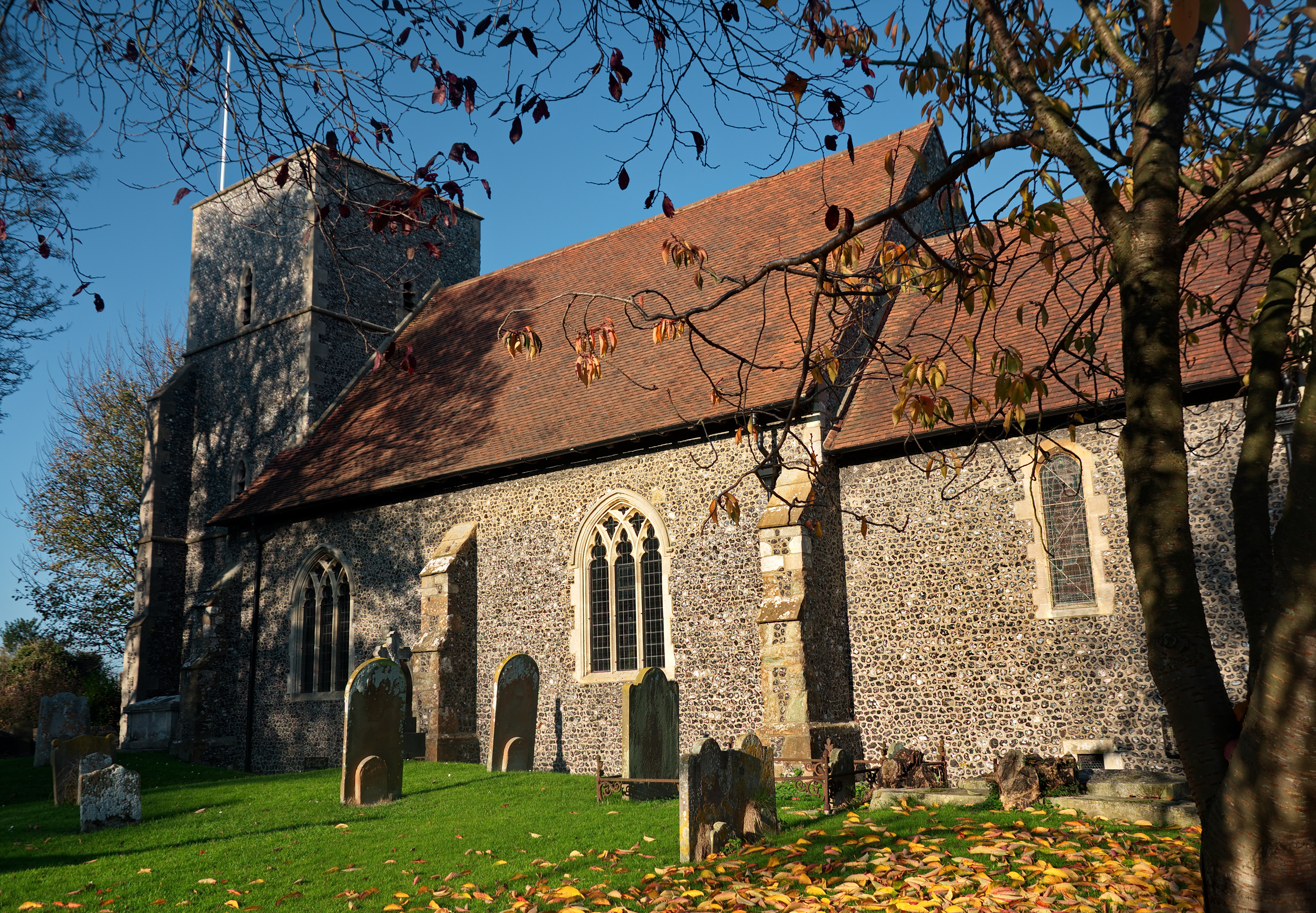
- St Nicholas' Church, Sholden

- Location within Kent
- Population: 1,084 (2011)
- OS grid reference: TR355525
- District: Dover
- Shire county: Kent
- Region: South East
- Country: England
- Sovereign state: United Kingdom
- Post town: DEAL
- Postcode district: CT14
- Dialling code: 01304
- Police: Kent
- Fire: Kent
- Ambulance: South East Coast
- UK Parliament: Dover and Deal

Sholden is a small village adjacent to the seaside town of Deal, lying on the road towards Sandwich in Kent, South East England.

== History ==
It has previously been known as 'Soldone' and 'Scholdon'.

It has a Grade II* listed church, St Nicholas, which is in the diocese of Canterbury, and deanery of Sandwich. It also has a school, a cricket field and one public house, 'The Sportsman'.

It is the starting point of the Miner's Way Trail, a hiking trail linking up the coalfield parishes of East Kent.

== Governance ==
Sholden is part of the electoral ward of Middle Deal and Sholden. The population of this ward at the 2011 Census was 7,414.
