= Eythorne =

Village in Kent, England

Coordinates: 51.1971°N 1.2662°E

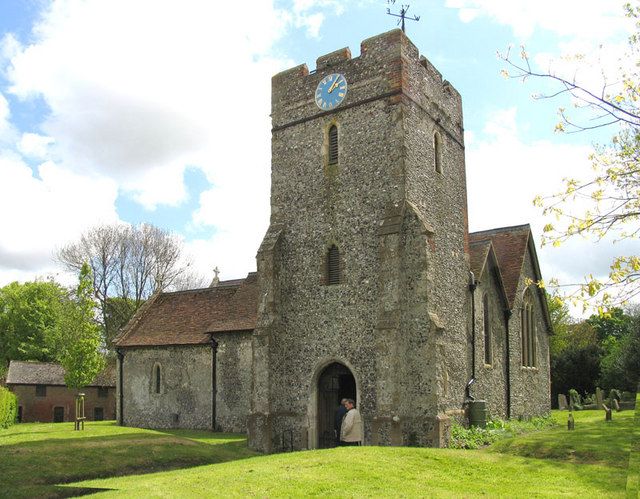
- Church of St Peter & St Paul, Eythorne

- Location within Kent
- Population: 2,594 (2011)
- District: Dover
- Shire county: Kent
- Region: South East
- Country: England
- Sovereign state: United Kingdom
- Post town: Dover
- Postcode district: CT15
- Dialling code: 01304
- Police: Kent
- Fire: Kent
- Ambulance: South East Coast
- UK Parliament: Dover

Eythorne is a civil parish and small village located 7.3 miles north-northwest of Dover in Kent, with a combined population of approximately 2,500 residents including nearby villages Barfrestone and Elvington. Although not classed as one of the former pit villages of Kent, it was only about a mile from Tilmanstone – which closed in 1986. Today many of its residents commute to work in Dover, Deal and Canterbury.

Eythorne Baptist Church is more than 450 years old and one of the first Baptist churches in the United Kingdom. Esther Copley, wife of William Copley, who was a minister in Eythorne from about 1839 to 1843, was a prolific and successful writer of children's books and books on the domestic economy. She died in the village in 1851.

Eythorne once had three pubs; The Crown is still trading, but the White Horse and the Palm Tree are long closed, both now being residential properties.

Eythorne is historically divided into two halves: Lower Eythorne, where the Church of England and Roman Catholic churches are situated, and Upper Eythorne, where the village shop and the Crown public house are located, and where most of today's villagers live. Many reside in the small housing developments that sprang up in the late 1960s and early 1970s.

== Governance ==
Eythorne is in the electoral ward called Eythorne and Shepherdswell. The population of this ward at the 2011 Census was 4,815.

== Transport ==
There are buses to Dover and Canterbury, located 13 miles away. The nearest railway station is 3 miles away in the nearby village of Shepherdswell. The village is on the heritage East Kent Railway.

== Amenities ==
Eythorne has a post office, a primary school, a pub and a village shop.

== See also ==
- Kent coalfield
