= Dover District =

Coordinates: 51.130°N 1.311°E

- Non-metropolitan district
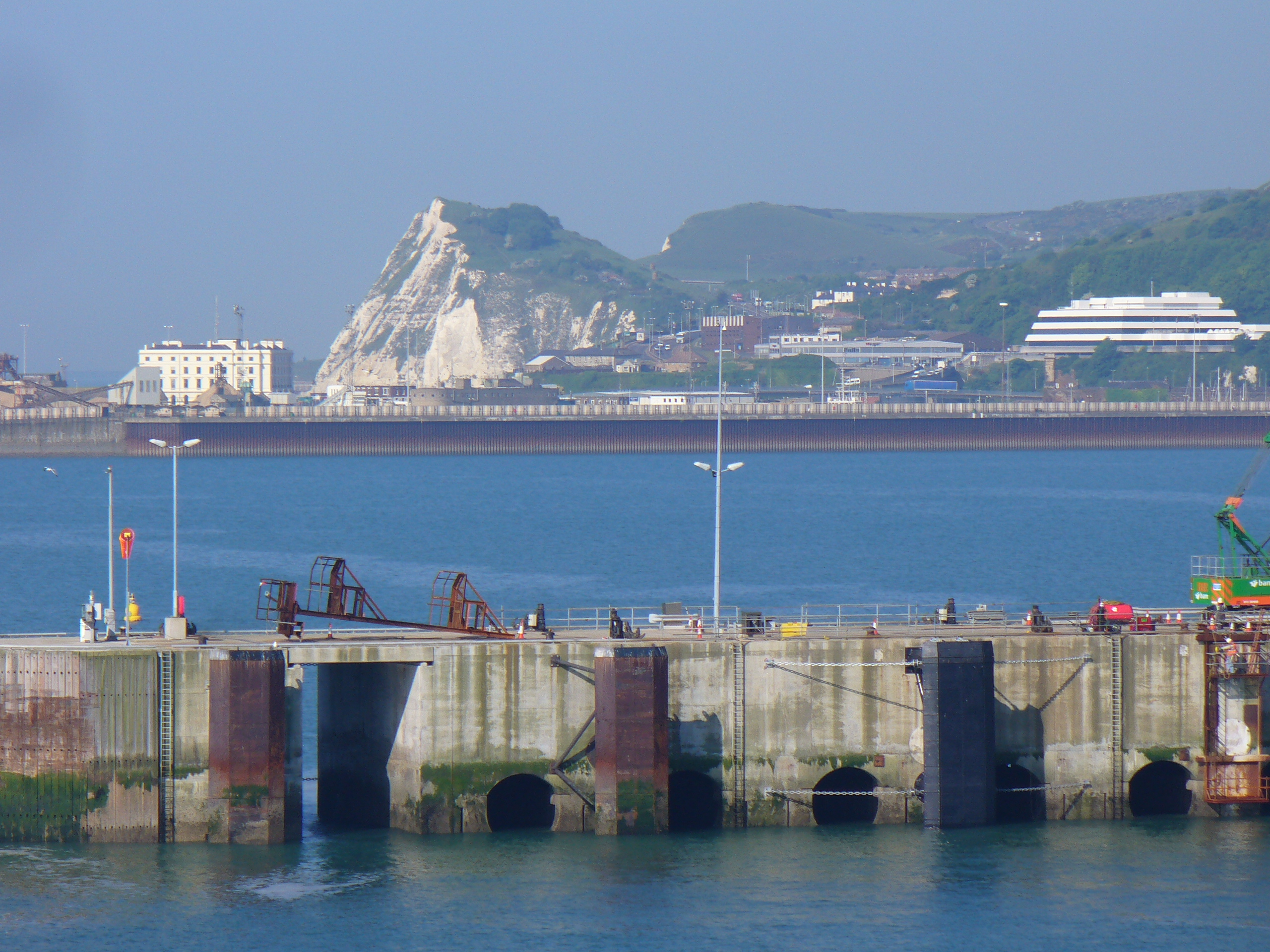
- Shakespeare Cliff and Dover town skyline and coastline

- Coat of arms

- Dover shown within Kent
- Sovereign state: United Kingdom
- Constituent country: England
- Region: South East England
- Non-metropolitan county: Kent
- Status: Non-metropolitan district
- Admin HQ: Dover
- Incorporated: 1 April 1974

Government
  - Type: Non-metropolitan district council
  - Body: Dover District Council
  - Leadership: Leader & Cabinet
  - MPs: Mike Tapp (Labour); Polly Billington (Labour)

Area
  - Total: 121.56 sq mi (314.84 km^{2})
  - Rank: 116th (of 296)

Population (2024)
  - Total: 119,768
  - Rank: 208th (of 296)
  - Density: 985.26/sq mi (380.41/km^{2})

Ethnicity (2021)
  - Ethnic groups: List: 94.9% White; 2.1% Asian; 1.5% Mixed; 0.9% other; 0.7% Black

Religion (2021)
  - Religion: List: 49.6% Christianity; 42.4% no religion; 5.5% not stated; 0.6% Islam; 0.6% Hinduism; 0.6% other; 0.4% Buddhism; 0.2% Judaism; 0.1% Sikhism
- Time zone: UTC0 (UTC)
  - Summer (DST): UTC+1 (BST)
- ONS code: 29UE (ONS); E07000108 (GSS)
- OS grid reference: TR315415

Dover is a local government district in Kent, England. It is named after its largest town, the port town of Dover. The council is based in Whitfield on the outskirts of Dover. The district also covers the towns of Deal, Sandwich and Walmer as well as the surrounding rural areas.

The district borders Thanet District to the north, the City of Canterbury to the west, and Folkestone and Hythe District to the south-west. To the south and east, it faces the Strait of Dover.

== History ==
The district was formed on 1 April 1974 under the Local Government Act 1972. It covered the whole area of four former districts and part of a fifth, all of which were abolished at the same time:

- Deal Municipal Borough
- Dover Municipal Borough
- Dover Rural District
- Eastry Rural District (except five parishes which went to Thanet)
- Sandwich Municipal Borough

The new district was named Dover after its largest town.

Under current local government reorganisation plans, all district councils in Kent, as well as the county council, will be abolished in 2028, with the district becoming part of a new East Kent unitary authority.

== Governance ==
Dover District Council

Type
- Type: Non-metropolitan district

Leadership
- Chair: Susan Beer, Labour since 21 May 2025
- Leader: Kevin Mills, Labour since 17 May 2023
- Chief Executive: Nadeem Aziz since April 2002

Structure
- Seats: 32 councillors
- Graph of the party split among 32 seats.
- Political groups: Administration (12) Labour (12) Other parties (20) Conservative (13) Independent (6) Green (1)

Elections
- Last election: 4 May 2023

Meeting place
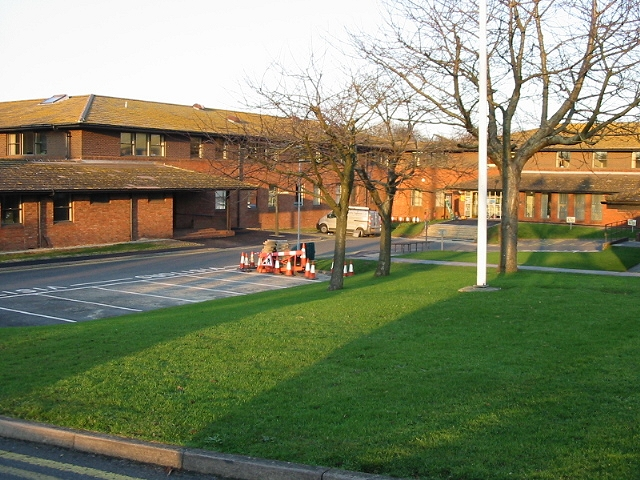
- Council Offices, Honeywood Close, White Cliffs Business Park, Whitfield, Dover, CT16 3PJ

Website
- www.dover.gov.uk

Dover District Council provides district-level services. County-level services are provided by Kent County Council. The whole district is also covered by civil parishes, which form a third tier of local government.

=== Political control ===
Following the 2023 election, the council was under Labour majority control. They subsequently lost their majority following changes of allegiance in January 2025, leaving the council under no overall control.

The first election to the council was held in 1973, initially operating as a shadow authority alongside the outgoing authorities until the new arrangements came into effect on 1 April 1974. Political control of the council since 1974 has been as follows:

Party in control	Years
Conservative	1974–1991
No overall control	1991–1995
Labour	1995–1999
No overall control	1999–2007
Conservative	2007–2023
Labour	2023–2025
No overall control	2025–present

=== Leadership ===
The leaders of the council (formally the chair of the policy and resources committee prior to 2001) have been:

Councillor	Party	From	To
Alexander Greenway-Stanley	Conservative	1974	1976
Raymond Norley	Conservative	1976	1977
Alexander Greenway-Stanley	Conservative	1977	1978
Gwladys Payne	Conservative	1978	1986
Graham Forster	Conservative	1986	Sep 1986
Paul Watkins	Conservative	Sep 1986	1989
George Tyler	Conservative	1989	Oct 1989
Christopher Smith	Conservative	Oct 1989	1992
Paul Watkins	Conservative	1992	Dec 1993
Tony Sansum	Labour	Dec 1993	Nov 1995
Terry Birkett	Labour	Nov 1995	1998
Reg Hansell	Labour	Nov 1998	1999
Terry Birkett	Labour	1999	2001
Peter Wells	Labour	2001	2003
Paul Watkins	Conservative	14 May 2003	30 Sep 2017
Keith Morris	Conservative	18 Oct 2017	14 Oct 2019
Trevor Bartlett	Conservative	30 Oct 2019	May 2023
Kevin Mills	Labour	17 May 2023	

=== Composition ===
Following the 2023 election, and changes of allegiance up to May 2025, the composition of the council was:

Party	Councillors
Conservative	14
Labour	12
Independent	6
Total	32

Three of the independent councillors form the "Independent Group".

=== Premises ===
The council's main offices are at the White Cliffs Business park in the parish of Whitfield, to the north of the town of Dover itself.

=== Elections ===
Since the last boundary changes in 2019 the council has comprised 32 councillors representing 17 wards, with each ward electing one, two or three councillors. Elections are held every four years.

== Geography ==
The northern boundary of the district is the River Stour; on its western side is the district of Canterbury; to the south the parish of Capel-le-Ferne; and to the east the Straits of Dover. The southern part of the latter is the point where the North Downs meets the sea, at the White Cliffs of Dover. Further north along the coast, from Deal onwards, the land is at sea level, where the River Stour enters the sea by a circuitous route. It is here, on the sand-dunes, that the Royal St George's Golf Club, founded in 1887, and of international repute, is situated.

In the district are industrial remains of the erstwhile Kent coalfield, situated around Tilmanstone and Betteshanger. Half of the underwater section of the Channel Tunnel is under British Sovereignty and thus part of the district.

== Parishes ==
There are 35 civil parishes covering the whole district. The parish councils of Deal, Dover, Sandwich and Walmer take the style "town council".

- Alkham
- Ash
- Aylesham
- Capel-le-Ferne
- Deal (town)
- Denton with Wootton
- Dover (town)
- Eastry
- Eythorne
- Goodnestone
- Great Mongeham
- Guston
- Hougham Without
- Langdon
- Lydden
- Nonington
- Northbourne
- Preston
- Ringwould with Kingsdown
- Ripple
- River
- Sandwich (town)
- Shepherdswell with Coldred
- Sholden
- St Margaret's at Cliffe
- Staple
- Stourmouth
- Sutton
- Temple Ewell
- Tilmanstone
- Walmer (town)
- Whitfield
- Wingham
- Woodnesborough
- Worth

== Communications ==
Deal Timeball is a Victorian maritime Greenwich Mean Time signal located on the roof of a waterfront four-storey tower. It was established in 1855 by the Astronomer Royal George Biddell Airy in collaboration with Charles V. Walker.

Crossing Dover district are the Roman roads of Watling Street and that leading from Richborough. Today the main road, the A2, closely follows Watling Street to Dover.
