= Listed buildings in Shepherdswell with Coldred =

Civil Parish in Kent, England

Shepherdswell with Coldred is a village and civil parish in the Dover District of Kent, England. It contains 31 listed buildings that are recorded in the National Heritage List for England. Of these three are grade I, one is grade II* and 27 are grade II.

This list is based on the information retrieved online from Historic England.

== Key ==
Grade	Criteria
I	Buildings that are of exceptional interest
II*	Particularly important buildings of more than special interest
II	Buildings that are of special interest

== Listing ==
Name	Grade	Location	Type	Completed (Note: The date given is the date used by Historic England as significant for the initial building or that of an important part in the structure's description.)	Date designated	Grid ref. (Note: The grid reference is based on the British national grid reference system, sometimes known as OSGB36, used by the Ordnance Survey.) Geo-coordinates	Notes	Entry number (Note: The "List Entry Number" is a unique number assigned to each listed building and scheduled monument by Historic England.)	Image	Wikidata
West Court West Court Farmhouse	II*		farmhouse		27 August 1952	TR2479547948; 51°11′12″N 1°12′55″E		1069986	West Court West Court Farmhouse More images	Q17557624
Oast Cottage	II	Botolph Street			28 May 1987	TR2560147663; 51°11′01″N 1°13′36″E		1049111	Upload Photo	Q26301164
The Bricklayers' Arms	II	Botolph Street	pub		28 May 1987	TR2576548002; 51°11′12″N 1°13′45″E		1069987	The Bricklayers' Arms More images	Q26323472
Wall and Pier About 30 Metres East of St Siberts Place	II	Botolph Street			28 May 1987	TR2559647691; 51°11′02″N 1°13′36″E		1049121	Upload Photo	Q26301174
Wall and Piers About 20 Metres North East of St Siberts Place	II	Botolph Street			28 May 1987	TR2560947762; 51°11′04″N 1°13′37″E		1363405	Upload Photo	Q26645232
77, Church Hill (see Details for Further Address Information)	II	1 and 2, Church Hill			22 August 1962	TR2615047833; 51°11′06″N 1°14′05″E		1049129	Upload Photo	Q26301183
Church of St Pancras	I	Church Road	church building		22 August 1962	TR2744047594; 51°10′56″N 1°15′11″E		1069988	Church of St Pancras More images	Q17529702
Coldred Court Farmhouse	II	Church Road			22 August 1962	TR2737047549; 51°10′55″N 1°15′07″E		1049087	Upload Photo	Q26301142
Coldred Manor	II	Church Road			22 August 1962	TR2710447049; 51°10′39″N 1°14′52″E		1363367	Upload Photo	Q26645198
Garden Walls to Front Courtyard to Coldred Manor	II	Church Road			28 May 1987	TR2710147075; 51°10′40″N 1°14′52″E		1049096	Upload Photo	Q26301150
Canterbury Lodge	II	Coldred Road, Waldershare Park			28 May 1987	TR2794548248; 51°11′17″N 1°15′38″E		1363368	Upload Photo	Q26645199
Chilli Farmhouse	II	Coldred Road			22 August 1962	TR2705046731; 51°10′29″N 1°14′49″E		1373856	Upload Photo	Q26654773
Upton Court Farm Upton Court Farm Cottage	II	Coldred Road			25 July 1980	TR2626547725; 51°11′02″N 1°14′11″E		1069989	Upload Photo	Q26323474
Beech Cottage	II	Coxhill			28 May 1987	TR2539447502; 51°10′56″N 1°13′25″E		1373884	Upload Photo	Q26654800
Diamond Farmhouse	II	Coxhill			28 May 1987	TR2541447462; 51°10′55″N 1°13′26″E		1069991	Upload Photo	Q26323478
Linden House	II	Coxhill			28 May 1987	TR2543647502; 51°10′56″N 1°13′27″E		1069990	Upload Photo	Q26323476
Linden Villa	II	Coxhill			28 May 1987	TR2542647494; 51°10′56″N 1°13′27″E		1373860	Upload Photo	Q26654777
The Whitehall Inn	II	Eyethorne Road			28 May 1987	TR2590748210; 51°11′18″N 1°13′53″E		1069992	Upload Photo	Q26323480
Garden Cottage, Gates and Walls to Kitchen Garden, Waldershare Park	II	Gates And Walls To Kitchen Garden, Waldershare Park			22 August 1962	TR2876647841; 51°11′02″N 1°16′19″E		1052328	Upload Photo	Q26304116
Long Lane Farmhouse	II	Long Lane			28 May 1987	TR2597148950; 51°11′42″N 1°13′58″E		1069994	Upload Photo	Q26323484
Carlingcot	II	Moon Hill			8 April 1981	TR2625047877; 51°11′07″N 1°14′10″E		1052324	Upload Photo	Q26304112
Shepherdswell War Memorial	II	Shepherdswell, CT15 7LQ	war memorial		17 February 2016	TR2618047791; 51°11′04″N 1°14′06″E		1432776	Shepherdswell War Memorial More images	Q26677860
Newsole Farmhouse	II	Singledge Lane			22 August 1962	TR2838646572; 51°10′22″N 1°15′57″E		1069995	Upload Photo	Q26323486
Shepherds Well Signal Box	II	Station Road, Shepherdswell, CT15 7PD	signal box		25 April 2013	TR2574248275; 51°11′21″N 1°13′45″E		1413576	Shepherds Well Signal Box More images	Q26676349
Church of St Andrew	II	The Green	church building		28 May 1987	TR2623447753; 51°11′03″N 1°14′09″E		1049052	Church of St Andrew More images	Q26301108
Holly Tree House Sunshine Cottage	II	The Green			30 May 1979	TR2618247817; 51°11′05″N 1°14′06″E		1069993	Upload Photo	Q26323482
The Bell Inn	II	The Green	pub		28 May 1987	TR2616447775; 51°11′04″N 1°14′05″E		1051096	The Bell Inn More images	Q26303016
Fountain About 30 Metres South East of Kitchen Garden	II	Waldershare Park			28 May 1987	TR2867147685; 51°10′57″N 1°16′14″E		1069997	Upload Photo	Q26323490
Stable Court Waldershare Park the Mews, Stable Court	II	Waldershare Park			11 October 1963	TR2900248053; 51°11′09″N 1°16′32″E		1263887	Upload Photo	Q26554638
The Belvedere	I	Waldershare Park	architectural structure		22 August 1962	TR2816047499; 51°10′52″N 1°15′47″E		1051607	The Belvedere More images	Q17529689
Waldershare Park	I	Waldershare Park	English country house		13 October 1952	TR2896348018; 51°11′08″N 1°16′30″E		1247724	Waldershare Park More images	Q17529706

== See also ==
- Grade I listed buildings in Kent
- Grade II* listed buildings in Kent

== Sources ==
- Newman, John (2013) [1969], Kent: North-East and East, The Buildings of England, New Haven and London: Yale University Press, ISBN 978-0-300-18506-5
