= Ashford Steam Centre =

Operational railway museum in Kent, England

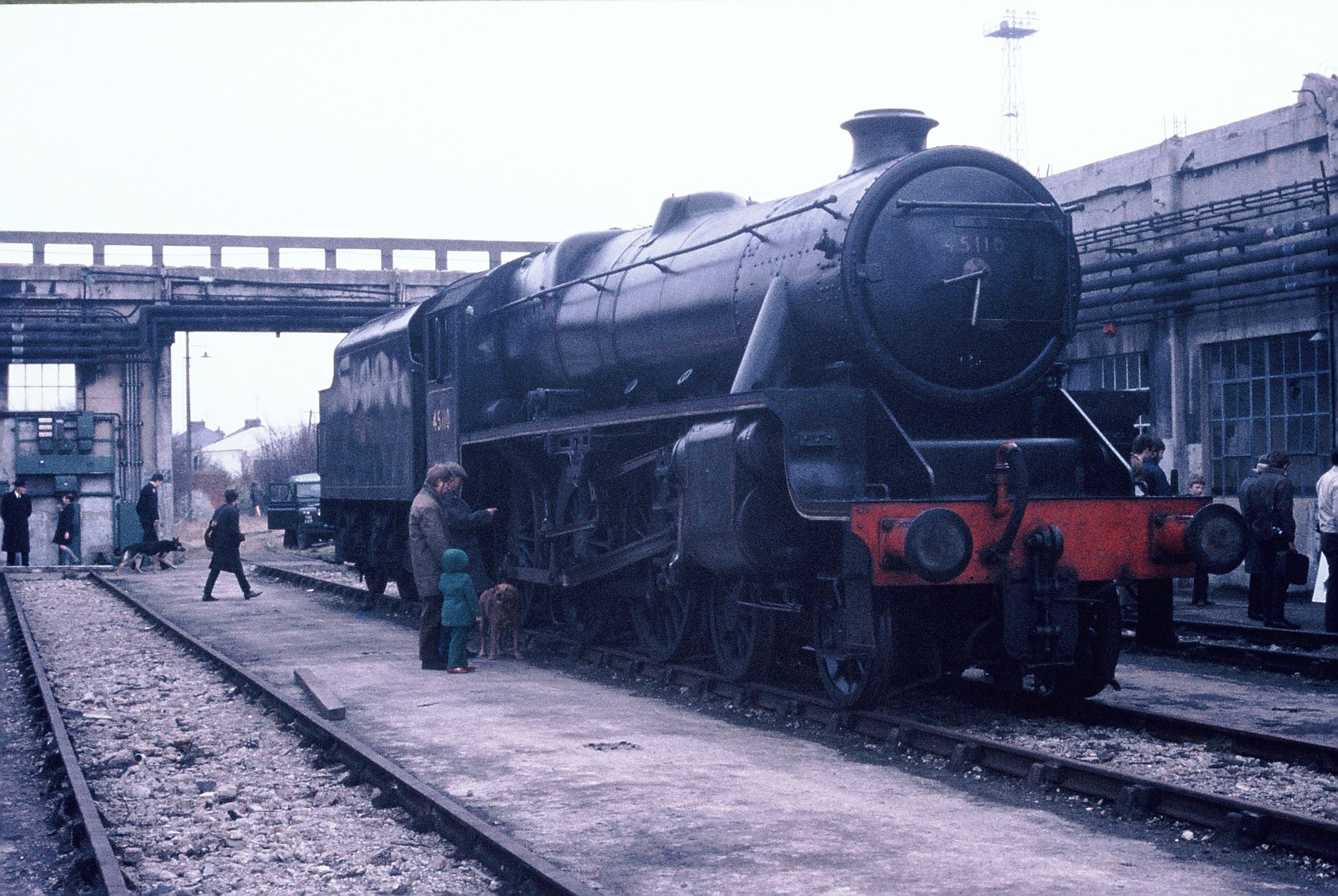
- Black Five 45110 at Ashford Steam Centre

- Ashford Steam Centre in Kent
- Established: 1968
- Dissolved: 1976
- Location: Willesborough, Ashford, Kent; TR 021 416
- Coordinates: 51°08′17″N 0°53′17″E
- Type: Operational railway museum
- Founder: Esmond Lewis-Evans
- Owner: British Railways Board

Ashford Steam Centre was a short-lived railway museum at Willesborough, Ashford, Kent, United Kingdom. It was located at the former engine shed that was situated east of Ashford railway station. The museum opened in 1968 and closed in 1976.

== History ==
Ashford Steam Centre was established by Esmond Lewis-Evans. It occupied the former engine shed that was located east of Ashford railway station. The shed, with its turntable, coaling stage and water tower had been built by the Southern Railway in 1931. It ceased to be used for the servicing of steam locomotives in June 1962, following which it was used to service diesel locomotives. The steam centre was established in 1968. On 11 April 1971, the Southern Electric Group organised the Man of Kent '71 railtour, which visited the steam centre. Class 71 locomotive E5005 and 4TC set 427 were used.

In 1974, the centre was open once a month, on the second Sunday of the month. At the time, there were around a dozen locomotives on site. Due to mounting debts, the steam centre was closed May 1976 and its rolling stock was dispersed. The engine shed and surrounding area were cleared in 1989, with the area being used for the storage of motor vehicles. Since 2005 most of the site has been sold for housing development.

== Rolling stock ==
The following items of rolling stock were based at Ashford Steam Centre.

=== Locomotives ===
Origin	Wheel arrangement	Class	Notes	Photograph
SECR	0-6-0	C	No 592. Moved to the Bluebell Railway post closure.	
SECR	0-4-4T	H	No. 263, running in plain green livery. Following closure, the locomotive was transferred to the Bluebell Railway.	
SR	4-6-2	MN	No 35028 Clan Line, running in full British Railways lined green livery.	
SR	4-6-0	N15	No 777 Sir Lamiel.	
SECR	0-6-0	O1	No. 65, running in plain green livery. Bought from British Railways by Lewis-Evans in 1968. Moved to a site in Kent post-closure, then to the Bluebell Railway in 1996.	
LMS	4-6-0	Black Five	No. 45110, running in British Railways black livery.	
Hawthorn Leslie	0-4-0ST		Acquired from Blue Circle, Swanscombe by the Gravesend Railway Enthusiast's Society. Moved to Colne Valley Railway in May 1976.	
Hawthorn Leslie	0-4-0ST	Munition	Singapore, Ex-HMNB Chatham. Moved to Rutland Railway Museum post-closure.	
CF du Nord	4-6-0	3.513	De Glehn compound No 3.628. Built in 1908 for the CF du Nord, which became part of SNCF on nationalisation. Imported from France in the early 1970s. To Nene Valley Railway post-closure, where it worked the inaugural train. Sold to the Science Museum, London but later sold to a private owner. The locomotive was returned to France for restoration at Longueville, Seine-et-Marne by AJECTA.	
NSB	2-6-0	NSB Class 21c	No. 376 King Haakon VII.	
		Fireless locomotive	Scrapped in 1984 in lieu of rent owed.	
Hudswell Clarke	0-6-0		D810 Enterprise, diesel-mechanical prototype of the Paxman Hi-Dyne engine Scrapped 1992	

=== Multiple units ===
Origin	Class	Notes	Photograph
SR	4RES	DMBTO No.11161. Returned to service in 2012 as part of 4COR unit 3402 on the East Kent Railway.	
SR	4DD	Unit No. 4902, British Rail blue livery. Three vehicles of a four-car unit, both driving vehicles and a trailer. The trailer was scrapped in 1984, in lieu of rent owed.	
SR	5BEL	Pullman Kitchen First No S280S Audrey. British Rail blue and grey livery. To East Somerset Railway in May 1978. Sold in 1980 for use in the Venice-Simplon Orient Express.	

=== Carriages ===
Origin	Number	Type	Notes	Photograph
SECR	950	Birdcage brake	Built for the South Eastern & Chatham Railway's boat trains, with the introduction of the new corridor boat train in the early years of the Southern Railway, it was then kept as a spare, downgraded to third class. It subsequently found use in one of the Eastern Section's 'long' sets until converted into a mess van on withdrawal. Moved to a farm near Ashford in 1983, then to the Bluebell Railway in September 1998. It is stored unserviceable on the Bluebell Railway.	
Pullman	No 243 Lucille	Parlour First	Built in 1928 by Metro Cammell for the LNER Queen of the Scots service. Transferred in 1963 to the Southern Region of British Railways for use on the Bournemouth Belle. Withdrawn in 1967 and arrived at Ashford the following year. Following closure, Lucille remained on site until she was sold in May 1985 for use on the Venice-Simplon Orient Express.	
Pullman	No 306 Orion		Built in 1951 for use on the Golden Arrow. Withdrawn on 1 October 1972 and arrived at Ashford later that month. Moved to Peco Modelrama, Beer, Devon post-closure.	
Pullman	No 238 Phyllis	Parlour First	Built for the LNER in 1928. Arrived at Ashford in 1968. Moved to Molash, Kent in 1983 and subsequently to Shottenden. Stored at the Bluebell Railway in 1997. Sold to the Venice-Simplon Orient Express in 2000.	
Pullman	No 43 Sapphire		Built for the SECR in 1910, rebuilt in 1937. To Lavender Line in 1984. Sold in 1988 to a private owner and used in a restaurant at Seaburn, Tyne and Wear.	
NSB	1001	Four-wheel brake	Moved to the Great Central Railway post-closure. Later moved to Bressingham, Norfolk.	

=== Other items of rolling stock ===
Origin	Number	Type	Notes	Photograph
Grafton		Self-propelled crane.		
		Six-wheeled van		
Smith's, Rodley		Steam crane.		
