= Wootton, Kent =

Village in Kent, England

Coordinates: 51.175°N 1.18°E

Wootton
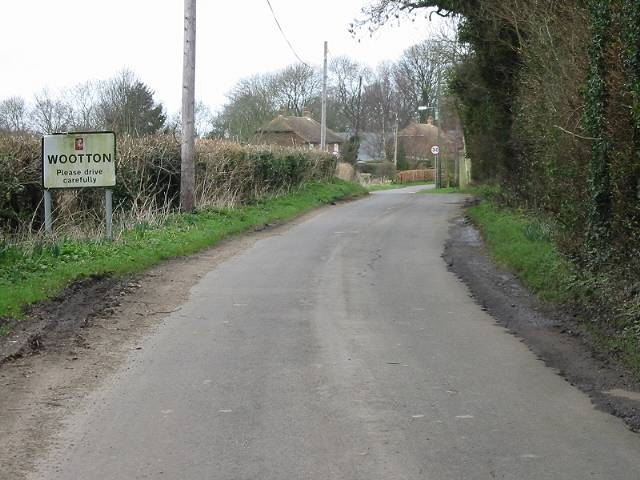
- Entering Wootton from the south

- Location within Kent
- Civil parish: Denton with Wootton
- District: Dover
- Shire county: Kent
- Region: South East
- Country: England
- Sovereign state: United Kingdom
- Post town: Canterbury
- Postcode district: CT4
- Police: Kent
- Fire: Kent
- Ambulance: South East Coast

Wootton is a village and former civil parish, now in the parish of Denton with Wootton, in the Dover district of Kent, England. In 1961 the parish had a population of 164.

The village is 7 miles (11 km) northwest from the channel port of Dover, and 30 miles (48 km) east-southeast from the county town of Maidstone. The major A2 London to Dover road is 1 mile (1.6 km) to the northeast. Denton, the other parish village, is 1 mile to the northwest.

== History ==
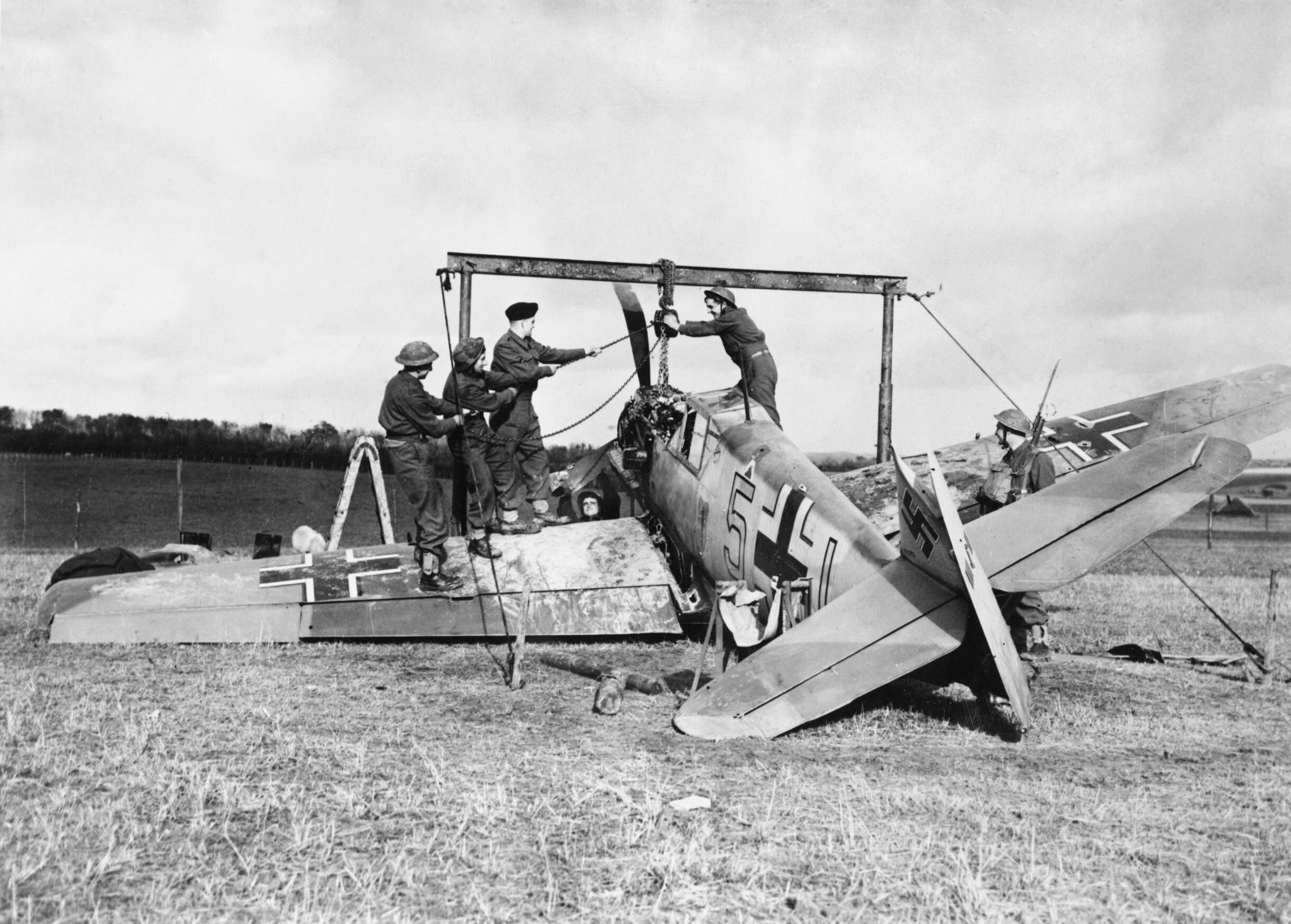
Messerschmitt Bf 109E-4 (W.Nr. 5153), flown by Oberleutnant Egon Troha, Staffelkapitän (StffKpt) of 9./JG 3, and which crash-landed near Wootton Cross Roads, Shepherdswell, on 29 October 1940

Wootton was the birthplace of the mathematician and surveyor Leonard Digges, who some claim invented a functioning telescope some time between 1540 and 1559.

It once had a Baptist chapel, linked to the Eythorne Baptist Church group. The worldwide known Lydden Hill Race Circuit, the so-called "Home of Rallycross", is located near Wootton village.

On 1 April 1963 the parish was abolished and merged with Denton to form "Denton with Wootton".
