= London Midland Region of British Railways =

British Rail operating region

- Region logo from 1965 to 1992.
- Franchise: Not subject to franchising (1 January 1948 – 31 December 1992)
- Main Regions: London, North West of England, West Midlands
- Parent company: British Rail

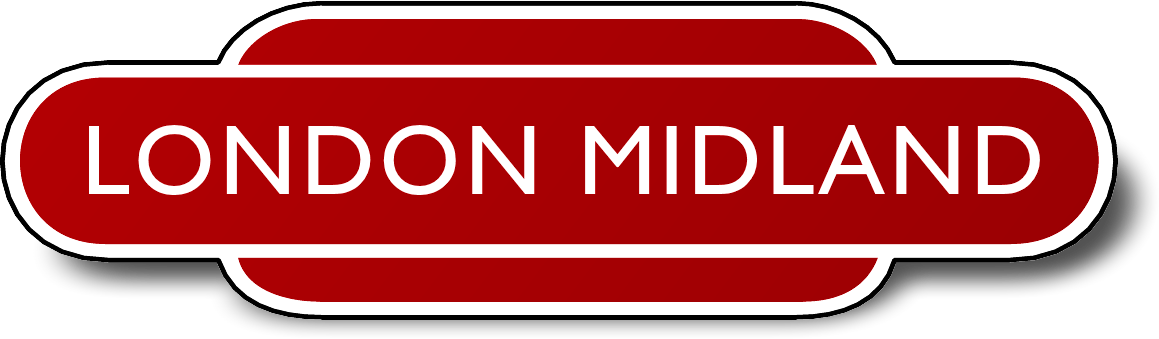
Station totem design prior to 1965

The London Midland Region (LMR) was one of the six regions created on the formation of the nationalised British Railways (BR), and initially consisted of ex-London, Midland and Scottish Railway (LMS) lines in England, Wales and Northern Ireland. The region was managed first from buildings adjacent to Euston station, and later from Stanier House in Birmingham. It existed from the creation of BR in 1948, ceased to be an operating unit in its own right in the 1980s, and was wound up at the end of 1992.

== Territory ==
At its inception, the LMR's territory consisted of ex-LMS lines in England and Wales. The Mersey Railway, which had avoided being "Grouped" with the LMS in 1923, also joined the LMR. The LMR's territory principally consisted of the West Coast Main Line (WCML), the Midland Main Line (MML) south of Carlisle, and the ex-Midland Cross Country route from Bristol to Leeds.

During the LMR's existence there were a number of transfers of territory to and from other regions. The major changes were:

- In 1949 the London, Tilbury and Southend line, which was completely cut off from the rest of the LMR network, transferred to the Eastern
- Also in 1949, the isolated from the rest of the LMR ex-LMS Northern Counties Committee railway lines in Northern Ireland were bought by the Ulster Transport Authority.
- In 1958 a major re-drawing of the regional boundaries took place. LMR lines in South Wales and south-west of Birmingham were transferred to the Western; lines in Lincolnshire and South Yorkshire went to the Eastern; in North and West Yorkshire to the North Eastern. In return, the London Midland gained the former Great Central Railway laying outside Yorkshire and Lincolnshire.
- In 1974, the Chiltern Main Line from London Marylebone to Banbury and Birmingham Moor Street was transferred to the LMR from the Western Region.

== Locomotives and rolling stock ==
The LMR inherited ex-LMS types of steam locomotive. For a few months in early 1948, an M prefix was added to existing LMS locomotive numbers. From mid-1948, 40000 was added, giving numbers of ex-LMS types in the 4XXXX and 5XXXX series. Some elderly locomotive classes were renumbered in the 58XXX series to make way for new production of LMS designs.

The LMR initially continued building ex-LMS stock, particularly Black Fives, Ivatt 2MT, two Duchesses, and rebuilds of Royal Scots and Patriots. Stanier "Period III" carriages continued to be built and were developed into a new style known as "Porthole" stock. Freight stock on order at Nationalisation was completed: some LMS designs were accepted as BR standard designs and continued to be built for the whole network through the 1950s and early 1960s.

The LMR had some experimental diesel locomotives, such as the Class D16/1 and "Fell locomotive" 10100.

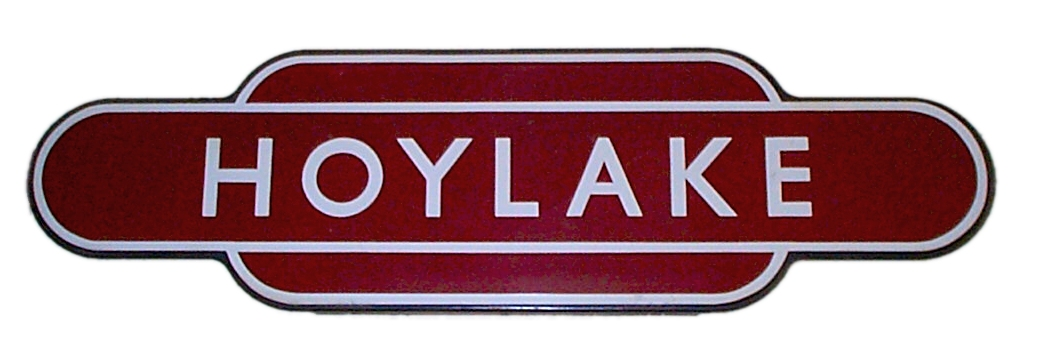
A totem station sign for Hoylake in Merseyside.

In August 1968 it was the last region of BR to eliminate steam traction under the 1955 Modernisation Plan.

== West Coast Main Line electrification ==
In the 1960s, the West Coast Main Line was electrified between London Euston and Crewe, Liverpool, Manchester and Birmingham. This was extended via Carlisle to Glasgow in the 1970s.
