= SR Class 6-PUL =

Class of electric rail cars in the UK

Southern Railway 6-PUL, 6-CIT, and 6-PAN
- In service: 1932–1969
- Manufacturers: Power cars: Metropolitan Cammell and BRCW; Standard trailer cars: SR Eastleigh Works, Pullman trailer cars: Metropolitan-Cammell
- Number built: 6-PUL: 20; 6-CIT: 3; 6-PAN: 17
- Number preserved: 2 Pullman trailer cars
- Number scrapped: All except 2 Pullman trailer cars
- Formation: See below
- Fleet numbers: "
- Operators: Southern Railway, British Railways
- Lines served: London to Brighton and Worthing

Specifications
- Car body construction: Power cars: All steel, Trailer cars: Steel panelled wooden body on steel underframe
- Traction system: Eight 225 hp (168 kW) traction motors
- Power output: 1,800 hp (1,342 kW)
- Electric system: 750 V DC
- Current collection: Third rail
- UIC classification: Bo′Bo′+2′2′+2′2′+2′2′+2′2′+Bo′Bo′
- Braking system: Automatic Air
- Coupling system: Screw-link
- Multiple working: Standard SR system
- Track gauge: 4 ft 8 1/2 in (1,435 mm)

The Southern Railway (SR) gave the designations 6-PUL, 6-CIT and 6-PAN to electric multiple units built to work the routes between London and Brighton, West Worthing and Eastbourne. None of these units survived long enough in British Rail ownership to be allocated a TOPS class number. The 6-PUL units were designated 6-COR until 1935 (the COR designation was later used for 4-COR units).

== Prototype cars 11001–11002 ==
Coach numbers 11001 and 11002 were prototype driving motor brake vehicles for the mainline stock that was being developed for the London to Brighton electrification. The first was built by the Birmingham Railway Carriage and Wagon Company (BRCW) and the second by Metropolitan Cammell Carriage and Wagon Company. Both were introduced in October 1931, and ran with three trailers converted from former London and South Western Railway carriages as unit number 2001.

After trials with this unit had been completed the set was disbanded, and the two prototype driving cars were reformed into 6-CIT units 2041 and 2042 respectively. Unit number 2001 was then reused for one of the production 6-PUL units.

== Construction ==
The 6-PUL (6-car Pullman stock, numbers 2001–2020) and 6-CIT (6-car City stock, numbers 2041–2043) units were built in 1932 to provide high quality accommodation on the newly electrified London to Brighton route. Units of both types each included a Pullman composite kitchen car, which were built by Metropolitan Cammell and numbered 256 to 278 in the Pullman Car Company series.

The 6-CIT units differed from the 6-PUL units only in that the three trailers other than the Pullman car had all first class accommodation. They were dedicated for use on the London Bridge to Brighton route (as opposed to the London Victoria route on which the 6-PUL units were used), and were intended for the trains used by City workers, hence their designation.

The 6-PAN (6-car Pantry units, numbers 2021–2037) units were introduced in 1935, upon the extension of the electrified network to Ore. They were similar to the 6-PUL units, except that the Pullman car was replaced by a first class dining car with a pantry. From this time, 12-car trains were often formed from a 6-PAN coupled to either a 6-PUL or 6-CIT.

Until the arrival of the 6-PAN units, the 6-PUL units had been referred to as 6-COR (6-car Corridor stock) and, as explained below, the designation COR was again used by this stock in later years for various reasons. The numbers of all three types of unit were revised in January 1937 from 20xx to 30xx.

== Formations ==
Initial formations of these units were as follows (coaches were not formed in numerical order):

Units	Type	DMBTO	Trailer	Trailer	Trailer	Trailer	DMBTO
2001–2020 (later 3001–3020)	6-PUL	11003 to 11045 (odds bar 11015/41)	TTK 10001 to 10020	TCK 11751 to 11789 (odds)	TPCK Pullman Car (see below)	TCK 11752 to 11790 (evens)	11004 to 11046 (evens bar 11016/42)
2021–2037 (later 3021–3037)	6-PAN	11047 to 11079 (odds)	TTK 10021 to 10053 (odds)	TFK 12260 to 12276	TFKP 12501 to 12517	TTK 10022 to 10054 (evens)	11048 to 11080 (evens)
2041–2043 (later 3041–3043)	6-CIT	11001, 11002, 11015	TFK 12251, 12254, 12257	TFK 12252, 12255, 12258	TPCK Pullman Car (See below)	TFK 12253, 12256, 12259	11041, 11042, 11016

The Pullman cars used in these sets were numbered and named as follows:

Number	Name	Unit	Number	Name	Unit	Number	Name	Unit	Number	Name	Unit
275	Anne	3001	256	Rita	3002	257	Grace	3003	260	Elinor	3004
263	Ida	3005	265	Rose	3006	266	Violet	3007	277	Lorna	3008
271	Alice	3009	274	Daisy	3010	276	Naomi	3011	278	Bertha	3012
258	Brenda	3013	259	Enid	3014	261	Joyce	3015	262	Iris	3016
264	Ruth	3017	267	May	3018	268	Peggy	3019	269	Clara	3020
272	Gwladys	3041	273	Olive	3042	270	Ethel	3043			

== Reformations and conversions ==
Between May 1942 and May 1946, the Pullman cars in these units were withdrawn and stored at the Pullman workshops in Brighton. This was part of the general withdrawal of Pullman and other restaurant and dining cars from railway stock during World War II. During this period, the 6-PUL and 6-CIT stock were referred to as 5-COR. When the Pullman cars were returned to service, not all were inserted into the same units that they had been in before the war. Those that were reformed were:

Number	Name	Unit	Number	Name	Unit	Number	Name	Unit	Number	Name	Unit
275	Anne	3012	256	Rita	3043	278	Bertha	3001	264	Ruth	3042
267	May	3041	272	Gwladys	3017	273	Olive	3002	270	Ethel	3018

During 1947 and 1948, the three 6-CIT units were converted to non-standard 6-PUL units by reclassifying their three Trailer First vehicles into a Trailer Third (numbered 10113–10115) and two Trailer Composites (11862–11867).

After the 6-PUL and 6-PAN units were disbanded, many of the carriages continued to run in service together with former 4-RES and 4-COR stock. These reformed units were classified either 4-PUL, 4-COR, 4-COR(N), 6-COR or 6-TC.

Units	Type	Period used	Formed from	Trailers
601	6-TC	1965–1967	COR/PAN/PUL cars	TTK/TCK/TTK/TTK
3041–3050	6-COR	1965–1966	PAN/PUL cars	TTK/TTK/TFK/TTK
3054–3059	4-PUL	1964–1968	6-PUL Pullman kitchen in RES unit	TFK/TPCK
3065–3071	4-COR(N)	1964–1969	6-PUL Trailer Third in RES unit	TFK/TTK
3159–3168	4-COR	1965–1969	PAN/PUL/RES cars	TFK/TTK

=== 6-TC ===
The 6-TC unit was formed in 1965 to trial push-pull equipment that would allow a diesel locomotive to be operated remotely from the driving cab in the multiple unit. It was composed of former 4Cor driving motor cars, which had their motors removed and the end gangways removed, and 6-PAN/6-PUL trailer cars. At the same time a Class 33 locomotive was modified to work with the unit.

From early 1966, the experimental train was used on the Oxted line, and was later transferred to the Clapham Junction to Kensington Olympia service. The trials were successful, and led to the production of the 3-TC and 4-TC units for working the Bournemouth line with Class 33/1 locomotives. However, the 6-TC unit had a short life, and was withdrawn after incurring accident damage.

== Accidents and incidents ==
- On 23 January 1948, a passenger train formed by a 6-PUL and a 6-PAN unit overran signals at London Bridge and collided with an empty stock train formed by two 6-PAN units. Three people were killed and 34 were injured.
- On 25 August 1958, 6-PUL unit No. 3014 and 6-PAN unit 3032 formed a passenger train that was involved in a head-on collision with a sleeper car train at Eastbourne, East Sussex after the latter overran a signal. Five people were killed and 40 were injured. Most of the cars in the electric train were damaged to some extent; cars 11027 and 10004, which were at the front of unit 3014, were written off. Unit 3032 was subsequently disbanded, with two cars, nos. 11074 and 10044, being used to return unit 3014 to service. Of the remaining four cars of unit 3032, car 10043 was scrapped later in 1958; car 11075 replaced 11074 in unit 3014 in January 1959; and cars 12271 and 12512 were scrapped at Newhaven in 1961.

== Preservation ==
Former 6-PUL Pullman cars 264 Ruth and 278 Bertha have been preserved, and are now used as ordinary locomotive-hauled Pullman cars. Number 264 is part of the Venice Simplon Orient Express fleet, working charter trains on the main line, while 278 is at Carnforth under private ownership.

The underframes of several PUL and PAN unit carriages were reused by the engineering department as long-welded rail carriers and crane runners.

Unit No.	Type	Coach Type	Number	Location	Notes	Photograph
-	6-PAN	Trailer Second Corridor	10027	Chasewater Railway	Underframe only	
-	6-PAN	Trailer Composite Corridor	12232	Midland Railway Centre	Underframe only	
-	6-PAN	Trailer First Corridor	12275	Spa Valley Railway	Underframe only	
-	6-PAN	Trailer First Corridor	12270	Keighley & Worth Valley Railway	Underframe only	
