= Paxman Hi-Dyne engine =

British experimental diesel engine

The Paxman Hi-Dyne engine was a form of experimental diesel engine developed for rail transport use by the British engine makers Paxman of Colchester. They used variable supercharging to give a constant power output across their speed range.

The name "Hi-Dyne" is a reference to dyne, a CGS unit of force, and implicitly to torque.

== Diesel-mechanical locomotives ==
Diesel locomotives appeared in the 1930s, after the availability of reliable, compact diesel engines. The first were low-speed shunters with mechanical transmissions. These were followed by more powerful high-speed express locomotives with diesel-electric transmissions. These electric transmissions and their traction motors were expensive and complicated though, often requiring entirely new skills for their maintenance staff. Although Föttinger's torque converter was in use in light diesel railcars, no high-power diesel-hydraulic transmission had yet been developed. There was a clear demand for a powerful and reliable diesel locomotive, based on a mechanical transmission.

One of the main needs for a transmission is to match the speed of the engine to the speed of the locomotive, so that the engine can work in its useful operating speed range. All locomotives need to deliver high torque from zero rail speed for startup. The overall range of gear ratios required from the transmission thus depends on the maximum speed of the train. The narrower the power band of the engine, the more precise control of gearbox ratio is required, either by using a continuously variable transmission or a discrete ratio transmission with more ratios.

Rather than building increasingly complicated transmissions, Paxman chose instead to develop a more flexible engine.

== Hi-Dyne principle ==
The output power of an engine is the product of its torque and speed. The torque varies with speed, increasing to a peak value and falling away both above and below this. The range for which the torque is a useful proportion of the maximum is described as the 'power band'. Diesel engines generally have a broader band than petrol engines and they also lose less fuel-efficiency at part throttle settings.

The Hi-Dyne principle was to produce an engine where the torque curve was the inverse of the usual: a maximum at low revolutions and decreasing gradually with increasing speed, so that the overall power (the product of torque and power) would remain constant, whatever the speed. Such an engine cannot be achieved by normally-aspirated engine design alone.

Experiments in supercharging diesel engines from the 1930s onwards, initially by Sulzer and Saurer, had shown that a robustly constructed diesel engine could be supercharged heavily, such that its output torque could become several times greater. The eventual limitation on this process became the engine's ability to extract power through the work done on the piston by the expanding gases. (Note: Above this, too much of the gas energy remains in the exhaust and cannot be extracted as useful work. One solution was the development of the turbo-compound engine, where a power recovery turbine extracts further work from this exhaust.)

By applying a turbocharger, it is possible to increase the torque (and thus power) at low speeds, so as to match the naturally-aspirated maximum power at the torque peak. If the turbocharger and its inlet manifold are carefully sized to provide the necessary boost at low pressure, but for the volume delivered to stay relatively constant above this, an inverse torque characteristic with rpm can be achieved.

== Engines ==
=== Fell locomotive ===
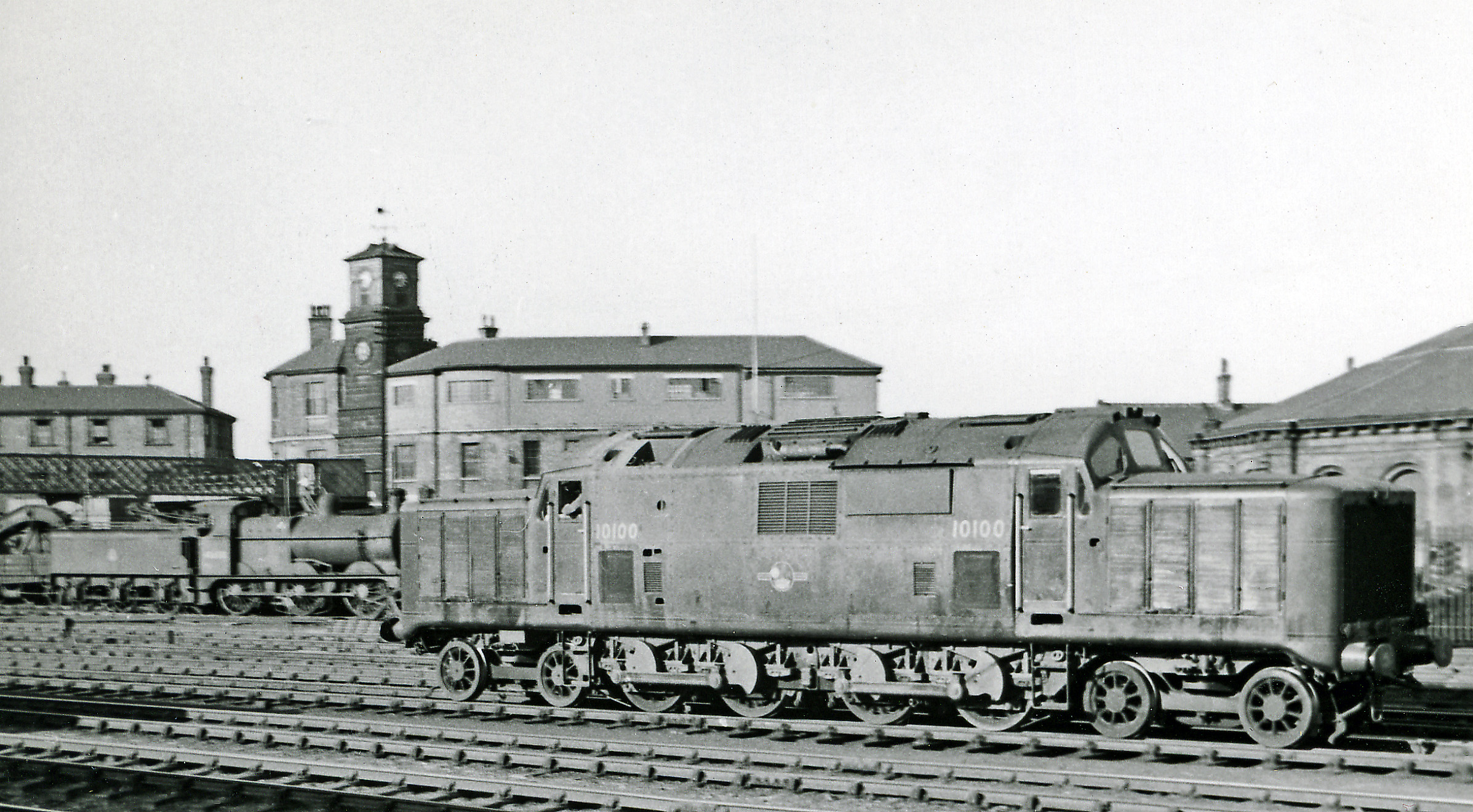
The Fell locomotive

The same concept of a constant-power diesel engine by variable supercharging had earlier (Note: The broad design for the Fell locomotive was established by the time of the 1947 agreement to build it. It first ran on the main line in 1951.) been used in the multi-engined 2,000 bhp (1,500 kW) mechanical transmission Fell locomotive (British Rail 10100). This used six engines in total: four Paxman 12RPH power engines and two AEC A210D engines solely to drive the Holmes-Connersville (Note: Holmes-Connersville, a joint venture between WC Holmes of Huddersfield, Yorkshire, who manufactured under licence some products of the Connersville Blower Company of Connersville, Indiana. Connersville refined the original Roots design and later merged with Roots (also of Connersville) to form the Roots Connersville Blower Company.) Roots superchargers. At low speeds, up to 24 mph (39 km/h), the four engines were brought into gear one-by-one. Above this speed, and up to the locomotive's maximum of 84 mph (135 km/h), the supercharger engine speed was controlled by a governor to maintain the supercharged mass-flow and thus maintain the output power as a constant. At full speed, the supercharging effect had been reduced to almost nothing, as the flow through the supercharger was now equivalent to the normal demand of the main engines at this speed. Although this system proved flexible in providing a smooth drive and was reliable in service, it had the drawbacks of complexity and also that the potentially more powerful engines were not working at their maximum when demands on the locomotive were at their maximum.

=== Hi-Dyne ===
The Hi-Dyne used a turbocharger characteristic curve that was adequate to provide full boost at low rpm, but was choked above this as engine speed increased, so that the boost reduced and thus also the output torque.

Engine fuel supply through the injection pump was controlled by a governor. Rather than the usual arrangement where a control input from the driver's lever sets an engine speed that is maintained by a governor, in the Hi-Dyne engine the control input selected an output power level, which was maintained by the governor.

== Applications ==
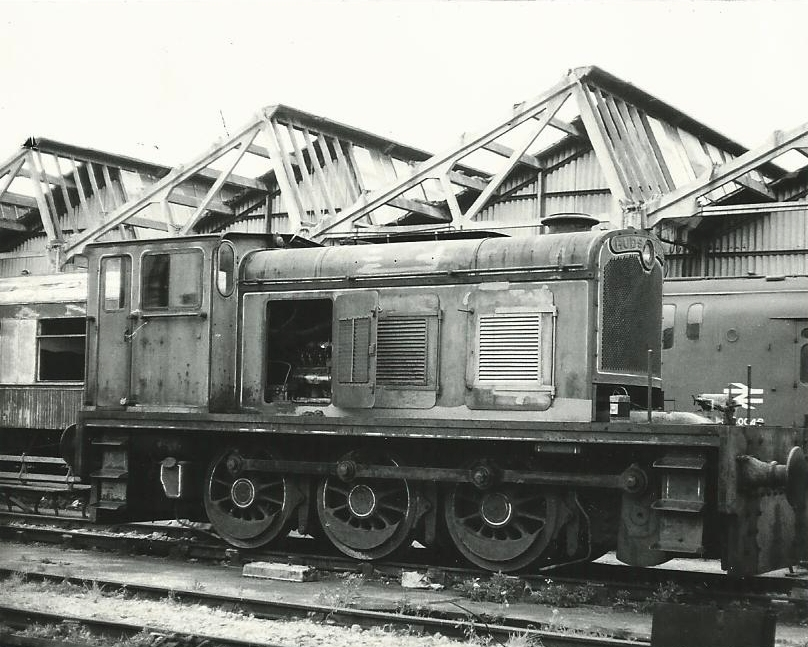
Hudswell Clarke D810 Enterprise at Ashford Steam Centre in 1972

In 1954 the first prototype Hi-Dyne was installed in Enterprise, a 48-ton Hudswell Clarke industrial locomotive. This was tested for a range of industrial uses, particularly for colliery traffic on the Stockton to Darlington line. Unusually for the testing of a small locomotive, the test trains also included a dynamometer car. The engine was a 6-cylinder RPHXL V engine fitted with a Brown Boveri VTR 160 turbocharger. The governor was set to give a constant power output of 210 bhp (160 kW) between 735 and 1,250 rpm. The transmission fitted was a three-speed Dual Fluidrive (Note: The Fluidrive Engineering Co. of Isleworth made fluid couplings that were used in many small British locomotives of the 1950s.) gearbox (a form of dual clutch transmission) with a pair of fluid couplings. This gearbox had the advantage that it avoided the momentary loss of power when changing gear. This was a valuable feature when light locomotives were starting heavy trains on inclines, as it helped to avoid the train running away from control.

One of the more lasting, although obscure, legacies of this locomotive was due to its name. This locomotive first appeared in 1954, during the construction of DP1, the prototype Class 55 Deltic. DP1 already had the internal project name Enterprise and it had been intended to name the locomotive similarly on its delivery. To avoid confusion with the Hudswell Clarke, and association of this prestige project with such a small and minor locomotive, DP1 instead acquired the name DELTIC, after its Deltic prime mover.

Paxman subsequently supplied sixteen Hi-Dyne engines, based on the 6-cylinder RPHXL (contracts 55096-103 and 55721-8) to Hudswell Clarke for locomotives for Sierra Leone Government Railways.

== Similar engines ==
Paxman was not alone in trying to develop diesel engines which gave high torque at low speed. Italian inventors Enrico Hocke and Fausto Zarlatti patented a "Diesel type locomotive with direct transmission and with automatically supercharged motor when decreasing the velocity" in 1938, patent US2115525.
