= Listed buildings in Denton with Wootton =

Historic structures in Kent, England

Denton with Wootton is a village and civil parish in the Dover District of Kent, England. It contains 37 listed buildings that are recorded in the National Heritage List for England. Of these four are grade II* and 33 are grade II.

This list is based on the information retrieved online from Historic England.

== Key ==
Grade	Criteria
I	Buildings that are of exceptional interest
II*	Particularly important buildings of more than special interest
II	Buildings that are of special interest

== Listing ==
Name	Grade	Location	Type	Completed (Note: The date given is the date used by Historic England as significant for the initial building or that of an important part in the structure's description.)	Date designated	Grid ref. (Note: The grid reference is based on the British national grid reference system, sometimes known as OSGB36, used by the Ordnance Survey.) Geo-coordinates	Notes	Entry number (Note: The "List Entry Number" is a unique number assigned to each listed building and scheduled monument by Historic England.)	Image	Wikidata
Granary About 5 Metres West of Lodge Lees Farmhouse	II				28 May 1987	TR2054247420; 51°11′00″N 1°09′16″E		1343688	Upload Photo	Q26627469
K6 Telephone Kiosk	II				11 May 1989	TR2155647217; 51°10′52″N 1°10′07″E		1249406	Upload Photo	Q26541541
1 and 2, Canterbury Road	II	1 and 2, Canterbury Road			28 May 1987	TR2157147063; 51°10′47″N 1°10′08″E		1070007	Upload Photo	Q26323508
Yew Tree Cottages	II	1 and 2, Canterbury Road			28 May 1987	TR2154647089; 51°10′48″N 1°10′06″E		1356148	Upload Photo	Q26638841
3 4 5, Canterbury Road	II	3 4 5, Canterbury Road			28 May 1987	TR2156547073; 51°10′48″N 1°10′07″E		1363376	Upload Photo	Q26645206
Monument to William Willats, About 5 Metres West of Church of St Mary	II	About 5 Metres West Of Church Of St Mary, Canterbury Road			28 May 1987	TR2162046714; 51°10′36″N 1°10′09″E		1363378	Upload Photo	Q26645207
Church of St Mary Magdalene	II*	Canterbury Road	church building		22 August 1962	TR2164246713; 51°10′36″N 1°10′11″E		1070009	Church of St Mary Magdalene More images	Q17557628
Denton Court and Entrance Court	II*	Canterbury Road	architectural structure		27 August 1952	TR2170046730; 51°10′36″N 1°10′14″E		1363377	Denton Court and Entrance Court More images	Q17557901
Keeper's Lodge	II	Canterbury Road			28 May 1987	TR2151645620; 51°10′01″N 1°10′02″E		1070010	Upload Photo	Q26323513
Lavender Cottage	II	Canterbury Road			27 August 1952	TR2152147246; 51°10′53″N 1°10′05″E		1070015	Upload Photo	Q26323520
Litttle Maydekin	II	Canterbury Road			27 August 1952	TR2165247528; 51°11′02″N 1°10′13″E		1356195	Upload Photo	Q26638883
Maydekin	II	Canterbury Road			27 August 1952	TR2158147456; 51°11′00″N 1°10′09″E		1070016	Upload Photo	Q26323522
Maydekin Cottage	II	Canterbury Road			22 December 1978	TR2157547364; 51°10′57″N 1°10′09″E		1068743	Upload Photo	Q26321437
Outbuilding About 80 Metres South East of Tappington Hall	II	Canterbury Road			28 May 1987	TR2103546161; 51°10′19″N 1°09′38″E		1070012	Upload Photo	Q26323515
Porch House	II	Canterbury Road			27 August 1952	TR2152247232; 51°10′53″N 1°10′06″E		1068730	Upload Photo	Q26321425
Tappington Hall	II*	Canterbury Road	house		27 August 1952	TR2100846239; 51°10′22″N 1°09′37″E		1070011	Tappington Hall More images	Q17557632
Thatched Cottage	II	Canterbury Road, Selsted			22 August 1962	TR2186745012; 51°09′41″N 1°10′18″E		1070019	Upload Photo	Q26323528
The Jackdaw Inn	II	Canterbury Road	pub		22 August 1962	TR2156647236; 51°10′53″N 1°10′08″E		1068642	The Jackdaw Inn More images	Q26321342
The Old Bakery	II	Canterbury Road	building		27 August 1952	TR2153047200; 51°10′52″N 1°10′06″E		1070014	The Old Bakery More images	Q26323519
The Old Rectory	II	Canterbury Road			22 August 1962	TR2157747273; 51°10′54″N 1°10′08″E		1070049	Upload Photo	Q26323582
The Post Office and Cottage Adjacent	II	Canterbury Road			28 May 1987	TR2156747085; 51°10′48″N 1°10′07″E		1363356	Upload Photo	Q26645187
The Yews	II	Canterbury Road			22 August 1962	TR2157147044; 51°10′47″N 1°10′08″E		1070008	Upload Photo	Q26323511
Rose Cottage	II	Denton Lane, Wootton, CT4 6RW			13 July 1979	TR2232046427; 51°10′26″N 1°10′45″E		1356110	Upload Photo	Q26638807
Geddinge Farmhouse	II	Geddinge			28 May 1987	TR2392746395; 51°10′23″N 1°12′07″E		1068762	Upload Photo	Q26321457
Stables About 20 Metres East of Geddinge Farmhouse	II	Geddinge			28 May 1987	TR2397246393; 51°10′22″N 1°12′10″E		1070017	Upload Photo	Q26323524
Lodge Lees Farmhouse	II	Lodge Lees			28 May 1987	TR2055147418; 51°11′00″N 1°09′16″E		1070018	Upload Photo	Q26323526
Shelvin Grove	II	Shelvin			22 August 1962	TR2232747225; 51°10′52″N 1°10′47″E		1356108	Upload Photo	Q26638805
Maryville	II	Shelvin Lane, Shelvin			14 March 1980	TR2214747523; 51°11′02″N 1°10′38″E		1084896	Upload Photo	Q26369686
Yew Tree Cottage	II	Shelvin Lane			28 May 1987	TR2221646620; 51°10′32″N 1°10′40″E		1363379	Upload Photo	Q26645208
Church of St Martin	II*	Wootton Lane	church building		22 August 1962	TR2250746547; 51°10′29″N 1°10′55″E		1363381	Church of St Martin More images	Q17557904
Court Lodge	II	Wootton Lane			8 September 1981	TR2237546458; 51°10′27″N 1°10′48″E		1068874	Upload Photo	Q26321567
Group of 3 Headstones About 1 to 5 Metres South of Church of St Martin	II	Wootton Lane			28 May 1987	TR2251746538; 51°10′29″N 1°10′55″E		1068883	Upload Photo	Q26321575
Pickleden Lodge	II	Wootton Lane			28 May 1987	TR2297946467; 51°10′26″N 1°11′19″E		1070022	Upload Photo	Q26323534
Street Farmhouse	II	Wootton Lane			28 May 1987	TR2227446220; 51°10′19″N 1°10′42″E		1070020	Upload Photo	Q26323530
The Endeavour Public House	II	Wootton Lane			14 October 1982	TR2237846433; 51°10′26″N 1°10′48″E		1070021	Upload Photo	Q26323532
The Old Rectory	II	Wootton Lane			28 May 1987	TR2235046326; 51°10′23″N 1°10′46″E		1363380	Upload Photo	Q26686940
Wootton House	II	Wootton Lane			28 May 1987	TR2235946383; 51°10′24″N 1°10′47″E		1068869	Upload Photo	Q26321563

== See also ==
- Grade I listed buildings in Kent
- Grade II* listed buildings in Kent

== Sources ==
- Newman, John (2013) [1969], Kent: North-East and East, The Buildings of England, New Haven and London: Yale University Press, ISBN 978-0-300-18506-5
