= SR Class 4-DD =

Experimental British electric railcar

Southern Railway 4-DD
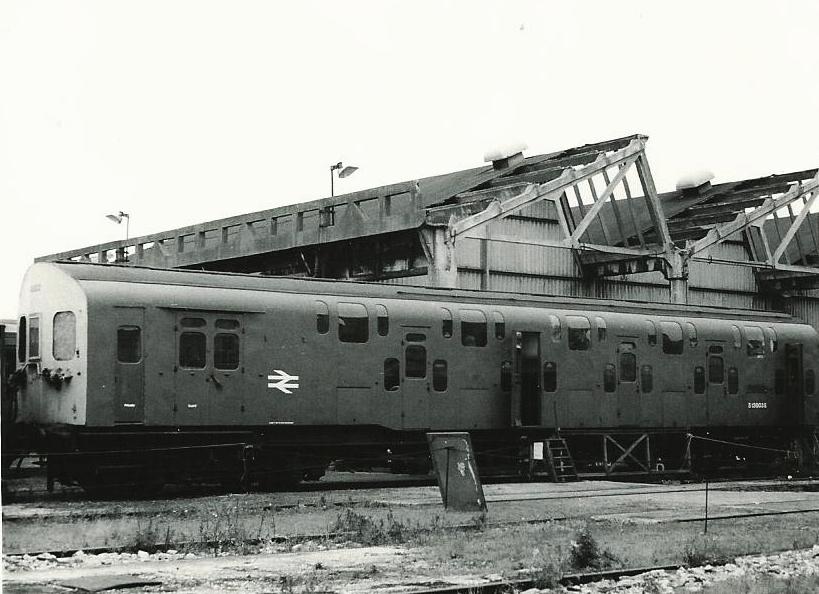
- Class 4-DD no 4902 in 1972
- In service: 1949–1971
- Constructed: 1949
- Number built: 2 sets (8 cars)
- Number preserved: 2 DMBTs
- Number scrapped: 2 DMBTs, all TTs
- Formation: DMBT-TT-TT-DMBT
- Fleet numbers: 4001-4002
- Capacity: 552 seated, 150 standing (per set)
- Operator: British Rail
- Line served: Charing Cross to Dartford

Specifications
- Train length: 257 ft 5 in (78.46 m)
- Width: 9 ft 3 in (2.82 m)
- Weight: 133 long tons 0 cwt (297,900 lb or 135.1 t)
- Traction system: English Electric
- Electric system: 750 V DC
- Current collection: Third rail
- Braking system: Electro-pneumatic
- Coupling system: Screw-link
- Track gauge: 4 ft 8 1/2 in (1,435 mm)

The SR Class 4-DD was an experimental double-decker electric multiple unit built in 1949 and operated by the Southern Region of British Railways until 1971. Conceived by Oliver Bulleid for the Southern Railway's commuter line from London Charing Cross to Dartford, the two trains were the only double-decker trains to be used on the mainline railway network in Britain. Whilst commonly used in continental Europe and North America, the restrictive railway loading gauge in the United Kingdom prohibits normal double-decker trains with two fully separated decks.

== History ==
The 4-DD was more split-level than truly double-deck because the compartments were alternately high and low to ensure that the overall height of the train was exactly within the clearances necessary to safely pass through tunnels and under bridges. A mock-up was displayed at London Marylebone in 1949 shortly before it was first introduced into service, but an assessment after one year in service revealed that the design would not be the optimum solution to the problems of overcrowding, nor would it help increase capacity, and the decision was made to extend trains from eight coaches to ten coaches by using regular, single-decker multiple units.

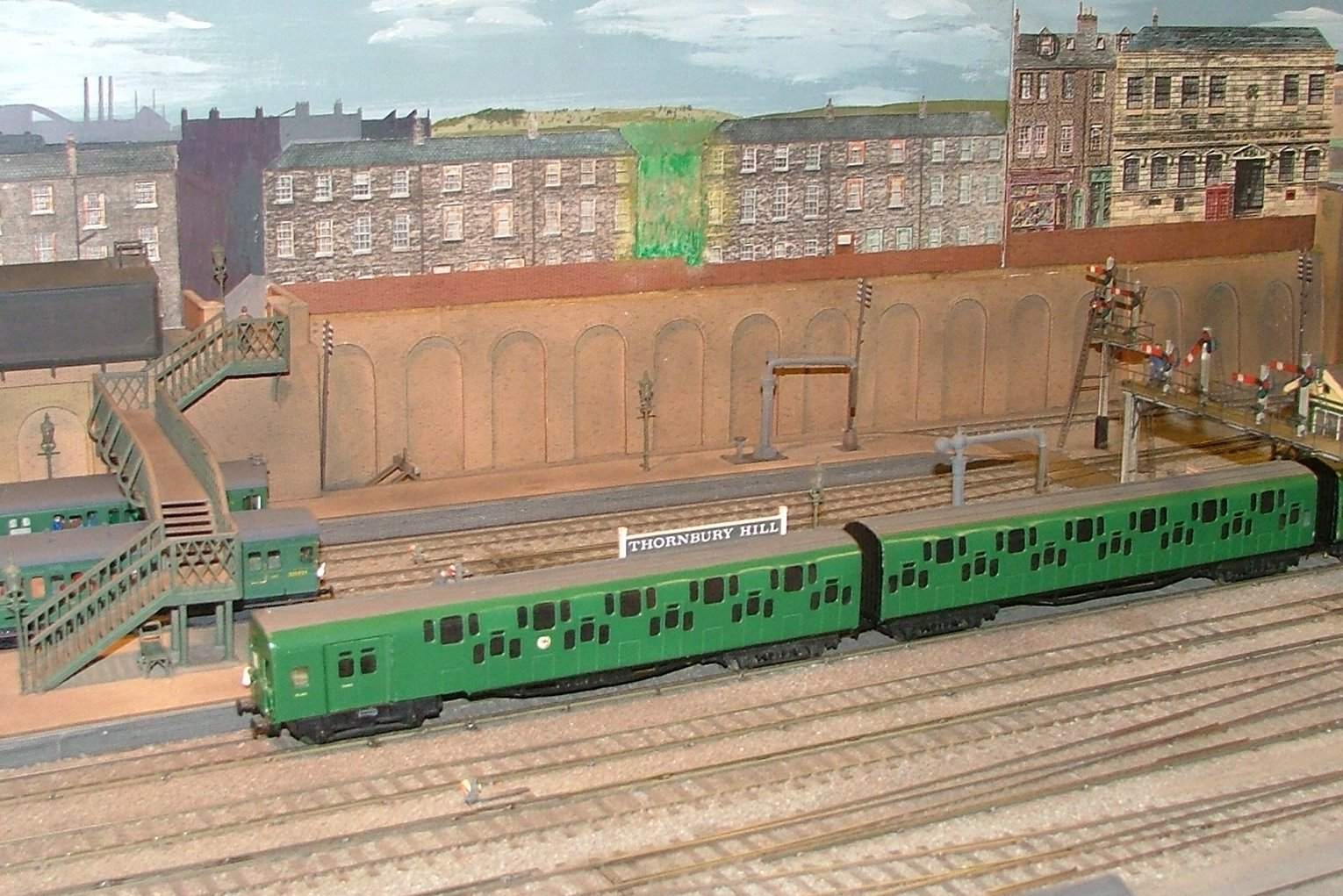
A model of the SR Class 4-DD

The intention to carry more passengers in a train of the same length as other contemporary stock was met, with the two 4-DD units having 1,104 seats compared to 800 in other units of similar age. However it was found that the additional number of passengers meant longer time spent at stations to allow passengers to get on and off. In practice, the upper compartments were cramped and poorly ventilated because the upper-level windows were impossible to open due to tight clearance. To resolve this problem, the compartments were pressure-ventilated, but the equipment proved to be unreliable.

Near the end, they were renumbered 4901 and 4902. 4001 and 4002 were reassigned to another pair of prototype Southern Region four-coach EMUs, the 4-PEPs.

Unusually for an "experiment" they lasted in traffic from 1949 to 1971, undergoing routine maintenance and repaints with no hiccups in their life. The two units were finally withdrawn on 1 October 1971 having travelled approximately 700,000 miles (1,100,000 km) in service.

== Formations ==
Key:	Scrapped	Preserved

Unit Numbers		DMBT	TT	TT	DMBT	Notes
Initial number	Final Number	DMBT	TT	TT	DMBT	Notes
4001	4901	13001	13501	13502	13002	(built September 1949)
4002	4902	13003	13503	13504	13004	(built October 1949)

== Preservation ==
Driving motor cars 13003 and 13004 survive, the former at Kent Locomotives Ltd - Sellindge, Kent, and the latter at the Northamptonshire Ironstone Railway Trust. 13004 was moved to Kent by the Bulleid 4-DD group to join 13003 in May 2023. One trailer was also preserved, but it was scrapped when Ashford Steam Centre closed in 1984, in lieu of rent owed. Driving motor cars 13003 and 13004 are now (May 2023) both in the care of Bulleid 4-DD Group, which is restoring one of them.
