= Coldred =

Small settlement in Kent, England

Coordinates: 51.182°N 1.252°E

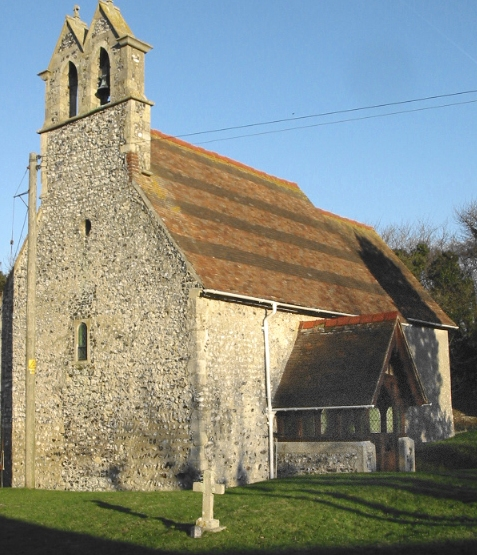
- St Pancras, Coldred's Grade I listed Saxon church

- Location within Kent
- OS grid reference: TR 274 475
- Civil parish: Shepherdswell with Coldred
- District: Dover
- Shire county: Kent
- Region: South East
- Country: England
- Sovereign state: United Kingdom
- Post town: Dover
- Postcode district: CT15
- Police: Kent
- Fire: Kent
- Ambulance: South East Coast

Coldred is a settlement and former civil parish, now in the parish of Shepherdswell with Coldred, in the Dover district of Kent, England. The main part of the village is Coldred Street which lies 1/2 mile (0.80 km) to the south-west. In 1961 the parish had a population of 153.

== Name ==
There are various competing views of the origin of the name. Based on the Domesday Book entry, the Oxford Dictionary of Place Names gives "Clearing where coal is found, or where charcoal is made. OE col + *ryde". This is also quoted by the village website which lists the variant names of "Coeldred", "Coelret" and "Colret". Hastead thought that the name was from its "cold and bleak situation" though he mentioned that it might be named after Ceolred of Mercia (Note: Called "Ceoldred" in Hasted's original) who may have visited the place in 715.

== History ==
The documentary history for early times appears to be fairly sparse. Early Archaeological finds indicate that there was Roman activity in the area and the finding of calcined bones and urns together may indicate pre-Christian Roman burials. The Dover Express and East Kent News mentions "history of Caesar's movements" as the origin of the earthworks, but unfortunately doesn't state where this supposition comes from. The Anglo-Saxon chronicle for 715 does state "Her Ine & Ceolred fuhton æt Woddes beorge". (Note: "There Ine and Ceolred fought at Woden's hill.") Unfortunately there are a number of locations that this could be, one is Adam's Grave in Wiltshire, but local tradition is that it was Woodnesborough near Sandwich, Kent. The latter is about 12 miles (19 km) to the north-north-east. The tradition is that "it is quite probable there was a further fight at Coldred, which is a position which may be regarded as an outpost of Dover".

Following the Norman Conquest in 1066 the manor fell into the hands of Odo, Earl of Kent, Bishop of Bayeux and half brother of William I. The entry in the Domesday book (below) reflects this though four years later at the trial of Penenden Heath he was deprived of the manor and it reverted to the crown. Tha manor was granted to the Saye family who passed it to The Hospital of St Mary, Domus Dei, or Maison Dieu in nearby Dover. Following the dissolution of the monasteries it passed back into the King's hands who granted it to Thomas Culpeper. Following his execution it passed through King Henry VIII's hands to Sir John Gage who in turn passed it to the Archbishop of Canterbury. The manor was leased out by the Ecclesiastical Commissioners.

Some years before 1800 the earth gave way in the middle of the public road. A well c.300 feet (91 m) deep was discovered. As with much else as Coldred there is a debate over this. Hasted in 1800 gives the first mention and fixes the date of the discovery. He connects it with the supposed Roman activity. The Dover Express notes that the well affords a good supply of water and that it "was sunk to supply the needs of the ancient encampment, a circumstance which points to the existence of a permanent station, such as would have been formed by the Romans rather than an earthwork thrown up for a casual conflict like that between Ceoldred and Ina. Tatton-Brown notes the well and cites Hasted. He is undecided as to whether it is "the original castle well, or Roman".

About 1/2 mile (0.80 km) to the southeast is the site of the former Guildford Colliery. Sinking started in 1906 but the colliery was never successful and closed in 1921. It was served by a spur from the East Kent Light Railway. The track has now been lifted but the embankment is still clearly visible starting north of the church and forming an arc to the west before bisecting the road between Coldred and Coldred Street.

On 1 April 1963 the parish was abolished and merged with Sibertswold to form "Shepherdswell with Coldred".

=== Domesday Book ===
The Domesday Book entry for Coldred (in Sankaran's translation) reads:

Ralph of Courbépine holds COLDRED from the Bishop. (Note: Odo of Bayeux) Land for ... In lordship 1 1/2 ploughs. 6 villagers with 7 smallholdings have 2 ploughs. 2 slaves; meadow 4 acres. It answers for 2 sulungs. Value before 1066 £8; later 20s; now £6. Molleva held it from King Edward.

The Latin gives the name as "COLRET".

=== St Pancras' Church ===
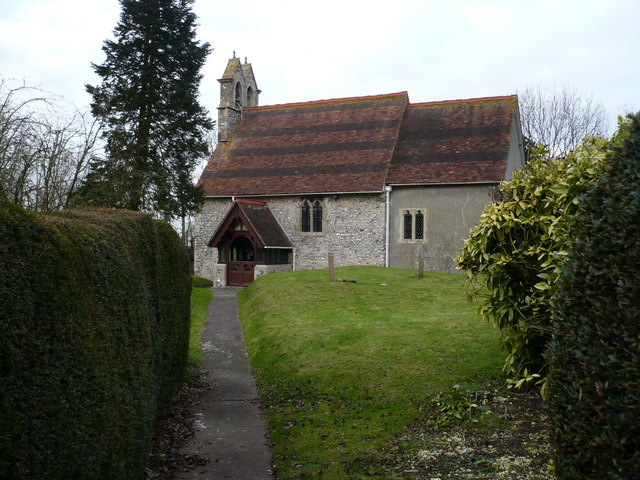
St. Pancras Church, Coldred - geograph.org.uk - 643654

St Pancras' Church is a grade I listed building number 1069988.

Churches dedicated to St Pancras are uncommon in England, there only being six. There is one other St Pancras church in Kent, the very early Saxon church of St Augustine's Abbey, Canterbury.

The listing for the parish church accepts that it is a Saxon church. Evidence such as the form of the windows and their heads and the structure of the nave and chancel walls are cited. In the 11th century alterations were made, possibly at that time the flint quoins were replaced by ashlar blocks.

Tatton-Brown in his 1992 survey and report to the Kent Archaeological Society disagrees with this. He dates the original structure to the late 11th century. He states that there is no evidence of pre-Norman work, citing the absence of any mention in the Domesday Book entry.

In the 14th century two windows were inserted into the nave walls. The south doorway was added at this time, and it is possible that the original door is still in place, though traces of earlier zig-zag moulding are above it. Also at this time the original west end bell cote was built. In the 15th century a two-light window was added to the south chancel wall.

Further restoration occurred in 1866, 1890 (when the porch and vestry were added) and 1923 (when the bell-cote was rebuilt). The vestry has a reset medieval dedication cross. The 19th century changes included inserting the decorated style east window.

The interior is mainly of 19th century origin, with the exception of the aumbrey in the north chancel wall.

The church houses one of the oldest bells in Kent, that of c.1175 – 1200. The bell (1 long cwt 3 qr [200 lb or 90 kg] approx) was noted as badly cracked and stored in the church in 1887. However the plaque by the bell states that it broke in two on Maundy Thursday, 6 April 1939. It was replaced in 1939.

=== Coldred Court farmhouse ===
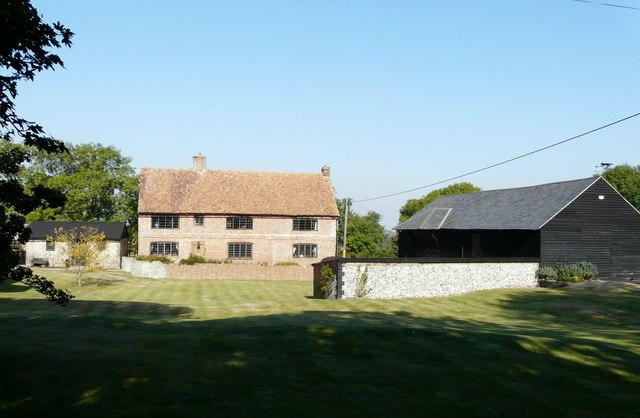
Coldred Court Farm - geograph.org.uk - 1514480

The farmhouse is a grade II listed building (number 1049087) southwest of the church. The listing notes that it is a 15 century timber framed building clad in 17 century red brick. Internally the timber frame is freestanding and visible within the later brick skin. It is within a moated manorial site.

=== Ringwork and Bailey ===
Surrounding the church is an earthwork which is a scheduled monument number 1012260. The scheduling statement for it describes it as late Anglo-Saxon to the later 12th century ringwork. The listing statement for the church gives the date as "indeterminate, but possibly Roman". Tatton-Brown refers to it thus: "The whole of the curving northern boundary of the churchyard is the outer bailey bank of the early Norman motte and bailey castle". Hasted reports the local tradition that it was built by Ceoldred of Mercia (Note: Now rendered as Ceolred of Mercia) in 715. As evidence he cites the Anglo-Saxon chronicle which mentions that Ceoldred fought a battle with Ina, king of the West Saxons (Note: Also spelled Ine) in 715 nearby. However Hasted then says that "it probably may be of Roman original, whatever use might be made of it afterwards" after mentioning Roman finds in the area. This account is repeated in a series of articles published in the local paper a hundred years later.

Whatever the original use, the extant remains are of the ringwork. Ringworks are a small fortified area, usually with a ditch, bank and palisade. There are only 200 recorded ringworks in England. Of these less than 60 have a bailey or outer less well defended area. The designation states: "as one of a limited number and very restricted range of Anglo-Saxon and Norman fortifications, ringworks are of particular significance to our understanding of the period". The Coldred example is further notable for its association with Odo of Bayeux and the early chapel.

The north-west of the ringwork today is a bank of up to 2.5 metres (8 ft 2 in) high with a ditch on the outside up to 2 metres (6 ft 7 in) deep. Some farm buildings dating from both medieval and more modern times have been built some of the earthworks. Originally this would have been the site of the residential buildings. The bailey was to the south-east and here the bank is 14 metres (46 ft) wide, 3 metres (9.8 ft) high and the ditch nearly 4 metres (13 ft) deep. This area would have been the stables, workshops and barracks. To the north of this area the ditch has been partially filled in, but a low outer bank is also visible.

== Citations ==
- Chapman, Marjorie (1996), Coldred Chronicle (PDF)
- Coldred Village (2017), Welcome to the Coldred Village Website
- Dover Express (13 September 1901), "Coldred", The Dover Express and East Kent News
- Hasted, Edward (1800), "Parishes: Coldred", The History and Topographical Survey of the County of Kent, vol. 9, Canterbury: W Bristow, pp. 385–393
- Historic England (22 August 1962), "Church of St Pancras (Grade I) (1069988)", National Heritage List for England
- Historic England (22 August 1962), "Coldred Court Farmhouse (Grade II) (1049087)", National Heritage List for England
- Historic England (17 November 1960), "Ringwork and bailey at Coldred Court (1012260)", National Heritage List for England
- Love, Dickon (28 June 2020), "Coldred, St Pancras", Love's Guide to the Church Bells of Kent
- Mills, A D (2011), A Dictionary of English Place Names, Oxford University Press, ISBN 9780199609086
- Morris, John, ed. (1975), Domesday book, History from the sources, vol. 1: Kent, Chichester: Phillimore, ISBN 978-0-85033-154-7
- Tatton-Brown, Tim (1992), "St Pancras Church, Coldred", Kent Archaeology Society
