= Denton, Kent =

Village in Kent, England

Coordinates: 51.1812°N 1.1686°E

Denton
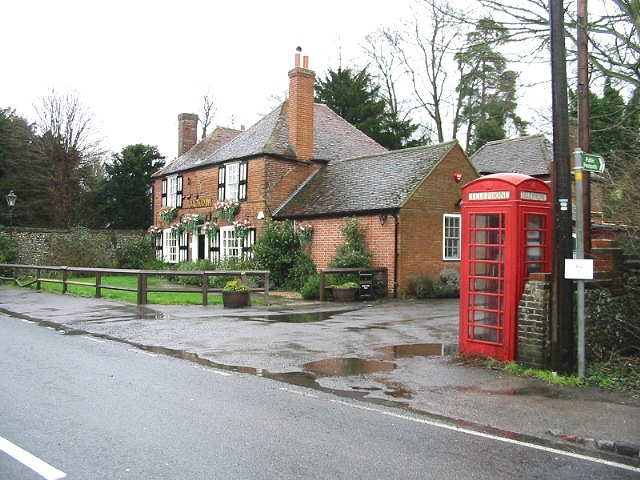
- The Jackdaw Inn, Denton

- Location within Kent
- OS grid reference: TR2147
- Civil parish: Denton with Wootton
- District: Dover
- Shire county: Kent
- Region: South East
- Country: England
- Sovereign state: United Kingdom
- Post town: Canterbury
- Postcode district: CT4
- Police: Kent
- Fire: Kent
- Ambulance: South East Coast

Denton is a village and former civil parish, now in the parish of Denton with Wootton, in the Dover district of Kent, England. In 1961 the parish had a population of 137. On 1 April 1961 the parish was abolished and merged with Wootton to form "Denton with Wootton".

The village is 7 miles (11 km) northwest from the channel port of Dover, and 30 miles (48 km) east-southeast from the county town of Maidstone. The A260 Barham to Folkestone road runs through the village, and the major A2 London to Dover road is 1 mile (1.6 km) to the east. Wootton, the other parish village, is 1 mile to the southeast.

To the southwest of the village is the Grade II* listed Jacobean timber framed Tappington (or Tappington-Everard) Hall which dates to the 16th century. The house is where the cleric Richard Barham (1788–1845), under the pen name Thomas Ingoldsby, wrote The Ingoldsby Legends.

Field Marshal Lord Kitchener was created Baron Denton, of Denton in the County of Kent, on 27 July 1914.
