= Denton with Wootton =

Civil parish in Kent, England

Coordinates: 51.168°N 1.1787°E

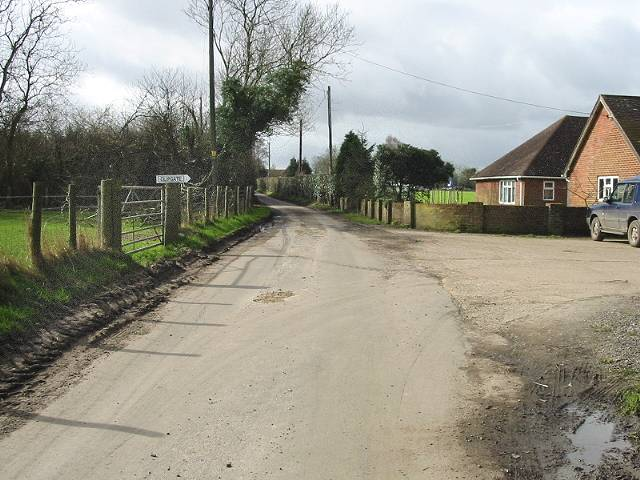
- A country lane at the north of the parish

- Location within Kent
- Population: 372 (2011 Census)
- Civil parish: Denton with Wootton
- District: Dover
- Shire county: Kent
- Region: South East
- Country: England
- Sovereign state: United Kingdom
- Post town: Canterbury
- Postcode district: CT4
- Police: Kent
- Fire: Kent
- Ambulance: South East Coast

Denton with Wootton is a civil parish in the Dover District of Kent, England. The parish contains the settlements of Denton and Wootton, 1 mile (1.6 km) apart. In 2011 it had a population of 372.

Denton with Wootton is approximately 30 miles (48 km) east-southeast from the county town of Maidstone. The south of the parish is 6 miles (10 km) north-west from the channel port of Dover, and the north, 7 miles (11 km) south-east from Canterbury. The A260 Barham to Folkestone road runs through the parish, and a 1 mile (1.6 km) section of the major A2 London to Dover road is part of the parish at the east.

Parishes surrounding Denton with Wootton are Barham at the north; Shepherdswell with Coldred at the north-east; Lydden at the south-east; Swingfield at the south; Acrise at the south-west; and Elham at the west.

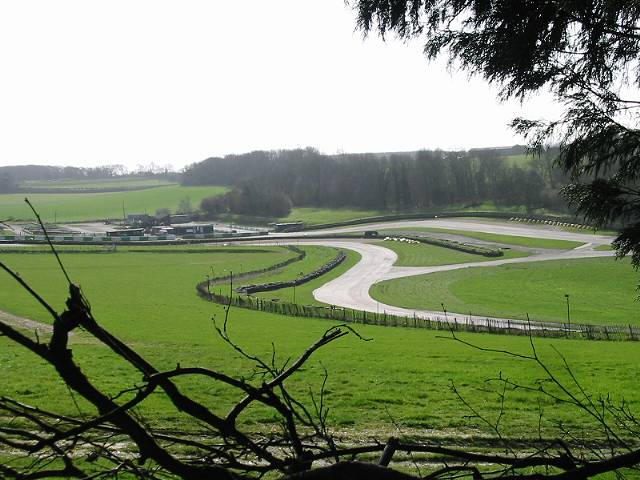
Lydden Hill Race Circuit

The Lydden Hill Race Circuit is within the eastern border of Denton with Wootton.

There are two parish churches: St Martin's in Wootton, and St Mary Magdalene's in Denton.

Historically Denton and Wootton contained two manors each: Denton and Tappington at Denton; Wootton and Wickham Bushes at Wootton.

== See also ==
- Listed buildings in Denton with Wootton
