= Eythorne Baptist Church =

Coordinates: 51°11′54″N 1°15′59″E

Eythorne Baptist Church originated in the meetings of early 16th century Baptists who had crossed the English Channel from the Low Countries to Kent to escape persecution. Nineteenth-century Baptist writer J. J. Goadby named Eythorne as one of the three "most ancient Baptist churches in England".

For many years the Church had associated village chapels in east Kent. Two of these remain—at Adisham and Nonington. Others were at Eastry, Ashley, Woolage Green, Wootton and Barnsole.

== Beginnings ==
The immigrant Baptists and their English supporters held meetings at Eythorne and also at Canterbury, about 12 miles (19 km) away. Joan Boucher, or Bocher, was known to have been involved in "reforming circles" in Canterbury is said by "uninterrupted and uncontradicted tradition" to have been an early member of the church at Eythorne. She was burnt at the stake at Smithfield on 2 May 1550 after refusing to recant her views on the incarnation of Christ. Soon afterwards, the Duke of Northumberland, one of the king's advisers, expressed concern about the "Anabaptists lately sprung up in Kent".

== 18th and 19th centuries ==
The first recorded meeting house in Eythorne and was probably built about 1755 with seats for 60 people; in 1773 it was doubled in size. In 1786 baptisms started to take place in the village itself, a change from the previous custom of baptising church members in the sea or river at Sandwich.

Until 1750 the church seems to have forbidden singing, but half a century later a retired Dover banker, Peter Fector, apparently objected to hearing the congregation's singing. In January 1804 church members gathered to discuss his offer of £500 for the old meeting house along with an acre of land to build a new chapel. This chapel, which is in use today, was built and opened within the same year.

In the late 1830s William Copley, husband of the writer Esther Copley (née Beuzeville, previous married name Hewlett), became Baptist Minister in Eythorne. Though his ministry started well he developed problems, apparently alcoholism, which meant his wife had to support his work and help write his sermons. Esther stayed on in Eythorne when William left in 1843 and is buried at Eythorne under a tree near the gate.
