= British Rail 10100 =

Early diesel railroad locomotive prototype

British Railways 10100
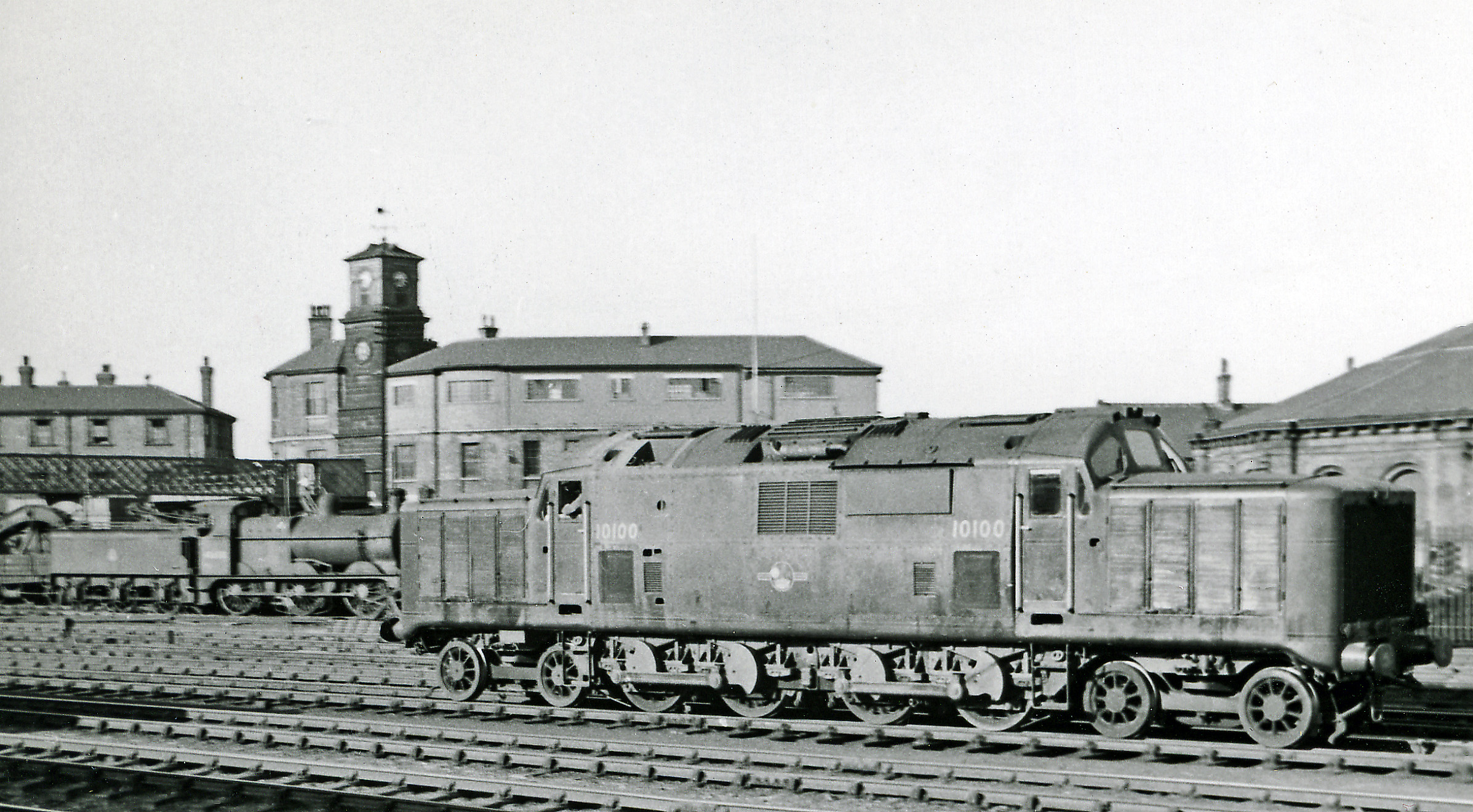
- The Fell Diesel at Derby Works in 1957
Type and origin
- Power type: Diesel-mechanical
- Builder: LMS, Derby Works
- Build date: 1951
Specifications
- Configuration
  - Whyte: 4-8-4DM
  - UIC: 2′D2′
- Gauge: 4 ft 8 1/2 in (1,435 mm) standard gauge
- Leading dia.: 39 in (0.991 m)
- Driver dia.: 51 in (1.295 m)
- Minimum curve: 5 chains (101 m)
- Wheelbase: 41 ft 4 in (12.60 m)
- Length: 50 ft 0 in (15.24 m)
- Width: 9 ft 0 in (2.74 m)
- Height: 13 ft 0 in (3.96 m)
- Loco weight: 120 long tons (122 t; 134 short tons)
- Fuel capacity: 720 imp gal (3,300 L; 860 US gal)
- Coolant cap.: 60 imp gal (270 L; 72 US gal)
- Water cap.: 500 imp gal (2,300 L; 600 US gal)
- Prime mover: Paxman 12RPH, x 4
- Cylinder size: 7 in × 7 3/4 in (178 mm × 197 mm)
- Transmission: Vulcan Sinclair SCRD fluid; Fell central gearbox
- Train heating: Steam generator
- Train brakes: Vacuum
Performance figures
- Maximum speed: 84 mph (135 km/h)
- Power output: 2,000 bhp (1,500 kW) at 1,500 rpm
- Tractive effort: 25,000 lbf (111 kN)
- Brakeforce: 38 long tons-force (380 kN)
Career
- Operators: British Railways
- Power class: 6P5F, later Type 4
- Numbers: 10100
- Nicknames: Fell Diesel Locomotive
- Withdrawn: 15 October 1958
- Scrapped: Derby Works, July 1960

British Railways 10100 was an unusual experimental diesel locomotive known informally as the Fell diesel locomotive, after Lt Col L. F. R. Fell who was one of the designers. It was the joint production of Davey Paxman & Co, Shell Refining & Marketing Co and Lt Col L. F. R. Fell, built for them by the London, Midland and Scottish Railway at Derby. Sir Harry Ricardo was also involved. By the time it emerged in 1950, nationalisation had taken place and it carried British Railways livery. The locomotive had six diesel engines, four of them used for traction. There were two auxiliary engines, both of which were 150 hp (110 kW) AEC 6-cylinder units, and these drove the superchargers for the main engines and the purpose of this arrangement was to enable the main engines to deliver very high torque at low crankshaft speed.

== Design ==
The design for 10100, a collaboration between Fell Developments Ltd and H. G. Ivatt of the LMS, aimed to address several of the weaknesses perceived of diesel powered rail traction. Weight was reduced by using several small engines, meaning that both the engines and their supporting structure could be lighter. This was also expected to save time in maintenance as an individual diesel engine could be exchanged more easily and with lighter equipment.

== Transmission ==
Using differential gearing to transmit the power, it was built as a 4-8-4 with the coupling rods connecting the centre four pairs of driving wheels. The coupling rods between the innermost axles were later removed, but as the four axles were driven by a single gearbox, it remained a 4-8-4. At 2,000 hp (1,500 kW) it was the most powerful of BR's non-steam locomotives at the time. From 1951 it worked the expresses from Manchester to London, proving some 25% more powerful than 5XP 4-6-0s. While the mechanical transmission made it much lighter than diesel-electric locomotives of the time, its complicated mechanism made it difficult to maintain.

The locomotive had four main Paxman 12RPH 12-cylinder engines, each producing 500 brake horsepower at 1,500 rpm. Each engine was connected to the gearbox via a hydraulic coupling, which could be filled with oil to transmit power or drained to disconnect that engine from the transmission. The engine outputs were combined in pairs by two sets of differential gearing, and the output shafts from these two gearsets were then combined by a third differential gearset to drive the main output shaft. Each differential input shaft was provided with a mechanism to prevent backwards rotation when the couplings were drained. Since this could cause the drive mechanism to lock up if the locomotive were to be pushed backward a vacuum-operated clutch was included in the geartrain.

The effect of this arrangement was that the gear ratio between an engine and the output shaft depended on how many engines were driving the transmission. Gear ratio selection was accomplished not by "changing gear" in the conventional sense, but by filling or draining the hydraulic couplings to connect or disconnect the engines from the transmission. With only one hydraulic coupling filled with oil and the other three engines disconnected and their respective input shafts to the transmission locked by the one-way clutches, the single engine drove the output shaft through an effective gear ratio of 4:1. With two engines driving, the effective gear ratio was 2:1; with three engines, 1.33:1; and with all four engines, unity. Essentially, the effective gear ratio of the transmission was the inverse of the number of engines driving it.

Unlike the transmission of a car, there was no overall torque-multiplication effect from selecting a lower gear. The 4:1 mechanical advantage afforded to the single engine driving in first gear was cancelled out by the fact that there was only one engine operating, so the maximum output torque from the transmission was the same as was available in top gear with all four engines operating. The same argument applies to second and third gears. The transmission of this locomotive, therefore, unlike almost all other locomotive transmissions, did not provide any means of matching the torque characteristics of the engine(s) to the requirements of the locomotive; it did not provide for an increased torque output at low speeds for starting and hill climbing. It served only to match the output speed of the engine(s) to the requirements of the locomotive.

The requirement for high starting torque was met in the Fell not by the transmission characteristics but by altering the torque characteristics of the engines themselves. Normally a diesel engine aspires charge at a mass flow rate proportional to its rotational speed; the faster it rotates, the more charge it can aspire, and this leads to a power output curve which rises more or less linearly with rotational speed until various limiting factors become significant.

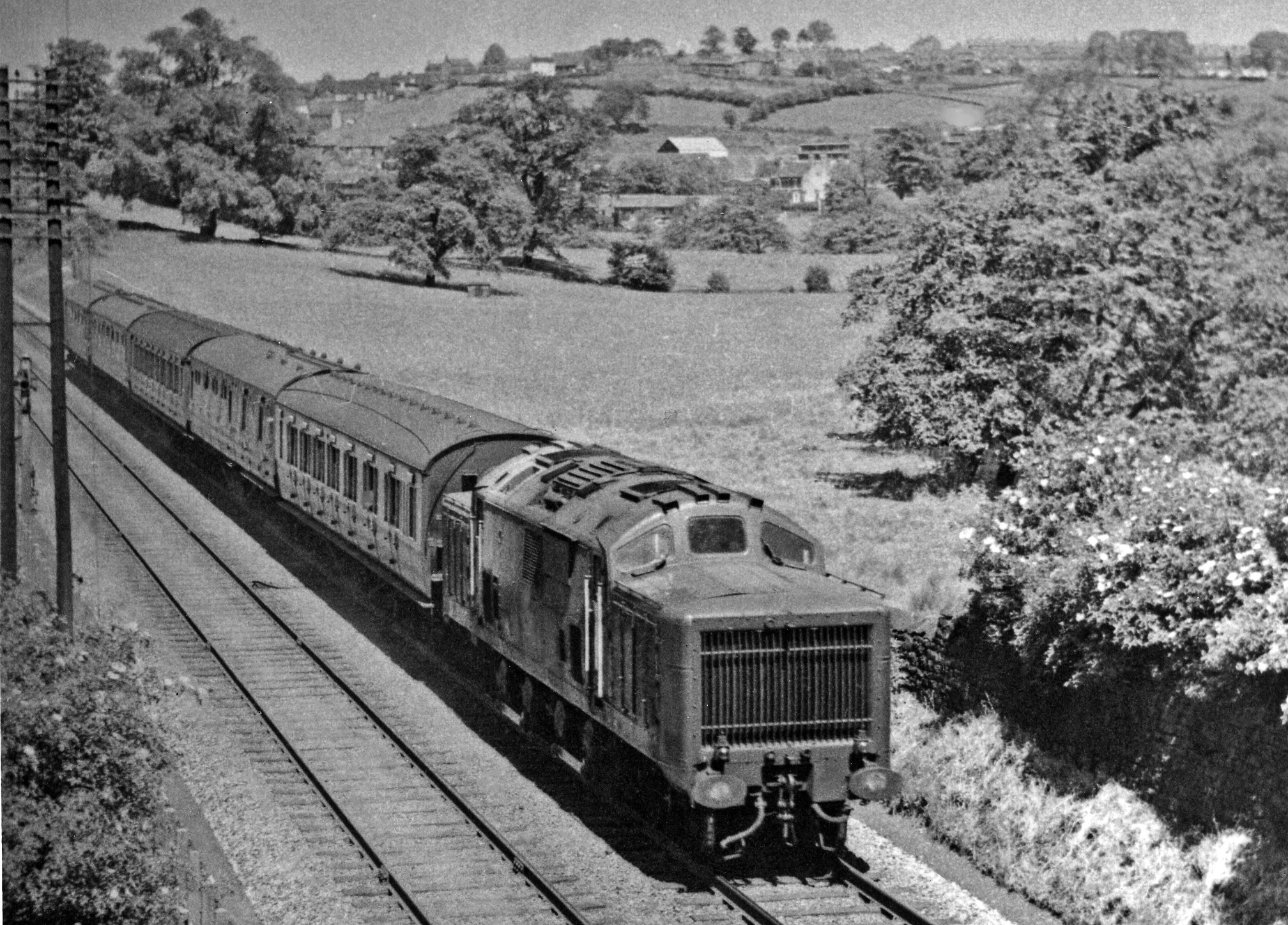
The Fell Diesel south of Belper on a Manchester-London express

In the Fell locomotive, however, the four main drive engines received their charge from Roots blowers driven by two further auxiliary engines which were governed such that when the traction power demand was more than minimal, they operated at essentially a constant speed. Since a Roots blower is a positive-displacement device, this meant that the mass flow rate at which charge was delivered to the main engines depended not on the speed of the main engines but on that of the auxiliary engines, so the power output of the main engines was essentially defined by the speed of the auxiliary engines.

Since the speed of the auxiliary engines was held constant, the main engines had a power curve which was constant with rotational speed; since power is the product of torque and rotational speed, the main engines were endowed with a torque curve inversely proportional to speed, producing maximum torque at a low speed and reducing as the speed increased. Thus the necessary increased low-speed torque output for starting and hill climbing was provided.

== Withdrawal ==
In July 1952, 10100's gearbox was severely damaged after a loose bolt fell through the geartrain, and the locomotive was out of service for over a year. British Railways subsequently lost interest in the project, and an improved version of the locomotive under development was abandoned.

10100 remained in service until 16 October 1958, when its steam heating boiler caught fire at Manchester Central. It was returned to Derby Works, where it was slowly stripped of parts before being scrapped in July 1960.

A working model of the transmission is on display at the National Railway Museum, York.

== See also ==
- Paxman Hi-Dyne engine
