= Shepherdswell with Coldred =

Civil parish in Kent, England

Coordinates: 51.180°N 1.2366°E

Sherpherdswell with Coldred
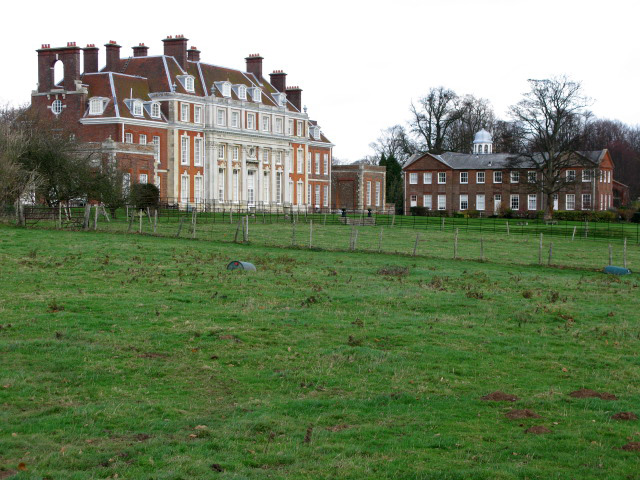
- Waldershare House in the east of the parish

- Location within Kent
- District: Dover
- Shire county: Kent
- Region: South East
- Country: England
- Sovereign state: United Kingdom
- Post town: DOVER
- Postcode district: CT15
- Police: Kent
- Fire: Kent
- Ambulance: South East Coast

Shepherdswell with Coldred is a civil parish in the Dover District of Kent, England. The parish contains the villages of Shepherdswell and Coldred, 1 mile (1.6 km) apart, and the hamlet of Coxhill just south-west of Shepherdswell.

Shepherdswell with Coldred is approximately 30 miles (48 km) east from the county town of Maidstone. The south of the parish is approximately 5 miles (8 km) north-west from the channel port of Dover, and the north, 8 miles (13 km) south-east from Canterbury. A section of the major A2 London to Dover road runs 2 miles (3 km) through the parish at the south-west. Apart from this road, all others within the parish are minor and unnumbered. The National Rail mainline from London to Dover runs through the parish, partly by tunnel.

Parishes surrounding Shepherdswell with Coldred are Womenswold at the north-west; Eythorne at the north; Tilmanstone at the north-east; Whitfield at the south-east; Lydden at the south; and Denton with Wootton at the south-west.

There are two parish churches: St Andrew's in Shepherdswell, and St Pancras' in Coldred.

Historically Shepherdswell with Coldred contained the manors of Popeshall, Coldred and Shebbertswell.

The Grade I listed country house mansion of Waldershare Park, dating to 1705–12, is within Shepherdswell with Coldred at its eastern boundary.
