= British Rail Class 404 =

Class of British electric multiple units

Southern Railway 4-COR, 4-BUF, 4-RES, 4-GRI British Rail Class 404
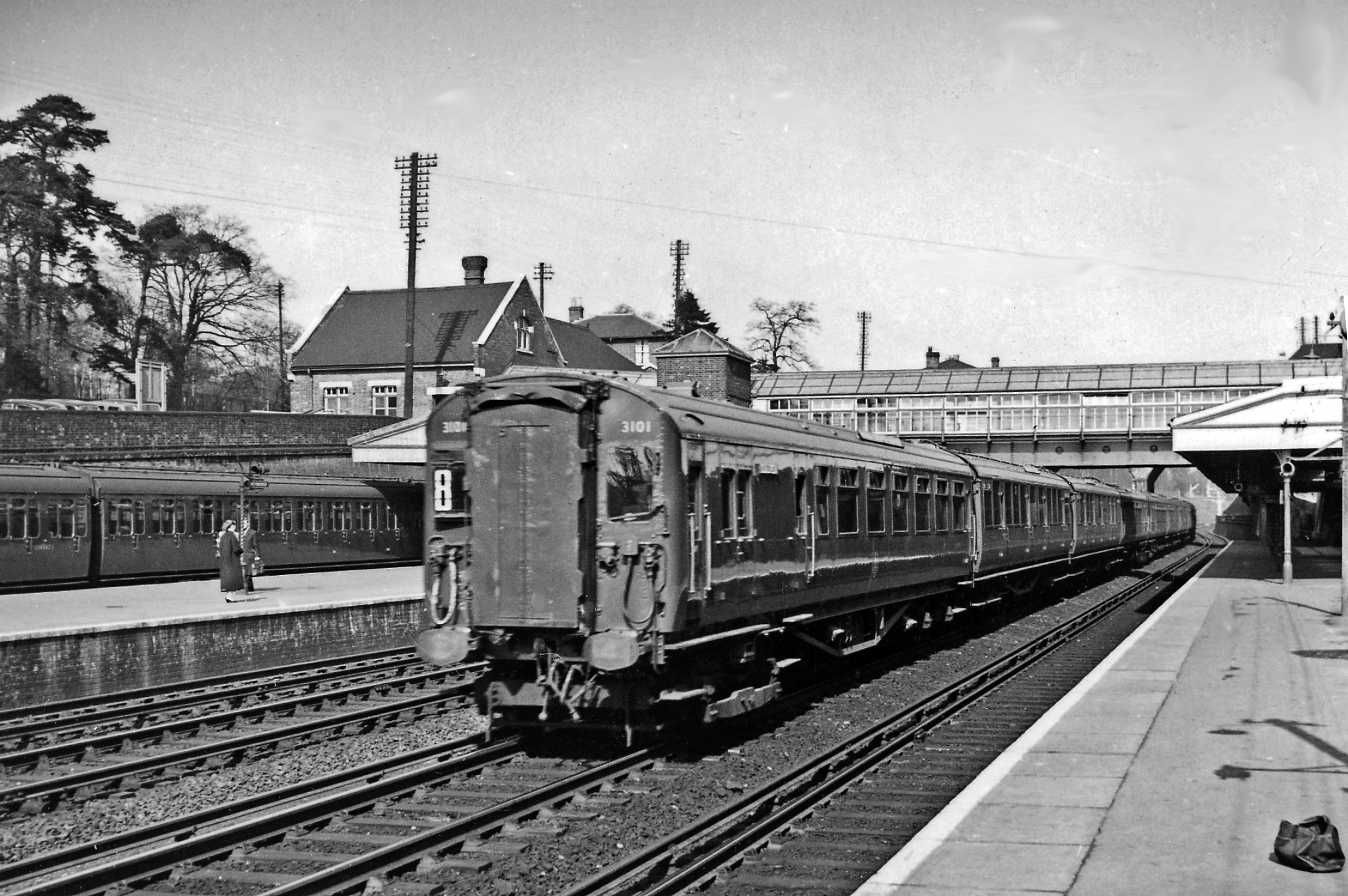
- 4-COR set 3101 passing Weybridge in 1958
- In service: 1937–1972
- Manufacturers: SR Lancing Works (underframes), Eastleigh Works (bodywork)
- Constructed: 1937-38
- Formation: Power car + 2 trailer cars + power car
- Operators: Southern Railway, British Railways

Specifications
- Train length: 265 ft 2 in (80.82 m)
- Width: 9 ft 8 1/2 in (2.96 m)
- Maximum speed: 75 mph (121 km/h)
- Weight: 158 long tons 5 cwt (354,500 lb or 160.8 t)
- Traction motors: Four Metropolitan Vickers
- Power output: 4 x 225 hp (168 kW) total 900 hp (671 kW)
- Electric system: 600 - 750 V DC third rail
- Current collection: Contact shoe
- UIC classification: Bo′2′+2′2′+2′2′+2′Bo′
- Braking system: Automatic Air
- Coupling system: Screw-link
- Multiple working: Standard SR system
- Track gauge: 4 ft 8 1/2 in (1,435 mm) standard gauge

The Southern Railway (SR) gave the designations 4-COR, 4-RES, 4-BUF and 4-GRI to the different types of electric multiple unit built to work the route between London Waterloo and Portsmouth Harbour. The 4-COR type units survived long enough in British Rail ownership to be allocated TOPS Class 404. The COR designation had previously been used for the 6-PUL units and was reused by them during World War II when the Pullman car was stored, but this stock was different from the 4-COR units.

== Phase 1 units ==
The SR electrified the London Waterloo to Portsmouth Harbour via Woking line in the mid-1930s, and full electric services commenced over the route from April 1937. For this service, 29 4-COR units (4-car Corridor units, numbered 3101–3129) and 19 4-RES units (4-car Restaurant units, numbered 3054–3072) were built.

Corridor connections were provided throughout each unit, including between units. This gave them a distinctive front-end appearance as the headcode display was placed on the opposite side of the gangway connection to the driving cab window, leading to their nickname of Nelsons (referring to Lord Nelson's eyepatch, and also to their connection with Portsmouth).

It was intended that, for principal services, 12-car formations would operate with a 4-RES unit (providing the kitchen and dining facilities for the train) sandwiched by two 4-COR units. While all the other carriages for these units were built by the SR at its Eastleigh Works, the Trailer First carriages (which were laid out as dining cars) were built by the Birmingham Railway Carriage and Wagon Company (BRCW) and the Trailer Restaurant Kitchen Third carriages by Metropolitan Cammell.

== Phase 2 units ==
The SR then electrified the line from Three Bridges to Portsmouth via Horsham and the coastal route from West Worthing to Havant, with services over this route commencing in July 1938. For services from London Victoria to Portsmouth via Dorking over these lines, another 26 4-COR units (numbered 3130–3155) were built, together with 13 4-BUF units (4-car Buffet units, numbered 3073–3085).

These new units followed the same design as the Phase 1 stock, except that the restaurant and kitchen facilities of the 4-RES units were replaced by the simpler provision of a buffet. All of these units were built by the SR at its Eastleigh works.

== Formations ==
Initial formations of these units were as follows:

Units	Type	DMBTO	Trailer	Trailer	DMBTO
3054-3072	4-RES	11139–11175 (odds)	TFK 12232–12250 (not in order)	TRKT 12601–12619 (not in order)	11140–11176 (evens)
3073–3085	4-BUF	11229–11253 (odds)	TCK 11846–11858	TRBT 12518–12530	11230–11254 (evens)
3101–3129	4-COR	11081–11137 (odds)	TTK 10055–10083	TCK 11791–11819	11082–11138 (evens)
3130–3155	4-COR	11177–11227 (odds)	TTK 10084–10109	TCK 11820–11845	11178–11228 (evens)

== Reformations and conversions ==
Due to the late delivery of the kitchen and dining carriages for the 4-RES units, these cars were not formed in the sets in numerical order, and some of the driving motor cars initially ran with other trailer cars as 4-COR formations.

The first changes took place during World War II, following the destruction of 25 carriages during bombing raids. This total included the equivalent of three 4-RES units. A number of units were reformed to re-use the carriages that survived from individual units, and after the war was over new carriages were built to replace those destroyed, taking the numbers of the old ones. In total this involved eleven driving motor cars, seven Trailer Thirds, five Trailer Composites, and one buffet car and dining car apiece. This re-arrangement led to the loss of 4-RES units 3058, 3060 and 3063 and the formation of three new 4-COR units, which took numbers 3156–3158.

In 1955 4-RES unit 3072 was converted to a 4-BUF unit following a fire in the kitchen car, which was rebuilt as a prototype Restaurant Buffet design for British Rail. In 1961–1962 the kitchen cars in 4-RES units 3056, 3065 and 3068 were converted into Griddle cars. The units involved were given the classification 4-GRI, and in 1964 they were renumbered 3086–3088.

In January 1964 the remaining 4-RES units were disbanded and the carriages reformed with former 6-PUL and 6-PAN stock. Between then and the final withdrawal of these carriages at the end of the 1960s a variety of different unit formations were created, including further 4-COR units (numbers 3159–3166), 6-COR (3041–3050), 4-PUL (3054–3059), 4-COR(N) (3065–3071) and 6-TC (601). For further details of this complex period of unit reformations, see here.

== Accidents and incidents ==
- On 3 June 1960, an empty stock train formed by two units of the class overran signals at Waterloo and was in a sidelong collision with a steam-hauled passenger train that was departing for Weymouth, Dorset. A few passengers suffered slight injuries.

== Withdrawal and further use ==
Apart from the 4-RES units, which were disbanded in 1964, the 4-COR, 4-BUF and 4-GRI types continued in existence through to the withdrawal of this stock from passenger service in 1972, covering various other services, such as the South Coast Services and the Waterloo—Reading Line, although the last planned working by 4-COR units on Waterloo to Portsmouth diagrams was on 31 July 1971. Thereafter the underframes of a number of carriages were reused by the engineering department as long welded rail carriers and crane runners. A full list of vehicles affected is below:

Old number	New number	Old number	New number	Old number	New number
10081	DB975519	11847	DB975520	11846	DB975521
11849	DB975522	11856	DB975523	11817	DB975524
11854	DB975525	10064	DB975526	11800	DB975527
12245	DB975528	10079	DB975529	11815	DB975530
11802	DB975531	10103	DB975532	12235	DS70281

== Preservation ==
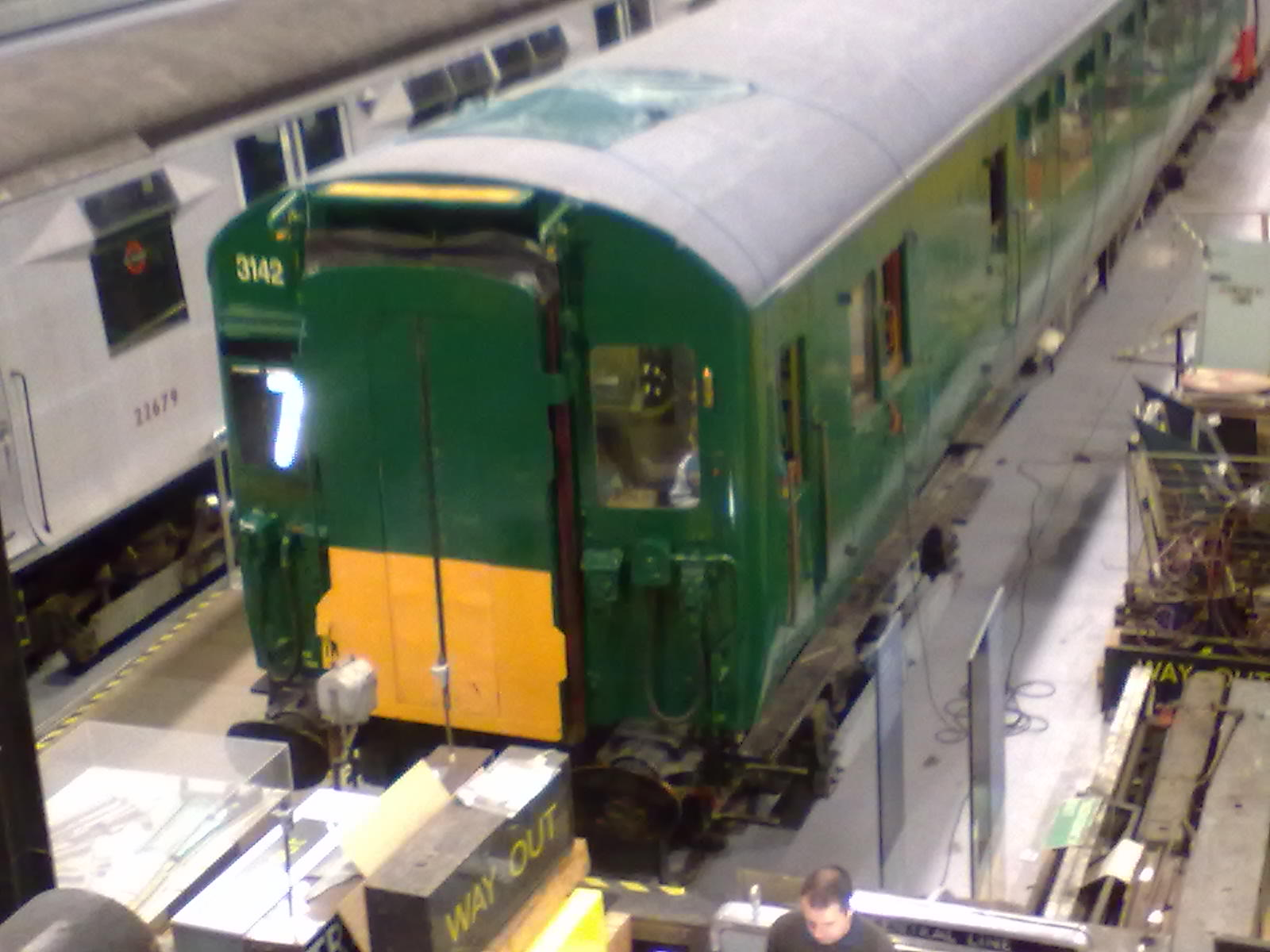
Unit 3135 No. 11187 (as Unit 3142) on display at the London Transport Museum depot

One complete unit was saved for preservation, as were a number of individual vehicles. The complete 4-COR(N) 3142 was purchased by the Southern Electric Group for preservation by British Rail in 1972 and moved to the since defunct Steam Centre at Ashford (Kent).

In 1976 it was moved north to the Nene Valley Railway and helped form the opening train in 1977. The unit came south again to Brighton in September 1986 for restoration work. The unit was moved again to St Leonards Engineering Depot in 1991 as better facilities aided restoration. By 2003 the unit had to be moved to the Bluebell Railway, with S11187S going to the London Transport Museum at Acton.

Later on three of the unit's coaches were moved to the East Kent Railway, with one coach remaining at Horsted Keynes station as an exhibit coach. In late 2012 S11187S was moved to join the three more coaches at the East Kent Railway. The unit has been operational as a two coach hauled unit since July 2013; the Southern Electric Group continues further restoration work on the unit to date.

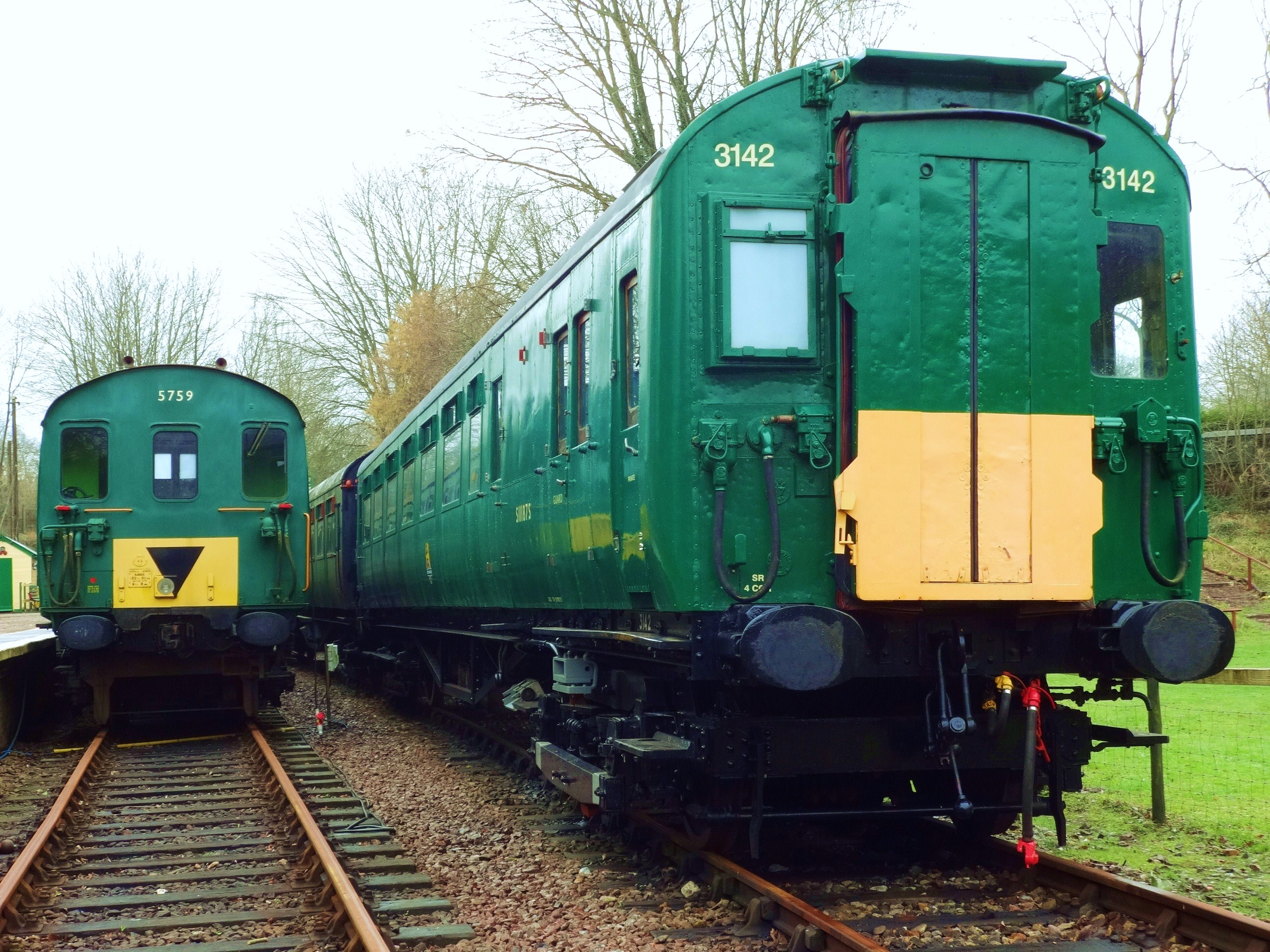
Unit 3142 is now based at the East Kent Railway, making a full four coach unit. Seen here at Shepherdswell station alongside preserved Class 416 2EPB 5759.

In June, 2017, DMBTO 11201, TCK 11825 and TSK 10096 were moved to a site in Kent and sheeted.

Details are set out of surviving vehicles below:

Unit No.	Type	DMBTO	TTK	Trailer	DMBTO	Livery	Owner	Notes
3062	4-RES	-	-	12235	-	-	Eden Valley Railway	Underframe Only
3131	4-COR	11179	-	-	-	SR Green	National Railway Museum	-
3135	4-COR	11187	-	-	-	BR Green	Southern Electric Group	-
3142	4-COR	11161	10096	TCK 11825	11201	BR Green	Southern Electric Group	11161 ex-4Res unit 3065.
