= List of places in Kent =

Places in the English county

The ten most populated towns in Kent

District	#	Administration Centre	Places
Ashford	8	Ashford	Aldington • Appledore • Bethersden • Biddenden • Bilsington • Bilting • Bonnington • Boughton Aluph • Boughton Lees • Brabourne • Brabourne Lees • Bromley Green • Brook • Challock • Charing • Cheeseman's Green • Chilham • Chilmington Green • Crundale • Eastwell • Ebony • Egerton • Finberry • Godinton • Godmersham • Great Chart • Hamstreet • Hastingleigh • High Halden • Hinxhill • Hothfield • Kenardington • Kennington • Kingsnorth • Leigh Green • Little Chart • Mersham • Molash • Newenden • Newtown • Olantigh • Orlestone • Park Farm • Pluckley • Pluckley Thorne • Reading Street • Rolvenden • Rolvenden Layne • Ruckinge • St Michaels • Sevington • Shadoxhurst • Shirkoak • Singleton • Small Hythe • Smarden • Smeeth • Stanhope • Stonebridge Green • Stone in Oxney • Stubbs Cross • Snave • Tenterden • Warehorne • West Brabourne • Westwell • Westwell Leacon • Willesborough • Wittersham • Woodchurch • Wye
Canterbury	10	Canterbury	Adisham • Barham • Bekesbourne • Beltinge • Bishopsbourne • Blean • Bramling • Bridge • Broad Oak • Broomfield • Chartham • Chestfield • Chislet • Eddington • Fordwich • Greenhill • Hackington • Hales Place • Harbledown • Hawthorn • Herne • Herne Bay • Hersden • Hillborough • Hoath • Ickham • Kingston • Littlebourne • Lower Hardres • Marshside • Nackington • Patrixbourne • Petham • Pett Bottom • Reculver • Rough Common • Stourmouth • Stuppington • Sturry • Swalecliffe • Tankerton • Thanington • Tyler Hill • Upper Harbledown • Upper Hardres • Waltham • Westbere • Whitstable • Wickhambreaux • Wincheap • Womenswold • Woolage Green • Woolage Village • Yorkletts
Dartford	1	Dartford	Bean • Betsham • Darenth • Greenhithe • Hawley • Hook Green • Longfield • Long Reach • New Barn • Northfleet Green • Joyce Green • Southfleet • Stone • Sutton-at-Hone • Swanscombe • Temple Hill • Wilmington
Dover	11	Dover	Alkham • Ash • Ashley • Aylesham • Barfrestone • Barnsole • Betteshanger • Buckland • Capel-le-Ferne • Chillenden • Church Whitfield • Coldred • Coombe • Deal • Denton • Drellingore • East Langdon • Eastry • East Studdal • Elmstone • Elvington • Ewell Minnis • Eythorne • Farthingloe • Finglesham • Frogham • Goodnestone • Great Mongeham • Little Mongeham • Guston • Hacklinge • Ham • Hoaden • Hougham • Kearsney • Kingsdown • Knowlton • Langdon • Lydden • Marley • Marshborough • Martin • Martin Mill • Maxton • Nonington • Northbourne • Pineham • Plucks Gutter • Preston • Richborough • Ringwould • Ripple • River • Sandwich • Shatterling • Shepherdswell • Sholden • Snowdown • St Margaret's at Cliffe • Staple • Stourmouth • Sutton • Swingate • Temple Ewell • Tilmanstone • Waldershare • Walmer • Ware • West Langdon • West Studdal • Westcliffe • Westmarsh • Whitfield • Wingham • Woodnesborough • Wootton • Worth
Gravesham	2	Gravesend	Chalk • Cobham • Culverstone Green • Dode • Harvel • Higham • Istead Rise • Luddesdown • Meopham • Meopham Green • Northfleet • Painters Ash • Singlewell • Shorne • Sole Street • Springhead • Thong • Vigo
Maidstone	6	Maidstone	Allington • Ashbank • Barming • Bearsted • Bedmonton • Benover • Beult • Bexon • Bicknor • Boughton Green • Boughton Malherbe • Boughton Monchelsea • Boxley • Bredhurst • Broomfield • Caring • Chainhurst • Chart Sutton • Chegworth • Collier Street • Coxheath • Detling • Downswood • East Barming • East Farleigh • East Sutton • Fairbourne • Frinsted • Grove Green • Harrietsham • Hawkenbury • Headcorn • Hollingbourne • Horden • Hucking • Hunton • Kingswood • Kit's Coty • Ladingford • Langley • Leeds • Lenham • Lidsing • Linton • Loose • Lordswood • Marden • Marley • Milebush • Nettlestead • Nettlestead Green • Otham • Otterden • Park Wood • Platts Heath • Penenden Heath • Pollhill • Ringlestone (hamlet) • Ringlestone (suburb) • Sandling • Sandway • Shepway • Sutton Valence • Staplehurst • Stockbury • Teston • Thurnham • Tovil • Ulcombe • Walderslade • Weavering • West Farleigh • Wormshill • Yalding • Yelsted
Medway (unitary)	White area on map	Chatham	Allhallows • Borstal • Brompton • Chattenden • Cliffe • Cliffe Woods • Cooling • Cuxton • Frindsbury • Frindsbury Extra • Gillingham • Halling • Hempstead • High Halstow • Hoo St Werburgh • Isle of Grain • Lordswood • Park Wood • Rochester • Rainham • Rainham Mark • St Mary Hoo • St Mary's Island • Stoke • Strood • Twydall • Upnor • Wainscott • Walderslade • Wigmore
Sevenoaks	3	Sevenoaks	Ash • Badgers Mount • Bessels Green • Bough Beech • Brasted • Brasted Chart • Chartwell • Chevening • Chiddingstone • Chiddingstone Causeway • Chipstead • Cowden • Crockenhill • Crockham Hill • Dunton Green • Edenbridge • Eynsford • Farningham • Fawkham • Fawkham Green • Fordcombe • Four Elms • Godden Green • Halstead • Hartley • Hever • Hextable • Hodsoll Street • Horton Kirby • Ide Hill • Kemsing • Knockholt • Leigh • Markbeech • Marsh Green • New Ash Green • Otford • Penshurst • Ridley • Riverhead • Seal (including Stone Street) • Seal Chart • Sevenoaks Weald • Shoreham • South Darenth • Sundridge • Swanley • Swanley Village • Toys Hill • Underriver • Well Hill • Westerham • West Kingsdown
Folkestone and Hythe	9	Folkestone	Acrise • Acrise Place • Arpinge • Beachborough • Bladbean • Breach • Brenzett • Brookland • Burmarsh • Cheriton • Danton Pinch • Dymchurch • Dungeness • Elham • Etchinghill • Frogholt • Greatstone • Hawkinge • Hythe • Ivychurch • Lade • Littlestone-on-Sea • Lydd • Lydd-on-Sea • Lyminge • Lympne • Newbarn • Newchurch • Newingreen • Newington • New Romney • Old Hawkinge • Old Romney • Ottinge • Paddlesworth • Pedlinge • Peene • Postling • Rhodes Minnis • Saltwood • Sandgate • Sandling • Sellindge • Snargate • Stanford • Stelling Minnis • St Mary in the Marsh • St Mary's Bay • Westenhanger • West Hythe • Wingmore
Swale	7	Sittingbourne	Badlesmere • Bapchild • Bobbing • Borden • Boughton Street • Boughton under Blean • Bredgar • Brogdale • Buckland • Chestnut Street • Conyer • Dargate • Davington • Denstroude • Doddington • Dunkirk • Eastchurch • Eastling • Elmley • Faversham • Faversham Without • Goodnestone • Graveney • Halfway Houses • Hartlip • Harty • Heart's Delight • Hernhill • Highsted • Iwade • Kemsley • Keycol • Leaveland • Leysdown-on-Sea • Lower Halstow • Luddenham • Lynsted • Milstead • Milton Regis • Minster • Mockbeggar • Murston • Newington • Newnham • North Street • Norton • Norton Ash • Oad Street • Oare • Ospringe • Oversland • Painters Forstal • Queenborough • Rodmersham Green • Rushenden • Selling • Sheldwich • Shellness • Sheerness • Stalisfield • Stone Chapel • Teynham • Throwley • Tonge • Tunstall • Upchurch • Uplees • Warden • Waterham • Whitehill
Thanet	12	Margate	Acol • Birchington-on-Sea • Broadstairs • Brooks End • Cliffsend • Cliftonville • Ebbsfleet • Flete • Garlinge • Manston • Minster • Monkton • Newington • Palm Bay • Ramsgate • Reading Street • Sarre • Sevenscore • St Nicholas-at-Wade • St Peter's • Westbrook • Westwood • Westgate-on-Sea
Tonbridge and Malling	4	Kings Hill	Addington • Aylesford • Beltring • Birling • Blue Bell Hill • Borough Green • Burham • Ditton • East Malling • East Peckham • Eccles • Golden Green • Hadlow • Hildenborough • Ightham • Ivy Hatch • Larkfield • Leybourne • Mereworth • New Hythe • Offham • Platt • Plaxtol • Ryarsh • Shipbourne • Snodland • St Mary's Platt • Stansted • Tonbridge • Trottiscliffe • Walderslade • Wateringbury • West Malling • West Peckham • Wouldham • Wrotham • Wrotham Heath
Tunbridge Wells	5	Royal Tunbridge Wells	Ashurst • Benenden • Bidborough • Brenchley • Capel (including Somerhill) • Colliers Green • Coursehorn • Cranbrook • Culverden Down • Curtisden Green • Five Oak Green • Frittenden • Goudhurst • Groombridge • Hartley • Hawkenbury • Hawkhurst • High Brooms • Horsmonden • Kilndown • Lamberhurst • Langton Green • Matfield • Paddock Wood • Park • Pembury • Rusthall • Sandhurst • Southborough • Speldhurst • Stone Cross • Sissinghurst • Swattenden

== See also ==
- List of settlements in Kent by population
- List of civil parishes in Kent
- Category:Civil parishes in Kent
- Category:Towns in Kent
- Category:Villages in Kent
- Category:Geography of Kent
- List of places in England
