= Horden (disambiguation) =

Horden is a village in County Durham, England.

Horden may also refer to:

== Places ==
- Horden Colliery, a former coal mine in Horden, County Durham, England
- Horden, Kent, England
- Hörden am Harz, Germany

== Other uses ==
- Horden (surname), including a list of people with the name
- Horden Community Welfare F.C., previously Horden Athletic and Horden Welfare
- Horden Rugby Club, original name of Peterlee & Horden RFC
