= Pineham =

Pineham may refer to two places in England:

- Pineham, Milton Keynes, a district in Broughton parish
- Pineham, Kent, a settlement in Whitfield parish
