= Listed buildings in Guston, Kent =

Historic structures in Kent, England

Guston is a village and civil parish in the Dover District of Kent, England. It contains 20 listed buildings that are recorded in the National Heritage List for England. Of these one is grade II* and 19 are grade II.

This list is based on the information retrieved online from Historic England.

== Key ==
Grade	Criteria
I	Buildings that are of exceptional interest
II*	Particularly important buildings of more than special interest
II	Buildings that are of special interest

== Listing ==
Name	Grade	Location	Type	Completed (Note: The date given is the date used by Historic England as significant for the initial building or that of an important part in the structure's description.)	Date designated	Grid ref. (Note: The grid reference is based on the British national grid reference system, sometimes known as OSGB36, used by the Ordnance Survey.) Geo-coordinates	Notes	Entry number (Note: The "List Entry Number" is a unique number assigned to each listed building and scheduled monument by Historic England.)	Image	Wikidata
Buried Reserve and Pillbox, Former Swingate Chain Home Radar Station	II				13 July 2012	TR3359443317; 51°08′29″N 1°20′17″E		1405534	Upload Photo	Q26675741
Block No 36 Dining Hall and Tower	II	Duke Of Yorks Royal Military School			17 June 1983	TR3270843601; 51°08′40″N 1°19′32″E		1111756	Upload Photo	Q26405555
Block Number 14 Gymnasium and Swimming Pool	II	Duke Of Yorks Royal Military School			17 June 1983	TR3273443657; 51°08′41″N 1°19′34″E		1070088	Upload Photo	Q26323644
Block Number 32 Roberts	II	Duke Of Yorks Royal Military School			17 June 1983	TR3281643541; 51°08′38″N 1°19′38″E		1363335	Upload Photo	Q26645167
Block Number 33 Wolseley	II	Duke Of Yorks Royal Military School			17 June 1983	TR3277343574; 51°08′39″N 1°19′35″E		1070085	Upload Photo	Q26323637
Block Number 39 Wellington	II	Duke Of Yorks Royal Military School			17 June 1983	TR3264043644; 51°08′41″N 1°19′29″E		1070086	Upload Photo	Q26323640
Block Number 40 Clive	II	Duke Of Yorks Royal Military School			17 June 1983	TR3258843661; 51°08′42″N 1°19′26″E		1363336	Upload Photo	Q26645168
Block Number 41 Wolfe	II	Duke Of Yorks Royal Military School			17 June 1983	TR3253543665; 51°08′42″N 1°19′23″E		1070087	Upload Photo	Q26323642
Block Number 42 Marlborough	II	Duke Of Yorks Royal Military School			17 June 1983	TR3287043445; 51°08′34″N 1°19′40″E		1363337	Upload Photo	Q26645169
Block Number 46 School Block	II	Duke Of Yorks Royal Military School			17 June 1986	TR3265743513; 51°08′37″N 1°19′29″E		1070084	Upload Photo	Q26323635
Block Number 47 (the Chapel)	II	Duke Of Yorks Royal Military School			17 June 1983	TR3263043470; 51°08′36″N 1°19′28″E		1363334	Upload Photo	Q26645166
East Entrance Lodges Gates and Flanking Walls	II	Duke Of Yorks Royal Military School			17 June 1983	TR3291243325; 51°08′30″N 1°19′42″E		1363333	Upload Photo	Q26645165
The Headmasters House	II	Duke Of Yorks Royal Military School			23 April 1987	TR3288043294; 51°08′29″N 1°19′40″E		1111899	Upload Photo	Q26405716
The Infirmary	II	Duke Of Yorks Royal Military School			21 May 1986	TR3294943525; 51°08′37″N 1°19′44″E		1070089	Upload Photo	Q26323646
West Entrance Lodge Gates and Walls	II	Duke Of Yorks Royal Military School			17 June 1983	TR3224243579; 51°08′40″N 1°19′08″E		1070083	Upload Photo	Q26323633
Swingate Mill	II	Hangmans Lane			22 August 1966	TR3330244358; 51°09′03″N 1°20′05″E		1336972	Upload Photo	Q7658650
Pear Tree Cottage	II	The Lane			11 September 1979	TR3260644742; 51°09′17″N 1°19′30″E		1363338	Upload Photo	Q26645170
Chest Tomb and 2 Headstones About 15 Metres East of Church of St Martin of Tours	II	The Street			23 April 1987	TR3225644732; 51°09′17″N 1°19′12″E		1363357	Upload Photo	Q26645188
Church of St Martin of Tours	II*	The Street	church building		22 August 1966	TR3222944733; 51°09′17″N 1°19′10″E		1070050	Church of St Martin of Tours More images	Q17557643

== See also ==
- Grade I listed buildings in Kent
- Grade II* listed buildings in Kent

== Sources ==
- Newman, John (2013) [1969], Kent: North-East and East, The Buildings of England, New Haven and London: Yale University Press, ISBN 978-0-300-18506-5
