= List of settlements in Kent by population =

The 20 largest settlements of the county of Kent, along with Kings Hill, with district centres in yellow, and key towns and areas shown in white.

This is a list of settlements in Kent by population based on the results of the 2011 census. Another United Kingdom census took place in 2021. In 2011, there were 44 built-up area subdivisions with 5,000 or more inhabitants in Kent, shown in the table below.

See the List of places in Kent article for an extensive list of local places and districts.

== Population ranking ==
#	Settlement	UA/Borough/District	Population	
#	Settlement	UA/Borough/District	2001	2011
1	Maidstone	Maidstone	93,670	113,137
2	Gillingham	Medway	99,370	104,157
3	Dartford	Dartford	85,911	87,415
4	Chatham	Medway	73,900	76,792
5	Ashford	Ashford	55,890	74,204
6	Rochester	Medway	58,490	62,982
7	Margate	Thanet	57,790	61,223
8	Royal Tunbridge Wells	Tunbridge Wells	49,860	57,772
9	Gravesend	Gravesham	51,560	55,467
10	Canterbury	Canterbury	46,490	50,402
11	Folkestone	Folkestone and Hythe	45,060	51,337
12	Sittingbourne	Swale	42,800	48,948
13	Dover	Dover	38,070	43,070
14	Ramsgate	Thanet	38,100	40,515
15	Tonbridge	Tonbridge and Malling	35,830	38,657
16	Herne Bay	Canterbury	35,050	38,385
17	Whitstable	Canterbury	30,200	32,100
18	Deal	Dover	29,248	30,555
19	Sevenoaks	Sevenoaks	26,700	29,506
20	Northfleet	Gravesham	25,150	27,628
21	Ditton (/Aylesford/East Malling)	Tonbridge and Malling	23,580	25,982
22	Broadstairs	Thanet	23,034	23,632
23	Swanscombe	Dartford	15,180	19,835
24	Faversham	Swale	18,220	19,829
25	Minster	Thanet	16,850	18,760
26	Swanley	Sevenoaks	16,588	16,226
27	Hartley (/Longfield/New Ash Green)	Sevenoaks	16,442	16,029
28	Hythe	Folkestone and Hythe	14,766	15,092
29	Sheerness	Swale	11,654	11,938
30	Southborough	Tunbridge Wells	10,233	11,138
31	Snodland	Tonbridge and Malling	9,330	10,211
32	New Romney	Folkestone and Hythe	9,406	9,674
33	Edenbridge	Sevenoaks	7,120	8,172
34	Hawkinge	Folkestone and Hythe	4,440	8,002
35	Paddock Wood	Tunbridge Wells	7,841	7,840
36	King's Hill	Tonbridge and Malling	3,000	7,459
37	Otford	Sevenoaks	6,739	7,155
38	Tenterden	Ashford	6,977	7,118
39	Kingsnorth	Ashford	3,860	6,563
40	Pembury	Tunbridge Wells	6,005	6,128
41	Hoo St Werburgh	Medway	5,260	6,113
42	West Kingsdown	Sevenoaks	5,243	5,484
43	Sturry	Canterbury	5,105	5,085
44	Staplehurst	Maidstone	5,103	5,051
	South Darenth	Sevenoaks	4,230	4,688
	Sandwich	Dover	4,398	4,599
	Borough Green	Tonbridge and Malling	4,247	4,554
	Cuxton	Medway	4,329	4,438
