= Listed buildings in Woodnesborough =

Civil Parish in Kent, England

Woodnesborough is a village and civil parish in the Dover District of Kent, England. It contains 36 listed buildings that are recorded in the National Heritage List for England. Of these three are grade II* and 33 are grade II.

This list is based on the information retrieved online from Historic England.

== Key ==
Grade	Criteria
I	Buildings that are of exceptional interest
II*	Particularly important buildings of more than special interest
II	Buildings that are of special interest

== Listing ==
Name	Grade	Location	Type	Completed (Note: The date given is the date used by Historic England as significant for the initial building or that of an important part in the structure's description.)	Date designated	Grid ref. (Note: The grid reference is based on the British national grid reference system, sometimes known as OSGB36, used by the Ordnance Survey.) Geo-coordinates	Notes	Entry number (Note: The "List Entry Number" is a unique number assigned to each listed building and scheduled monument by Historic England.)	Image	Wikidata
Barn Immediately East of Grove Manor Farmhouse	II				29 November 1988	TR3135256758; 51°15′47″N 1°18′53″E		1252758	Upload Photo	Q26544592
Christian Court	II				21 September 1981	TR2974456978; 51°15′56″N 1°17′31″E		1070107	Upload Photo	Q26323678
Ringleton Manor	II				11 October 1963	TR2960957281; 51°16′06″N 1°17′24″E		1203815	Upload Photo	Q26499323
House About 20 Metres East of Chalk Pit House	II	Barnsole Road			26 November 1987	TR2788356355; 51°15′39″N 1°15′53″E		1070108	Upload Photo	Q26323680
Tomb Chest to Harrison Family, About 2 Metres West of Church of St Mary	II	Church Street			26 November 1987	TR3082756728; 51°15′47″N 1°18′26″E		1281504	Upload Photo	Q26570547
Church of St Mary the Virgin	II*	Church Street	church building		11 October 1963	TR3084156721; 51°15′46″N 1°18′27″E		1281495	Church of St Mary the Virgin More images	Q17557844
Churchgate Farmhouse	II	Church Street			13 October 1952	TR3091756641; 51°15′44″N 1°18′30″E		1363311	Upload Photo	Q26645143
Group of 3 Tomb Chests North of Chancel of Church of St Mary	II	Church Street			26 November 1987	TR3085356728; 51°15′47″N 1°18′27″E		1070109	Upload Photo	Q26323682
Sundial About 15 Metres North of Church of St Mary	II	Church Street			26 November 1987	TR3084256744; 51°15′47″N 1°18′27″E		1363310	Upload Photo	Q26645142
Two Monuments 1 and 3 Metres East of Church of St Mary	II	Church Street			26 November 1987	TR3086056718; 51°15′46″N 1°18′28″E		1203852	Upload Photo	Q26499358
Coombe Lane Cottage	II	Coombe Lane			26 November 1987	TR2960857761; 51°16′22″N 1°17′26″E		1070110	Upload Photo	Q26323684
Fairview Forge Cottage	II	Drainless Road			3 May 1976	TR2993456510; 51°15′41″N 1°17′39″E		1281472	Upload Photo	Q26570523
1 and 2 Oast Cottages and Outbuilding Attached to North West Oast Cottages	II	Grove Road			26 November 1987	TR3124356820; 51°15′49″N 1°18′48″E		1070071	Upload Photo	Q26323611
Denne Court	II	Hammill			26 November 1987	TR2969055818; 51°15′19″N 1°17′25″E		1203862	Upload Photo	Q26499367
Hammill Farmhouse	II	Hammill			13 October 1952	TR2910455415; 51°15′07″N 1°16′54″E		1363329	Upload Photo	Q26645161
Barn About 70 Metres East of Marshborough Farmhouse	II	Marshborough			26 November 1987	TR3066957587; 51°16′15″N 1°18′20″E		1070072	Upload Photo	Q26323612
Ivy House	II	Marshborough, Sandwich, CT13 0PG			26 November 1987	TR3061957279; 51°16′05″N 1°18′17″E		1203877	Upload Photo	Q26499381
Little Garth Mouse Hollow	II	Marshborough			26 November 1987	TR3048057443; 51°16′10″N 1°18′10″E		1363330	Upload Photo	Q26645162
Marshborough Cottage	II	Marshborough			11 October 1963	TR3052157436; 51°16′10″N 1°18′12″E		1203869	Upload Photo	Q26499373
Marshborough Farmhouse	II	Marshborough			11 October 1963	TR3058857571; 51°16′14″N 1°18′16″E		1203866	Upload Photo	Q26499370
Oasts About 30 Metres North East of Marshborough Farmhouse	II	Marshborough			26 November 1987	TR3060157612; 51°16′16″N 1°18′16″E		1070073	Upload Photo	Q26323614
Outhouse About 5 Metres West of Parsonage Farmhouse	II	Marshborough			26 November 1987	TR3074157239; 51°16′03″N 1°18′23″E		1070074	Upload Photo	Q26323616
Parsonage Farmhouse	II	Marshborough			11 October 1963	TR3075957249; 51°16′04″N 1°18′24″E		1203872	Upload Photo	Q26499376
Vine Farmhouse	II	Marshborough			26 November 1987	TR3057257339; 51°16′07″N 1°18′14″E		1363331	Upload Photo	Q26645163
Poulton Manor	II*	Poulton Lane			13 October 1952	TR2805657774; 51°16′24″N 1°16′06″E		1203887	Upload Photo	Q17557751
The Coach House, Street Farm	II*	Street Farm, The Street			11 October 1963	TR3113957131; 51°15′59″N 1°18′43″E		1203901	Upload Photo	Q17557756
Barn About 20 Metres East of Summerfield Farmhouse	II	Summerfield			26 November 1987	TR2805955843; 51°15′22″N 1°16′01″E		1203921	Upload Photo	Q26499421
Summerfield Cottage	II	Summerfield			11 October 1963	TR2800955832; 51°15′22″N 1°15′59″E		1070079	Upload Photo	Q26323624
Summerfield Farmhouse	II	Summerfield			26 November 1987	TR2803555852; 51°15′22″N 1°16′00″E		1070078	Upload Photo	Q26323622
Summerfield House	II	Summerfield			26 November 1987	TR2778156049; 51°15′29″N 1°15′47″E		1281466	Upload Photo	Q26570517
Honeypot Cottage	II	The Street			26 November 1987	TR3122757065; 51°15′57″N 1°18′47″E		1203909	Upload Photo	Q26499408
Russell House and Forecourt Wall	II	The Street			11 October 1963	TR3103457037; 51°15′56″N 1°18′37″E		1363332	Upload Photo	Q26645164
Stables About 20 Metres North of Street Farmhouse	II	The Street			26 April 1982	TR3111957153; 51°16′00″N 1°18′42″E		1070077	Upload Photo	Q26323620
The Homestead the Olde Square	II	The Street			9 November 1977	TR3099557010; 51°15′55″N 1°18′35″E		1203893	Upload Photo	Q26499395
The Old Vicarage	II	The Street			11 October 1963	TR3109057065; 51°15′57″N 1°18′40″E		1070076	Upload Photo	Q26323619
Woodnesborough Village Hall	II	The Street			26 November 1987	TR3095056976; 51°15′54″N 1°18′33″E		1070075	Upload Photo	Q26323617

== See also ==
- Grade I listed buildings in Kent
- Grade II* listed buildings in Kent

== Sources ==
- Newman, John (2013) [1969], Kent: North-East and East, The Buildings of England, New Haven and London: Yale University Press, ISBN 978-0-300-18506-5
