= Listed buildings in Alkham =

Civil Parish in Kent, England

Alkham is a village and civil parish in the Dover District of Kent, England. It contains 25 listed buildings that are recorded in the National Heritage List for England. Of these one is grade I and 24 are grade II.

This list is based on the information retrieved online from Historic England.

== Key ==
Grade	Criteria
I	Buildings that are of exceptional interest
II*	Particularly important buildings of more than special interest
II	Buildings that are of special interest

== Listing ==
Name	Grade	Location	Type	Completed (Note: The date given is the date used by Historic England as significant for the initial building or that of an important part in the structure's description.)	Date designated	Grid ref. (Note: The grid reference is based on the British national grid reference system, sometimes known as OSGB36, used by the Ordnance Survey.) Geo-coordinates	Notes	Entry number (Note: The "List Entry Number" is a unique number assigned to each listed building and scheduled monument by Historic England.)	Image	Wikidata
Granary About 20 Metres South East of Hogbrook	II				28 May 1987	TR2567942118; 51°08′02″N 1°13′28″E		1070040	Upload Photo	Q26323565
Great Everden	II				28 May 1987	TR2342042079; 51°08′04″N 1°11′32″E		1070038	Upload Photo	Q26323561
Hogbrook	II				22 August 1962	TR2565242125; 51°08′02″N 1°13′26″E		1070039	Upload Photo	Q26323563
Headstone William Kinham, About 20 Metres South of Church of St Anthony	II	AAlkham Valley Road			28 May 1987	TR2554442337; 51°08′09″N 1°13′21″E		1363351	Upload Photo	Q26645181
Memorial to Susan Smith Et Al, About 20 Metres South East of Church of St Anthony	II	Alkham Valley Road			28 May 1987	TR2556742341; 51°08′09″N 1°13′22″E		1070043	Upload Photo	Q26323571
Church of St Anthony the Martyr	I	Alkham Valley Road	church building		22 August 1962	TR2554442365; 51°08′10″N 1°13′21″E		1084358	Church of St Anthony the Martyr More images	Q17529740
Coachman's Cottage	II	Alkham Valley Road			28 May 1987	TR2573142330; 51°08′09″N 1°13′31″E		1070044	Upload Photo	Q26323573
Forstal Cottage	II	Alkham Valley Road			28 May 1987	TR2561142318; 51°08′08″N 1°13′25″E		1363352	Upload Photo	Q26645182
Group of 4 Headstones About 15 Metres South West of Church of St Anthony	II	Alkham Valley Road			28 May 1987	TR2552242351; 51°08′10″N 1°13′20″E		1084372	Upload Photo	Q26368022
Group of 4 Headstones About 30 Metres South of Church of St Anthony	II	Alkham Valley Road			28 May 1987	TR2553842327; 51°08′09″N 1°13′21″E		1070042	Upload Photo	Q26323569
Halton Court	II	Alkham Valley Road			28 May 1987	TR2563942368; 51°08′10″N 1°13′26″E		1068543	Upload Photo	Q26321249
Headstone to John White About 5 Metres South of Church of St Anthony	II	Alkham Valley Road			28 May 1987	TR2554442351; 51°08′10″N 1°13′21″E		1084339	Upload Photo	Q26367983
Marquis of Granby	II	Alkham Valley Road			28 May 1987	TR2559142298; 51°08′08″N 1°13′24″E		1363350	Upload Photo	Q26645180
North Hill Cottage	II	Alkham Valley Road			26 October 1978	TR2572142334; 51°08′09″N 1°13′30″E		1366292	Upload Photo	Q26647897
The Old Vicarage	II	Alkham Valley Road			28 May 1987	TR2574542305; 51°08′08″N 1°13′32″E		1366294	Upload Photo	Q26647899
Two Headstones About 10 Metres South of Church of St Anthony	II	Alkham Valley Road			28 May 1987	TR2553842344; 51°08′09″N 1°13′21″E		1070041	Upload Photo	Q26323567
Two Headstones About 15 Metres Due South of Church of St Anthony	II	Alkham Valley Road			28 May 1987	TR2555642342; 51°08′09″N 1°13′22″E		1063712	Upload Photo	Q26317007
The Old Farmhouse	II	Chalksole			28 May 1987	TR2515543543; 51°08′49″N 1°13′04″E		1068560	Upload Photo	Q26321265
Brook House	II	Meggots Lane			28 May 1987	TR2502641620; 51°07′47″N 1°12′53″E		1068564	Upload Photo	Q26321269
Box Tree Cottage	II	Slip Lane			27 August 1952	TR2554742521; 51°08′15″N 1°13′22″E		1363353	Upload Photo	Q26645183
Gate Piers and Walls About 50 Metres East of the Old Rectory	II	Slip Lane			28 May 1987	TR2558142453; 51°08′13″N 1°13′23″E		1070045	Upload Photo	Q26323576
Malmains Manor	II	Slip Lane			22 August 1962	TR2542942579; 51°08′17″N 1°13′16″E		1356204	Upload Photo	Q26638891
The Old Rectory	II	Slip Lane			22 August 1962	TR2550142444; 51°08′13″N 1°13′19″E		1356552	Upload Photo	Q26639197
Hoptons Manor	II	South Alkham			19 March 1987	TR2472441636; 51°07′48″N 1°12′38″E		1363354	Upload Photo	Q26645184
Upton Farmhouse	II	South Alkham			22 August 1962	TR2469041637; 51°07′48″N 1°12′36″E		1070046	Upload Photo	Q26323578

== See also ==
- Grade I listed buildings in Kent
- Grade II* listed buildings in Kent

== Sources ==
- Newman, John (2013) [1969], Kent: North-East and East, The Buildings of England, New Haven and London: Yale University Press, ISBN 978-0-300-18506-5
