= Coombe, Kent =

Settlement in Kent, England

Coordinates: 51.2716°N 1.2937°E

Coombe
- Location within Kent
- OS grid reference: TR298576
- District: Dover
- Shire county: Kent
- Region: South East
- Country: England
- Sovereign state: United Kingdom
- Post town: Dover
- Postcode district: CT13
- Dialling code: 01304
- Police: Kent
- Fire: Kent
- Ambulance: South East Coast
- UK Parliament: Herne Bay and Sandwich

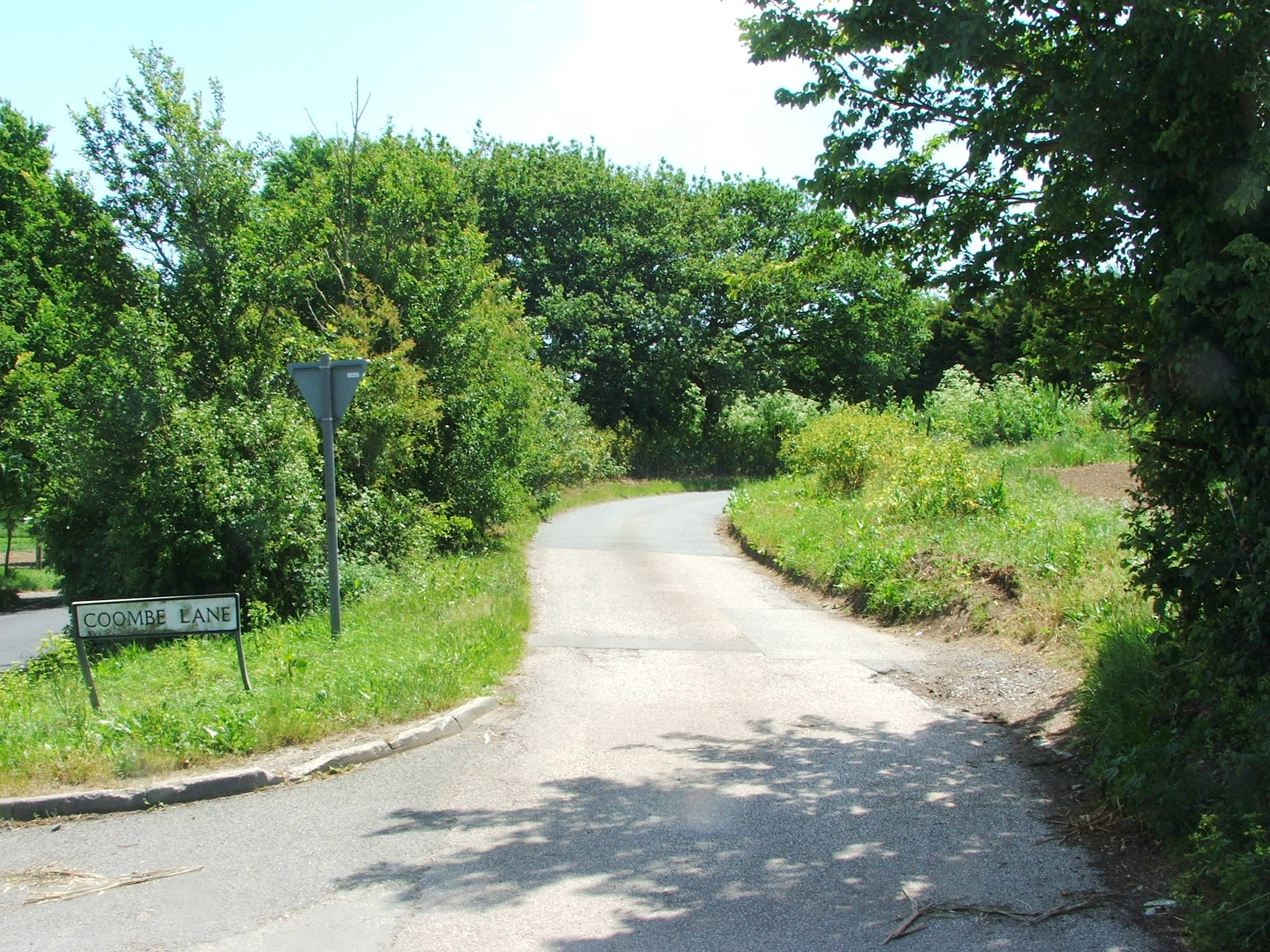
A country road at Coombe

Coombe is a settlement in the English county of Kent. It lies between Ash-next-Sandwich and Woodnesborough.

According to Edward Hasted in 1800, it was a hamlet in the western section of the parish of Woodnesborough.

Coombe Lane passes through the small settlement between Ash towards New Street (heading to Woodnesborough). Coombe Lane Cottage is a Grade II Listed cottage on the lane.

== Etymology ==
The village's name derives from Ancient Celtic cumbā "valley" which was taken into Old English. The name was recorded as æt cumban in 1005, the first word æt representing 'at'.
