= Listed buildings in Bobbing, Kent =

Civil Parish in Kent, England

Bobbing is a village and civil parish in the Swale District of Kent, England. It contains 16 listed buildings that are recorded in the National Heritage List for England. Of these one is grade I and 15 are grade II.

This list is based on the information retrieved online from Historic England.

== Key ==
Grade	Criteria
I	Buildings that are of exceptional interest
II*	Particularly important buildings of more than special interest
II	Buildings that are of special interest

== Listing ==
Name	Grade	Location	Type	Completed (Note: The date given is the date used by Historic England as significant for the initial building or that of an important part in the structure's description.)	Date designated	Grid ref. (Note: The grid reference is based on the British national grid reference system, sometimes known as OSGB36, used by the Ordnance Survey.) Geo-coordinates	Notes	Entry number (Note: The "List Entry Number" is a unique number assigned to each listed building and scheduled monument by Historic England.)	Image	Wikidata
Pheasant Farmhouse	II	Ferry Road			13 December 1974	TQ8983466364; 51°21′53″N 0°43′32″E		1061047	Upload Photo	Q26314183
Pheasants Farmhouse	II	Ferry Road			13 February 1974	TQ8983466369; 51°21′53″N 0°43′32″E		1343861	Upload Photo	Q26627629
14 and 16, Keycol Hill	II	14 and 16, Keycol Hill			7 November 1978	TQ8790664303; 51°20′48″N 0°41′48″E		1069415	Upload Photo	Q26322397
Little Chequers	II	Keycol Hill			27 November 1984	TQ8774064326; 51°20′49″N 0°41′40″E		1343862	Upload Photo	Q26627630
Barn 20 Yards South of Great Norwood	II	Parsonage Lane			27 November 1984	TQ8764266081; 51°21′46″N 0°41′38″E		1069417	Upload Photo	Q26322401
Great Norwood	II	Parsonage Lane			27 August 1952	TQ8760566151; 51°21′48″N 0°41′36″E		1343863	Upload Photo	Q26627631
Parsonage Farm House	II	Parsonage Lane			27 November 1984	TQ8812465729; 51°21′34″N 0°42′02″E		1069416	Upload Photo	Q26322399
Bobbing Court	II	Sheppey Way			24 January 1967	TQ8851864857; 51°21′05″N 0°42′21″E		1069418	Upload Photo	Q26322403
Bobbing Place and Garden Wall	II	Sheppey Way			13 August 1975	TQ8901065489; 51°21′25″N 0°42′48″E		1343865	Upload Photo	Q26627633
Church Farm Cottages	II	Sheppey Way			20 December 1983	TQ8895965262; 51°21′18″N 0°42′45″E		1069421	Upload Photo	Q26322409
Church of St Bartholomew	I	Sheppey Way	church building		24 January 1967	TQ8881465119; 51°21′14″N 0°42′37″E		1299598	Church of St Bartholomew More images	Q17530109
Laurelin House and Luxton House	II	Sheppey Way			27 November 1984	TQ8891465294; 51°21′19″N 0°42′42″E		1069419	Upload Photo	Q26322405
Nether Toes	II	Sheppey Way			24 January 1967	TQ8958465913; 51°21′38″N 0°43′18″E		1343866	Upload Photo	Q26627634
Sole Place	II	Sheppey Way			24 January 1967	TQ8871665083; 51°21′13″N 0°42′32″E		1343864	Upload Photo	Q26627632
The White House	II	Sheppey Way			14 May 1984	TQ8961965877; 51°21′37″N 0°43′20″E		1069420	Upload Photo	Q26322407
Upper Toes	II	Sheppey Way			27 November 1984	TQ8942065773; 51°21′34″N 0°43′09″E		1299595	Upload Photo	Q26586981

== See also ==
- Grade I listed buildings in Kent
- Grade II* listed buildings in Kent

== Sources ==
- Newman, John (2013) [1969], Kent: North-East and East, The Buildings of England, New Haven and London: Yale University Press, ISBN 978-0-300-18506-5
