= Newbarn =

Hamlet in Kent, England

Coordinates: 51.1176°N 1.0827°E

- Location within Kent
- District: Folkestone and Hythe
- Shire county: Kent
- Region: South East
- Country: England
- Sovereign state: United Kingdom
- Post town: Folkestone
- Postcode district: CT18 8
- Police: Kent
- Fire: Kent
- Ambulance: South East Coast
- UK Parliament: Folkestone and Hythe

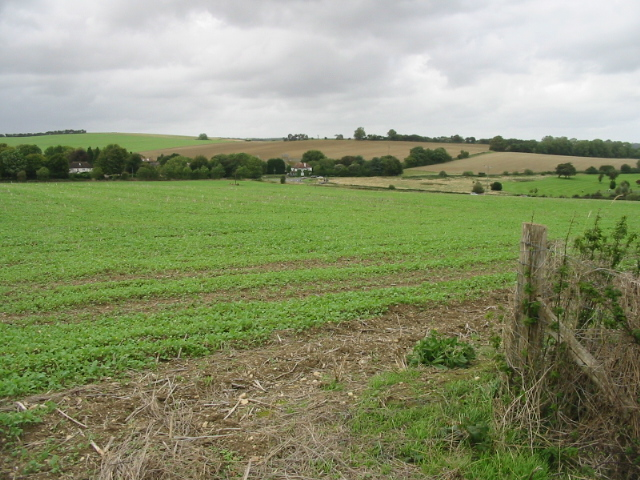
Newbarn

Newbarn is a hamlet around a crossroads northwest of Etchinghill in Kent, England. Etchinghill Golf Club is on the road between the two. Tolsford Hill BT Tower can clearly be seen on Tolsford Hill to the south. It is in the civil parish of Postling.
