= Ashley, Kent =

Hamlet in Kent, England

Coordinates: 51.192°N 1.305°E

Ashley
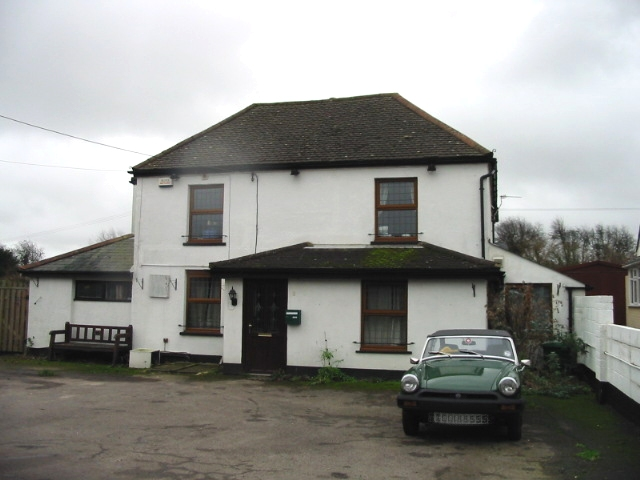
- The Butchers Arms, Ashley

- Location within Kent
- OS grid reference: TR3048
- District: Dover
- Shire county: Kent
- Region: South East
- Country: England
- Sovereign state: United Kingdom
- Post town: Dover
- Postcode district: CT15
- Dialling code: 01304
- Police: Kent
- Fire: Kent
- Ambulance: South East Coast

Ashley (also known, signposted and marked on some maps as Sutton) is a hamlet located in the parish of Sutton, some five miles (8 km) north of Dover on the summit of Gaggs Hill in Kent, England. Ashley runs almost seamlessly into the neighbouring village of Studdal. The A256 road passes to the west of Ashley. The population of the hamlet is included in the civil parish of Tilmanstone.

The main road running through Ashley is Chapel Lane. This is because of the small (Baptist) chapel that still stands on it. It was one of several village chapels in the area which belonged to the Eythorne Baptist Church "group". The chapel has now been converted into a dwelling / house.

The public house in the photograph ceased trading in 2005 and was converted into a private dwelling in 2009.

Ashley is in a predominantly rural area and the starting place of many hiking routes.
