= Cheeseman's Green =

Development in Kent, England

Coordinates: 51.113°N 0.8976°E

- Location within Kent
- Civil parish: Mersham
- District: Ashford
- Shire county: Kent
- Region: South East
- Country: England
- Sovereign state: United Kingdom
- Post town: Ashford
- Postcode district: TN24
- Police: Kent
- Fire: Kent
- Ambulance: South East Coast
- UK Parliament: Ashford

Cheeseman's Green is a housing and commercial development to the south of Ashford in Kent, England. It is adjacent to Sevington and Park Farm. It will have 1100 new homes and 7 hectares of commercial space, plus a variety of community facilities. The population is included in the civil parish of Mersham.

A "SMARTLINK" bus link is proposed between the new development and Ashford's town centre, also linking with the Orbital Business Park, Waterbrook, the Newtown Railway works, Designer Outlet and the International railway station. The scheme aims to provide journey times matching or beating car journey times and a high frequency, competitively priced reliable service.
