= Listed buildings in Egerton, Kent =

Civil Parish in Kent, England

Egerton is a village and civil parish in the Borough of Ashford of Kent, England. It contains one grade I, one grade II* and 83 grade II listed buildings that are recorded in the National Heritage List for England.

This list is based on the information retrieved online from Historic England.

== Key ==
Grade	Criteria
I	Buildings that are of exceptional interest
II*	Particularly important buildings of more than special interest
II	Buildings that are of special interest

== Listing ==
Name	Grade	Location	Type	Completed (Note: The date given is the date used by Historic England as significant for the initial building or that of an important part in the structure's description.)	Date designated	Grid ref. (Note: The grid reference is based on the British national grid reference system, sometimes known as OSGB36, used by the Ordnance Survey.) Geo-coordinates	Notes	Entry number (Note: The "List Entry Number" is a unique number assigned to each listed building and scheduled monument by Historic England.)	Image	Wikidata
Box Farmhouse	II	Bedlam Lane			10 October 1980	TQ8876045918; 51°10′53″N 0°41′58″E		1186195	Upload Photo	Q26481463
Clark Hill Farmhouse	II	Bedlam Lane			10 October 1980	TQ8827045816; 51°10′50″N 0°41′32″E		1071549	Upload Photo	Q26326755
Coldharbour Farmhouse	II	Bedlam Lane			10 October 1980	TQ8845746472; 51°11′11″N 0°41′43″E		1362596	Upload Photo	Q26644473
Kingsden Farmhouse	II	Bedlam Lane			10 October 1980	TQ8815345408; 51°10′37″N 0°41′25″E		1362597	Upload Photo	Q26644474
Watersheet Farmhouse	II	Bedlam Lane			10 October 1980	TQ8800245260; 51°10′32″N 0°41′17″E		1071550	Upload Photo	Q26326757
Weeks Farmhouse	II	Bedlam Lane			10 October 1980	TQ8820845442; 51°10′38″N 0°41′28″E		1299310	Upload Photo	Q26586722
Potter's Forstal Farmhouse	II	Chapel Road, Potter's Forstal			10 October 1980	TQ8896646745; 51°11′19″N 0°42′10″E		1186206	Upload Photo	Q26481473
Stormgard	II	Chapel Road, Potter's Forstal			14 February 1967	TQ8893546815; 51°11′22″N 0°42′08″E		1071551	Upload Photo	Q26326758
Old Harrow Farmhouse	II	Crocken Hill Road			17 September 1952	TQ8934046832; 51°11′22″N 0°42′29″E		1116546	Upload Photo	Q26410145
Ragged House Farmhouse	II	Crocken Hill Road			10 October 1980	TQ9036746045; 51°10′55″N 0°43′21″E		1362598	Upload Photo	Q26644475
The Yews	II	Crocken Hill Road			14 February 1967	TQ9013746185; 51°11′00″N 0°43′09″E		1116540	Upload Photo	Q26410140
Island Farmhouse	II	Cross Road			14 February 1967	TQ8920546877; 51°11′23″N 0°42′22″E		1071552	Upload Photo	Q26326760
Burnt Mill (the Mill House)	II	Egerton Road, Charing Heath			10 October 1980	TQ9121649128; 51°12′34″N 0°44′10″E		1362995	Upload Photo	Q26644850
Field Mill (the Mill Building)	II	Egerton Road			14 February 1967	TQ9153748252; 51°12′05″N 0°44′25″E		1070775	Upload Photo	Q26325164
Field Mill (the Mill House)	II	Egerton Road			14 February 1967	TQ9154948257; 51°12′05″N 0°44′26″E		1185638	Upload Photo	Q26480950
Garage to North East of Field Mill	II	Egerton Road			10 October 1980	TQ9156448264; 51°12′05″N 0°44′26″E		1070776	Upload Photo	Q26325167
Horseshoe Cottage	II	Egerton Road, Charing Heath			10 October 1980	TQ9179948490; 51°12′12″N 0°44′39″E		1185636	Upload Photo	Q26480948
Burscombe Farmhouse	II	Field Farm Road			10 October 1980	TQ9008548586; 51°12′17″N 0°43′11″E		1362599	Upload Photo	Q26644476
Dorne Cottages	II	Field Farm Road			10 October 1980	TQ9034148514; 51°12′15″N 0°43′24″E		1116549	Upload Photo	Q26410148
Weatherboarded Barn to North East of Buscombe Farmhouse	II	Field Farm Road			10 October 1980	TQ9013448612; 51°12′18″N 0°43′13″E		1362616	Upload Photo	Q26644493
Frid Farmhouse	II	Forge Lane, Egerton Forstal			14 February 1967	TQ8928946330; 51°11′05″N 0°42′26″E		1071513	Upload Photo	Q26326708
Poplar Farmhouse	II	Forge Lane, Egerton Forstal			10 October 1980	TQ8938346235; 51°11′02″N 0°42′30″E		1071514	Upload Photo	Q26326709
Greenhill House	II	Green Hill			10 October 1980	TQ9128046676; 51°11′14″N 0°44′09″E		1071515	Upload Photo	Q26326711
Iden	II	Iden Lane			14 February 1967	TQ9162947741; 51°11′48″N 0°44′29″E		1071516	Upload Photo	Q26326712
Weatherboarded Barn to North East of Field Mill, in Grounds of Millstream Cottage	II	In Grounds Of Millstream Cottage, Egerton Road			10 October 1980	TQ9161548331; 51°12′07″N 0°44′29″E		1299597	Upload Photo	Q26586982
Lark Hill Farm	II	Link Hill Lane			10 October 1980	TQ8975147658; 51°11′48″N 0°42′52″E		1362617	Upload Photo	Q26644494
Baker's Farmhouse	II	Link Road			10 October 1980	TQ8939247099; 51°11′30″N 0°42′32″E		1071517	Upload Photo	Q26326714
Link House	II*	Link Road			17 September 1952	TQ8976847207; 51°11′33″N 0°42′52″E		1071518	Link House More images	Q17556239
The Bedewell	II	Link Road			17 September 1952	TQ8986047513; 51°11′43″N 0°42′57″E		1071519	Upload Photo	Q26326715
Hill Dale	II	Lower Street			10 October 1980	TQ9062147317; 51°11′36″N 0°43′36″E		1071520	Upload Photo	Q26326717
Jonstone East and West	II	Lower Street			10 October 1980	TQ9056747306; 51°11′35″N 0°43′33″E		1362619	Upload Photo	Q26644496
Little Manor Cottage Spring Cottage	II	Lower Street			14 February 1967	TQ9057947267; 51°11′34″N 0°43′34″E		1116537	Upload Photo	Q26410138
Mounting Block Opposite Rock Hill House	II	Lower Street			10 October 1980	TQ9046647209; 51°11′32″N 0°43′28″E		1319909	Upload Photo	Q26605967
Range of Barns and Cartsheds 50 Metres to West of Rock Hill House	II	Lower Street			10 October 1980	TQ9040847236; 51°11′33″N 0°43′25″E		1071521	Upload Photo	Q26326718
Rock Hill House	II	Lower Street			14 February 1967	TQ9045747221; 51°11′33″N 0°43′27″E		1362618	Upload Photo	Q26644495
The Old Vicarage	II	Lower Street			14 February 1967	TQ9055247288; 51°11′35″N 0°43′32″E		1116511	Upload Photo	Q26410113
Weatherboarded Barn 50 Metres to North of Rock Hill House	II	Lower Street			10 October 1980	TQ9044247267; 51°11′34″N 0°43′27″E		1071522	Upload Photo	Q26326720
Mundy Bois House	II	Mundy Bois			10 October 1980	TQ9068045588; 51°10′40″N 0°43′36″E		1116516	Upload Photo	Q26410117
Timber Framed Barn to South East of Mundy Bois House	II	Mundy Bois			10 October 1980	TQ9068745567; 51°10′39″N 0°43′36″E		1071523	Upload Photo	Q26326721
Groom Farmhouse	II	Newland Green			14 February 1967	TQ9004246067; 51°10′56″N 0°43′04″E		1116487	Upload Photo	Q26410090
Granary to South of Newlands Farmhouse	II	Newlands Green			10 October 1980	TQ8994045998; 51°10′54″N 0°42′59″E		1116466	Upload Photo	Q26410075
Newlands Farmhouse	II	Newlands Green			10 October 1980	TQ8995346016; 51°10′55″N 0°42′59″E		1362620	Upload Photo	Q26644497
Weatherboarded Barn to South West of Newlands Farmhouse	II	Newlands Green			10 October 1980	TQ8993945964; 51°10′53″N 0°42′58″E		1071524	Upload Photo	Q26326723
Woodlands Farmhouse	II	Newlands Green			10 October 1980	TQ8958245171; 51°10′28″N 0°42′39″E		1319931	Upload Photo	Q26605987
The George Inn	II	Smarden Road			10 October 1980	TQ9073247437; 51°11′40″N 0°43′42″E		1071525	The George Inn More images	Q26326724
Egerton House	II	Star And Garter Road			14 February 1967	TQ9013147952; 51°11′57″N 0°43′12″E		1071528	Egerton House More images	Q26326729
Hazeldene Farmhouse	II	Star And Garter Road, Pembles Cross			10 October 1980	TQ8912247511; 51°11′44″N 0°42′19″E		1116472	Upload Photo	Q26410080
Hollis Farmhouse	II	Star And Garter Road			23 January 1980	TQ8961647845; 51°11′54″N 0°42′45″E		1362621	Upload Photo	Q26644498
Holly Tree Cottage	II	Star And Garter Road, Pembles Cross			10 October 1980	TQ8908447356; 51°11′39″N 0°42′17″E		1362622	Upload Photo	Q26644499
Oasthouse to East of Hollis Farmhouse	II	Star And Garter Road			23 January 1980	TQ8970447816; 51°11′53″N 0°42′50″E		1319934	Upload Photo	Q26605989
Ovenden House	II	Star And Garter Road			10 October 1980	TQ9016148114; 51°12′02″N 0°43′14″E		1116479	Upload Photo	Q26410086
Pembles Cross Farmhouse	II	Star And Garter Road, Pembles Cross			14 February 1967	TQ8909447387; 51°11′40″N 0°42′18″E		1116470	Upload Photo	Q26410078
Star and Garter Cottage	II	Star And Garter Road			10 October 1980	TQ8946847624; 51°11′47″N 0°42′37″E		1319935	Upload Photo	Q26605990
Weatherboarded Barn to South East of Hazeldene Farmhouse	II	Star And Garter Road, Pembles Cross			10 October 1980	TQ8915247490; 51°11′43″N 0°42′21″E		1071527	Upload Photo	Q26326727
Weatherboarded Barn to South of Hollis Farmhouse	II	Star And Garter Road			23 January 1980	TQ8961347821; 51°11′53″N 0°42′45″E		1071526	Upload Photo	Q26326726
Barling's Manor	II	Stone Hill Road			10 October 1980	TQ9075047050; 51°11′27″N 0°43′42″E		1362625	Upload Photo	Q26644502
Malthouse Farmhouse	II	Stone Hill Road			14 February 1967	TQ8995946651; 51°11′15″N 0°43′01″E		1071531	Upload Photo	Q26326733
Oasthouse to North of Stone Hill Farmhouse	II	Stone Hill Road			10 October 1980	TQ9075846965; 51°11′24″N 0°43′42″E		1071530	Upload Photo	Q26326732
Stone Hill Farmhouse	II	Stone Hill Road			14 February 1967	TQ9074046958; 51°11′24″N 0°43′41″E		1319954	Upload Photo	Q26606005
Weatherboarded Barn to East of Stone Hill Farmhouse	II	Stone Hill Road			10 October 1980	TQ9079846948; 51°11′24″N 0°43′44″E		1116433	Upload Photo	Q26410047
Weatherboarded Barn to North of Malthouse Farmhouse	II	Stone Hill Road			10 October 1980	TQ8997346684; 51°11′16″N 0°43′02″E		1319956	Upload Photo	Q26606007
Brook House	II	Stonebridge Green			10 October 1980	TQ9120848037; 51°11′58″N 0°44′08″E		1362624	Upload Photo	Q26644501
Good Intent Cottages	II	1-6, Stonebridge Green			10 October 1980	TQ9115948072; 51°12′00″N 0°44′05″E		1071529	Upload Photo	Q26326730
K6 Telephone Kiosk	II	Stonebridge Green			14 September 1993	TQ9119648072; 51°12′00″N 0°44′07″E		1275166	Upload Photo	Q26564773
Stonebridge Green Cottage	II	Stonebridge Green			10 October 1980	TQ9115448100; 51°12′00″N 0°44′05″E		1116425	Upload Photo	Q26410039
Verralls Oak	II	Stonebridge Green			14 February 1967	TQ9112348030; 51°11′58″N 0°44′03″E		1116460	Upload Photo	Q26410069
Verralls Oak Cottage	II	Stourbridge Green			10 October 1980	TQ9110948016; 51°11′58″N 0°44′03″E		1362623	Upload Photo	Q26644500
1 and 2, the Street	II	1 and 2, The Street			14 February 1967	TQ9079147491; 51°11′41″N 0°43′45″E		1071533	Upload Photo	Q26326736
Church House	II	The Street			10 October 1980	TQ9082847514; 51°11′42″N 0°43′47″E		1319982	Upload Photo	Q26606031
Church of St James	I	The Street			14 February 1967	TQ9081547556; 51°11′43″N 0°43′46″E		1071496	Church of St James More images	Q17582898
Court Lodge	II	The Street			10 October 1980	TQ9097247712; 51°11′48″N 0°43′55″E		1071498	Upload Photo	Q26326683
Forge Cottages	II	1-4, The Street			10 October 1980	TQ9081847510; 51°11′42″N 0°43′47″E		1362626	Upload Photo	Q26644503
Glebe Cottage	II	The Street			10 October 1980	TQ9078247515; 51°11′42″N 0°43′45″E		1071495	Upload Photo	Q26326679
Hopkins General Stores and Post Office	II	The Street			10 October 1980	TQ9077647484; 51°11′41″N 0°43′44″E		1071492	Upload Photo	Q26326674
Mill House	II	The Street			10 October 1980	TQ9084347522; 51°11′42″N 0°43′48″E		1071532	Upload Photo	Q26326735
Oasthouse to North of Court Lodge	II	The Street			10 October 1980	TQ9096747744; 51°11′49″N 0°43′55″E		1071499	Upload Photo	Q26326684
Range of Cartsheds 50 Yards to South East of Court Lodge	II	The Street			10 October 1980	TQ9096747644; 51°11′46″N 0°43′54″E		1071500	Upload Photo	Q26326688
Stone Croft Cottages	II	1-3, The Street			10 October 1980	TQ9075747469; 51°11′41″N 0°43′43″E		1071493	Upload Photo	Q26326676
The Bakery	II	The Street			10 October 1980	TQ9079947502; 51°11′42″N 0°43′46″E		1319972	Upload Photo	Q26606022
The Cottage	II	The Street			10 October 1980	TQ9071547460; 51°11′40″N 0°43′41″E		1071494	Upload Photo	Q26326677
Wall and Gatepiers to Churchyard of Church of St James	II	The Street			10 October 1980	TQ9083547537; 51°11′43″N 0°43′47″E		1071497	Upload Photo	Q26326680
Weatherboarded Barn 30 Yards to South West of Court Lodge	II	The Street			10 October 1980	TQ9094547677; 51°11′47″N 0°43′53″E		1362645	Upload Photo	Q26644520
Weatherboarded Barn to North of Court Lodge	II	The Street			10 October 1980	TQ9098647764; 51°11′50″N 0°43′56″E		1362644	Upload Photo	Q26644519
Timber Framed Barn to North East of Wanden Farmhouse	II	Wanden Road, Wanden			10 October 1980	TQ8892145510; 51°10′39″N 0°42′05″E		1071501	Upload Photo	Q26326689
Wanden Farmhouse	II	Wanden Road, Wanden			14 February 1967	TQ8890645501; 51°10′39″N 0°42′04″E		1116335	Upload Photo	Q26409961

== See also ==
- Grade I listed buildings in Kent
- Grade II* listed buildings in Kent

== Sources ==
- Newman, John (2012) [1969], Kent: West and the Weald, The Buildings of England, New Haven and London: Yale University Press, ISBN 978-0-300-18509-6
