= Listed buildings in Womenswold =

Civil Parish in Kent, England

Womenswold is a village and civil parish in the City of Canterbury district of Kent, England. It contains 16 listed buildings that are recorded in the National Heritage List for England. Of these one is grade I and 15 are grade II.

This list is based on the information retrieved online from Historic England.

== Key ==
Grade	Criteria
I	Buildings that are of exceptional interest
II*	Particularly important buildings of more than special interest
II	Buildings that are of special interest

== Listing ==
Name	Grade	Location	Type	Completed (Note: The date given is the date used by Historic England as significant for the initial building or that of an important part in the structure's description.)	Date designated	Grid ref. (Note: The grid reference is based on the British national grid reference system, sometimes known as OSGB36, used by the Ordnance Survey.) Geo-coordinates	Notes	Entry number (Note: The "List Entry Number" is a unique number assigned to each listed building and scheduled monument by Historic England.)	Image	Wikidata
Denne Hill	II	Denne Hill			29 September 1952	TR2238449499; 51°12′05″N 1°10′55″E		1336632	Upload Photo	Q26621114
Kitchen Garden Walls at Denne Hill	II	Denne Hill			30 January 1967	TR2244449911; 51°12′18″N 1°10′59″E		1085467	Upload Photo	Q26372715
The Former Stables at Denne Hill	II	Denne Hill			30 January 1967	TR2241049783; 51°12′14″N 1°10′57″E		1055729	Upload Photo	Q26309477
1 and 2, the Street	II	1 and 2, The Street			14 March 1980	TR2272050535; 51°12′38″N 1°11′14″E		1085469	Upload Photo	Q26372720
Aylesham Farmhouse	II	The Street, Aylesham Farm			14 March 1980	TR2276650607; 51°12′40″N 1°11′17″E		1055742	Upload Photo	Q26307368
Church of St Margaret	I	The Street	church building		30 January 1967	TR2274150585; 51°12′40″N 1°11′16″E		1085468	Church of St Margaret More images	Q17529519
Nethersole Farmhouse	II	The Street, Nethersole Farm			14 March 1980	TR2282350640; 51°12′41″N 1°11′20″E		1085472	Upload Photo	Q26372738
Thatched Cottage	II	The Street			14 March 1980	TR2276050560; 51°12′39″N 1°11′17″E		1085471	Upload Photo	Q26372734
The Cottage	II	The Street			14 March 1980	TR2278650625; 51°12′41″N 1°11′18″E		1085470	Upload Photo	Q26372727
Well Cottage	II	The Street			14 March 1980	TR2278950587; 51°12′40″N 1°11′18″E		1345573	Upload Photo	Q26629184
Wymlingdon House	II	The Street			14 March 1980	TR2275850545; 51°12′38″N 1°11′16″E		1057688	Upload Photo	Q26309856
K6 Telephone Kiosk	II	Woolage Green			13 July 1990	TR2371049258; 51°11′55″N 1°12′03″E		1241645	Upload Photo	Q26534507
Little Thatch	II	Woolage Green			20 December 1989	TR2380849359; 51°11′59″N 1°12′08″E		1273443	Upload Photo	Q26563188
The Old Farmhouse	II	Woolage Green			30 January 1967	TR2391149125; 51°11′51″N 1°12′13″E		1085473	Upload Photo	Q26372743
Two Sawyers Public House	II	Woolage Green			14 March 1980	TR2371949226; 51°11′54″N 1°12′03″E		1336598	Two Sawyers Public House More images	Q26621081
Woolage Farmhouse	II	Woolage Green, Woolage Farm			14 March 1980	TR2393849452; 51°12′01″N 1°12′15″E		1057691	Upload Photo	Q26309859

== See also ==
- Grade I listed buildings in Kent
- Grade II* listed buildings in Kent

== Sources ==
- Newman, John (2013) [1969], Kent: North-East and East, The Buildings of England, New Haven and London: Yale University Press, ISBN 978-0-300-18506-5
