= Listed buildings in Kingsnorth =

Historic buildings in Kent, England

Kingsnorth is a village and civil parish in the Borough of Ashford of Kent, England. It contains one grade I and 29 grade II listed buildings that are recorded in the National Heritage List for England.

This list is based on the information retrieved online from Historic England.

== Key ==
Grade	Criteria
I	Buildings that are of exceptional interest
II*	Particularly important buildings of more than special interest
II	Buildings that are of special interest

== Listing ==
Name	Grade	Location	Type	Completed (Note: The date given is the date used by Historic England as significant for the initial building or that of an important part in the structure's description.)	Date designated	Grid ref. (Note: The grid reference is based on the British national grid reference system, sometimes known as OSGB36, used by the Ordnance Survey.) Geo-coordinates	Notes	Entry number (Note: The "List Entry Number" is a unique number assigned to each listed building and scheduled monument by Historic England.)	Image	Wikidata
Mill House	II	Ashford Road			10 October 1980	TR0004039043; 51°06′57″N 0°51′24″E		1071462	Upload Photo	Q26326633
Shipley Hatch	II	Ashford Road			10 October 1980	TR0001038988; 51°06′55″N 0°51′23″E		1320382	Upload Photo	Q26606384
Wix's Farmhouse	II	Ashford Road			10 October 1980	TQ9979337980; 51°06′23″N 0°51′09″E		1071461	Upload Photo	Q26326632
Bond Farmhouse	II	Bond Lane			10 October 1980	TR0052938709; 51°06′45″N 0°51′49″E		1115501	Upload Photo	Q26409223
Taylor Farmhouse	II	Bond Lane			14 February 1967	TR0023938496; 51°06′39″N 0°51′33″E		1362666	Upload Photo	Q26644541
Brisley Farmhouse	II	Chart Road			10 October 1980	TQ9934440209; 51°07′35″N 0°50′51″E		1071463	Upload Photo	Q26326635
Glenmore Lodge	II	Chart Road			10 October 1980	TQ9947240213; 51°07′35″N 0°50′57″E		1320389	Upload Photo	Q26606391
Barn to South of Old Mumford Farmhouse	II	Church Hill			10 October 1980	TR0076638858; 51°06′50″N 0°52′01″E		1115433	Upload Photo	Q26409164
Church of St Michael	I	Church Hill			14 February 1967	TR0061339241; 51°07′02″N 0°51′54″E		1362667	Church of St Michael More images	Q17529444
Glebe Cottage	II	Church Hill			10 October 1980	TR0065239287; 51°07′04″N 0°51′56″E		1071464	Upload Photo	Q26326636
Mouse Hall	II	Church Hill			10 October 1980	TR0057339260; 51°07′03″N 0°51′52″E		1115481	Upload Photo	Q26409206
Mulberry House	II	Church Hill, TN23 3EG			14 February 1967	TR0053639165; 51°07′00″N 0°51′50″E		1362668	Upload Photo	Q26644542
Mumford Cottage	II	Church Hill			10 October 1980	TR0060239176; 51°07′00″N 0°51′53″E		1071465	Upload Photo	Q26326637
Mumford House	II	Church Hill			10 October 1980	TR0067239075; 51°06′57″N 0°51′57″E		1320415	Upload Photo	Q26606411
Old Mumford Farmhouse	II	Church Hill			17 September 1952	TR0077438882; 51°06′51″N 0°52′02″E		1362669	Upload Photo	Q26644543
Pound Farmhouse	II	Church Hill			10 October 1980	TR0019339330; 51°07′06″N 0°51′33″E		1320407	Upload Photo	Q26606404
Pound Green	II	Church Hill			10 October 1980	TR0018339400; 51°07′08″N 0°51′32″E		1320408	Upload Photo	Q26606405
Queen's Head Public House	II	Church Hill			10 October 1980	TR0013439398; 51°07′08″N 0°51′30″E		1071466	Upload Photo	Q26326639
Candlemass Cottage	II	Church Lane, TN23 3EQ			10 October 1980	TR0065339266; 51°07′03″N 0°51′56″E		1115476	Upload Photo	Q26409202
Finn Farm Oast	II	Finn Farm Road, TN23 3EX			10 October 1980	TR0156438506; 51°06′37″N 0°52′41″E		1115435	Upload Photo	Q26409166
Finn Farmhouse	II	Finn Farm Road			14 February 1967	TR0153038489; 51°06′37″N 0°52′40″E		1071467	Upload Photo	Q26326640
One Mile Oast	II	Finn Farm Road, TN23 3EX			10 October 1980	TR0158338494; 51°06′37″N 0°52′42″E		1362631	Upload Photo	Q26644507
Weatherboarded Barn to North of Finn Farmhouse	II	Finn Farm Road			10 October 1980	TR0153738521; 51°06′38″N 0°52′40″E		1071468	Upload Photo	Q26326642
Willowbed Farmhouse	II	Long Length			10 October 1980	TQ9920539971; 51°07′28″N 0°50′43″E		1320433	Upload Photo	Q26606424
Houghton House	II	Magpie Hall Road			10 October 1980	TQ9943138567; 51°06′42″N 0°50′52″E		1071469	Upload Photo	Q26326643
Weatherboarded Barn to North West of Smithfield Farmhouse	II	Magpie Hall Road			10 October 1980	TQ9962938497; 51°06′40″N 0°51′02″E		1320438	Upload Photo	Q26606428
Cloverley Cottage	II	Millbank Road			10 October 1980	TQ9967440210; 51°07′35″N 0°51′08″E		1362632	Upload Photo	Q26644508
Ponderville	II	Steeds Lane			10 October 1980	TR0127937995; 51°06′21″N 0°52′26″E		1071470	Upload Photo	Q26326646
Sticketts Farmhouse	II	Steeds Lane			10 October 1980	TR0124538107; 51°06′25″N 0°52′24″E		1320439	Upload Photo	Q26606429
Pickenden	II	Stumble Lane			10 October 1980	TR0089238536; 51°06′39″N 0°52′07″E		1320421	Upload Photo	Q26606417

== See also ==
- Grade I listed buildings in Kent
- Grade II* listed buildings in Kent

== Sources ==
- Newman, John (2012) [1969], Kent: West and the Weald, The Buildings of England, New Haven and London: Yale University Press, ISBN 978-0-300-18509-6
