= Postling =

Village in Kent, England

Coordinates: 51.1108°N 1.0646°E

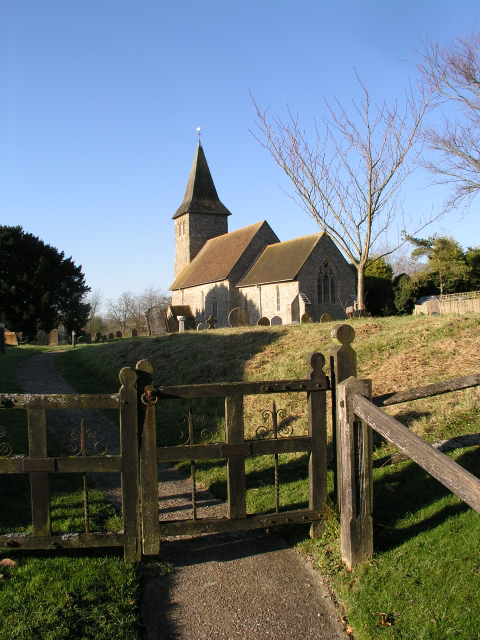
- St Mary & St Radegund, Postling

- Location within Kent
- Population: 179; 206 (2011 Census)
- OS grid reference: TR145390
- Civil parish: Postling
- District: Folkestone and Hythe
- Shire county: Kent
- Region: South East
- Country: England
- Sovereign state: United Kingdom
- Post town: HYTHE
- Postcode district: CT21
- Dialling code: 01303
- Police: Kent
- Fire: Kent
- Ambulance: South East Coast
- UK Parliament: Folkestone and Hythe

Postling is a village and civil parish situated near the Roman road of Stone Street, about 17 miles (27 km) south of Canterbury, Kent, in South East England. Postlinges is the spelling used in the Domesday Book, where it was part of the lands of Hugo de Montfort; Postlinge is also seen in old records. There is much archaeological evidence of continued occupation of the area. Postling Court is, in effect, the old manor-house, although is, more correctly as the name suggests, the one-time meeting place of the local court and magistrate. The population of the civil parish includes the hamlet of Newbarn.

The parish church is dedicated to Saints Mary and Radegund. It is a Grade I listed building. The oldest parts are from the late 11th or 12th century.

A junction south of the village is known as Postling Wents; "went" or "vent" is an older Kent word which means "ways". It was once the crossroads where the London to Folkestone road crossed the Lympne to Lyminge road, but is now a sharp bend on the A20.

== See also ==
- Tolsford Hill BT Tower is visible to the east of the village
