= Bobbing, Kent =

Village in Kent, England

Coordinates: 51.349998°N 0.700000°E

Bobbing
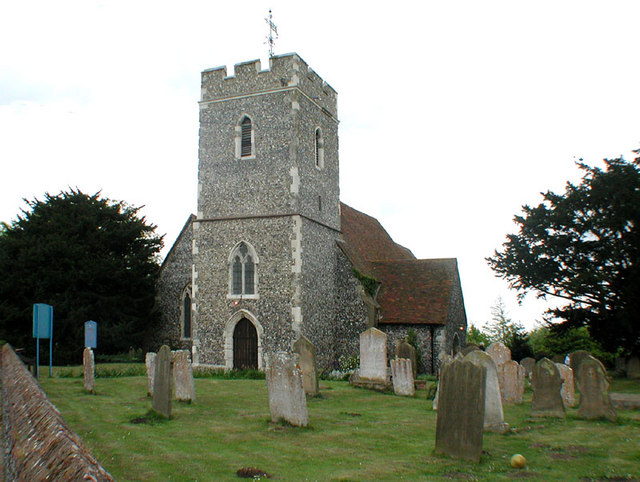
- St Bartholomew, Bobbing, Kent

- Location within Kent
- Population: 1,969 (2011 Census)
- OS grid reference: TQ8865
- District: Swale
- Shire county: Kent
- Region: South East
- Country: England
- Sovereign state: United Kingdom
- Post town: Sittingbourne
- Postcode district: ME9
- Dialling code: 01795
- Police: Kent
- Fire: Kent
- Ambulance: South East Coast
- UK Parliament: Sittingbourne and Sheppey

Bobbing is a village and civil parish in the Swale district of Kent, England, about a mile north-west of Sittingbourne, and forming part of its urban area. The hamlet of Howt Green and village of Keycol are included within the parish. According to the 2011 census Bobbing parish had a population of 1,969.

The parish of Bobbing, according to Edward Hasted in 1800, contained about 780 acres of land, of which 40 nowere wood.

The mediaeval manor house of Bobbing Court, now a Grade II listed ruin, was built by the Savage family; it passed to Henry Clifford, Esq., who ceded it to the distinguished soldier Sir Conyers Clifford, and then by marriage into the St. Leger family.

The village church, St Bartholomew, is a grade I listed building. It is within the diocese of Canterbury and deanery of Sittingbourne. According to Edward Hasted in 1798, the church consisted of two small aisles and two chancels, having a tall spire steeple at the west end of it, in which are five bells.

The strange career of Titus Oates, inventor of the Popish Plot, included a brief period as Vicar of Bobbing. He was presented with the living by the local squire, Sir George Moore (who had recently purchased Bobbing Court) in 1673, but his drunkenness and blasphemy so horrified his parishioners that they ejected him before the end of the year.

In 2003, the Cremation Society of Great Britain opened the "Garden of England Crematorium" on the outskirts of the village.

== Transportation ==
The village is located beside the A249 road. The Chatham Main Line passes the village but there is no railway station.

== See also ==
- Listed buildings in Bobbing, Kent
