= Egerton, Kent =

Village in Kent, England

Coordinates: 51.194°N 0.730°E

Egerton
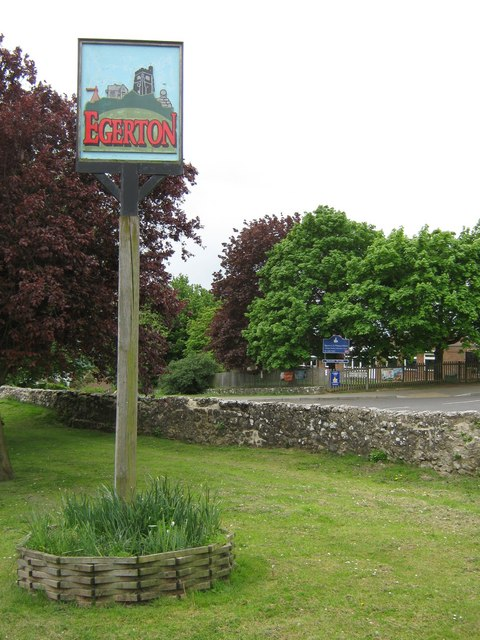
- Egerton village sign

- Location within Kent
- Area: 12.38 km^{2} (4.78 sq mi)
- Population: 1,073 (Civil Parish 2011)
  - Density: 87/km^{2} (230/sq mi)
- OS grid reference: TQ9147
- Civil parish: Egerton
- District: Ashford
- Shire county: Kent
- Region: South East
- Country: England
- Sovereign state: United Kingdom
- Post town: Ashford
- Postcode district: TN27
- Dialling code: 01233
- Police: Kent
- Fire: Kent
- Ambulance: South East Coast
- UK Parliament: Weald of Kent

Egerton is a village and civil parish in the Ashford District of Kent, England. The village is on the Greensand Ridge 9 miles (14.4 km) north of Ashford and stretches three miles south into a lower plain towards the West Stour. The parish is a relatively scattered rural one; the settlement of Stonebridge Green, adjacent to Egerton village centre, is also in the parish.

== Geography ==
A narrow escarpment of dense Greensand forms the north of the parish where the largest single residential area is. The Greensand Way runs in part through the churchyard of St James's Church in the village.

The northern slopes of this are two named woods. Most of the slopes and plain below to the south is used for mixed farming and hedgerows, with a lower proportion of woodland and wider buffer areas between settled farmstead clusters of homes.

The ecclesiastical parish and civil parish overlap.

== Amenities ==
A large pub, The George, is joined by the village's community centre the Millennium Hall, the village store and post office, a games barn, cricket and football pitches, and a primary school, which has a minimum weekly event and funding from the local Church of England community. A farmers' market is held weekly in the Millennium Hall.

Egerton has a medium proportion of listed properties for the English countryside such as Egerton House and a Saxon Burial mound.

The 13th-century parish church in the Church of England exists which is dedicated to the disciple of Jesus of Nazareth, Saint James. It has the highest grading in the national scheme of listed buildings, Grade I.

== In film, the media and literature ==
The village's now defunct bakery was featured on the 1990s television programme The Darling Buds of May.

Hair of the Dog was the sixth studio album by the Scottish hard rock band Nazareth, released in April 1975. The album was recorded at Escape Studios in Egerton, with additional recording and mixing at AIR Studios in London.

== See also ==
- Listed buildings in Egerton, Kent
