= Guston, Kent =

Village in Kent, England

Coordinates: 51.154°N 01.32°E

Guston
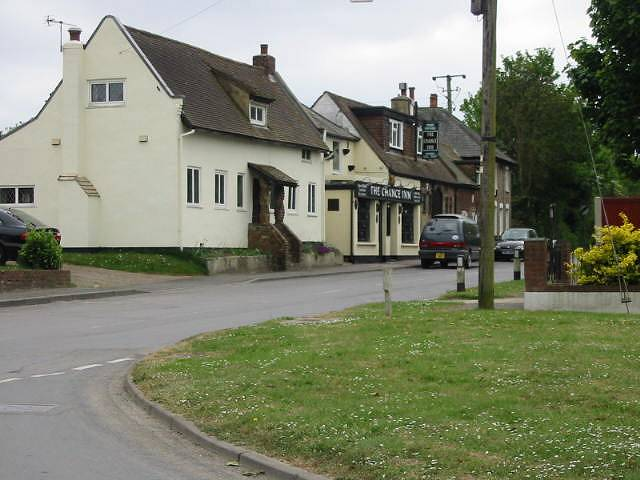
- The Chance Inn, Guston

- Location within Kent
- Population: 1,740 (2011)
- Civil parish: Guston
- District: Dover
- Shire county: Kent
- Region: South East
- Country: England
- Sovereign state: United Kingdom
- Post town: Dover
- Postcode district: CT15
- Police: Kent
- Fire: Kent
- Ambulance: South East Coast

Guston is a village and civil parish in the Dover district of Kent, in South East England. The village lies about a quarter of a mile north of the campus of the Duke of York's Royal Military School, near Martin Mill. In the 1950s the village was the site of a public house, a post office, a Saxon church and approximately one-hundred homes. There is also a windmill present, which has been converted into a house. Nearby villages include Whitfield, East Langdon, Pineham and Buckland. The River Dour is approximately 2.71 km away from Guston, and there is easy access to main roads, with the A2 and A258 running around and through the village.

In the early 1870s, Guston was described by John Wilson:

"A parish in Dover district, Kent; 2½ miles E by N of Ewell r. station, and 2½ N of Dover. Posttown, Dover. Acres, 1, 421; of which 20 are water. Real property, £2, 554. Pop., 436. Houses, 88. The property is divided among a few. The living is a vicarage in the diocese of Canterbury; and was annexed in 1868 to the vicarage of River. The church is Norman; has three windows at the west end; and is good. There is a Wesleyan chapel."

== History ==
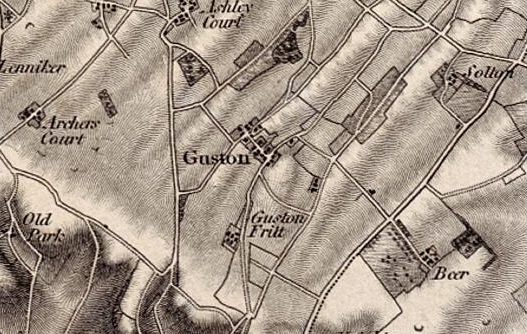
19th century map of Guston

Guston is an Old English word stemming from tun, meaning ‘village' or 'farmstead’. It is first seen on record as Gocistone in the Domesday Book, meaning ‘Guthsige’s village’.

"The Manor of Guston formerly belonged to the abbot and convent of St. Augustine, who held it as a prebend in the church of St. Martin, in Dover. It passed into their possession after the taking of the survey of Domesday, in 1080".

In 1881 alone over 77 males living in Guston were involved in the Military as part of the defence of the country. Even back in 1881, there was a large military presence in the area. This remained all the way until after the Second World War. However, Guston's population changed dramatically during World War II. In 1930 the population was just over 1600 people. By 1950 it had decreased to less than 800, having halved within 2 decades. In total, 2226 shells were listed as having been fired at Dover, but evidence suggests many more. Many of these shells would have affected people in nearby areas including Guston, Whitfield, East Langdon, Pineham and Buckland.

Before the war began, many residents of Dover fled to areas in Wales and in the English countryside as far away from Dover as possible. In 1931 there were 1,191 males living in the area and 406 females living in Guston according to the census reports. By 1951 this number had been cut dramatically to only 397 men and 365 females living in the area. This emphasises the huge number of men that left the area to fight and did not return after the war, as well as the devastating effects the bombing had on the housing at the time. This is one reason why the population may have dropped so significantly; the housing was now not substantial enough to support such a large number of people.

== Churches ==
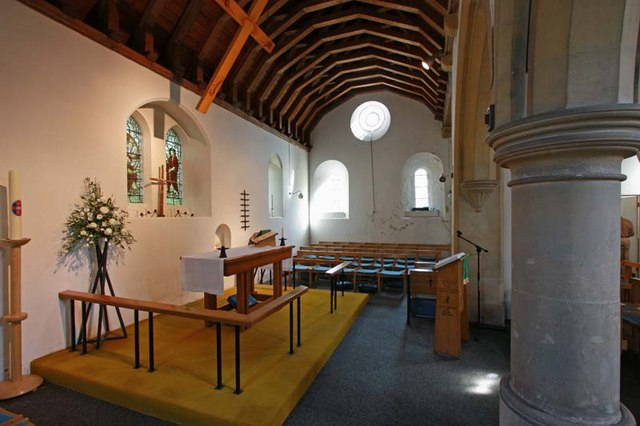
Interior of St Peter's Church, Kent

There are two churches in close proximity to Guston, St Martin of Tours and St Peters Church. St Martin of Tours is the parish church of Guston, and is described on the church website:

"The church was built around 1090, 24 years after the Battle of Hastings. The lack of change over the centuries is no doubt due to the Monastic Orders and the Archbishops of Canterbury. The lay-out inside is unique, the design suggesting it is shaped by an Anglican worship, with the pulpit next to the chancel, a result of the emphasis on the sermon within Sunday worship. It also has the typical Anglican altar rail so that communion can be taken kneeling – a Nonconformist chapel would have had an altar table surrounded by seating, such as can be seen at Langley Chapel, in Shropshire."

John E. Vigar has written of St Martin of Tours:

"Restored in the Victorian Era and there is little of the church left from earlier periods. The arrangement of three Norman windows in the east wall is a common architectural feature, and can be found elsewhere in the county, such as in Bonnington. Inside the church, the Victorian glass shows two images of Saint Martin. A south nave window contains a 20th century depiction of The Good Samaritan. Separating the nave and chancel is a spindly nineteenth century screen with quatrefoil piercings. There are few monuments in the church, however a ledger dedicated to Thomas Harrison survives in the chancel."

== Demographics ==
=== Population ===
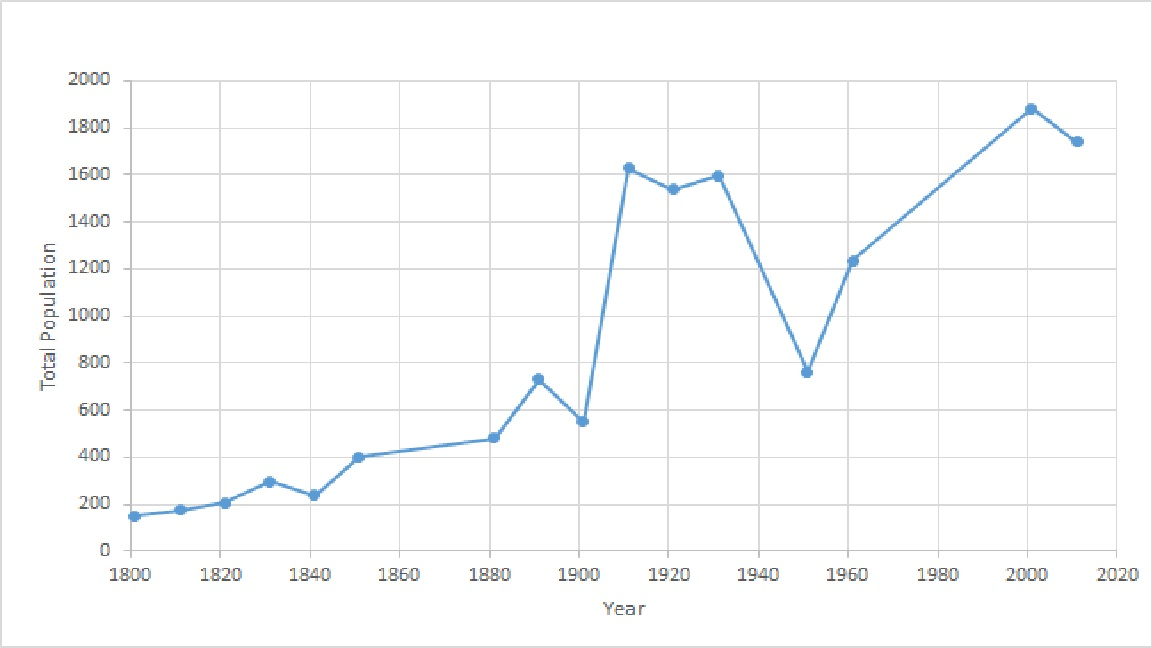
Population Time Series

According to the office of neighbourhood statistics, there is over 917 males (persons) and 823 females (persons) living in the area currently. Out of a population of 1,740 people only 1,087 people are above the age of 16. Furthermore, in total 20.1% of people in the area are retired and over the age of 65. Therefore, it is clear that there is quite a high young population and elderly population within the area. In addition to this 6.29% of people are in poor or very bad health; however, this would be expected due to the relatively high elderly and young population in the area.

=== Housing ===
In total there are 462 households in Guston, of which 439 are two bedroom places or more. In the last 20 years, average house prices have risen from £184,168 to £337,772, an increase of almost a quarter of a million. In terms of social housing, 14.3% of people in Guston live are currently in council rented housing.

=== Education ===
The Guston Church of England Primary School is the only primary school providing for the area. From 2015 to 2016, Guston Primary School had an intake of 140 students which consisted on 47.9% females and 52.1% males, similar to the national average. On 11 October 2016, Ofsted carried out an inspection and gave the school a rating of 2 (good), suggesting they 'have an accurate understanding of the school's strengths and recognize areas where performance can be further improved'.

As for secondary schools in the area, the nearest secondary school is called The Duke of York's Royal Military School which teaches children from age 11 to 18.

Due to the high achieving schools in the area, qualifications are high. Out of 1,740 people only 156 people in the area have no qualifications at all. Although a lot of these people are still in education, 368 people in the area have a high level of qualification at either level 3 or 4.

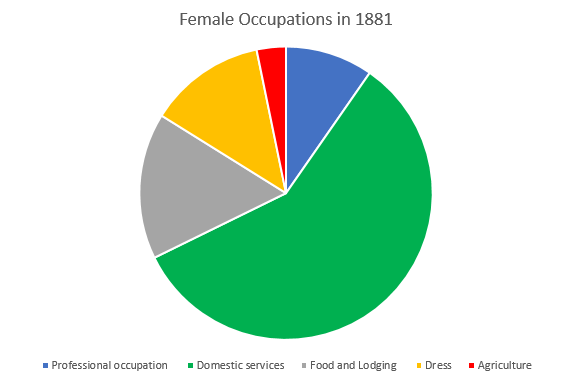
Female Occupations in 1881

Male Occupations in 1881
