= Stubbs Cross =

Hamlet in Kent, England

Coordinates: 51.116°N 0.8355°E

- Location within Kent
- District: Ashford
- Shire county: Kent
- Region: South East
- Country: England
- Sovereign state: United Kingdom
- Post town: Ashford
- Postcode district: TN26
- Dialling code: 01233
- Police: Kent
- Fire: Kent
- Ambulance: South East Coast
- UK Parliament: Weald of Kent

Stubbs Cross is a hamlet in the civil parish of Kingsnorth near Ashford in Kent, England. The area runs from a cross road at Ashford Road that leads to Hamstreet, through to the next T Junction via Magpie Pie Hall Road, leading to but finishing at the road known as Tally Ho Road.

Magpie Hall Road (Stubbs Cross) has approximately 55-60 houses which sit either side of the road. The road is approximately 1.4 km in length with smallholdings and farmed fields on each side.
