= Westmarsh =

Village in Kent, England

Coordinates: 51.305°N 1.265°E

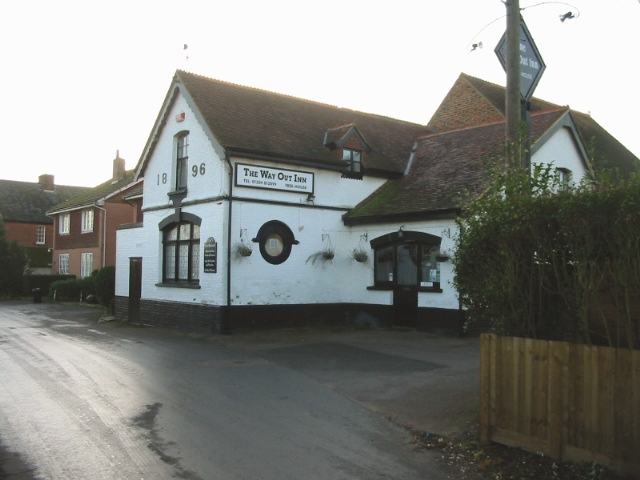
- The Way Out Inn, Westmarsh

- Location within Kent
- OS grid reference: TR2761
- District: Dover
- Shire county: Kent
- Region: South East
- Country: England
- Sovereign state: United Kingdom
- Post town: Canterbury
- Postcode district: CT3
- Police: Kent
- Fire: Kent
- Ambulance: South East Coast

Westmarsh is a village in the Ash civil parish of East Kent, England. It is situated 8 miles (13 km) east of Canterbury and 7 miles (11 km) west of Ramsgate.

Westmarsh is within a designated area of outstanding natural beauty and orchard filled countryside.

The community centres on the village hall where local events are held. Historic buildings include Wingham Barton Manor, a Tudor country house, and Barton Barn, one of the oldest surviving isle barns in the country. The previous Rose Inn public house became the Way Out Inn, then The Rose Garden Tea Rooms which has since closed to the public. The nearest railway station is at Sandwich
