= Ware, Kent =

Village in Kent, England

Coordinates: 51.30°N 1.27°E

Ware
- Location within Kent
- District: Dover
- Shire county: Kent
- Region: South East
- Country: England
- Sovereign state: United Kingdom
- Post town: Canterbury
- Postcode district: CT3 2
- Police: Kent
- Fire: Kent
- Ambulance: South East Coast

Ware is a village situated between Canterbury and Ramsgate in Kent, England. The population of the village is included in the civil parish of Ash
