= Stonebridge Green =

Coordinates: 51.1981°N 0.7369°E

- Location within Kent
- OS grid reference: TQ913478
- Civil parish: Egerton
- District: Ashford
- Shire county: Kent
- Region: South East
- Country: England
- Sovereign state: United Kingdom
- Post town: Ashford
- Postcode district: TN27
- Dialling code: 01233
- Police: Kent
- Fire: Kent
- Ambulance: South East Coast
- UK Parliament: Weald of Kent

Stonebridge Green is a settlement adjacent to, and within the civil parish of, Egerton in the Ashford District of Kent, England. It lies immediately north east of the main village, and includes the bridge over the Great Stour river, after which it is named.
