= Ewell Minnis =

Village in Kent, England

Coordinates: 51.145°N 1.233°E

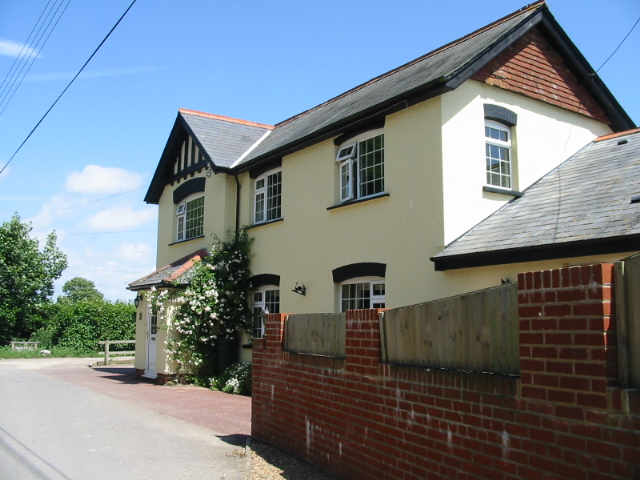
- Former Newcastle Inn (2008)

- Location within Kent
- District: Dover
- Shire county: Kent
- Region: South East
- Country: England
- Sovereign state: United Kingdom
- Post town: Dover
- Postcode district: CT15 7
- Police: Kent
- Fire: Kent
- Ambulance: South East Coast

Ewell Minnis is a village near Dover in Kent, England. The population is included in the civil parish of Alkham. See Stelling Minnis for information on the origin of the word Minnis.
