= Keycol =

Village in Kent, England

Coordinates: 51.348°N 0.6909°E

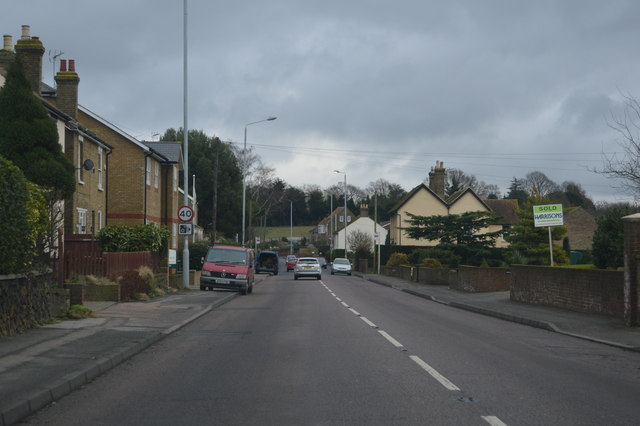
- A2 road through Keycol

- Location within Kent
- District: Swale
- Shire county: Kent
- Region: South East
- Country: England
- Sovereign state: United Kingdom
- Post town: Sittingbourne
- Postcode district: ME9
- Police: Kent
- Fire: Kent
- Ambulance: South East Coast

Keycol is a village near Sittingbourne in Kent, England. At the 2011 Census the population of the village was recorded in the civil parish of Bobbing.

This is on the old Roman road A2 between Key Street (the junction between Sittingbourne and the A249) and Newington.

Keycol Hill was the site of Keycol Hill Hospital. It was erected at a cost of about £5,000. According to Kelly's Directory of Kent of 1903. In 1880 the hospital had a loan of £320 from the Local Government Board. Which was divided into two parts - an Isolation unit and a T.B. Sanatorium. It was administered separately by the Sittingbourne and Milton District Health Department (previously the Sittingbourne and Milton Joint Hospital Board) and the Kent County Health Department. In 1998, the management transferred to 'The Thames Gateway National Health Service Trust'. Soon afterwards it closed. Then in 2005, 36 buildings were built on the site.

Also on Keycol Hill is the Sittingbourne Water Works. Built on Feb 15th, 1868.

Away from the main road is Demelza Hospice for Children.
