= Marshborough =

Hamlet in Kent, England

Coordinates: 51.27°N 1.3°E

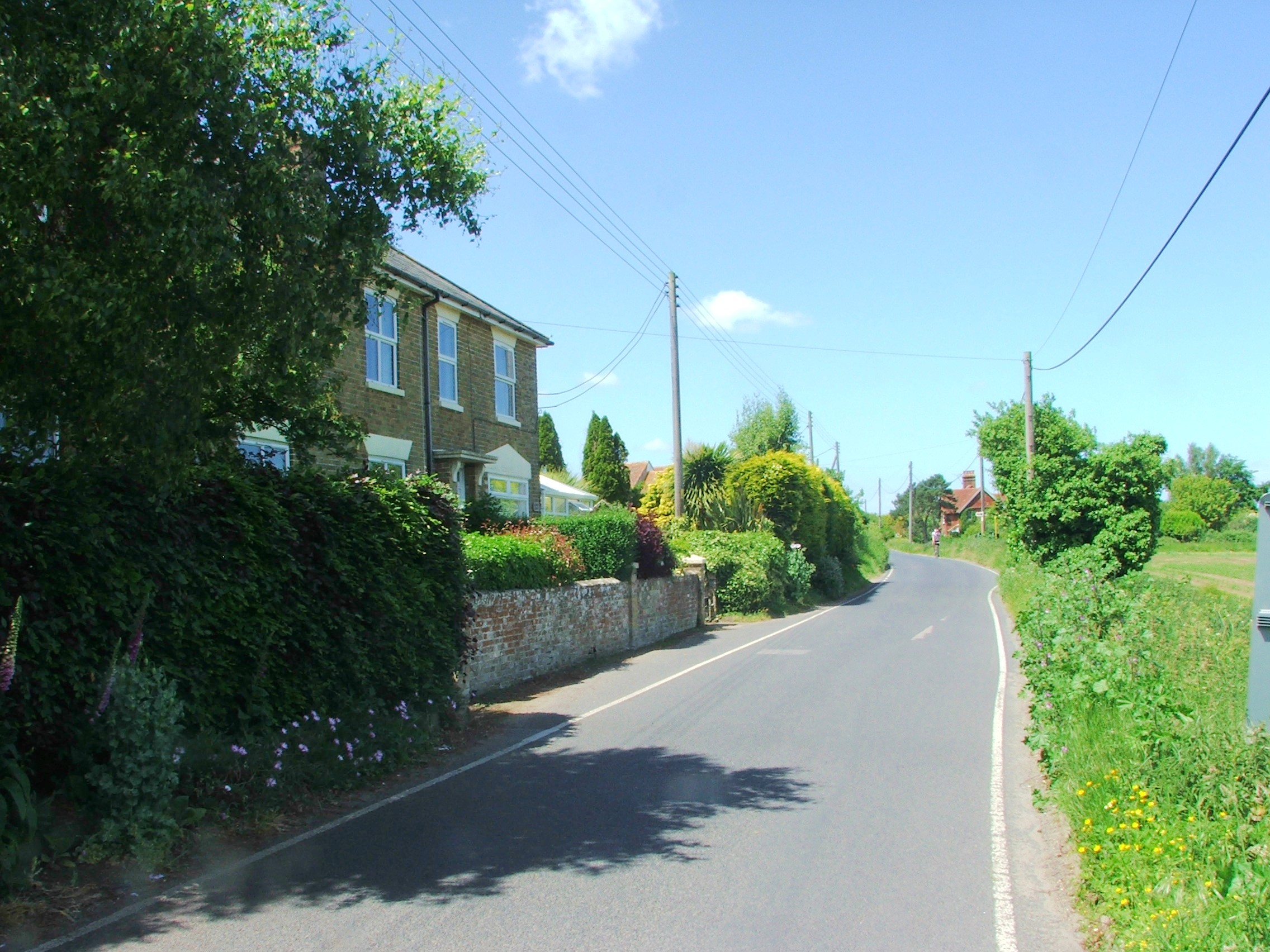
- Marshborough Road

- Location within Kent
- District: Dover
- Shire county: Kent
- Region: South East
- Country: England
- Sovereign state: United Kingdom
- Post town: Sandwich
- Postcode district: CT13
- Police: Kent
- Fire: Kent
- Ambulance: South East Coast

Marshborough is a small hamlet immediately adjacent to Woodnesborough in East Kent, England.

== Listed buildings ==
=== Parsonage Farm ===
The farmhouse was built in the 17th century or earlier, with an 18th-century frontage.

=== Parsonage Farm Outhouse ===
An 18th-century stables or outhouse in red brick.
