= Ash, Dover District =

Village and civil parish in the Dover district of east Kent, England

Coordinates: 51.2774°N 1.2761°E

Ash
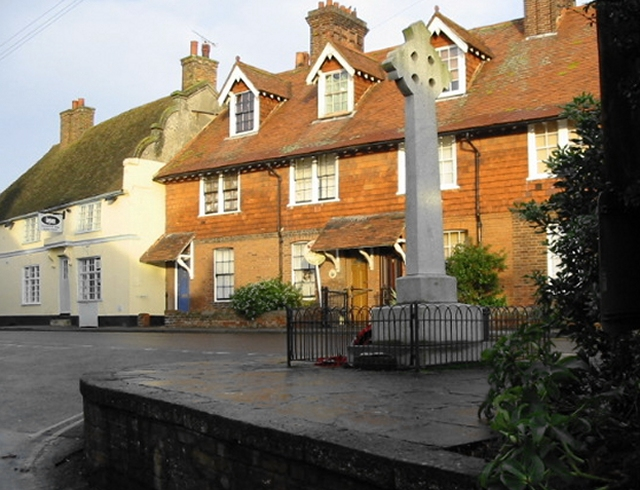
- The War Memorial in Ash

- Location within Kent
- Population: 3,365 (2011)
- OS grid reference: TR285582
- Civil parish: Ash
- District: Dover
- Shire county: Kent
- Region: South East
- Country: England
- Sovereign state: United Kingdom
- Post town: CANTERBURY
- Postcode district: CT3
- Dialling code: 01304
- Police: Kent
- Fire: Kent
- Ambulance: South East Coast
- UK Parliament: Herne Bay and Sandwich

Ash is a village and civil parish in the Dover district of east Kent about three miles west of Sandwich.

The civil parish has a population of 2,767, increasing to 3,365 at the 2011 Census, and includes the villages of Ash, Westmarsh, Ware, Hoaden and Richborough. The Ash Level, by the River Stour, takes up the northern part of the parish.

== History ==
Ash was once on the main thoroughfare from Canterbury to the channel port of Sandwich. It takes its name from the Old English æsc (ash) and shows its toponymy in its first recorded form, Æsce, in about 1100.

A variation may be Esch in 1418.

Ash was once part of the Royal manor of Wingham and having been given to the See of Canterbury in 850 AD by King Athelstan, it became a separate parish in 1282, one of the largest in Kent at that time.

The Harflete or Harfleet family were Lords of the Manor for many years. The family died out in the late seventeenth century.

The Grade I listed parish church, is dedicated to St Nicholas and probably built on the site of an earlier Saxon church, dates partly from the 12th century and has a 15th-century tower with a lead spire (once used as a navigation aid for ships), which now houses a ring of ten bells. It also has the best collection of medieval monumental effigies in Kent, including one to Jane Kerriel (c. 1455) which reveals a unique horseshoe head-dress.

Ash is known for its market gardens, and at one time had its own brewery and organ maker. There are two vineyards nearby.

There are many medieval buildings in the village, including 'Molland House' which is named as a Historic Building of Kent and eleven of the twelve original manor houses. In the same lane are a number of Tudor cottages. The Chequer Inn began life as a timber-framed hall house, dating from about 1500.

From 1916 to 1948 it had a station ("Ash Town") on the East Kent Light Railway, one of Colonel Stephens' lines, which ran between Shepherdswell and Wingham.

== Notable features ==
The village has a primary school (named Cartwright and Kelsey), a prep school (named St Faiths), doctors' surgery and several corner shops.

The village is also on the Miner's Way Trail. The trail links up the coalfield parishes of East Kent.

== Notable people ==
- Ann Robertson (nurse)
- Paul Farbrace (cricket coach)
- Jonathan Ackeroyd (ex-CEO Burberry)
- Matilda Anne Mackarness (née Planché)
- Matilda Oldcastle, the daughter of John Oldcastle

== See also ==
- RAF Ash
