= Horden (surname) =

Horden is an English surname. Notable people with the surname include:

- Hildebrand Horden (died 1696), London actor
- John Horden (1828–1893), the first Anglican Bishop of Moosonee
- Richard Horden (1944–2018), British architect

== See also ==
- Hor-Den early Egyptian king who ruled during the 1st dynasty
