= Womenswold =

Village in Kent, England

Coordinates: 51°12′39″N 1°11′16″E

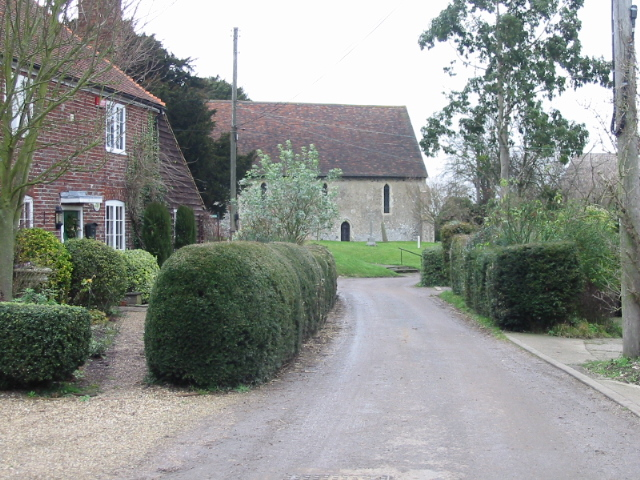
- The Street, Womenswold

- Location within Kent
- Area: 7.44 km^{2} (2.87 sq mi)
- Population: 286 (Civil Parish 2011)
  - Density: 38/km^{2} (98/sq mi)
- OS grid reference: TR227508
- Civil parish: Womenswold
- District: City of Canterbury
- Shire county: Kent
- Region: South East
- Country: England
- Sovereign state: United Kingdom
- Post town: Canterbury
- Postcode district: CT4
- Dialling code: 01227
- Police: Kent
- Fire: Kent
- Ambulance: South East Coast
- UK Parliament: Canterbury

Womenswold is a village and civil parish centred 7 miles (11 km) south-east of Canterbury, Kent, England, 1 mile to the east of the A2 road. The parish consists of three hamlets: Womenswold, Woolage Village and Woolage Green.

Historically, Womenswold has been recorded with various spellings, including Wymynswold, Wimlingswold. and possibly Wymelyngewolde.

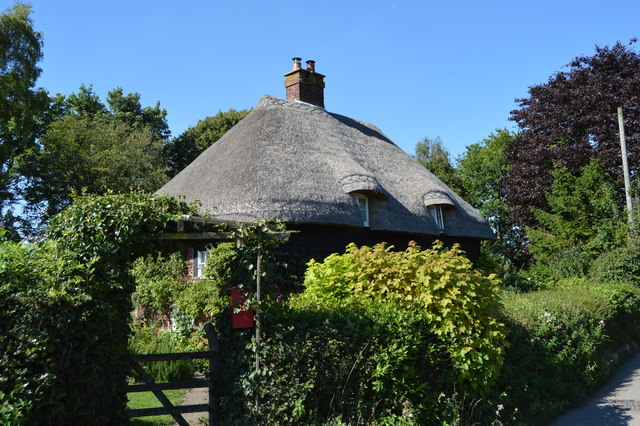
Thatched cottage

Originally "Wymelyngewolde", from the combination of the possible personal name of "Wimel" and the Old English "ingas" meaning the "people of" and "wald" as a "forest". Thus Womanswold, or 'Wymelyngewolde', means the "forest of the people of Wimel".

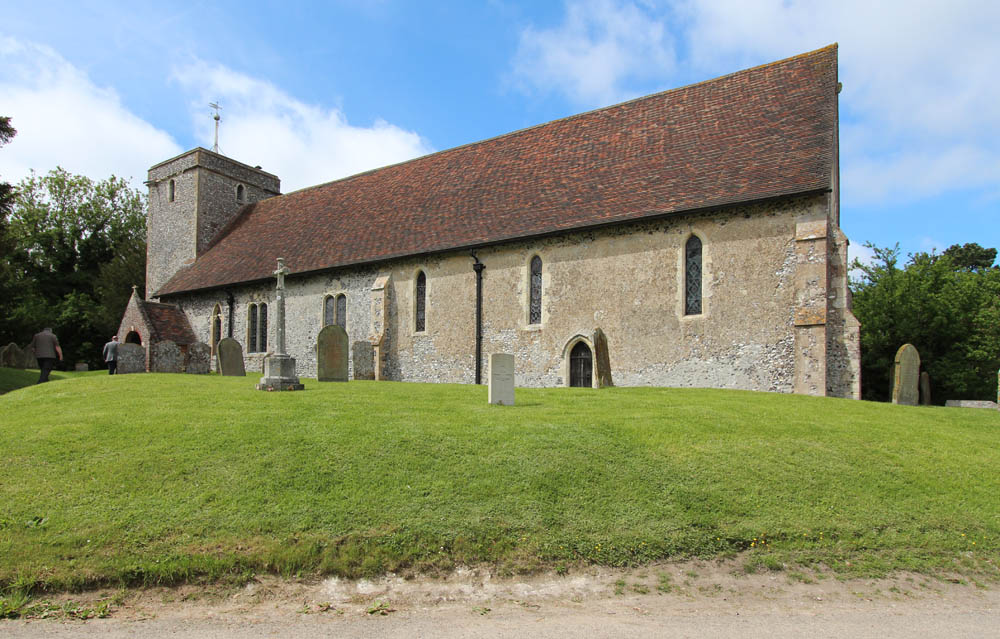
St Margaret's Church

The church of St, Margaret of Antioch covers all three hamlets, in Womenswold proper rather than the woodland, cereal and pasture fields within its bounds. A small mediaeval building without any side aisles, it is part of the Barham Downs group of churches.

== See also ==
- Listed buildings in Womenswold
