= Woolage Village =

Village in Kent, England

Coordinates: 51.206°N 1.199°E

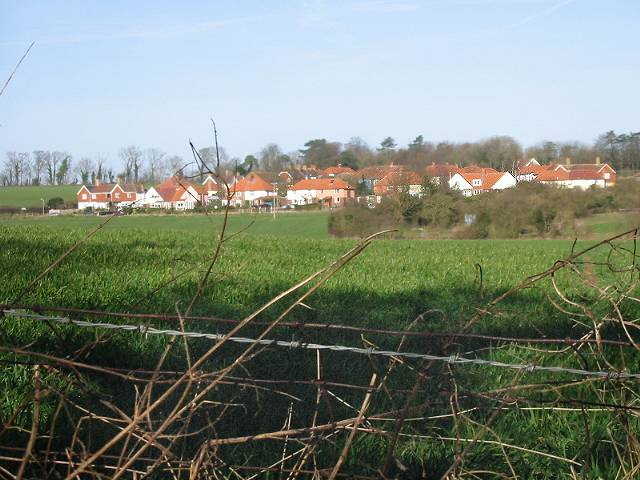
- View of Woolage Village

- Location within Kent
- OS grid reference: TR2350
- District: City of Canterbury
- Shire county: Kent
- Region: South East
- Country: England
- Sovereign state: United Kingdom
- Post town: Canterbury
- Postcode district: CT4
- Police: Kent
- Fire: Kent
- Ambulance: South East Coast

Woolage Village is a former mining village situated midway between Canterbury and Dover in the English county of Kent. It is 1 mile (1.6 km) to the east of the A2 road. Together with Womenswold and Woolage Green, it forms Womenswold parish.

It consists of approximately 52 semi-detached houses built in 1912, to house miners and their families working at the nearby Snowdown Colliery. The village shop and post office was shut in the 1990s and converted to a dwelling.
