= Woolage Green =

Hamlet in Kent, England

Coordinates: 51.20°N 1.202°E

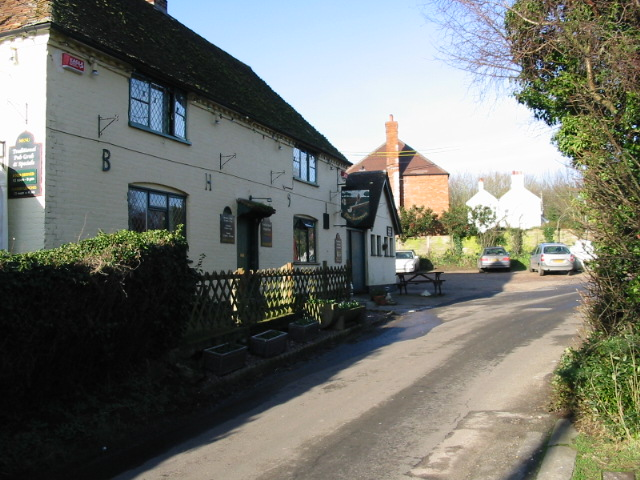
- The Two Sawyers pub, Woolage Green

- Location within Kent
- Population: 0 - 1,000
- OS grid reference: TR2349
- District: City of Canterbury
- Shire county: Kent
- Region: South East
- Country: England
- Sovereign state: United Kingdom
- Post town: Canterbury
- Postcode district: CT4
- Dialling code: 01304
- Police: Kent
- Fire: Kent
- Ambulance: South East Coast

Woolage Green is a small hamlet, situated about 7 miles (11 km) south-east of Canterbury, Kent, England, 1 mile to the east of the A2 road. Together with Womenswold and Woolage Village, it forms Womenswold parish.

== History ==
Originally a downland farming community, Woolage Green consists of some 36 dwellings including one pub, the Two Sawyers.

The village was heavily wooded until the destruction of Woolwich Wood in the 1960s, to make way for farmland.

Historical maps and records also show the village as Woollage Green and Woolwich Green.
