= Alkham =

Village in Kent, England

Coordinates: 51.1347°N 1.2211°E

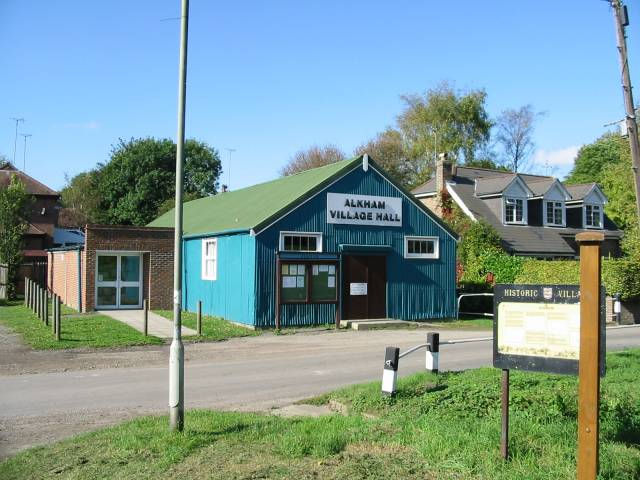
- Alkham village hall

- Location within Kent
- Population: 688 (2011)
- OS grid reference: TR254422
- Civil parish: Alkham
- District: Dover
- Shire county: Kent
- Region: South East
- Country: England
- Sovereign state: United Kingdom
- Post town: DOVER
- Postcode district: CT15
- Dialling code: 01304
- Police: Kent
- Fire: Kent
- Ambulance: South East Coast
- UK Parliament: Dover and Deal

Alkham is a village and civil parish in the Dover district of Kent, England, about five miles west of Dover. Within the parish are the settlements of Chalksole and Ewell Minnis; the parish population was 691 people (2001 census), reducing slightly to 688 at the 2011 Census.

Alkham's Grade I listed Anglican church is dedicated to St Anthony. The former Wesleyan chapel on Slip Lane is now a private residence.

The parishes of Alkham and River form the River ward in the Dover local government district.

== Church of St Anthony ==
Alkham does not appear in the Domesday Book, but the church is mentioned in 1093 as subordinate to Folkestone. In the 13th century the village was described as the Manor of Halcham. St Anthony's Church was given by Hamo de Crevecoeur to St. Radegund's Abbey in Hougham Without in 1258. Upon the dissolution of St. Radegund's Abbey during the dissolution of the monasteries, the site and all of the church possessions were granted to Thomas Cranmer and remained in the Diocese of Canterbury. In 1683, John Hodson cast and hung a ring of four bells in the church. Victorian restoration work was carried out in 1872.

The church has within its possession the stone lid of the coffin of Herbert de Averenches, a monk from St. Randegund's Abbey, which has a 12th-century inscription, believed to be one of the oldest in Kent.

== See also ==
- Listed buildings in Alkham
