= Hoaden =

Hamlet in Kent, England

Coordinates: 51.29°N 1.25°E

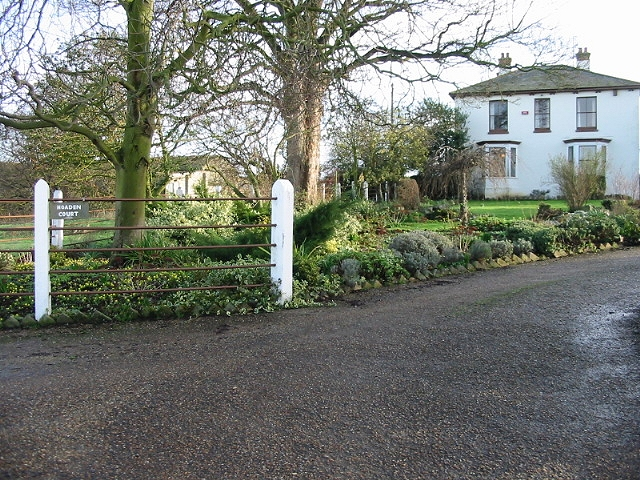
- Hoaden Court, Hoaden

- Location within Kent
- OS grid reference: TR2760
- District: Dover
- Shire county: Kent
- Region: South East
- Country: England
- Sovereign state: United Kingdom
- Post town: Canterbury
- Postcode district: CT3 2
- Police: Kent
- Fire: Kent
- Ambulance: South East Coast

Hoaden is a hamlet situated one mile (1.6 km) to the east of Elmstone, Kent, England. Within the hamlet is Hoaden Court.
