= Tolsford Hill BT Tower =

Telecommunication tower in Kent, England

Tolsford Hill
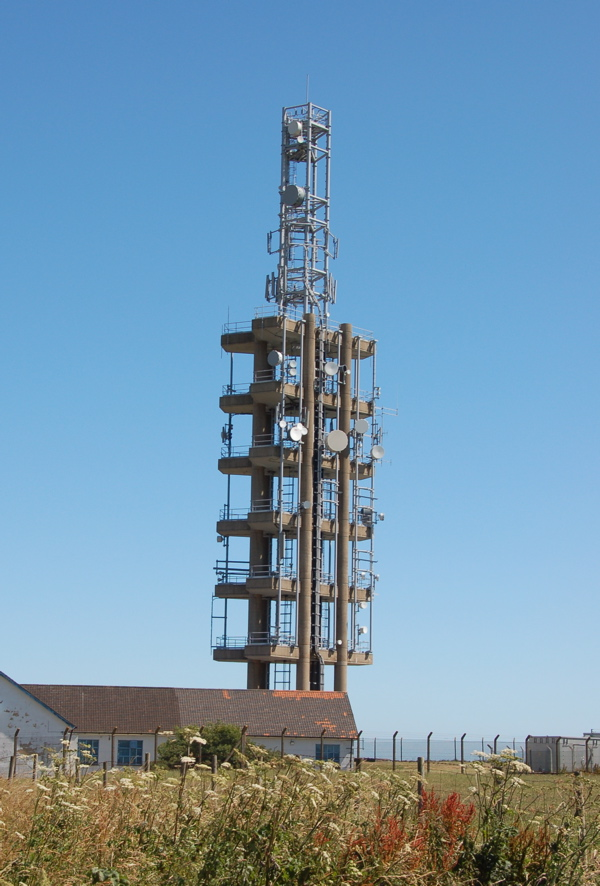
- Tolsford Hill BT Tower

- Location within Kent
- Location: Folkestone, Kent
- Coordinates: 51.1075°N 1.084722°E
- Grid reference: TR1591038829
- Built: 1975

Tolsford Hill BT Tower is a telecommunication tower built of reinforced concrete at Tolsford Hill on the North Downs near Folkestone, Kent. Tolsford Hill BT Tower is one of the few British towers built of reinforced concrete and is 67.36 metres (221 ft) high.

== History ==
From 1954 television was transferred to France by a link from Lenham to Swingate to Cassel.

Construction of the £80,000 200-ft tower, at Tolsford Hill, began in March 1959. Transmissions would be sent over the English Channel to the RTF tower at Fiennes, Pas-de-Calais. The first broadcasts were on Wednesday 1 July 1959. In 1960 it had 273 circuits.

On 27 April 1960 a television transmission was sent across the English Channel of colour television, in 625 lines. This was the system designed by Henri de France. The French would adopt 625 lines, to begin in 1963.

By the late 1960s, two more communication sites were built at Flimwell, in East Sussex, and Fairseat, near Stansted, Kent, for transmission to London. In 1822 Thomas Frederick Colby had put lighthouses at these same points across the English Channel.

Construction of a new £350,000 210-ft tower began in December 1973, to begin operation by 1975. It would carry 3,600 circuits. It was built by Holst & Co (became Norwest Holst).

== See also ==
- British Telecom microwave network
- PEC (cable system)
- Telecommunications towers in the United Kingdom
