= West Studdal =

Village in Kent, England

Coordinates: 51.205°N 1.305°E

- Location within Kent
- District: Dover
- Shire county: Kent
- Region: South East
- Country: England
- Sovereign state: United Kingdom
- Post town: Dover
- Postcode district: CT15
- Police: Kent
- Fire: Kent
- Ambulance: South East Coast

West Studdal is a village near Dover in Kent, England. The population of the village is included in the civil parish of Sutton. Studdal derives from the Old English Stōd-weald; the wood where the horses were kept.
