= Woodnesborough =

Village in Kent, England

Coordinates: 51.2636°N 1.3100°E

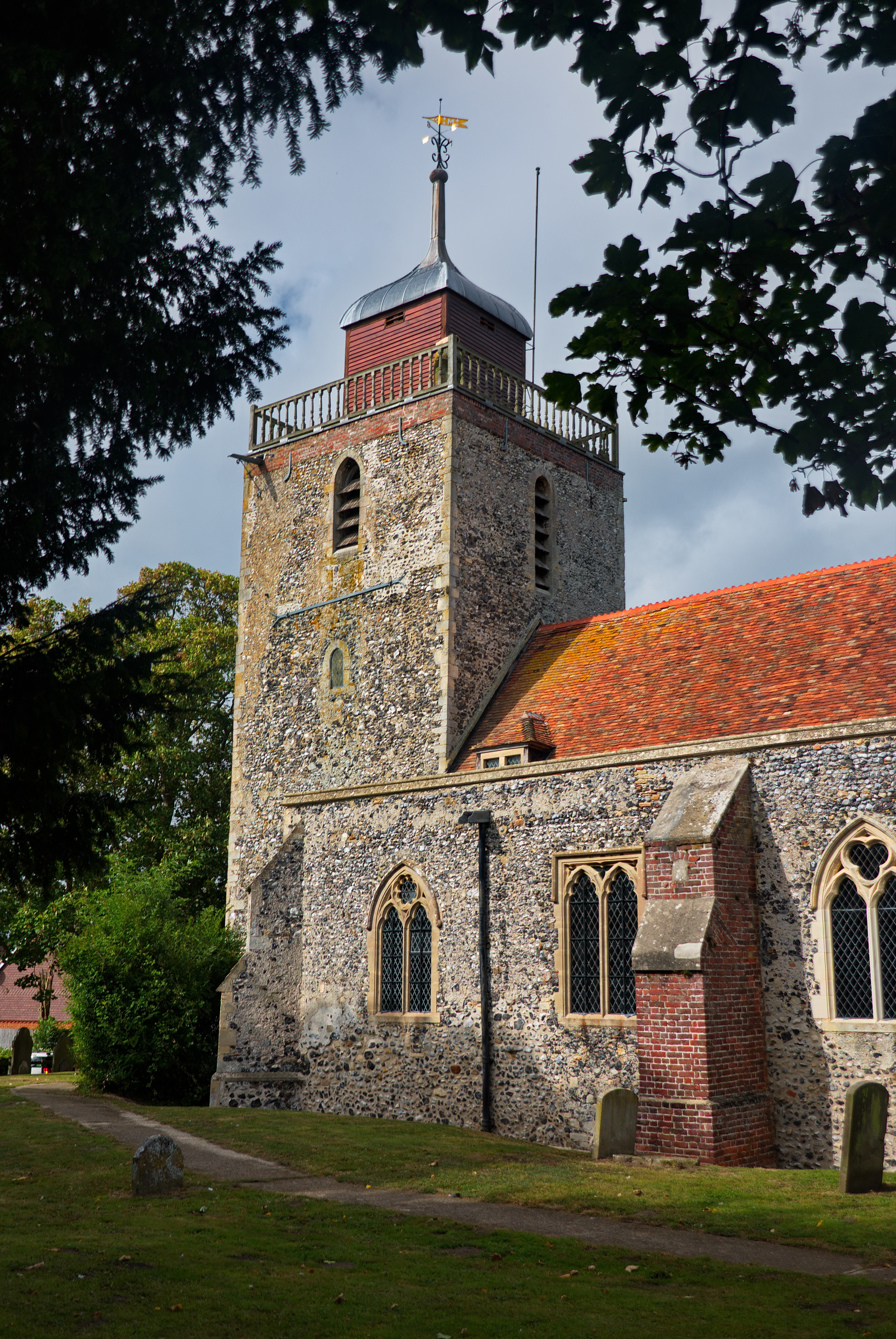
- St Mary the Blessed Virgin Church, Woodnesborough

- Location within Kent
- Population: 1,066 (2011 census)
- OS grid reference: TR310568
- District: Dover
- Shire county: Kent
- Region: South East
- Country: England
- Sovereign state: United Kingdom
- Post town: Sandwich
- Postcode district: CT13
- Dialling code: 01304
- Police: Kent
- Fire: Kent
- Ambulance: South East Coast
- UK Parliament: Herne Bay and Sandwich

Woodnesborough (/ˈwɪnzbrə/ WINZ-brə) is a village in the Dover District of Kent, England, 2 miles (3.2 km) west of Sandwich. The population taken at the 2011 census included Coombe as well as Marshborough, and totalled 1,066. There is a Grade II* listed Anglican church dedicated to St Mary the Virgin.

== History ==
Its name is first attested in the Domesday Book of 1086 as Golles-Wanesberge, with forms like Wodnesbeorge being attested a little later, around 1100, and as 'Wodnesbergh' in 1484. The name is believed to have meant Woden's hill/mound (Old English Wōdnes burh) after Anglo-Saxon god Woden (the English cognate of the Norse Odin, known in Proto-Germanic as Wodanaz); though some of the spellings also suggest *wænnes beorg ('hill of the mound'), from Old English wenn, wænn 'a tumour, blister, mound'. At the end of the eighteenth century there is a record of a burial mound beside the church, but the settlement also boasts a hill which could equally well have been described as a burh in Old English.

The village was once served by East Kent Light Railway and can now be reached by bus services from Sandwich.

There was also a post office, which closed at the end of January 2008.

== Listed buildings ==
St Mary the Blessed Virgin Church: the village's 13th-century Anglican church is Grade II* listed, with 14th-century alterations and a Victorian restoration in 1884 by Ewan Christian. The building is made of flint and rubble and boasts an unusual ogee cupola, a design feature shared by nearby Sandwich's St Peter's Church.

Woodnesborough Village Hall: the building, a former school, dates from the 19th century.

Sundial north of the Church of St Mary the Virgin: dating from 1738 with the inscription "Woodnesborough W IB RG 1738".

Tomb Chest to Harrison family: situated about 2 metres W of Church of St Mary, and dating from 1777.

Summerfield House: an early 18th-century house with red brick and plain tiled roof.

Barn about 20m E of Summerfield House: a 17th-century barn now converted to a garage.
