= Horden, Kent =

Village in Kent, England

Coordinates: 51.134670°N 0.503600°E

Horden
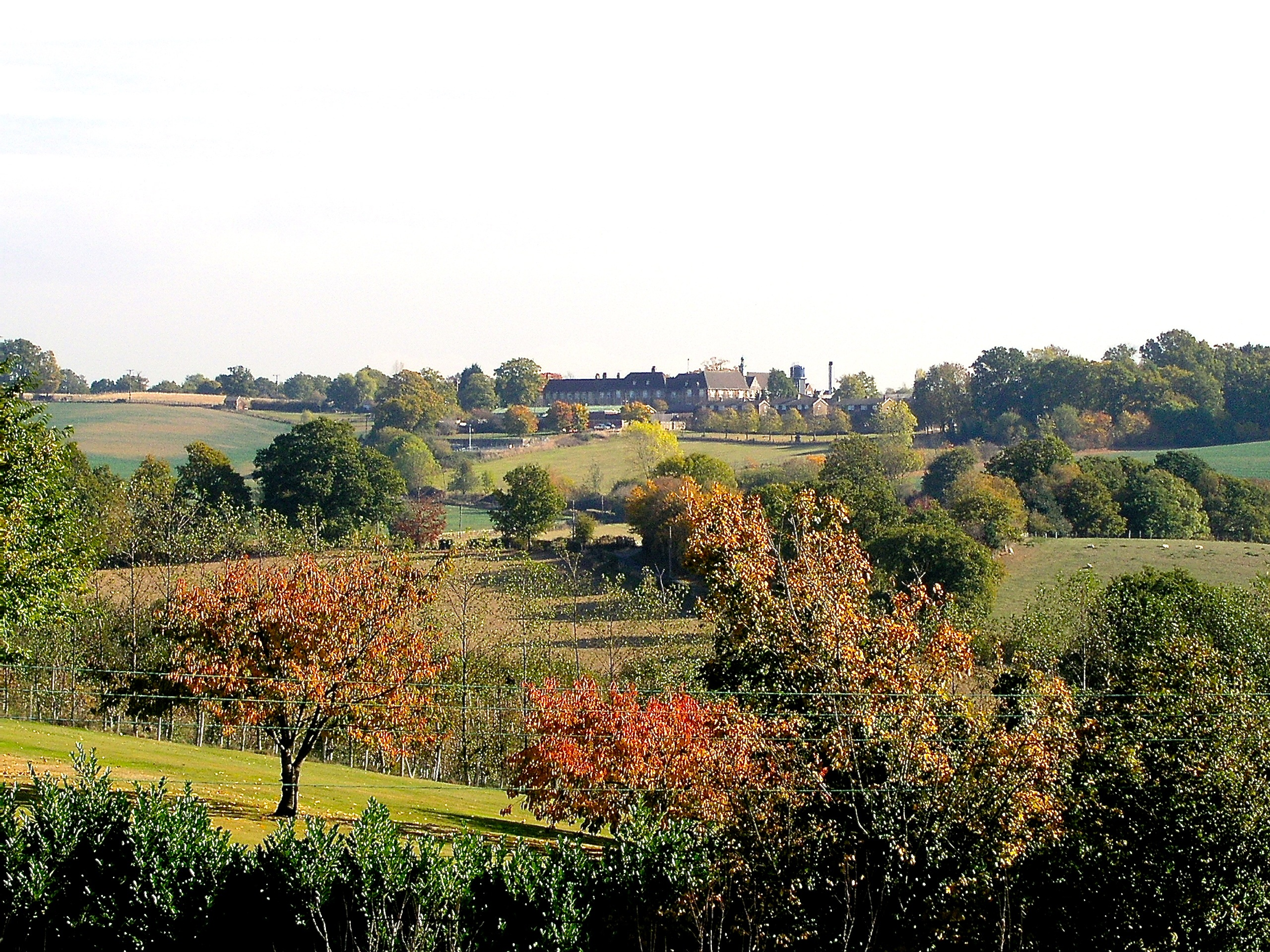
- View of Blantyre from Worms Hill

- Location within Kent
- District: Maidstone
- Shire county: Kent
- Region: South East
- Country: England
- Sovereign state: United Kingdom
- Post town: Cranbrook
- Postcode district: TN17
- Police: Kent
- Fire: Kent
- Ambulance: South East Coast

Horden is a village in the Maidstone district of Kent, England. The population is included in the civil parish of Goudhurst.

The village takes its name from the Horden family: Edward Horden was a courtier to three Tudor monarchs, Edward VI, Mary I and Elizabeth I, serving as Clerk of the Green Cloth. He lived at Finchcocks manor house.

The now-closed prison HMP Blantyre House is located at Horden, on Roundgreen Lane.
