= Kingsnorth =

Village in Kent, England

Coordinates: 51.1178°N 0.8615°E

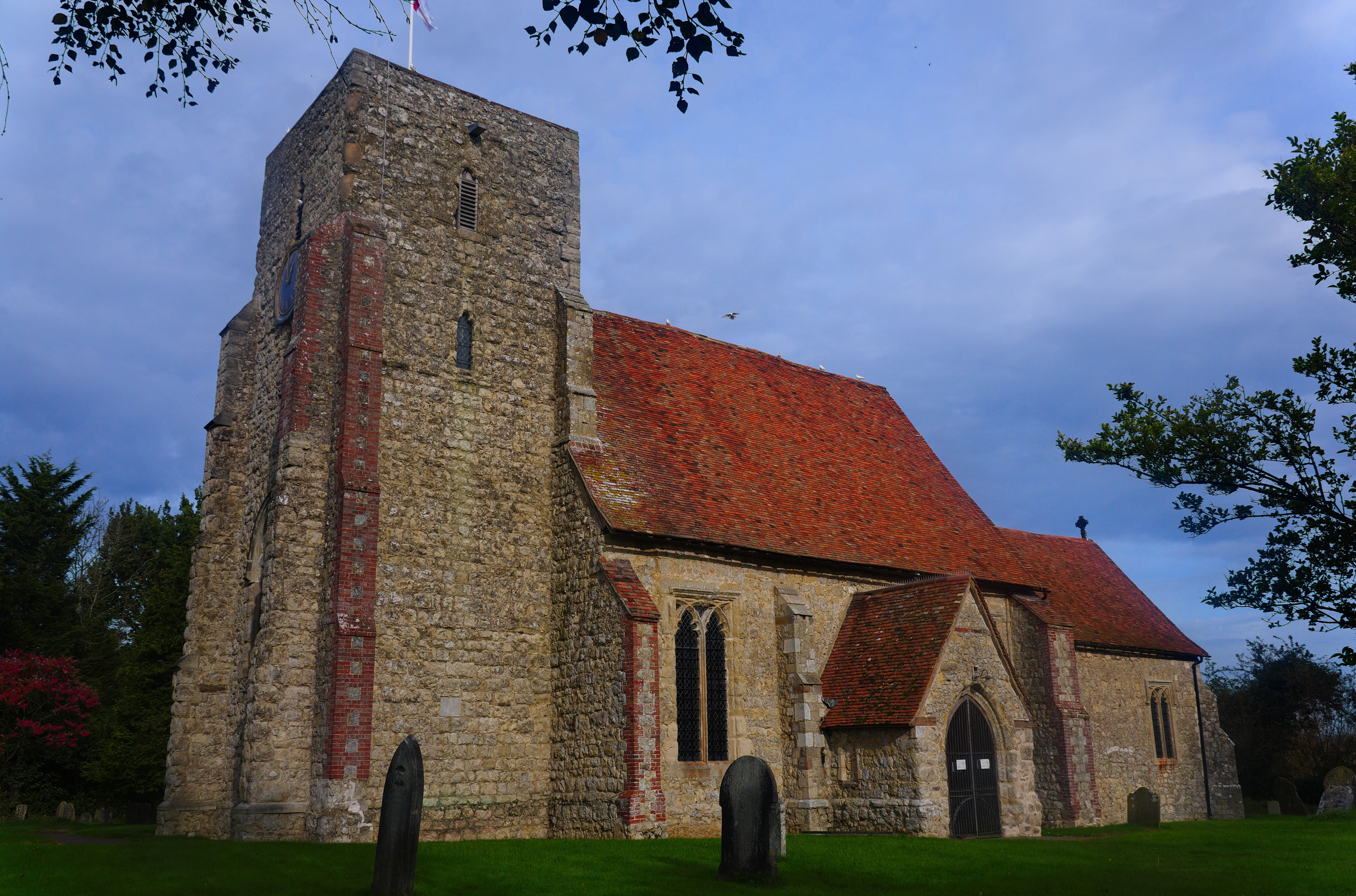
- St Michael and All Angels Church, Kingsnorth

- Location within Kent
- Area: 12.46 km^{2} (4.81 sq mi)
- Population: 11,243 (Civil Parish 2011)
  - Density: 902/km^{2} (2,340/sq mi)
- OS grid reference: TR002393
- Civil parish: Kingsnorth
- District: Ashford
- Shire county: Kent
- Region: South East
- Country: England
- Sovereign state: United Kingdom
- Post town: ASHFORD
- Postcode district: TN23
- Dialling code: 01233
- Police: Kent
- Fire: Kent
- Ambulance: South East Coast
- UK Parliament: Weald of Kent
- Website: Kingsnorth Parish Council

Kingsnorth is a village and civil parish in the Borough of Ashford in Kent, England. The civil parish adjoins the town of Ashford.

== Features ==
The Greensand Way, a long distance footpath stretching from Haslemere in Surrey to Hamstreet in Kent, passes through the parish on the final stretch.

The hamlet of Stubbs Cross is close to the village.

The village's parish church is dedicated to St Michael and All Angels; the nave in its current state dates from the fourteenth century. The stone used in the building is Kentish ragstone. The church has a stained glass window which depicts Saint George and the Dragon and which is thought to date from 1400.

The large population of the parish is due to housing estates adjoining Ashford falling within the parish boundaries. These include Park Farm which is also the site of a large supermarket.

== History ==
A Roman settlement was discovered at the crossing of two important Roman roads on Westhawk Farm. The centre of the settlement has been preserved unexcavated as an open space, but before building began on the rest of the site, part of a Roman road was uncovered. There was evidence to show that there had been timber buildings at the side of the road, some of which were associated with ironworking. A shrine or temple was also found, with a water-hole which contained 74, mostly 2nd-century coins probably left as offerings. Over 250 coins and many other artefacts were discovered on the site together with a Roman cemetery and an Iron Age burial.

A transcript of the Domesday Book of 1086 indicates that there was a settlement at Kingsnorth controlled by the Manor of Wye. One explanation of the name is that it derived from the Old English cyninges snad, detached land belonging to a royal estate. Another suggestion is that the settlement took its name from Jutish people 'Kyn', kin folk, who settled on a wooded hill or 'snode'. Other early variations of the name are Kyngsnode; Kynsnoth, Kyngesnothe and Kingessnode.

There was a moated mediaeval manor house north-east of the church; the site of the house is now covered by modern buildings but the moat still exists.

An industrial school for boys, Stanhope Industrial School, was set up in the village by Kent County Council in 1874. It was evacuated to Brecon in 1940, and did not return after the war.

The RAF and USAAF occupied RAF Kingsnorth, an airfield close to the village, during World War II.

There is a Second World War pillbox near Westhawk Farm which is listed. The list entry reads, in part, "The Type 24 pillbox at Westhawk Farm survives well, and serves as a reminder of the strategic importance of this part of Kent in the communication network of south eastern England, during one of the greatest conflicts of the 20th century".

== Transport ==
Kingsnorth is bisected by the A2070 Ashford to Hamstreet road. It briefly has a dual carriageway within it, as well as along its nearest border with Ashford, which serves as its main approach road. The road network is otherwise almost a wide grid with slight curves.

In 2018 it was proposed to give the village its own station on the Marshlink Line. After an assessment, it was decided that there was no viable business case, and the plan was not pursued.

The village is served by regular buses to Ashford.

== See also ==
- Listed buildings in Kingsnorth
