= Church Whitfield =

Village in Kent, England

Coordinates: 51.1655°N 1.303°E

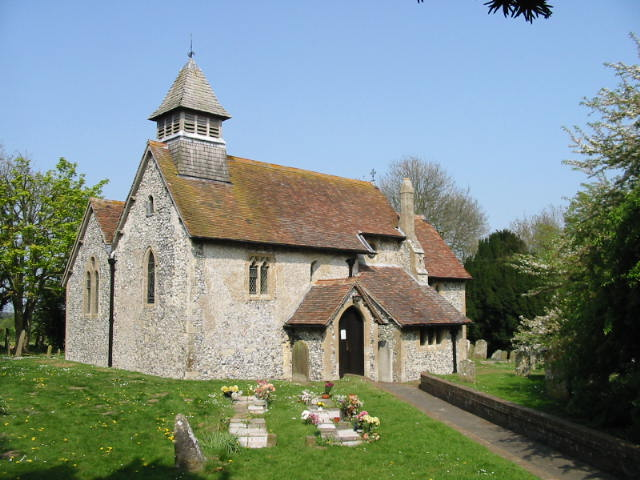
- St Peter's Church, Church Whitfield

- Location within Kent
- Population: 1,303
- OS grid reference: TR3145
- District: Dover
- Shire county: Kent
- Region: South East
- Country: England
- Sovereign state: United Kingdom
- Post town: Dover
- Postcode district: CT16 3
- Police: Kent
- Fire: Kent
- Ambulance: South East Coast

Church Whitfield is a village in the civil parish of Whitfield, and just north of Dover, in Kent, England. Village population is included in Whitfield civil parish. Part of the village is called Pineham.

St Peter's Church is a 10th-century Saxon Church largely rebuilt in Norman times, although the church is first mentioned in 762 AD. It was restored and enlarged in 1894 by Ewan Christian.
