= San Francesco a Monte Mario =

Church in Rome, Italy

Coordinates: 41°56′10.8″N 12°26′14.5″E

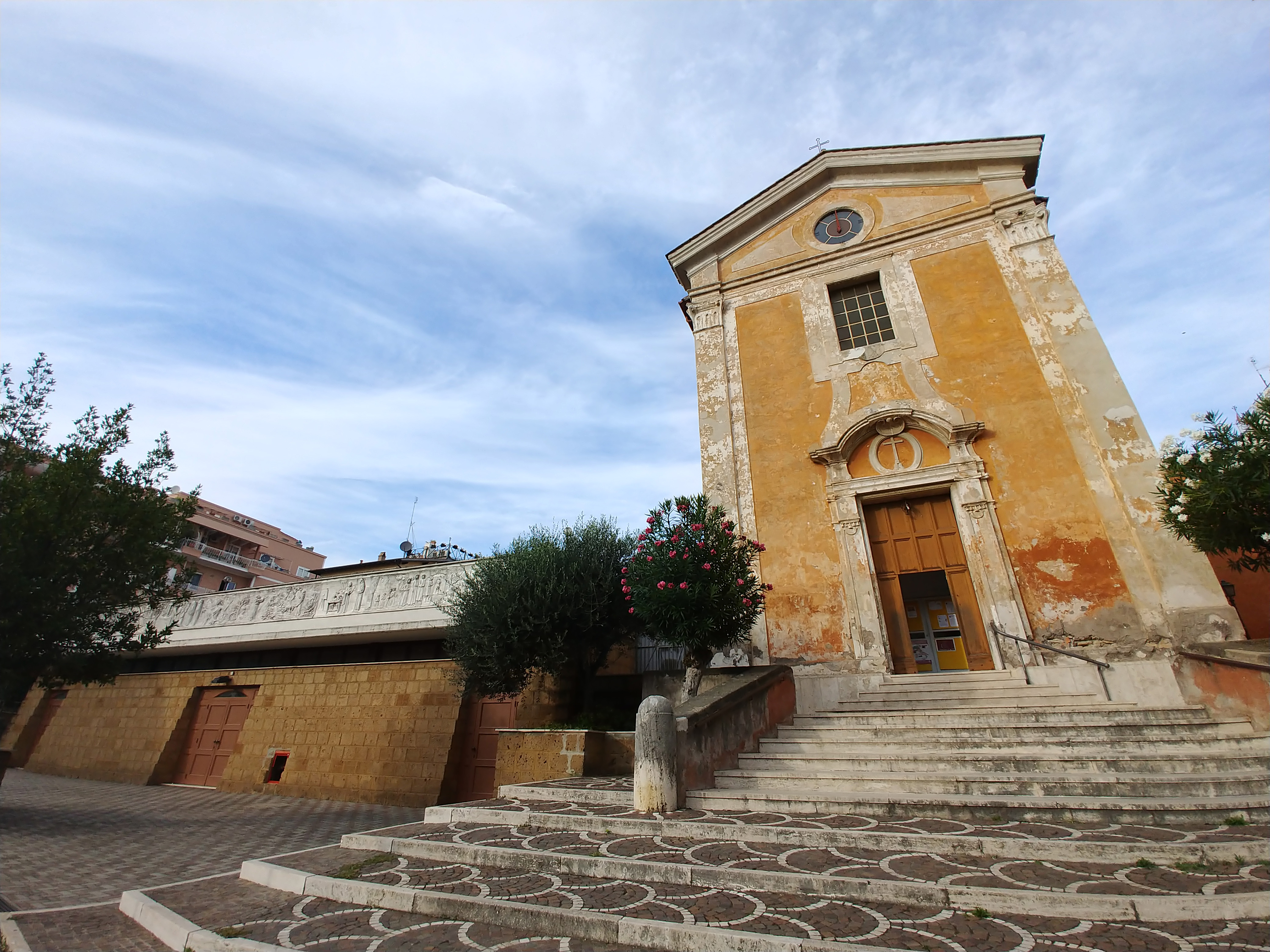
Exterior of the old and new church.

San Francesco d'Assisi a Monte Mario encompass two Roman Catholic churches located in Piazza di Monte Gaudio #8, in Rome, Italy.

== Description ==
Presently, the site has a modern church and an older church structures. The older church and an adjacent monastery, built circa 1670, were erected by the Hieronymite order. It was initially titled Sant'Onofrio in Campagna and located in the Borgo Clementino. Located on the entry of the Via Francigena towards central Rome, the church changed the dedication to St Francis of Assisi. It was made a parish church by pope Clement XI.

In 2003, a new church was designed by Anna Claudia Cenciarini. The church has a sculpted frieze. It is presently under the administration of the Scolopi order.

== Gallery ==
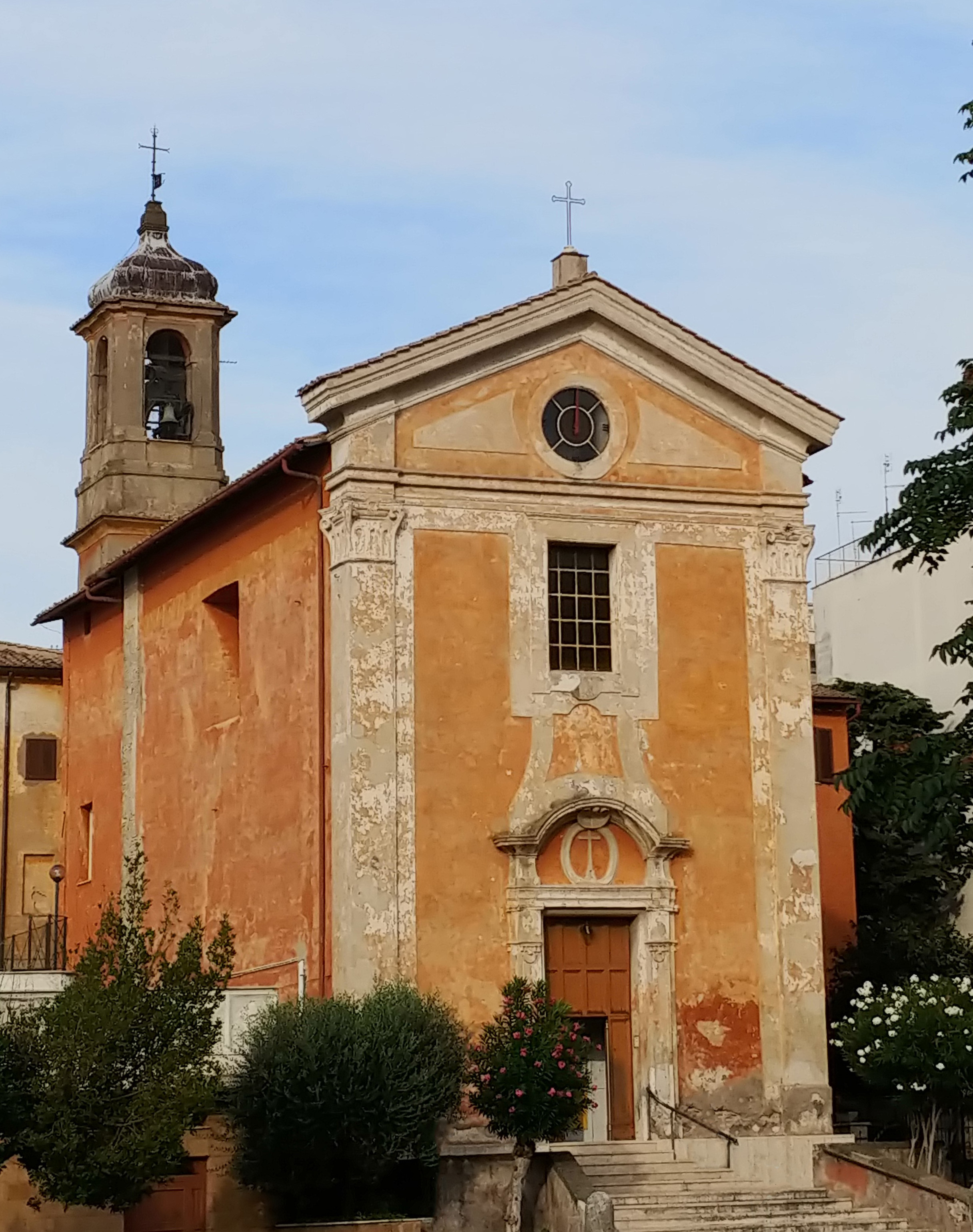
Exterior of old church

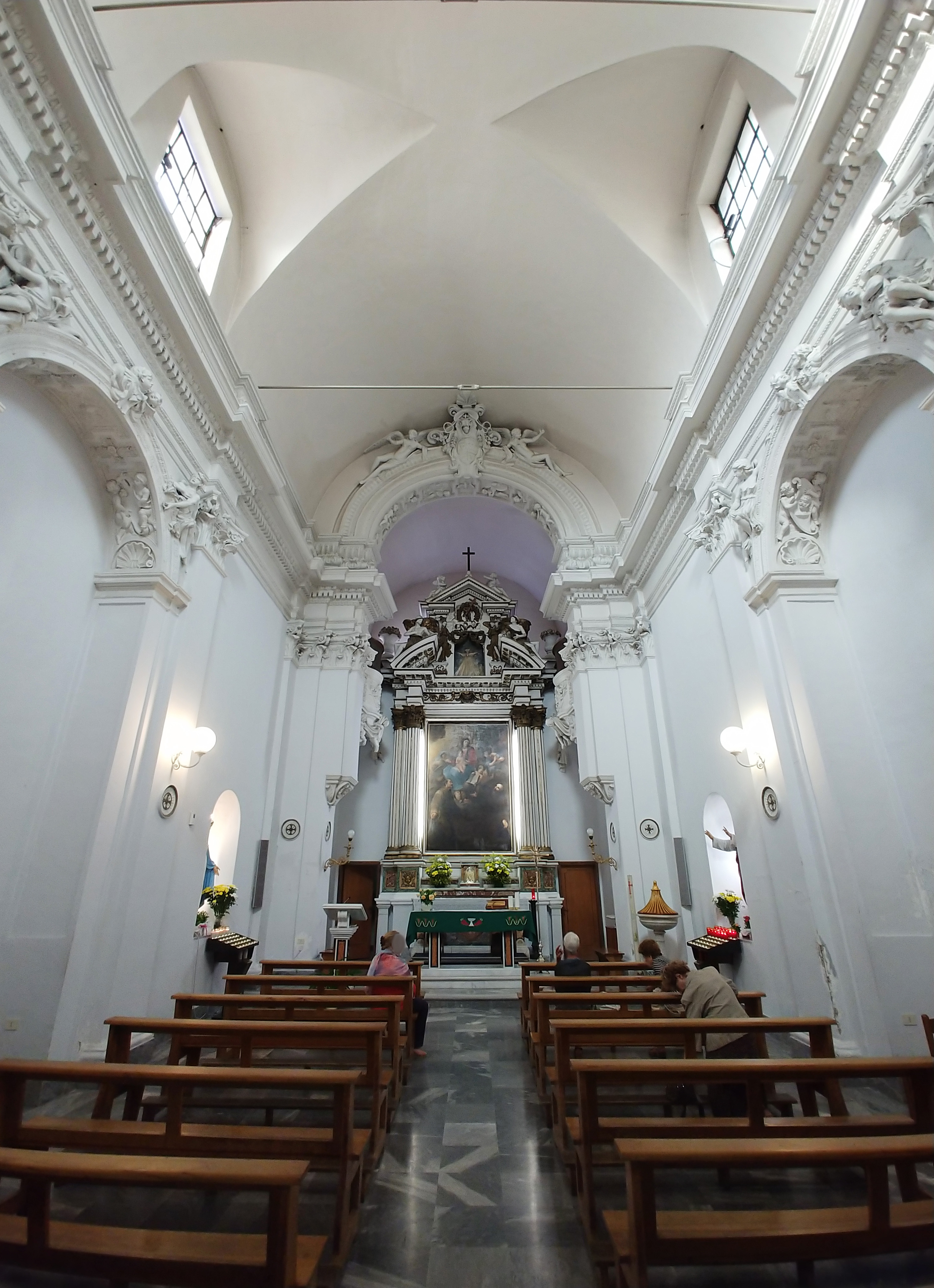
Interior of old church

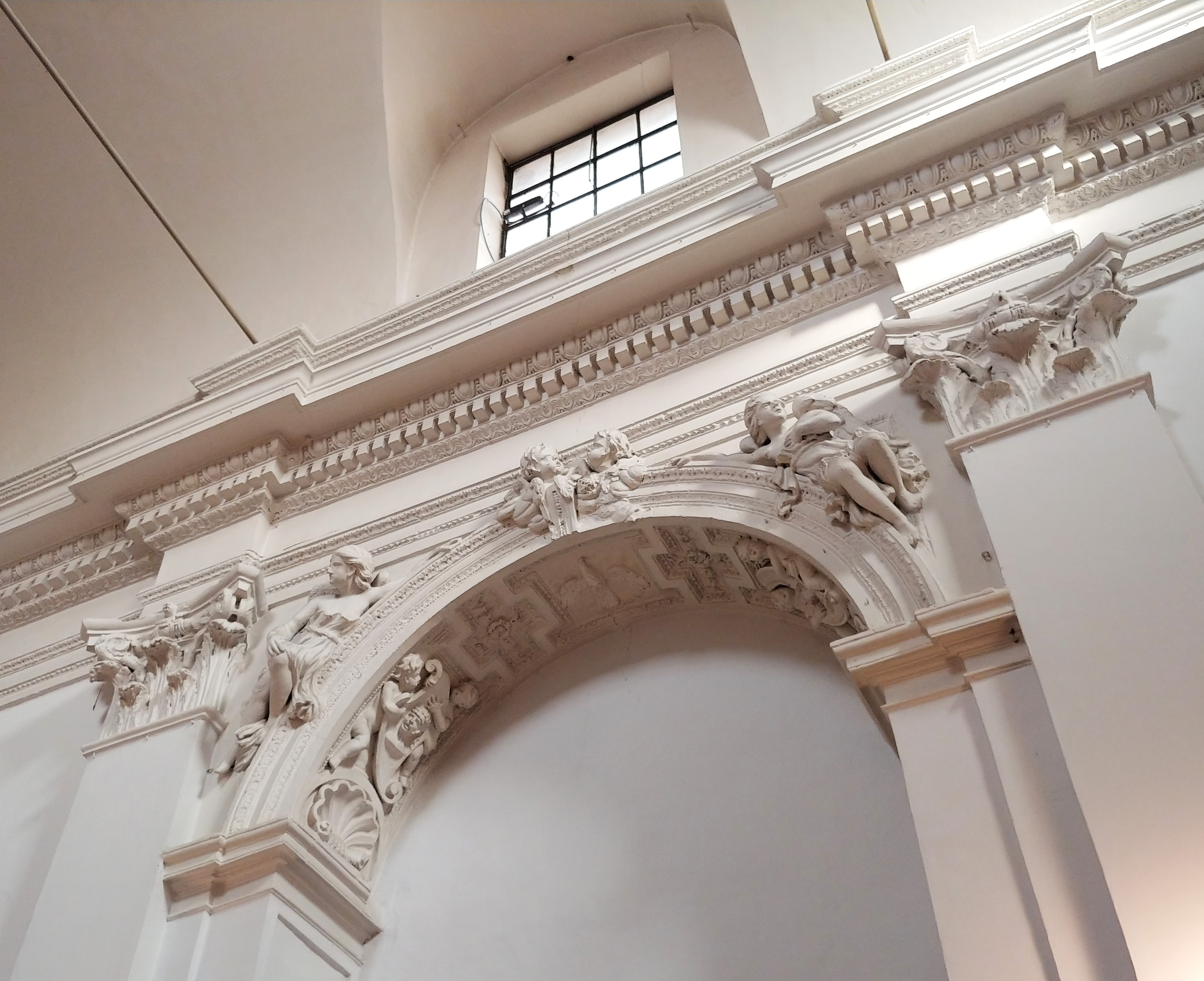
Detail of stucco in old church

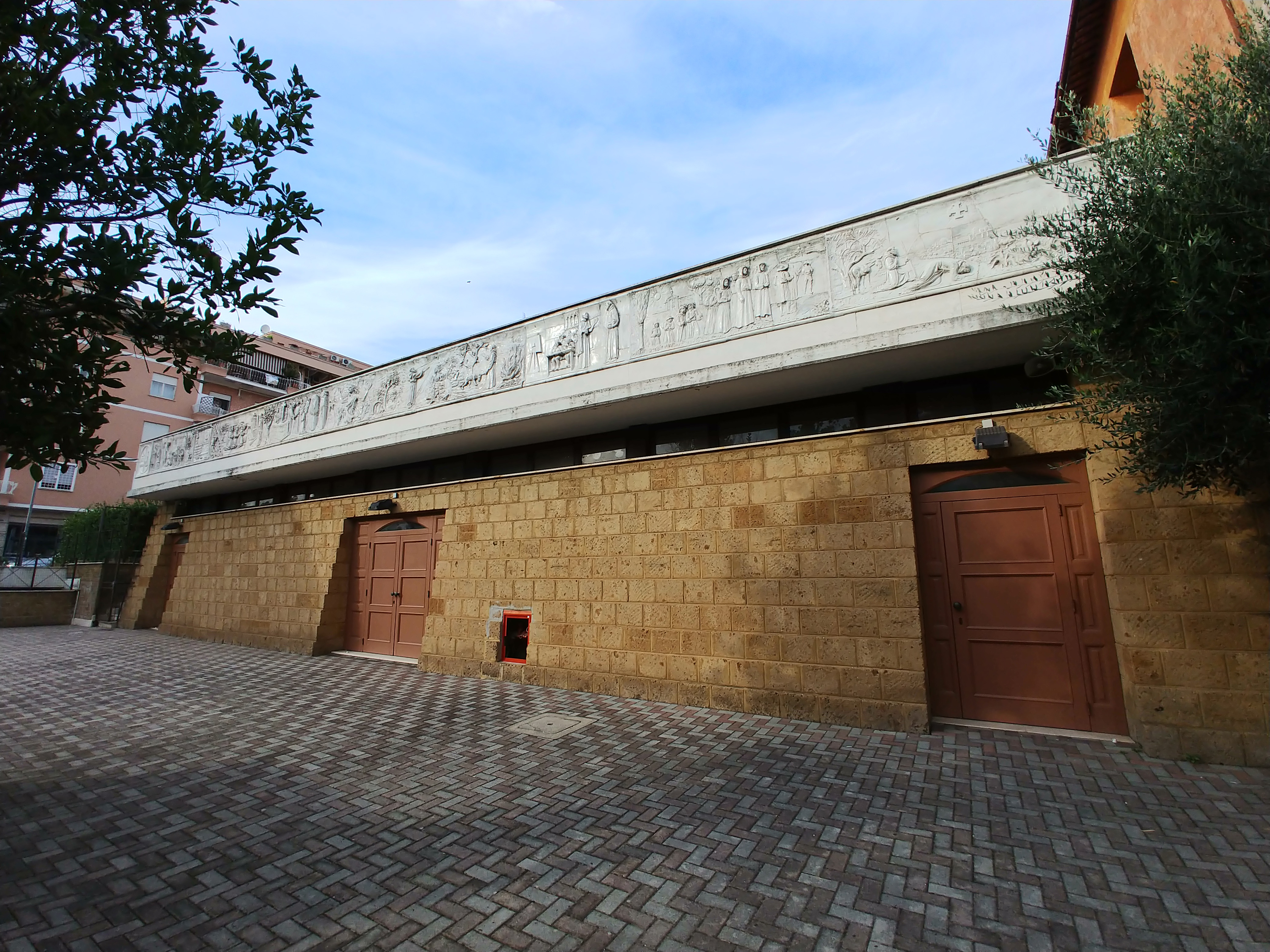
Layout of new church

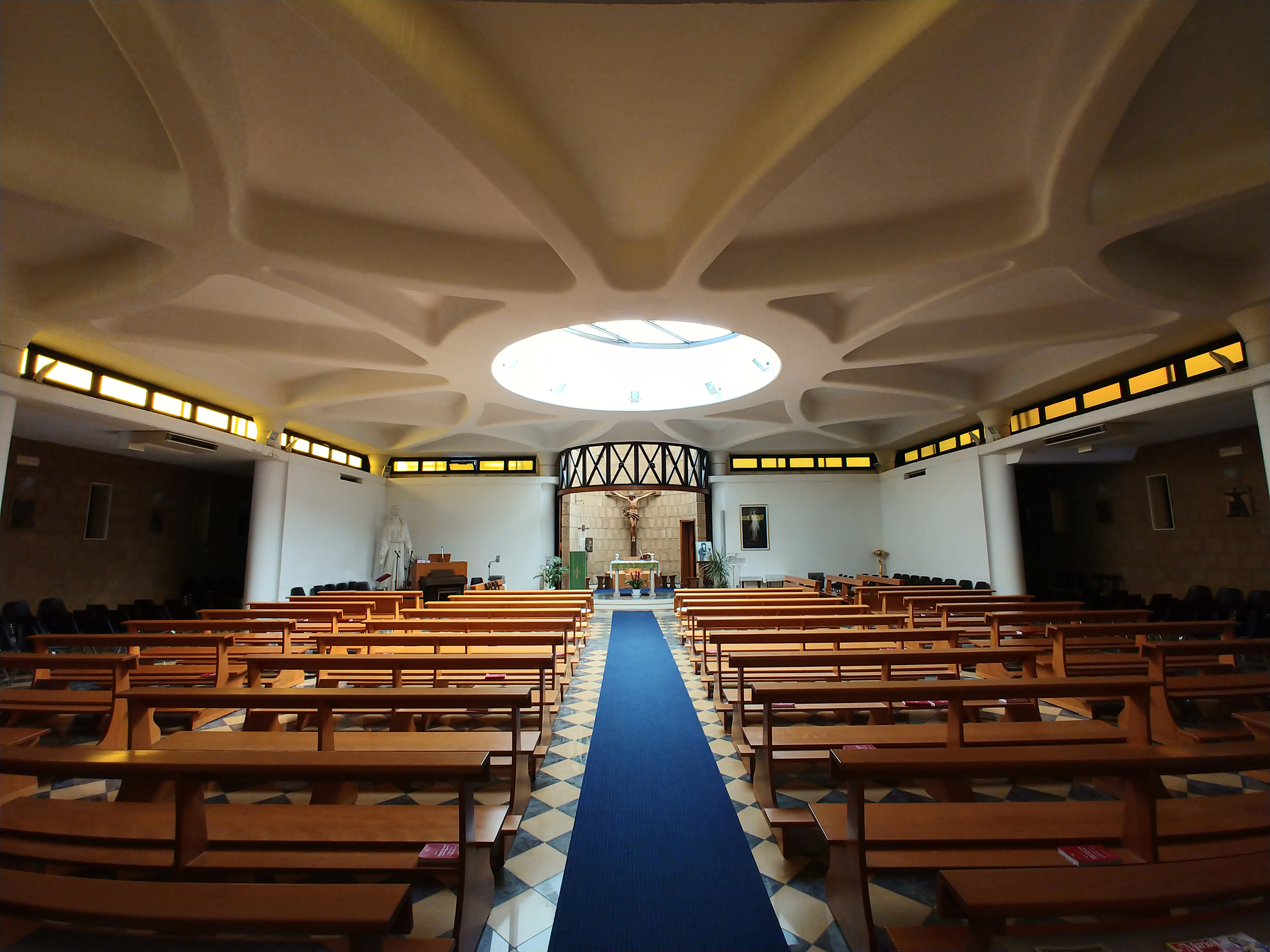
Interior of new church

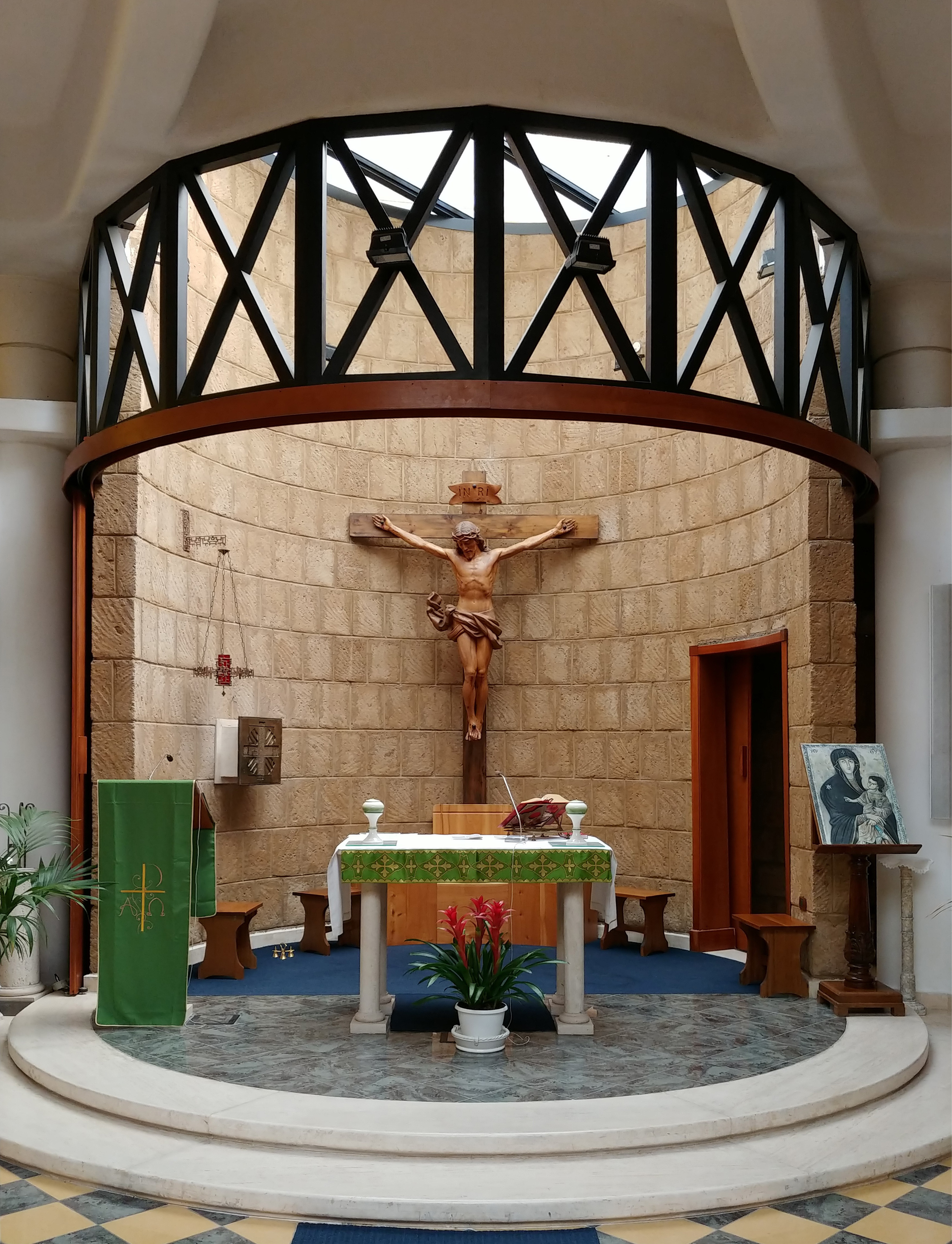
Apse of new church
