= Seveux-Motey =

- Commune
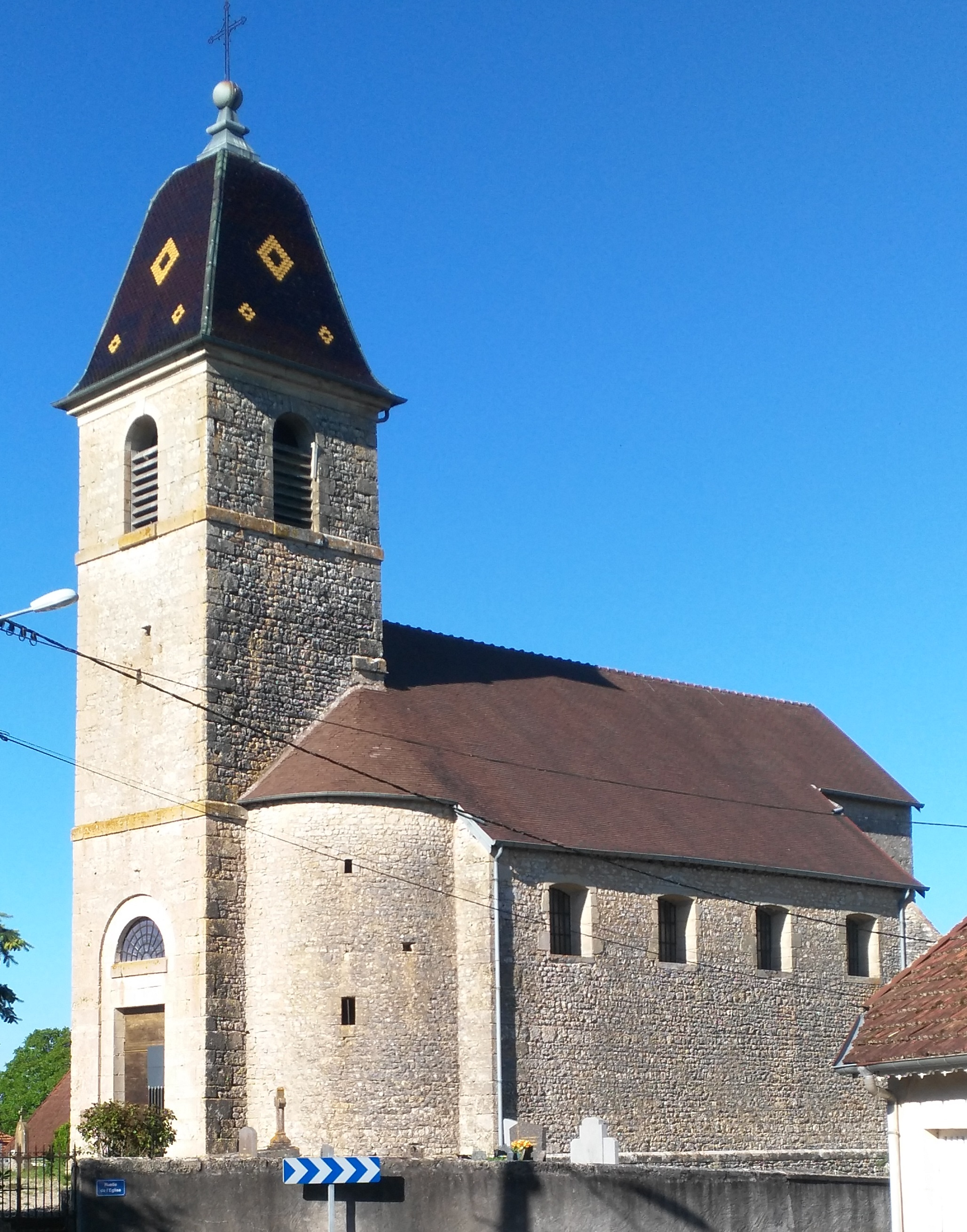
- The church in Motey
- Location of Seveux-Motey
- Location within France Location within Bourgogne-Franche-Comté
- Coordinates: 47°33′28″N 5°44′57″E
- Country: France
- Region: Bourgogne-Franche-Comté
- Department: Haute-Saône
- Arrondissement: Vesoul
- Canton: Scey-sur-Saône-et-Saint-Albin
- Intercommunality: Quatre Rivières
- Area^{1}: 19.88 km^{2} (7.68 sq mi)
- Highest elevation: 260 m (850 ft)
- Lowest elevation: 192 m (630 ft)
- Population (2023): 471
  - Density: 23.7/km^{2} (61.4/sq mi)
- Time zone: UTC+01:00 (CET)
  - Summer (DST): UTC+02:00 (CEST)
- INSEE/Postal code: 70491 /70130
- ^{1} French Land Register data, which excludes lakes, ponds, glaciers > 1 km^{2} (0.386 sq mi or 247 acres) and river estuaries.

Seveux-Motey (French pronunciation: [səvø mɔtɛ]) is a commune in the Haute-Saône department in the region of Bourgogne-Franche-Comté in eastern France. It was established on 1 January 2019 by merger of the former communes of Seveux (the seat) and Motey-sur-Saône.

== See also ==
- Communes of the Haute-Saône department
