= Vanclans =

- Part of Les Premiers-Sapins
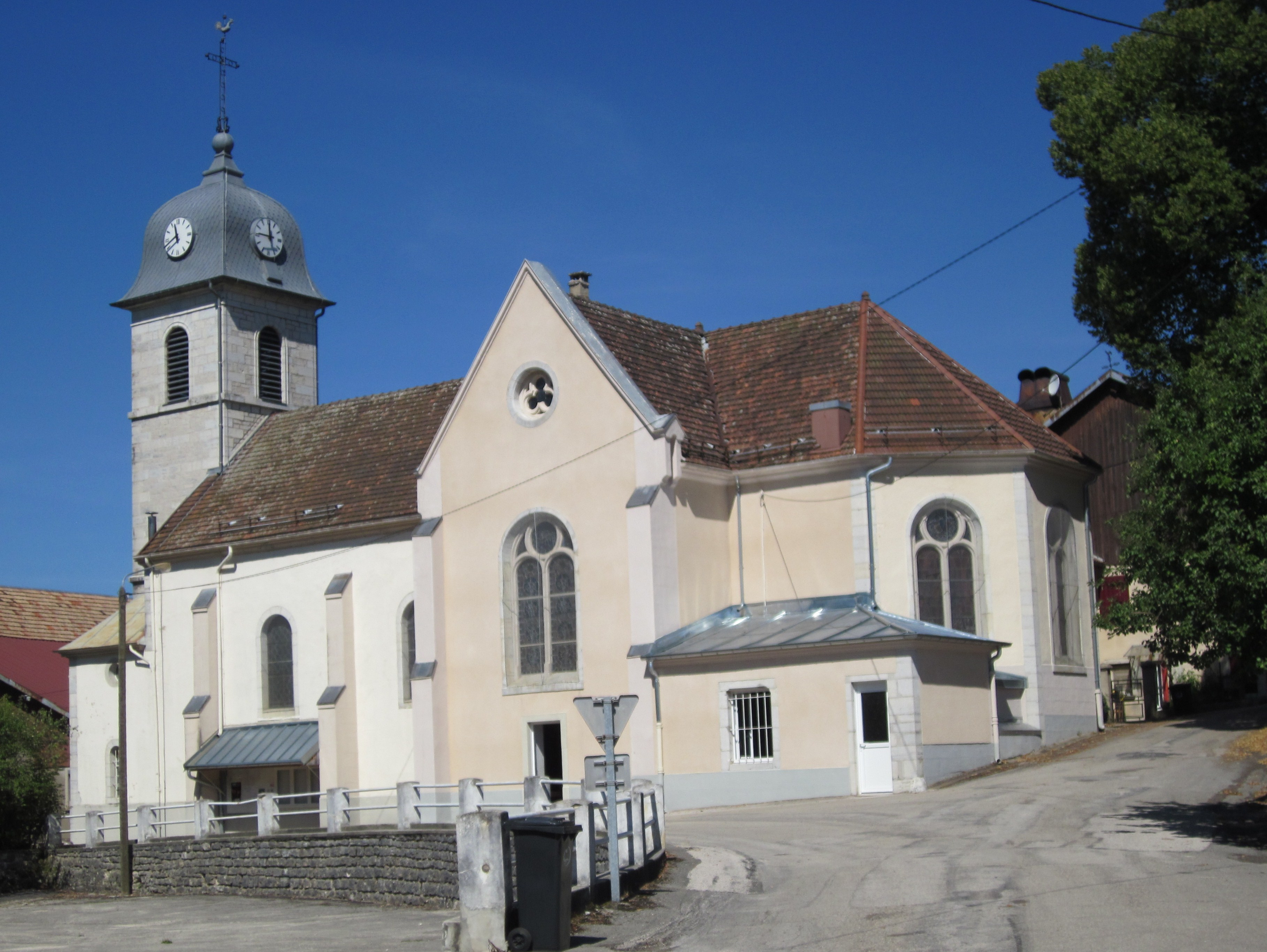
- Church Notre-Dame des Anges
- Location of Vanclans
- Location within France Location within Bourgogne-Franche-Comté
- Coordinates: 47°06′04″N 6°21′43″E
- Country: France
- Region: Bourgogne-Franche-Comté
- Department: Doubs
- Arrondissement: Pontarlier
- Canton: Valdahon
- Commune: Les Premiers-Sapins
- Area^{1}: 9.6 km^{2} (3.7 sq mi)
- Highest elevation: 978 m (3,209 ft)
- Lowest elevation: 690 m (2,260 ft)
- Population (2019): 213
  - Density: 22/km^{2} (57/sq mi)
- Time zone: UTC+01:00 (CET)
  - Summer (DST): UTC+02:00 (CEST)
- Postal code: 25580
- ^{1} French Land Register data, which excludes lakes, ponds, glaciers > 1 km^{2} (0.386 sq mi or 247 acres) and river estuaries.

Vanclans (French pronunciation: [vɑ̃klɑ̃]) is a former commune in the Doubs department in the Bourgogne-Franche-Comté region in eastern France.

== Geography ==
Vanclans lies 8 km (5.0 mi) west of Vercel and 10 km (6.2 mi) southeast of Valdahon. It is nestled between two hills at the foot of the first slopes of evergreens.

== History ==
Sir Guillaume de Cicon was from Cicon near Vanclans, the meagre remains of the family castle sit above Vanclans. Introduced to King Edwards service by Otto de Grandson. First mentioned 13 November 1276 when he comes to England with a message from Otto de Grandson to King Edward I of England. With the English army in South Wales in 1277. Constable of Rhuddlan Castle between February 1282 and May 1284 including the period of the Siege of Rhuddlan. First Constable of Conwy Castle from its construction until his death in 1310 or 1311.

On 1 January 2016, Athose, Chasnans, Hautepierre-le-Châtelet, Nods, Rantechaux and Vanclans merged becoming one commune called Les Premiers-Sapins.

== See also ==
- Communes of the Doubs department
