= Athose =

- Part of Les Premiers-Sapins
- Location of Athose
- Location within France Location within Bourgogne-Franche-Comté
- Coordinates: 47°04′41″N 6°18′36″E
- Country: France
- Region: Bourgogne-Franche-Comté
- Department: Doubs
- Arrondissement: Pontarlier
- Canton: Valdahon
- Commune: Les Premiers-Sapins
- Area^{1}: 7.63 km^{2} (2.95 sq mi)
- Highest elevation: 882 m (2,894 ft)
- Lowest elevation: 540 m (1,770 ft)
- Population (2019): 205
  - Density: 26.9/km^{2} (69.6/sq mi)
- Time zone: UTC+01:00 (CET)
  - Summer (DST): UTC+02:00 (CEST)
- Postal code: 25580
- ^{1} French Land Register data, which excludes lakes, ponds, glaciers > 1 km^{2} (0.386 sq mi or 247 acres) and river estuaries.

Athose (French pronunciation: [atoz]) is a former commune in the Doubs department in the Bourgogne-Franche-Comté region in eastern France.

== History ==
On 1 January 2016, Athose, Chasnans, Hautepierre-le-Châtelet, Nods, Rantechaux and Vanclans merged becoming one commune called Les Premiers-Sapins.

== See also ==
- Communes of the Doubs department
