= Les Premiers-Sapins =

- Commune
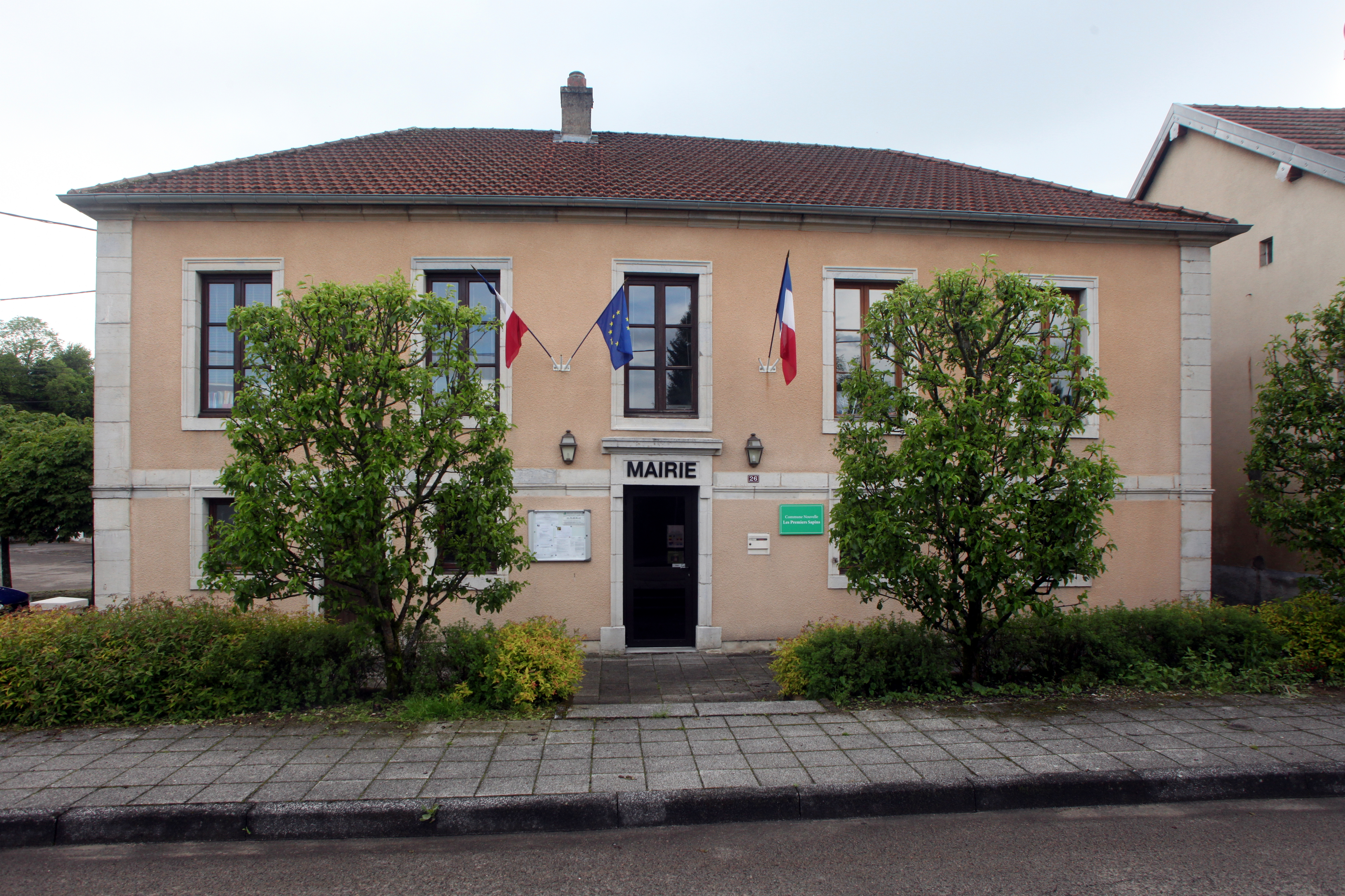
- The town hall in Nods
- Location of Les Premiers-Sapins
- Location within France Location within Bourgogne-Franche-Comté
- Coordinates: 47°05′51″N 6°20′19″E
- Country: France
- Region: Bourgogne-Franche-Comté
- Department: Doubs
- Arrondissement: Pontarlier
- Canton: Valdahon
- Intercommunality: CC Portes Haut-Doubs

Government
  - Mayor (2020–2026): Pierre-François Bernard
- Area^{1}: 52.03 km^{2} (20.09 sq mi)
- Population (2023): 1,587
  - Density: 30.50/km^{2} (79.00/sq mi)
- Time zone: UTC+01:00 (CET)
  - Summer (DST): UTC+02:00 (CEST)
- INSEE/Postal code: 25424 /25580
- ^{1} French Land Register data, which excludes lakes, ponds, glaciers > 1 km^{2} (0.386 sq mi or 247 acres) and river estuaries.

Les Premiers-Sapins (French pronunciation: [le pʁəmje sapɛ̃], literally The First Firs) is a commune in the Doubs department in the Bourgogne-Franche-Comté region in eastern France. Nods is the municipal seat.

== History ==
On 1 January 2016, Les Premiers-Sapins was created by the merger of Athose, Chasnans, Hautepierre-le-Châtelet, Nods, Rantechaux and Vanclans.
