= Rantechaux =

- Part of Les Premiers-Sapins
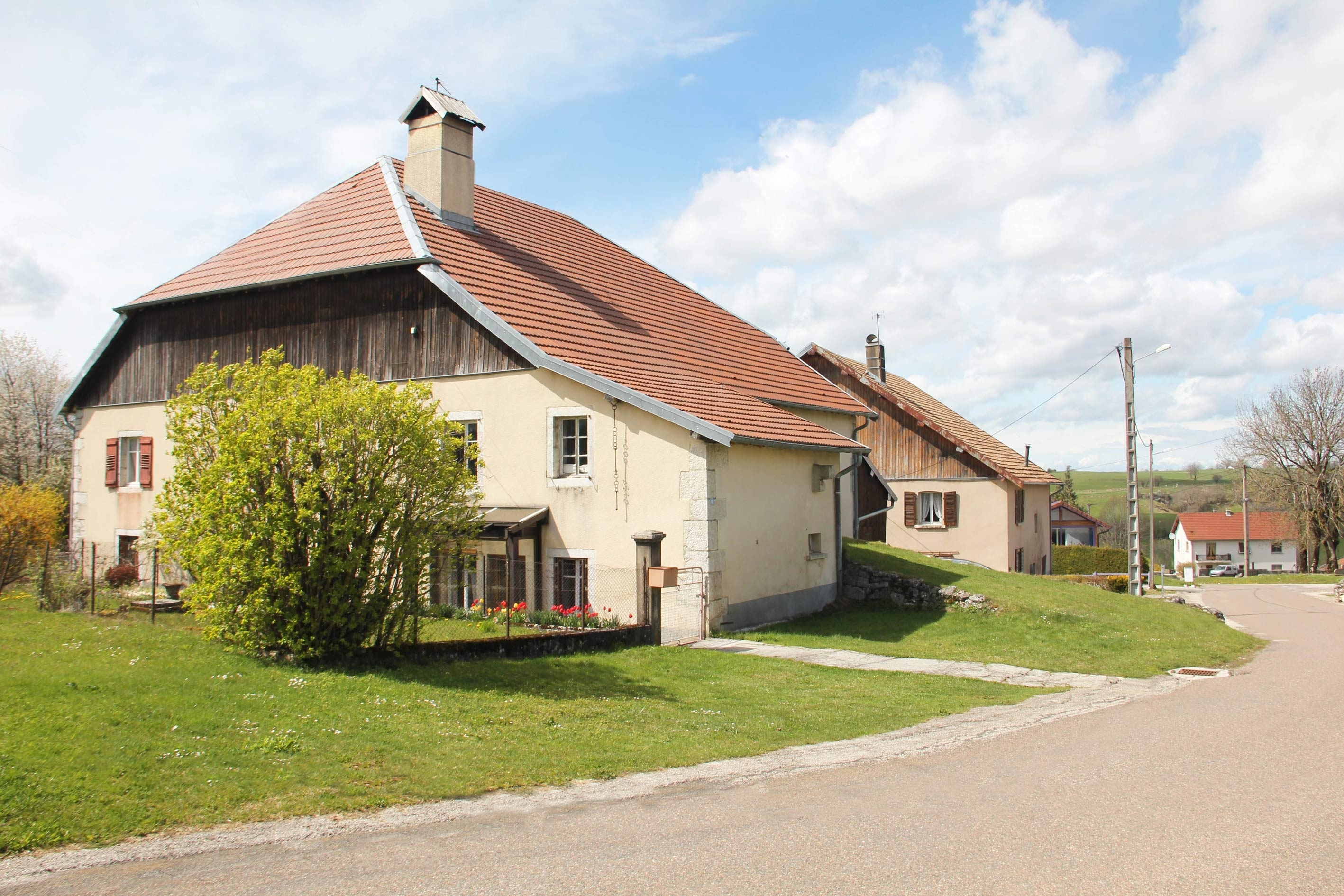
- Farm building in Rantechaux
- Location of Rantechaux
- Location within France Location within Bourgogne-Franche-Comté
- Coordinates: 47°06′46″N 6°22′33″E
- Country: France
- Region: Bourgogne-Franche-Comté
- Department: Doubs
- Arrondissement: Pontarlier
- Canton: Valdahon
- Commune: Les Premiers-Sapins
- Area^{1}: 5.71 km^{2} (2.20 sq mi)
- Elevation: 750 m (2,460 ft)
- Highest elevation: 863 m (2,831 ft)
- Lowest elevation: 718 m (2,356 ft)
- Population (2019): 181
  - Density: 31.7/km^{2} (82.1/sq mi)
- Time zone: UTC+01:00 (CET)
  - Summer (DST): UTC+02:00 (CEST)
- Postal code: 25580
- ^{1} French Land Register data, which excludes lakes, ponds, glaciers > 1 km^{2} (0.386 sq mi or 247 acres) and river estuaries.

Rantechaux (French pronunciation: [ʁɑ̃təʃo]) is a former commune in the Doubs department in the Bourgogne-Franche-Comté region in eastern France.

== History ==
On 1 January 2016, Athose, Chasnans, Hautepierre-le-Châtelet, Nods, Rantechaux and Vanclans merged becoming one commune called Les Premiers-Sapins.

== See also ==
- Communes of the Doubs department
