= Studdal =

Studdal may refer to the following places in Kent, England:

- East Studdal
- West Studdal
