= Chasnans =

- Part of Les Premiers-Sapins
- Location of Chasnans
- Location within France Location within Bourgogne-Franche-Comté
- Coordinates: 47°05′13″N 6°18′51″E
- Country: France
- Region: Bourgogne-Franche-Comté
- Department: Doubs
- Arrondissement: Pontarlier
- Canton: Valdahon
- Commune: Les Premiers-Sapins
- Area^{1}: 7.87 km^{2} (3.04 sq mi)
- Highest elevation: 910 m (2,990 ft)
- Lowest elevation: 648 m (2,126 ft)
- Population (2019): 271
  - Density: 34.4/km^{2} (89.2/sq mi)
- Time zone: UTC+01:00 (CET)
  - Summer (DST): UTC+02:00 (CEST)
- Postal code: 25580
- ^{1} French Land Register data, which excludes lakes, ponds, glaciers > 1 km^{2} (0.386 sq mi or 247 acres) and river estuaries.

Chasnans (French pronunciation: [ʃanɑ̃]) is a former commune in the Doubs department in the Bourgogne-Franche-Comté region in eastern France.

== History ==
On 1 January 2016, Athose, Chasnans, Hautepierre-le-Châtelet, Nods, Rantechaux and Vanclans merged becoming one commune called Les Premiers-Sapins.

== See also ==
- Communes of the Doubs department
