= Nods, Doubs =

Nods
- Part of Les Premiers-Sapins
- Coat of arms
- Location of Nods
- Location within France Location within Bourgogne-Franche-Comté
- Coordinates: 47°05′51″N 6°20′19″E
- Country: France
- Region: Bourgogne-Franche-Comté
- Department: Doubs
- Arrondissement: Pontarlier
- Canton: Valdahon
- Commune: Les Premiers-Sapins
- Area^{1}: 11.78 km^{2} (4.55 sq mi)
- Highest elevation: 950 m (3,120 ft)
- Lowest elevation: 677 m (2,221 ft)
- Population (2019): 567
  - Density: 48.1/km^{2} (125/sq mi)
- Time zone: UTC+01:00 (CET)
  - Summer (DST): UTC+02:00 (CEST)
- Postal code: 25580
- ^{1} French Land Register data, which excludes lakes, ponds, glaciers > 1 km^{2} (0.386 sq mi or 247 acres) and river estuaries.

Nods (French pronunciation: [no]) is a former commune in the Doubs department in the Bourgogne-Franche-Comté region in eastern France. On 1 January 2016, Athose, Chasnans, Hautepierre-le-Châtelet, Nods, Rantechaux and Vanclans merged becoming one commune called Les Premiers-Sapins, of which Nods is the seat. Nods lies 8 km (5.0 mi) from Vercel.

== Population ==
Historical population
Year	Pop.	±% p.a.
1962	396	—
1968	410	+0.58%
1975	381	−1.04%
1982	448	+2.34%
1990	402	−1.35%
1999	411	+0.25%
2006	498	+2.78%
2019	567	+1.00%
Source: EHESS and INSEE

== See also ==
- Communes of the Doubs department
