= Seveux =

Commune in Haute-Saône, France

- Part of Seveux-Motey
- Location of Seveux
- Location within France Location within Bourgogne-Franche-Comté
- Coordinates: 47°33′28″N 5°44′57″E
- Country: France
- Region: Bourgogne-Franche-Comté
- Department: Haute-Saône
- Arrondissement: Vesoul
- Canton: Scey-sur-Saône-et-Saint-Albin
- Commune: Seveux-Motey
- Area^{1}: 16.89 km^{2} (6.52 sq mi)
- Highest elevation: 260 m (850 ft)
- Lowest elevation: 192 m (630 ft)
- Population (2016): 452
  - Density: 26.8/km^{2} (69.3/sq mi)
- Time zone: UTC+01:00 (CET)
  - Summer (DST): UTC+02:00 (CEST)
- Postal code: 70130
- ^{1} French Land Register data, which excludes lakes, ponds, glaciers > 1 km^{2} (0.386 sq mi or 247 acres) and river estuaries.

Seveux (French pronunciation: [səvø]) is a former commune in the Haute-Saône department in the region of Bourgogne-Franche-Comté in eastern France. On 1 January 2019, it was merged into the new commune Seveux-Motey.

It is probably the site of Roman Segobudium.

== See also ==
- Communes of the Haute-Saône department
