= Wingham railway station =

Wingham railway station may refer to:

- Wingham (Canterbury Road) railway station - former station on the East Kent Light Railway
- Wingham Colliery railway station - former station on the East Kent Light Railway
- Wingham railway station, New South Wales - current station on the Australian North Coast line
- Wingham Town railway station - former station on the East Kent Light Railway
