= Richboro Port railway station =

Railway station in Dover, England

Richboro Port

General information
- Location: Richborough, Dover (district); England
- Coordinates: 51.2917°N 1.3454°E
- Grid reference: TR333600
- Platforms: 1

Other information
- Status: Disused

History
- Original company: East Kent Light Railway

Key dates
- c. 1925: Construction
Location

Richboro Port railway station was constructed by the East Kent Light Railway, as part of its branch to Richborough Port, which never opened to passengers. Authorisation to operate a passenger service over the branch was never requested by the East Kent as it considered that the Port had first to develop before expenses could be outlaid on improving the branch's bridges over the Southern Railway and River Stour, which His Majesty's Railway Inspectorate would no doubt have required before giving its consent. The station was named Richboro Port, dropping the "ugh" off the end of Richborough, as witnessed by the nameboard on the station and contemporary maps.

== History ==
In 1911, the East Kent Light Railway obtained a light railway order authorising the construction of a number of lines, among which was "Railway No. 1" from Shepherdswell to Stonar on the River Stour. Covering a total distance of 10 miles 2 furlongs (16 kilometres), Railway No. 1 was intended to provide the collieries being sunk at Guilford and Tilmanstone with the means to bring in construction materials and to allow coal to be shipped out once mining started. A subsequent Railways Order in 1920 authorised "Railway No. 28", a 2.2 furlongs (440 metres) spur from Stonar to Lord Greville's Wharf.

To complete the line, bridges would have to be constructed over the River Stour and the South Eastern and Chatham Railway's Deal to Minster line. An easement for a bridge over the SECR's line was agreed in November 1913 and formal consent was given by its successor, the Southern Railway, in 1924. Progress on the construction of Railway No. 1 beyond Eastry was however slow due to the East Kent's financial difficulties and the military importance of Stonar during the First World War. Preparatory work on the construction of the bridges across the Southern and the Stour began in 1923 and 1924; although the completion date of the bridge is unknown, it was built as a fixed bridge without the opening span that had been stipulated in the original authorisation. The Board of Trade subsequently gave its approval for the bridge. The first record of traffic through to Lord Greville's Wharf occurred in April 1929.

Although a passenger platform was erected at Lord Greville's Wharf (also known as Richborough Port), no passenger trains ever called there nor were authorised to do so. The East Kent may have only considered seeking authorisation if the Port had developed, which would have justified the improvements which would undoubtedly have been required by the Ministry to Transport to be made to the Stour bridge. An intermittent passenger service between Eastry and Sandwich Road had been introduced between 1925 and 1 November 1928, the intention having been to extend the service through to the new platform at Richboro Port if this was seen as having traffic potential. In the event, as only piecemeal development took place at the Port, the East Kent had no real incentive to encourage a passenger service on the branch. The short platform was built of cinders with a wooden sleeper face and a white-painted wooden platform edging. Passenger facilities consisted of a plank seat, nameboard, two lamp posts and a fence running along the back which was made of wooden posts and, allegedly, old locomotive tubes. The station's nameboard indicated that it was called Richboro Port; no tickets are believed to have been printed for it. The station was in a desolate and windswept location and had the distinction of being the only East Kent station not to be situated on Railways No. 1 and No. 2. Certain sources give the intended opening date of the station as c. 1925 but this could be a reference to the date of erection of the platform.

The East Kent's Richborough branch was lifted in 1952, although the tracks over the Stour bridge are known to have been severed at an unknown date during the Second World War. Orders were issued for the bridge's demolition but this was not carried out. It had gone by 1987.

Preceding station	Disused railways	Following station
Sandwich Road; Line never opened to passenger traffic	East Kent Light Railway	Terminus

== Present day ==
No traces of the station remain. The station site is now comprised in the car park of Pfizer Global Research and Development on the west side of the A256 Ramsgate Road.
