= East Kent Railways =

East Kent Railway and similar terms may refer to three railways in Kent, England:

- East Kent Railway (1858–1859, in the Strood area), the predecessor of the London, Chatham and Dover Railway
- East Kent Light Railway (1909–1948, in the Shepherdswell area), one of the Colonel Stephens railways
- East Kent Railway (heritage) (from late 20th century, in the Shepherdswell area), a present-day heritage railway
