= Shepherdswell railway station (EKLR) =

Heritage railway station in England

Shepherdswell
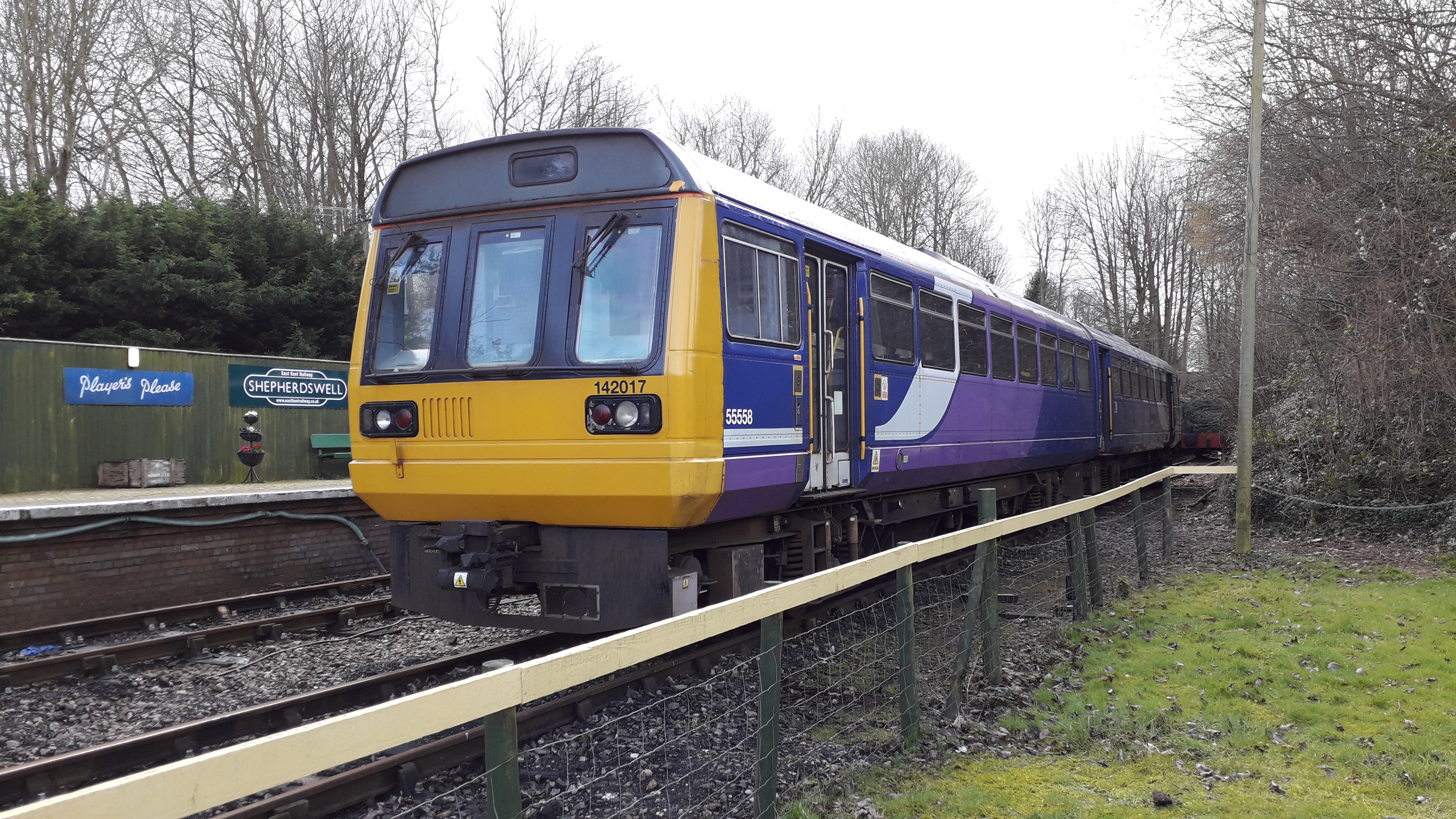
- Now preserved Class 142 Pacer at the station in 2020

General information
- Location: Shepherdswell, Dover (district); England
- Coordinates: 51°11′21″N 1°13′49″E
- Grid reference: TR258482
- System: Station on heritage railway
- Platforms: 1

History
- Original company: East Kent Light Railway
- Post-grouping: East Kent Light Railway; Southern Region of British Railways

Key dates
- 16 October 1916: Opened
- 1 November 1948: Closed
- 1993: Reopened
Location

Shepherdswell railway station is a station on the East Kent Railway. The southern terminus of the East Kent Light Railway, It opened on 16 October 1916 and closed to passenger traffic after the last train on 30 October 1948. Shepherdswell was the location of the engine shed and works, and many sidings. It served the village of Shepherdswell or Sibertswold.

The station reopened as part of the East Kent Railway in 1993. It is about 300 metres (980 ft) from the mainline station Shepherds Well.

Preceding station	Heritage railways	Following station
Terminus	East Kent Railway	Eythorne Terminus
National Rail
Change for Shepherds Well on the Chatham Main Line
Disused railways
Terminus	16 October 1916 to 31 December 1947; East Kent Light Railway	Eythorne
Terminus	1 January 1948 to 30 October 1948; BR Southern Region	Eythorne
