= Shepherds Well =

Shepherds Well may refer to:

- Shepherdswell, a village in Kent, England
- Shepherds Well railway station, the railway station serving Shepherdswell, Kent, England
