= Kearsney =

Kearsney is:

- Kearsney, Kent, a village in the United Kingdom
- Kearsney railway station in Kearsney, Kent
- Kearsney College, a private boarding school for boys in South Africa
