= Ash Town railway station =

Disused railway station in Ash, Dover

Coordinates: 51°16′34″N 1°16′34″E

Ash Town
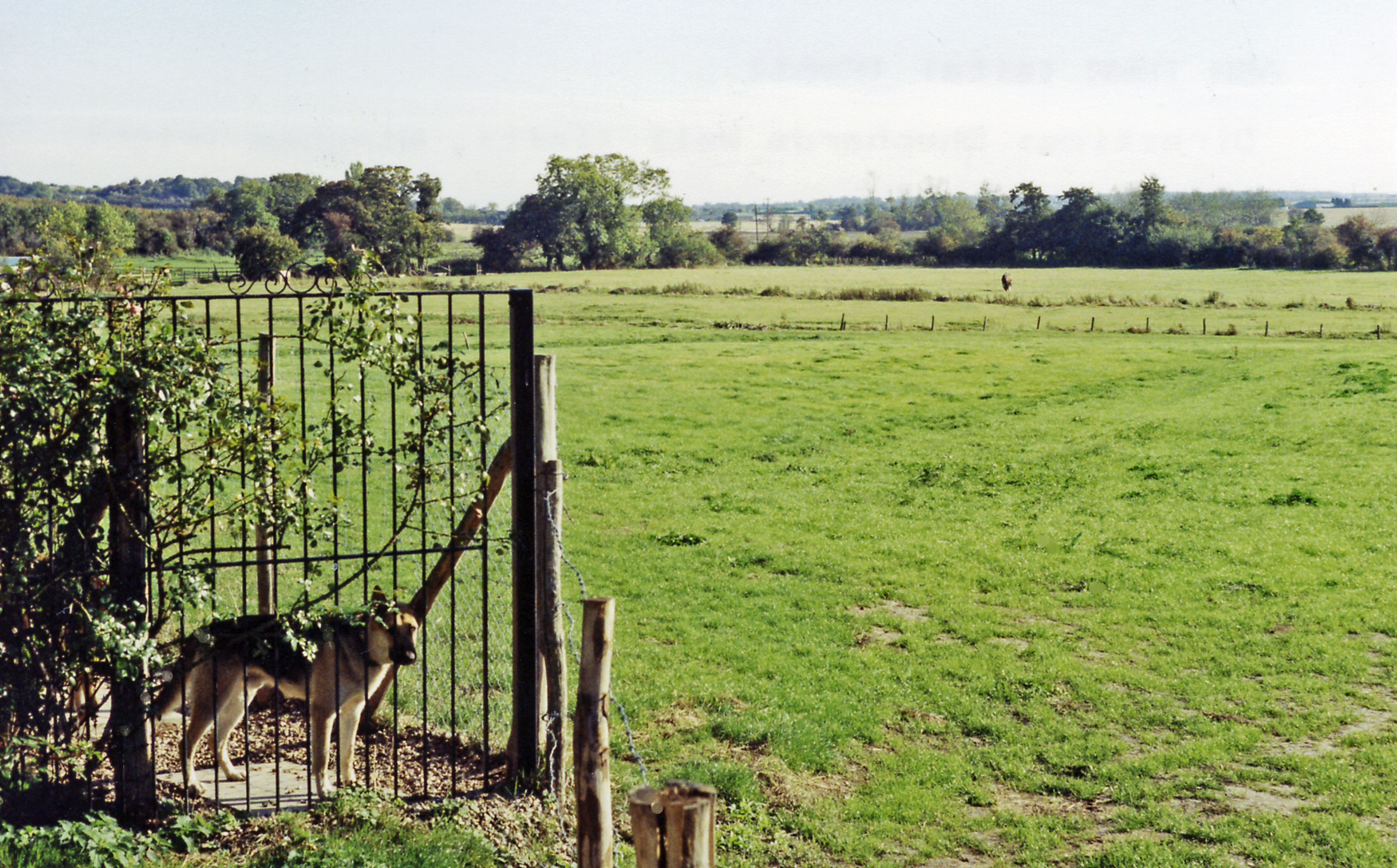
- Site of the station in 1990

General information
- Location: Ash, Dover (district); England
- Grid reference: TR286581
- Platforms: 1

Other information
- Status: Disused

History
- Original company: East Kent Light Railway
- Post-grouping: East Kent Light Railway; Southern Region of British Railways

Key dates
- 16 October 1916: Opened
- 1 November 1948: Closed
- 1 March 1951: closed completely
Location

Ash Town railway station was a railway station on the East Kent Light Railway. The station served the village of Ash.

== History ==
Opened by the East Kent Light Railway on 16 October 1916, it attracted fleeting interest from the Southern Railway. However this faded and the railway stayed independent until being absorbed into the Southern Region of British Railways on nationalisation in 1948. It closed to passenger traffic after the last train on 30 October that year. The track was removed in May 1954. Today there is no trace of the station or the railway as the site is now landscaped into a field.

Preceding station	Disused railways	Following station
Woodnesborough	16 October 1916 to 31 December 1947; East Kent Light Railway	Staple
Woodnesborough	1 January 1948 to 30 October 1948; BR(S)	Staple

== Sources ==
- Vic Mitchell, Keith Smith (1989). The East Kent Light Railway. Midhurst, Sussex, UK: Middleton Press. ISBN 0-906520-61-4.
