= Woodnesborough railway station =

Former railway station in England

Coordinates: 51°15′36″N 1°17′32″E

Woodnesborough

General information
- Location: Woodnesborough, Dover (district); England
- Grid reference: TR298564
- Platforms: 1

Other information
- Status: Disused

History
- Original company: East Kent Light Railway
- Post-grouping: East Kent Light Railway; Southern Region of British Railways

Key dates
- 16 October 1916: Opened
- 1 November 1948: Closed for passengers
- 1 March 1951: closed completely
Location

Woodnesborough railway station was a railway station on the East Kent Light Railway. It opened on 16 October 1916 and closed to passenger traffic after the last train on 30 October 1948. The station served the village of Woodnesborough. There was a 500-gallon water tank and a siding. A half mile long branch served Hammill Brick Works, built on the site of the aborted Hammill Colliery. Today the station site is now covered by industrial buildings.

Preceding station	Disused railways	Following station
Eastry	16 October 1916 to 31 December 1947; East Kent Light Railway	Ash Town
Eastry	1 January 1948 to 30 October 1948; Southern Region	Ash Town

== Sources ==
- Vic Mitchell, Keith Smith (1989). The East Kent Light Railway. Midhurst, Sussex, UK: Middleton Press. ISBN 0-906520-61-4.
