= Tilmanstone Colliery Halt railway station =

Disused railway station in Kent, England

Coordinates: 51.2081°N 1.2682°E

Tilmanstone Colliery Halt
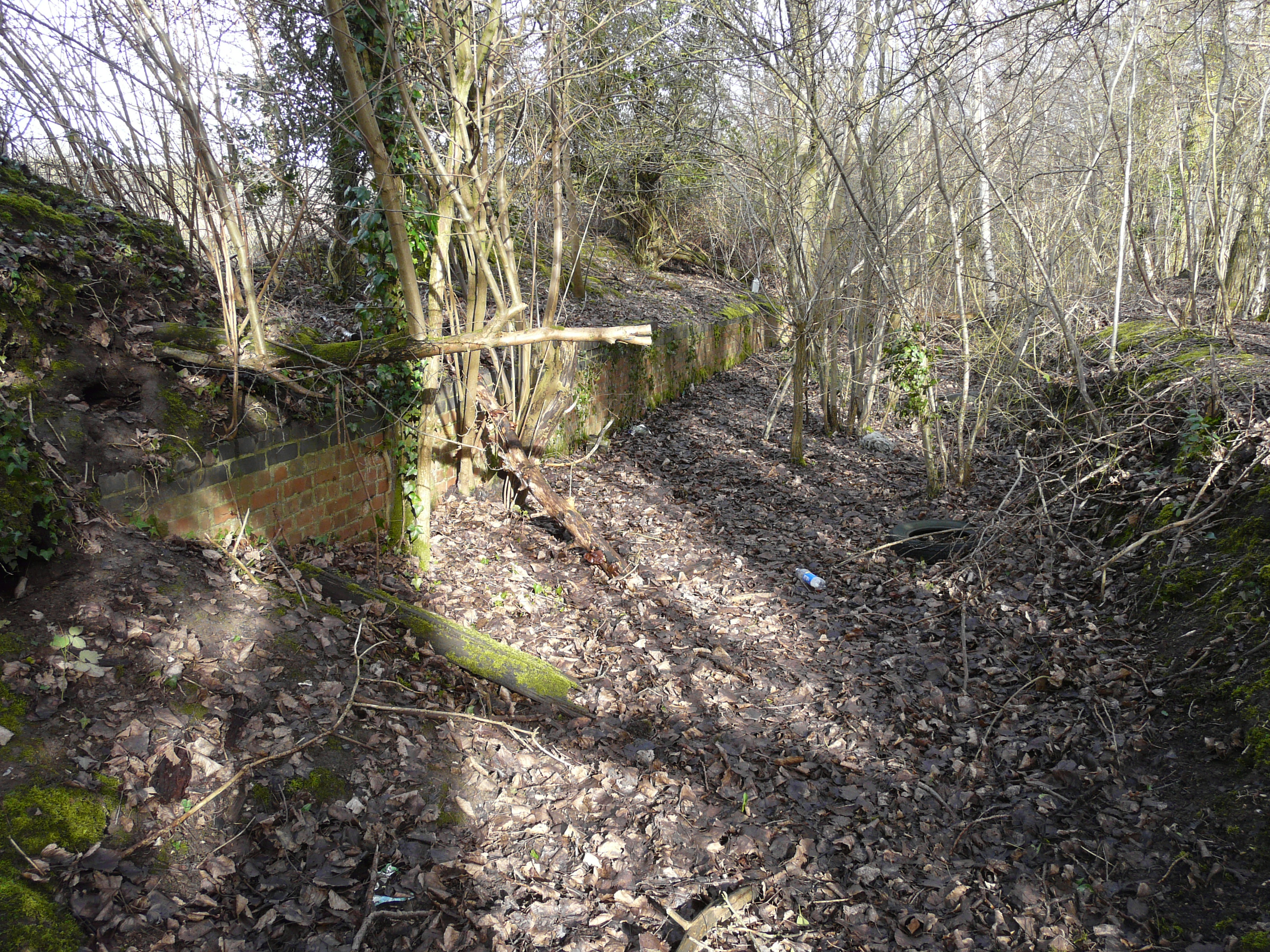
- Elvington station site

General information
- Location: Tilmanstone, Dover (district); England
- Grid reference: TR285505
- Platforms: 1

Other information
- Status: Disused

History
- Original company: East Kent Light Railway
- Post-grouping: East Kent Light Railway; Southern Region of British Railways

Key dates
- 16 October 1916: Opened
- 1925: renamed Elvington
- 1 November 1948: Closed
Location

Tilmanstone Colliery Halt was a station on the East Kent Light Railway. It opened on 16 October 1916 and was renamed Elvington in 1925. It closed to passenger traffic after the last train on 30 October 1948. The station served the pit village of Elvington. Part of the platform is still in situ hidden in undergrowth.

Preceding station	Disused railways	Following station
Eythorne	16 October 1916 to 31 December 1947; East Kent Light Railway	Knowlton
Eythorne	1 January 1948 to 30 October 1948; Southern Region	Knowlton

== Sources ==
- Vic Mitchell, Keith Smith (1989). The East Kent Light Railway. Midhurst, Sussex, UK: Middleton Press. ISBN 0-906520-61-4.
