= Listed buildings in Staple, Kent =

Civil Parish in Kent, England

Staple is a village and civil parish in the Dover District of Kent, England. It contains 30 listed buildings that are recorded in the National Heritage List for England. Of these one is grade I, one is grade II* and 28 are grade II.

This list is based on the information retrieved online from Historic England.

== Key ==
| Grade | Criteria |
|---|---|
| I | Buildings that are of exceptional interest |
| II* | Particularly important buildings of more than special interest |
| II | Buildings that are of special interest |

== Listing ==
| Name | Grade | Location | Type | Completed (Note: The date given is the date used by Historic England as significant for the initial building or that of an important part in the structure's description.) | Date designated | Grid ref. (Note: The grid reference is based on the British national grid reference system, sometimes known as OSGB36, used by the Ordnance Survey.) Geo-coordinates | Notes | Entry number (Note: The "List Entry Number" is a unique number assigned to each listed building and scheduled monument by Historic England.) | Image | Wikidata |
|---|---|---|---|---|---|---|---|---|---|---|
| Barnswell Cottage | II | Barnsole Road | | | 26 November 1987 | TR2787656421; 51°15′41″N 1°15′53″E | | 1363304 | Upload Photo | Q26645137 |
| Gander Court Farmhouse | II | Barnsole Road | | | 11 October 1963 | TR2791656418; 51°15′41″N 1°15′55″E | | 1354751 | Upload Photo | Q26637591 |
| The Black Pig Inn | II | Barnsole Road | | | 11 October 1963 | TR2785156372; 51°15′39″N 1°15′52″E | | 1025843 | Upload Photo | Q26276775 |
| Reed Cottage | II | Buckland Lane | | | 26 November 1987 | TR2728356507; 51°15′45″N 1°15′23″E | | 1070170 | Upload Photo | Q26323801 |
| Barn About 50 Metres North East of Crixhall Court | II | Crixhall | | | 26 November 1987 | TR2677055793; 51°15′22″N 1°14′55″E | | 1363305 | Upload Photo | Q26645138 |
| Crixhall Court | II* | Crixhall | | | 13 October 1952 | TR2669555758; 51°15′21″N 1°14′51″E | | 1354754 | Upload Photo | Q17557880 |
| Staple Farmhouse | II | Durlock Road | | | 26 November 1987 | TR2727956796; 51°15′54″N 1°15′23″E | | 1363306 | Upload Photo | Q26645139 |
| Thatch Cottage | II | Durlock Road | | | 26 November 1987 | TR2727556777; 51°15′53″N 1°15′23″E | | 1281805 | Upload Photo | Q26570819 |
| Flemings House | II | Fleming Road | | | 26 November 1987 | TR2842956719; 51°15′50″N 1°16′22″E | | 1070132 | Upload Photo | Q26323729 |
| Rose Cottage | II | Fleming Road | | | 26 November 1987 | TR2798456683; 51°15′49″N 1°15′59″E | | 1070131 | Upload Photo | Q26323727 |
| The Groves | II | 1-3, Grove Road | | | 11 October 1963 | TR2687457161; 51°16′06″N 1°15′03″E | | 1363323 | Upload Photo | Q26645155 |
| Icehouse About 25 Metres South West of the Grove | II | Grove Road | | | 26 November 1987 | TR2682357142; 51°16′06″N 1°15′01″E | | 1070134 | Upload Photo | Q26323733 |
| The Dovecote | II | Grove Road | | | 26 November 1987 | TR2676457216; 51°16′08″N 1°14′58″E | | 1363324 | Upload Photo | Q26645156 |
| Walled Gardens and Stables Adjacent to and West of Nos 1-3 the Groves | II | Grove Road | | | 26 November 1987 | TR2681157187; 51°16′07″N 1°15′00″E | | 1070133 | Upload Photo | Q26323731 |
| Great Pedding | II | Pedding Lane | | | 11 October 1987 | TR2687657952; 51°16′32″N 1°15′05″E | | 1070135 | Upload Photo | Q26323735 |
| School House | II | School Lane | | | 26 November 1987 | TR2719056647; 51°15′49″N 1°15′18″E | | 1070171 | Upload Photo | Q26323803 |
| Barn About 30 Metres North of Shatterling Farmhouse | II | Shatterling | | | 26 November 1987 | TR2582158667; 51°16′56″N 1°14′12″E | | 1070136 | Upload Photo | Q26323737 |
| Beaute Farmhouse | II | Shatterling | | | 11 October 1963 | TR2603658019; 51°16′35″N 1°14′22″E | | 1363326 | Upload Photo | Q26645158 |
| Shatterling Farmhouse | II | Shatterling | | | 26 November 1987 | TR2581058619; 51°16′55″N 1°14′12″E | | 1363325 | Upload Photo | Q26645157 |
| Cottage About 20 Metres North of Summerfield Farmhouse | II | Summerfield | | | 26 November 1987 | TR2773256042; 51°15′29″N 1°15′45″E | | 1203311 | Upload Photo | Q26498858 |
| Summerfield Farmhouse | II | Summerfield | | | 11 October 1963 | TR2773256004; 51°15′28″N 1°15′45″E | | 1070140 | Upload Photo | Q26323743 |
| Well Housing and Gear About 3 Metres South of Summerfield Farmhouse | II | Summerfield | | | 26 November 1987 | TR2773355995; 51°15′27″N 1°15′45″E | | 1203299 | Upload Photo | Q26498847 |
| Chest Tomb to Laurence Omer, About 10 Metres North East of Church of St James | II | The Street | | | 26 November 1987 | TR2695656655; 51°15′50″N 1°15′06″E | | 1203288 | Upload Photo | Q26498837 |
| Church of St James | I | The Street | church building | | 11 October 1963 | TR2693656641; 51°15′49″N 1°15′05″E | | 1070137 | Church of St James More images | Q17529716 |
| Group of 3 Chest Tombs and Headstone About 5-10 Metres South of Church of St James | II | The Street | | | 26 November 1987 | TR2693956627; 51°15′49″N 1°15′05″E | | 1363327 | Upload Photo | Q26645159 |
| Group of 5 Headstones 1 to 5 Metres North of South Porch of Church of St James | II | The Street | | | 26 November 1987 | TR2693456632; 51°15′49″N 1°15′05″E | | 1070138 | Upload Photo | Q26323739 |
| Lychgate About 10 Metres South of Church of St James | II | The Street | | | 11 October 1963 | TR2693256621; 51°15′49″N 1°15′05″E | | 1070139 | Upload Photo | Q26323741 |
| Row of 4 Headstones 1 to 5 Metres South West of Church of St James | II | The Street | | | 26 November 1987 | TR2691856629; 51°15′49″N 1°15′04″E | | 1203279 | Upload Photo | Q26498830 |
| The Three Tuns | II | The Street | | | 13 July 1979 | TR2673756692; 51°15′51″N 1°14′55″E | | 1281785 | Upload Photo | Q26570800 |
| White Gate | II | The Street | | | 26 November 1987 | TR2694856599; 51°15′48″N 1°15′06″E | | 1281761 | Upload Photo | Q26570776 |

== See also ==
- Grade I listed buildings in Kent
- Grade II* listed buildings in Kent

== Sources ==
- Newman, John (2013) [1969], Kent: North-East and East, The Buildings of England, New Haven and London: Yale University Press, ISBN 978-0-300-18506-5
