= Crabble Athletic Ground =

Football stadium in River, Kent, England

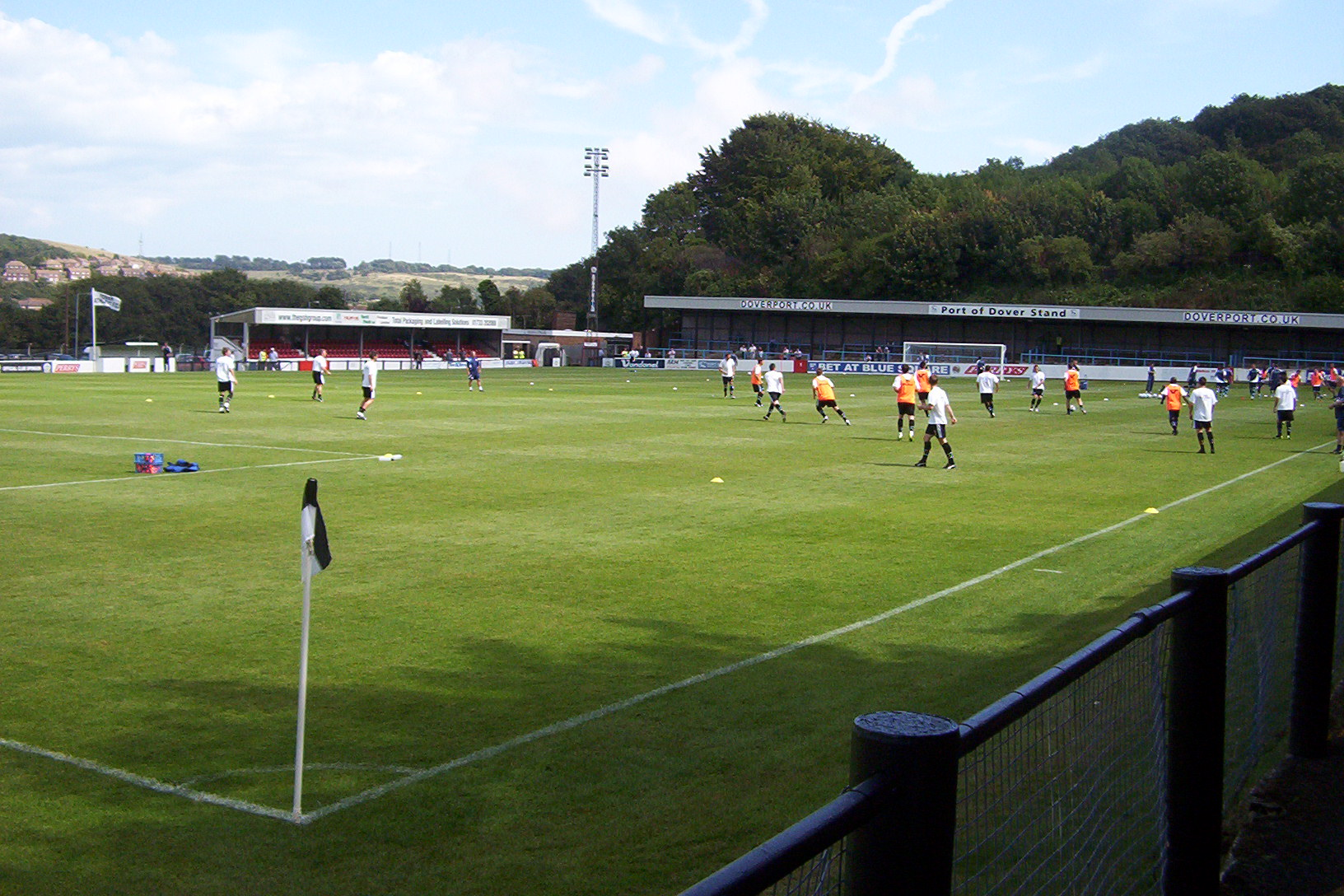
- The view towards the Town End in 2009
- Interactive map of Crabble Athletic Ground
- Full name: Crabble Athletic Ground
- Location: River, Kent
- Coordinates: 51.138°N 1.285°E
- Owner: Dover District Council
- Operator: Dover Athletic F.C.
- Capacity: 6,500 (2,010 seats)
- Surface: Grass
- Field size: Unknown

Construction
- Built: 1931 (upper ground)
- Opened: 1897

Tenants
- Dover United F.C. (1931–1933); Dover F.C. (1934–1947); Dover F.C. (1947–1983); Dover Athletic F.C. (1983–present); Margate F.C. (2002–2004)

The Crabble Athletic Ground, also known as simply Crabble, or The Crabble is a football stadium located in the northern Dover suburb of River, Kent. It was the home of the various incarnations of Dover F.C. from 1931 until the club folded in 1983. Since then it has been the home of Dover Athletic F.C., and it was also the temporary home of Margate F.C. between 2002 and 2004, when the club's Hartsdown Park stadium was being redeveloped. The stadium has two seated stands and two covered terraces and holds a total of 6,500 fans (including 2,010 seats and 4,490 covered terracing), although in the past, crowds larger than that figure could be accommodated. It also has a clubhouse, which the club completely redeveloped in 2008.

A sports ground was first established on the site at the end of the 19th century and was used for both cricket and football as well as for other sports. This ground was used by Kent County Cricket Club for over 100 first-class cricket matches between 1907 and 1976 and is now the home of Dover Rugby Union Club.

== History ==
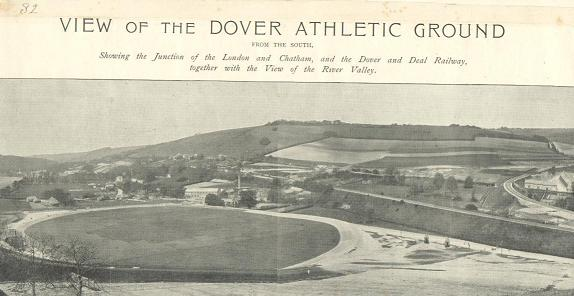
The Crabble Meadows area shortly after the Athletic Ground was laid out in 1897

In 1896, a syndicate of local businessmen began a project to create a sports complex at the site known as Crabble Meadows on the outskirts of Dover. The word Crabble, which is also found in the name of a local corn mill, derives from the Old English crabba hol, meaning a hole in which crabs are found. The project was an extremely costly one but was completed in 1897, and football was first played on the Crabble site in the same year. The ground was originally laid out on an 8 acres (3.2 ha) plateau "carved out of the side of the hill" and was originally laid out to cater for cricket and football, with an athletics track and 640 yards (590 m) international standard cycling track around the edge of the playing surfaces.

In 1902, the original owners of the site, beset by financial problems, contemplated selling the land for redevelopment but eventually sold the site to the town council for £5,500. The pitch was shared by the town's cricket and football teams, with the cricketers being given priority, which meant that the football team was forced to begin and end its season either with a long run of consecutive away matches or by playing matches at other, less satisfactory, venues in the town. To resolve the issue, the council opted to lay out a new football pitch further up the hillside, behind the lower pitch's pavilion. The first match played on the "upper pitch" took place in September 1931, with a small stand being constructed the following year. The football club then used the upper pitch whenever the lower pitch was unavailable due to cricket commitments.

Dover F.C. applied for permission to build a grandstand on the southern side of the "upper pitch" in 1947, but the application was rejected. Three years later, the club was permitted to extend the existing small stand on the opposite side and in 1951, Dover F.C. moved to the upper pitch on a permanent basis, initially paying the council rent of £300 a year. The final match on the lower pitch took place on 26 March 1951, and the first on the upper pitch was held eleven days later, when Fulham were Dover's opponents in a friendly. Due to a shortage of bolts, the grandstand had not actually been completed at this time. Covered terracing at the Town End, where fans had previously stood on the hillside, was added soon afterwards. Floodlights were added in 1961 and inaugurated with a match against a Chelsea XI.

Dover F.C folded in 1983, but the newly formed Dover Athletic took over the ground and continued to make improvements. When the team won the Southern League championship in 1990, however, promotion to the Football Conference was refused on the grounds that the stadium did not meet the standard required by the higher division. Subsequently, new turnstiles were installed and two new terraces were built behind the goals. The seating in the main stand was replaced and a second grandstand was added on the opposite side of the pitch. These improvements meant that the club was able to gain promotion after its second Southern League title in 1993. In the 2002–03 and 2003–04 seasons, Margate F.C. played home fixtures at the stadium while redevelopment work took place at their own Hartsdown Park ground. What was originally intended to be a short-term arrangement ended up lasting for two years as the redevelopment work stalled.

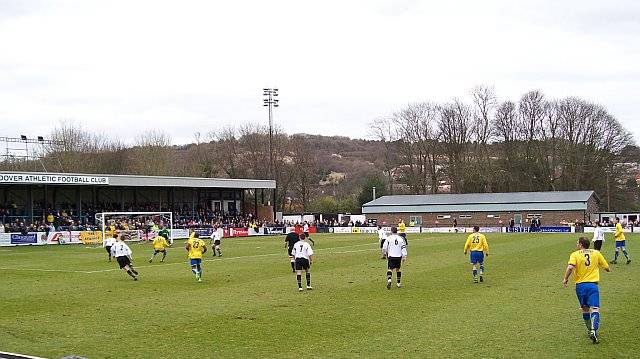
The view towards the River End and re-built clubhouse in 2009

Between 2003 and 2004, the ground was known as the Hoverspeed Stadium under the terms of a sponsorship deal. In 2007, the club announced that under another such arrangement, the stadium would be known as the SeaFrance Crabble Stadium, however a year later it was announced that the deal would not be renewed due to the ferry operator's financial constraints. On 1 July 2008, the club announced local car dealership Perry's as the club's new main sponsor, with the stadium being rebranded as the Perry's Crabble Stadium. In 2008 the club launched a project to replace the existing clubhouse with a new £200,000 building featuring a larger bar, better audio-visual facilities and a high quality kitchen. The club hopes the new building will become a popular venue for social and business functions.

== Structure and facilities ==
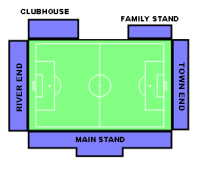
A plan of the ground

The stadium is known for its unusual location, being set into the side of a hill. It has two seated stands and two covered terraces. The Main Stand, which has been in place since 1951, occupies the length of one side of the pitch and has a roof supported by numerous columns, which obscure the view for some fans. Identical covered terraces for standing spectators are behind both goals, which also suffer from an obstructed view. The small Family Stand occupies a portion of the side opposite the Main Stand. The remainder of this side of the ground is taken up by the clubhouse, toilets and other club facilities. Unlike most football stadiums, the club directors' lounge is set atop one of the stands. In December 2009 the Football Association gave the stadium's facilities an A grade, meaning that it meets the minimum standard for entry to the Football League.

The stadium is approximately 1.5 miles (2 km) from Kearsney railway station, which lies on Southeastern's Chatham Main Line from London Victoria to Dover Priory. Dover Priory itself is further away, but connecting bus services are available. Parking is available around the perimeter of the adjacent rugby club.

== Records ==
The highest attendance ever recorded at the ground was recorded when "just under 7,000" fans were in attendance for a match between Dover F.C. and Folkestone on 13 October 1951. Current club Dover Athletic's record home attendance is the crowd of 5,645 for the match against Crystal Palace in the FA Cup on 4 January 2015.

== Cricket history ==
Crabble Athletic Ground
- Interactive map of Crabble Athletic Ground

Ground information
- Location: River, Kent
- Country: England
- Coordinates: 51.139°N 1.287°E
- Home club: Dover RFC
- Establishment: 1897
- Owner: Dover District Council
- Last used: 2002

Team information
| Dover Cricket Club | (1897–2002) |
| Kent County Cricket Club | (1907–1976) |
- As of 21 March 2018; Source: CricInfo

The lower pitch at The Crabble was originally intended primarily for cricket. It was used by Dover Cricket Club and football matches had to be scheduled around cricket fixtures until Dover F.C. moved to the upper ground in the 1930s. The ground hosted MCC in 1899 and the first cricket festival was held on the ground in 1900. In 1907 the ground was first used by Kent County Cricket Club as one of its home venues for first-class cricket, a move The Times classed as "something of an experiment". The experiment, with Gloucestershire providing the opposition, was successful and from 1908 the ground was given a cricket week by the county club, with two first-class matches played in almost every season until the end of the 1960s.

After a series of matches during the 1960s where the pitch was considered not at first-class standard, only one match was held at the ground in 1968 after an MCC inspector passed the ground fit. After a full festival programme in 1969, Kent gradually began to move away from the ground. The final first-class match on the ground was played against Derbyshire in July 1976.

Kent played a total of 106 first-class matches on the ground as well as using it for four List A cricket matches between 1970 and 1975 and for occasional Second XI matches in the 1970s and 1980s. Kent Women played matches against New Zealand in 1984 and Australia in 1987 on the ground and it was used by the England women's cricket team for a warm-up match ahed of the 1993 Women's World Cup. After Kent played the final match on the ground in 1976, it continued to be used by Dover Cricket Club until the club was forced to close down in 2004 with debts of over £10,000.

=== Records on the ground ===
A total of 106 first-class matches were held on the ground, all with Kent as the home team.

- Highest total: 560 by Kent against Derbyshire, 1935
- Lowest total: 43 by Kent against Middlesex, 1957
- Highest partnership: 280, 3rd wicket by J Seymour and FE Woolley for Kent against Lancashire, 1922
- Highest individual score: 305 not out, WH Ashdown for Kent against Derbyshire, 1935
- Best bowling in an innings: 10/65, GC Collins for Kent against Nottinghamshire, 1922
- Best bowling in a match: 16/83, GC Collins for Kent against Nottinghamshire, 1922

Bill Ashdown's individual score of 305 not out was his second triple-century and followed his score of 332 the previous season against Essex at Brentwood. It remained Kent's second highest individual score and the highest score made by a Kent batsman on a home ground until 2017 when Sean Dickson scored 318 runs at Beckenham. George Collins' bowling figures of 10/65 in an innings in 1922 was the third time a Kent bowler had taken all 10 wickets in an innings. As of March 2018, they are the third best innings bowling figures in the county's history.

Four List A fixtures were also played by Kent on the ground between 1970 and 1975, all in the Sunday League. Hylton Ackerman made the only century scored in List A cricket on the ground, scoring 115 not out for Northants in 1970. The highest team score on the ground was made during the same match, Kent scoring 240 runs to win the 40 over match.

== Other uses ==
The lower ground was originally laid out as a sports ground with the capacity to play football, cricket, hockey and lawn tennis. It was surrounded by an athletics track and a cycling track and the ground was used regularly for both sports – its opening event was a cycling meeting organised by Dover Cycling Club. The cycling track remains, and the ground and original cricket pavilion are used by Dover RFC for rugby union matches.
