= Roman Road railway station (Kent) =

Railway station in England

Coordinates: 51°16′04″N 1°19′16″E

Roman Road

General information
- Location: Woodnesborough, Dover (district); England
- Grid reference: TR317573
- Platforms: 1

Other information
- Status: Disused

History
- Original company: East Kent Light Railway
- Post-grouping: East Kent Light Railway; Southern Region of British Railways

Key dates
- May 1925: Opened
- 1 November 1928: Closed
- 1 January 1950: Closed for freight traffic
Location

Roman Road railway station was a railway station on the East Kent Light Railway. It opened in May 1925 and closed to passenger traffic on 1 November 1928. Today there is no trace of the station.

Preceding station	Disused railways	Following station
Poison Cross	East Kent Light Railway	Sandwich Road

== Sources ==
- Vic Mitchell, Keith Smith (1989). The East Kent Light Railway. Midhurst, Sussex, UK: Middleton Press. ISBN 0-906520-61-4.
