= Knowlton railway station =

Former railway station in England

Coordinates: 51°13′26″N 1°16′33″E

Knowlton Halt

General information
- Location: Knowlton, Dover (district); England
- Grid reference: TR288523
- Platforms: 1

Other information
- Status: Disused

History
- Original company: East Kent Light Railway
- Post-grouping: East Kent Light Railway; Southern Region of British Railways

Key dates
- 16 October 1916: Opened
- 1 November 1948: Closed for passengers
- 31 October 1949: closed completely
Location

Knowlton was a halt on the East Kent Light Railway. It opened on 16 October 1916 as Tilmanstone Village but was renamed the following year. It closed to passenger traffic after the last train on 30 October 1948. After closure the platform was demolished and the area landscaped into a field. As at December 2011 the shallow cutting along which the railway ran at this site is still visible.

Preceding station	Disused railways	Following station
Tilmanstone Colliery Halt	16 October 1916 to 1925; East Kent Light Railway	Eastry
Elvington	12 April 1925 to 31 December 1947; East Kent Light Railway	Eastry South
Elvington	1 January 1948 to 30 October 1948; Southern Region	Eastry South
