= Eastry South railway station =

Former railway station in England

Coordinates: 51°14′32″N 1°17′43″E

Eastry South

General information
- Location: Eastry, Dover (district); England
- Grid reference: TR301544
- Platforms: 1

Other information
- Status: Disused

History
- Original company: East Kent Light Railway
- Post-grouping: East Kent Light Railway; Southern Region of British Railways

Key dates
- 13 April 1925: Opened
- 1 November 1948: Closed for passengers
- 1 March 1951: closed completely
Location

Eastry South railway station was a railway station on the East Kent Light Railway. It opened on 13 April 1925 and closed to passenger traffic after the last train on 30 October 1948. The station served the village of Eastry. There was a siding to the south of the station. The track was removed in May 1954.

Preceding station	Disused railways	Following station
Knowlton	East Kent Light Railway	Eastry
Knowlton	BR Southern Region	Eastry

== Sources ==
- Vic Mitchell, Keith Smith (1989). The East Kent Light Railway. Midhurst, Sussex, UK: Middleton Press. ISBN 0-906520-61-4.
