= Poison Cross railway station =

Former railway station in England

Coordinates: 51°15′13″N 1°18′27″E

Poison Cross

General information
- Location: Eastry, Dover (district); England
- Grid reference: TR309557
- Platforms: 1

Other information
- Status: Disused

History
- Original company: East Kent Light Railway
- Post-grouping: East Kent Light Railway; Southern Region of British Railways

Key dates
- May 1925: Opened
- 1 November 1928: Closed for passengers
- 1 January 1950: Closed for freight traffic
Location

Poison Cross railway station was a railway station on the East Kent Light Railway. It opened in May 1925 and closed to passenger traffic on 1 November 1928. There was a passing loop and a siding.

Preceding station	Disused railways	Following station
Eastry	East Kent Light Railway	Roman Road

== Sources ==
- Vic Mitchell, Keith Smith (1989). The East Kent Light Railway. Midhurst, Sussex, UK: Middleton Press. ISBN 0-906520-61-4.
