= Listed buildings in River =

Historic structures in Kent, England

River is a village and civil parish in the Dover District of Kent, England. It contains 17 listed buildings that are recorded in the National Heritage List for England. Of these one grade II* and 16 are grade II.

This list is based on the information retrieved online from Historic England.

== Key ==
Grade	Criteria
I	Buildings that are of exceptional interest
II*	Particularly important buildings of more than special interest
II	Buildings that are of special interest

== Listing ==
Name	Grade	Location	Type	Completed (Note: The date given is the date used by Historic England as significant for the initial building or that of an important part in the structure's description.)	Date designated	Grid ref. (Note: The grid reference is based on the British national grid reference system, sometimes known as OSGB36, used by the Ordnance Survey.) Geo-coordinates	Notes	Entry number (Note: The "List Entry Number" is a unique number assigned to each listed building and scheduled monument by Historic England.)	Image	Wikidata
Bushy Ruff Cottages	II	1-6, Alkham Road			17 December 1973	TR2854643696; 51°08′49″N 1°15′59″E		1069519	Upload Photo	Q26322586
Weeford	II	3, Common Lane, Crabble			30 June 1949	TR2932443446; 51°08′40″N 1°16′38″E		1069530	Upload Photo	Q26322602
Ivy Cottage	II	12, Common Lane, Crabble			17 December 1973	TR2927843418; 51°08′39″N 1°16′36″E		1069531	Upload Photo	Q26322604
Arch Across River	II	Kearsney Abbey Grounds, Kearsney Abbey			17 December 1973	TR2890843687; 51°08′48″N 1°16′17″E		1139449	Upload Photo	Q26432321
Bridge in the Grounds of Kearsney Abbey	II	Kearsney Abbey Grounds, Kearnsey Abbey			17 December 1973	TR2882543698; 51°08′48″N 1°16′13″E		1069502	Upload Photo	Q26322554
Kearsney Abbey	II	Kearsney Abbey Grounds, Kearsney Abbey			17 December 1973	TR2874043798; 51°08′52″N 1°16′09″E		1139005	Upload Photo	Q26431966
Part of Wall and Gatepiers to Kearsney Abbey	II	Kearsney Abbey Grounds			17 December 1973	TR2868043787; 51°08′51″N 1°16′06″E		1343824	Upload Photo	Q26627593
Ruin in Grounds of Kearsney Abbey	II	Kearsney Abbey Grounds, Kearsney Abbey			17 December 1973	TR2865043761; 51°08′51″N 1°16′04″E		1138982	Upload Photo	Q26431948
Wall at the End of the Lake in the Grounds of Kearsney Abbey	II	Kearsney Abbey Grounds, Kearsney Abbey			17 December 1973	TR2891443651; 51°08′47″N 1°16′17″E		1343825	Upload Photo	Q26627594
Crabble Court	II	Lower Road, Crabble			30 June 1949	TR2977543124; 51°08′28″N 1°17′00″E		1363226	Upload Photo	Q26645062
Crabble Mill	II*	Lower Road	watermill		5 June 1972	TR2975343184; 51°08′30″N 1°16′59″E		1070318	Crabble Mill More images	Q17557708
Royal Oak Cottage the Royal Oak Public House	II	Lower Road, Crabble			17 December 1973	TR2949043443; 51°08′39″N 1°16′47″E		1070319	Upload Photo	Q26324092
The Old Vicarage	II	Lower Road, Crabble			30 June 1949	TR2979443106; 51°08′28″N 1°17′01″E		1070317	Upload Photo	Q26324090
Church of St Peter	II	Minnis Lane	church building		17 December 1973	TR2905943480; 51°08′41″N 1°16′24″E		1363230	Church of St Peter More images	Q26645066
River House Including Garage (former Coach House and Tack Room) Coal House and Stabling	II	33, Valley Road			4 August 1986	TR2951243220; 51°08′32″N 1°16′47″E		1070329	Upload Photo	Q26324106
Hofwyl Cottage	II	34, Valley Road			4 August 1986	TR2948843240; 51°08′33″N 1°16′46″E		1258643	Upload Photo	Q26549856
Garden Wall and Gatepiers to 33 and 34	II	Valley Road			4 August 1986	TR2949243249; 51°08′33″N 1°16′46″E		1070330	Upload Photo	Q26324108

== See also ==
- Grade I listed buildings in Kent
- Grade II* listed buildings in Kent

== Sources ==
- Newman, John (2013) [1969], Kent: North-East and East, The Buildings of England, New Haven and London: Yale University Press, ISBN 978-0-300-18506-5
