= Eythorne railway station =

Heritage railway station in England

Coordinates: 51°11′54″N 1°15′49″E

Eythorne
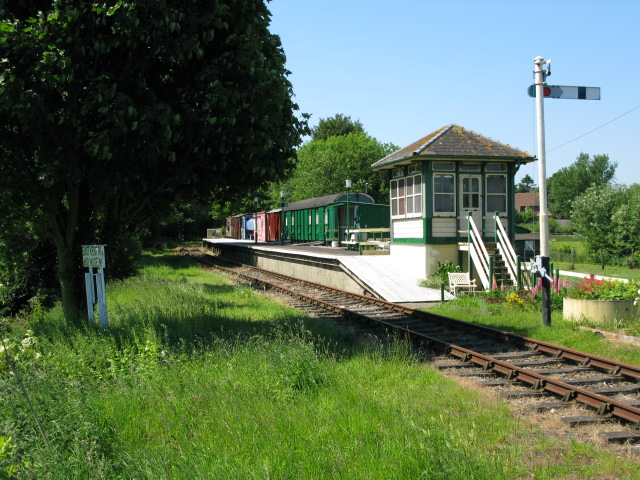
- The station in 2009

General information
- Location: Eythorne, Dover (district); England
- Grid reference: TR281494
- System: Station on heritage railway
- Platforms: 1

History
- Original company: East Kent Light Railway
- Post-grouping: East Kent Light Railway; Southern Region of British Railways

Key dates
- 16 October 1916: Opened
- 1 November 1948: Closed
- 1993: Reopened
Location

Eythorne railway station is a station on the East Kent Railway. Originally a station on the East Kent Light Railway, It opened on 16 October 1916 but closed to passenger traffic after the last train on 30 October 1948. It served as the junction for the branch to Guilford Colliery, which was abandoned in 1921. The track on this branch was lifted in 1931 but relaid during World War II to accommodate a 9.2 inches (230 mm) rail mounted gun. The station served the village of Eythorne, it reopened as part of the East Kent Railway in 1993.

| Preceding station | Heritage railways | Following station |
|---|---|---|
| Shepherdswell Terminus | East Kent Railway | Terminus |
Disused railways
| Shepherdswell (EKLR) | 16 October 1916 to 1925; East Kent Light Railway | Tilmanstone Colliery Halt |
| Shepherdswell (EKLR) | 1925 to 31 December 1947; East Kent Light Railway | Elvington |
| Shepherdswell (EKLR) | 1 January 1948 to 30 October 1948; Southern Region | Elvington |
