= Shepherds Well railway station =

Railway station in Kent, England

Shepherds Well
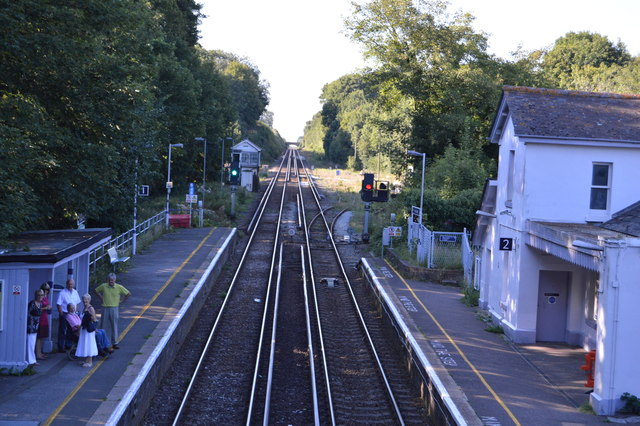

General information
- Location: Shepherdswell, District of Dover; England
- Coordinates: 51.188194°N 1.229722°E
- Grid reference: TR257481
- Manager: Southeastern
- Platforms: 2

Other information
- Station code: SPH
- Classification: DfT category E

History
- Opened: 22 July 1861

Passengers
- 2020/21: ▼16,966
- 2021/22: ▲37,758
- 2022/23: ▲53,410
- 2023/24: ▲65,634
- 2024/25: ▲70,278
Location
Notes
- Passenger statistics from the Office of Rail and Road

Shepherds Well railway station is on the Dover branch of the Chatham Main Line in England, and serves the village of Shepherdswell, Kent. It is 71 miles 60 chains (115.5 km) down the line from London Victoria and is situated between Snowdown and Kearsney.

The station and all trains that serve the station are operated by Southeastern.

It appears in the timetable and online enquiry systems as "Shepherds Well" but the platform signs read "Shepherdswell". It is adjacent to the terminus of the East Kent heritage line, which is spelt as one word: Shepherdswell.

The booking office in the station building on the country-bound platform is open only for very limited hours on Mondays to Fridays mornings but a Permit To Travel ticket machine (also on the country-bound platform) caters for out-of-hours ticketing.

The station and the line it serves were built by the London, Chatham & Dover Railway.

== Services ==
All services at Shepherds Well are operated by Southeastern using Class 375 EMUs.

The typical off-peak service in trains per hour is:

- 1 tph to London Victoria via Chatham
- 1 tph to Dover Priory

Additional services including trains to and from London Bridge and London Cannon Street call at the station in the peak hours.

Preceding station	National Rail	Following station
Snowdown	Southeastern Chatham Main Line - Dover Branch	Kearsney
Heritage railways
Change for East Kent Railway at Shepherdswell
