= Sandwich Road railway station =

Former railway station in England

Coordinates: 51°16′45″N 1°19′16″E

Sandwich Road

General information
- Location: Sandwich, Dover (district); England
- Grid reference: TR317585
- Platforms: 1

Other information
- Status: Disused

History
- Original company: East Kent Light Railway
- Post-grouping: East Kent Light Railway; Southern Region of British Railways

Key dates
- May 1925: Opened
- 1 November 1928: Closed to passengers
- 1 January 1950: Closed completely
Location

Sandwich Road railway station was a railway station on the East Kent Light Railway. It opened in May 1925 and closed to passenger traffic on 1 November 1928. There were plans to extend to Richboro Port railway station but permission to run passenger services north of Sandwich Road was not granted by His Majesty's Railway Inspectorate due to the poor state of repair of the bridge over the Southern Railway and River Stour. The platform was north of the road and a passing loop was south of the road. The station officially closed completely on 1 January 1950 although its use may have ceased earlier.

Preceding station	Disused railways	Following station
Roman Road	East Kent Light Railway	Terminus

== Sources ==
- Vic Mitchell, Keith Smith (1989). The East Kent Light Railway. Midhurst, Sussex, UK: Middleton Press. ISBN 0-906520-61-4.
