= Temple Ewell =

Village in Kent, England

Coordinates: 51.1526°N 1.2695°E

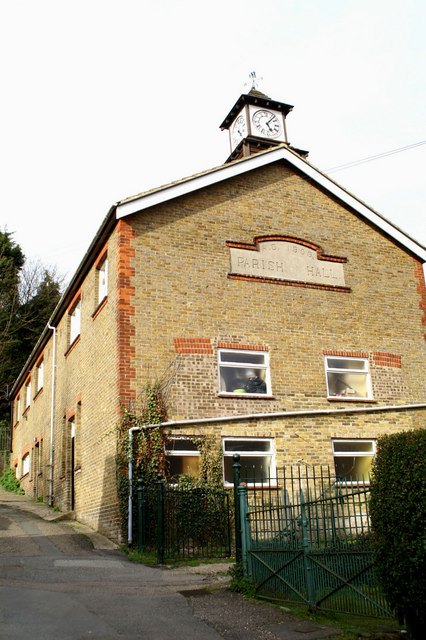
- Temple Ewell Parish Hall

- Location within Kent
- Population: 1,669 (2011)
- OS grid reference: TR287443
- District: Dover
- Shire county: Kent
- Region: South East
- Country: England
- Sovereign state: United Kingdom
- Post town: DOVER
- Postcode district: CT16
- Dialling code: 01304
- Police: Kent
- Fire: Kent
- Ambulance: South East Coast
- UK Parliament: Dover and Deal

Temple Ewell is a civil parish and historic village in the county of Kent, England. The village is part of the Dover district of Kent, and forms part of the Dover urban area. It is situated three miles North West of the town of Dover.

Situated in the Dour valley, Temple Ewell is surrounded by nature reserves and conservation areas. The village has a parish church, a village hall and a primary school. It also has a local shop and post office, and an 18th-century public house.

Temple Ewell is served by Kearsney railway station, which is situated between the villages of Temple Ewell, Kearsney and River.

The 2001 census records a population including Kearsney, of 1,696 for Temple Ewell, falling to 1,669 at the 2011 census.

== Toponymy ==
The name Ewell is derived from the Old English word ǣwielm, meaning river source or spring, and is so called because one of the sources of the River Dour rises on the village outskirts at a place called Watersend and flows through the village towards Dover. The prefix Temple indicates that at one time the village was owned by the Knights Templar.

== History ==
The village of Temple Ewell (not to be confused with Ewell village in Surrey, which has the same meaning) was founded sometime before the 8th century, and is first mentioned by name in a charter of c.772 as Æwille. In the Domesday Book of 1086, it is named Ewelle or Etwelle, and is recorded as having a manor house, five watermills, and about fifty dwellings around a small wooden Saxon church. At this time, the village was owned by Bishop Odo, the half-brother of William the Conqueror.

In 1163, the Knights Templar was granted the manor of Ewell by the crown in recognition of their role in the Holy Land, and the word Temple became prefixed to the village name. The Templars founded a Preceptory in the village, and around 1170 built the Norman church of St.Peter and St.Paul.

In 1213 King John surrendered the crown to the Pope, and it is thought that this may have taken place either at the Preceptory in Temple Ewell, or possibly in Dover.

Following the Templars' dissolution in 1312, Temple Ewell passed out of their possession in 1314. The village was then given to the Knights of St John of Jerusalem, and was retained by them until King Henry VIII dissolved the monasteries in 1540.

During the 18th and 19th and on into the 20th century (until the 1960s), Temple Ewell had two of several watermills along the stretch of the River Dour. The two mills (which still stand today as private residences) produced flour, and supplied the English troops at Dover during the Napoleonic Wars.

The railway station at Kearsney was built in 1861, linking Temple Ewell with Dover and London, and leading to an increase in population and prosperity. Temple Ewell C.E. Primary School, a parochial primary school, was established next to the church in 1871, and the Victorian schoolhouse building was completed in 1872. Major renovation work was carried out on the church in the 1870s, and a parish hall was constructed in 1909.

Between 1940 and 1944, Temple Ewell was victim to several stray shells, which were fired at the Dover area across the English Channel from France during the Second World War. One of these destroyed the church's main stained glass window when it landed outside the school.

== Nature Reserve ==
The Lydden and Temple Ewell Downs are a National Nature Reserve which borders Temple Ewell on one side, stretching up to the neighbouring village of Lydden. The reserve consists of an area of chalk downland which is home to a wide variety of flora and fauna.

== Newsletter ==
TENews Is a monthly village newsletter delivered free to every household.
