= Staple railway station =

Former railway station in England

Coordinates: 51°16′19″N 1°15′35″E

Staple

General information
- Location: Staple, Dover (district); England
- Platforms: 1

Other information
- Status: Disused

History
- Original company: East Kent Light Railway
- Post-grouping: East Kent Light Railway; Southern Region of British Railways

Key dates
- 16 October 1916: Opened
- 1 November 1948: Closed to passengers
- 1 March 1951: closed completely
Location

Staple railway station was a station on the East Kent Light Railway in southeast England, serving the village of Staple. It was located north of the village, on the west side of the road to Durlock, where it crosses over the Wingham River at Durlock Bridge.

The station site is now occupied by a farm.

== History ==
The station opened on 16 October 1916 and the last passenger train ran on 30 October 1948. There was a windpump supplying the water tower, a passing loop and four sidings. During World War Two, a large munitions dump was set up at Staple and a large calibre rail mounted gun stabled there. The windpump was demolished in June 1950.

Preceding station	Disused railways	Following station
Ash Town	16 October 1916 to 31 December 1947; East Kent Light Railway	Wingham Colliery
Ash Town	1 January 1948 to 30 October 1948; Southern Region	Wingham Colliery

== Sources ==
- Vic Mitchell, Keith Smith (1989). The East Kent Light Railway. Midhurst, Sussex, UK: Middleton Press. ISBN 0-906520-61-4.
