= Staple, Kent =

Village in Kent, England

Coordinates: 51.2639°N 1.2553°E

Staple
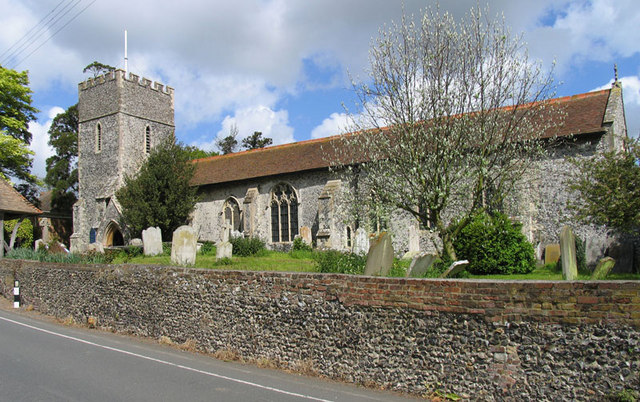
- Church of St James the Great, Staple

- Location within Kent
- Population: 771 (2011 Census including Shatterling)
- OS grid reference: TR272566
- District: Dover
- Shire county: Kent
- Region: South East
- Country: England
- Sovereign state: United Kingdom
- Post town: Canterbury
- Postcode district: CT3
- Police: Kent
- Fire: Kent
- Ambulance: South East Coast
- UK Parliament: Herne Bay and Sandwich

Staple is a village and civil parish in east Kent, England. The village lies southwest of the nearby village of Ash and the town of Sandwich, and east of Canterbury.

== History ==
The village is 3 miles (5 km) west of the Bronze Age site at Ringlemere and east of the Roman and Mesolithic sites at Wingham. The village church, dedicated to St James the Great, dates to the Saxon period but there have been Bronze Age finds in the land surrounding the village. Staple is one of the few places in Kent that does not appear in the 1086 Domesday Book, because it was appendant to Adisham, which lies to its southwest but is separated from it by the hundred and parish of Wingham. Together Adisham and Staple formed the Hundred of Downhamford. Staple is situated near the end of an arm of the Wantsum Channel, all that survives of which is the Durlock stream (possibly derived from the Celtic *duro- "settlement" and *loccu- "lake, pool", attesting the presence of the former channel). In prehistoric times this channel provided access to the sea; one reason that Staple was chosen as an export location.

Staple is a Middle English word, signifying an official market for purchase of goods for export; it derives from Anglo-Norman estaple, "market-place", The "staple" of Staple was wool, exported to the Low Countries. The 'Statute of Acton Burnell' (1283) removed the Staple from Calais to fifteen appointed places in England, Ireland and Wales. The royal appointment decreed that 'All wool for export should be gathered at the Staple, if not the selling there.' In the reign of Edward III, the Staple was removed to Queensborough on the Isle of Sheppey; its return nine years later was occasioned by the greater ease with which export to Calais was effected by Staple's proximity to Sandwich. The Staple system suffered a long slow decline and was abolished in 1617. Other export products from Staple included leather and vellum.

From 1916 to 1948 the village was served by Staple railway station on the East Kent Light Railway, north of the village at Durlock Bridge. In the Second World War, the station was used as a munitions dump, and a large-calibre rail-mounted gun was stabled there.

There are two gentlemen's seats at Staple, Crixhall and The Groves. The oldest established vineyard in East Kent was established at Staple but is no longer in use. Since 1993 Barnsole Vineyard has been operating in the village.

A fair was held twice a year, on 28 December and 25 July, offering 'toys and pedlary'. Profits from the December Fayre in 1524 amounted to six shillings and eight pence and were received by one Clement Roberth of Wingham. The winter fair was held on Childermas, a feast day where no labour was performed and thus well suited to the event. Edward Hasted mentions that fairs were held on 25 July, the feast day of St James, patron saint of labourers.

=== Air incident ===
In March 1996, 28 year old Nicholas Paine, who attended Tonbridge School, had a court martial at RAF Leeming, for passing over the village twice at low level. He was fined £500, and left the RAF, by choice. He had 'buzzed' the village in a BAE Systems Hawk aircraft, of 100 Squadron, to celebrate his 28th birthday.

== Church of St James the Great ==
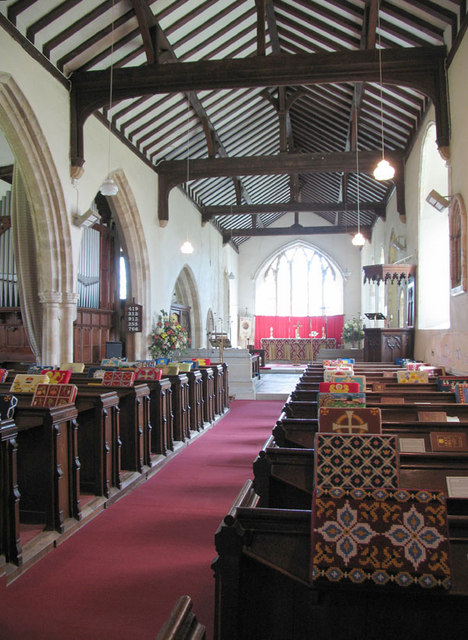
Church interior, east end

The village church, dedicated to St James the Great, was built in the 14th century as a replacement for an earlier Saxon chapel. In July 1555 the vicar of Staple, John Bland, on the orders of Queen Mary, was burnt at the stake at Martyr's Field, Canterbury. In hisThe History and Topographical Survey of the County of Kent (1778–99), Edward Hasted describes the church as consisting of "two isles and two chancels, having a tower steeple at the west end, in which are four bells. The church is remarkably long and low. The south isle and chancel are upon the same level, nor is there any separation between them. On the sides of the chancel are rails, very low, about two feet from the wall, very unusual." The restoration of the church was completed in 1868 by George Edmund Street. It has been a Grade I listed building since 11 October 1963.

== Staple Country Fayre ==
(More properly Staple Country & Craft Fayre) is an annual event staged by a group of volunteers in the tiny Kent village of Staple (CT3 1LB)

There have been village fairs in Staple for hundreds of years, but the fair in its current format has been staged every year since 1990.

- Aims:

The Staple Country Fayre's aims are two-fold: To promote a sense of community /promote social cohesion - and to raise funds for the village's various clubs, groups and organisations.

- Organisation:

These events are staged by a group of volunteers (The Staple Country & Craft Fayre Committee).

- Themes:

The Staple Country & Craft Fayre comprises several separate themes:

- The preservation of traditional rustic crafts, skills and attractions.

To this end, the fayre features craftspersons such as wood turners, leather workers, trug makers, corn dolly makers etc; and includes attractions such as tossing the bale, Maypole dancing and a fayre court (King, Queen etc).

- A traditional village fair:

Traditional village fair attractions are always included; such as bowl a pig, Punch & Judy, magic shows, a coconut shy a Produce Show Marquee, a barrow of booze, stalls selling homemade items, a cake stall, a produce stall, stationary engines, vintage tractors, a beer tent and a refreshment hall.

- Slightly less traditional fair attractions:

To keep the event popular / relevant; the fayre's various elements aren't limited to 'olde worlde' / traditional attractions. Examples of more up-to-date attractions include Classic Cars, Iconic Scooters, a Bric-a-Brac stall, a Nearly New stall, a Books & CDs stall, a Toy stall, a Pimm's Bar, a Barbecue, Candy Floss.

- All the Fun of The Fair Attractions:

In recent years The Staple Country & Craft Fayres have included Strolling Clowns, Roundabouts, a Bouncy Castle, Beat The Goalie etc.

- Misc:

The entrance to the Fayre (the Village Hall's entrance road) is the location for the annual display of Military Vehicles.

- Music:

Music Around The Grounds: These events always feature The Victory Wartime Band, a local brass quintet who provide an audio backdrop.

Music In The Arena: Each year the event's first attraction is live music. (With a second set later in the day). There have been various bands over the years; the 2017 band were invited back for the 2018 and 2019 fayres. (And were booked for the 2021 event).

- The Arena:

The arena is used for a parade by 'Staple Court' (King Queen etc), the presentation of prizes, an egg-throwing competition, a tossing the bale competition, a wellie-throwing competition, The live music spots, the Punch & Judy show, a parade of classic cars - and the day's main attraction. For the 2019 Fayre there were two attractions: The Dog & Duck Display and The Mighty Smith Show. (A strongman act).

The 2021 Staple Country & Craft Fayre will be the thirtieth.

=== Village Hall ===
'Staple Village Hall & Recreation Ground' was registered as a charity on 6 June 1979 with the charity number 277915. The hall is owned by Staple Parish Council and is managed on behalf of the parishioners by a committee of elected members and appointed representatives of village organisations. The funding for the hall was made available through a grant of £123,500 from ACRE (Action for Communities in Rural England). ACRE was awarded £10.5 million by The Millennium Commission to deliver funding for 160 village halls in England. The Millennium Commission was a legacy body of 'The Big Lottery Fund'.
