= Kearsney, Kent =

Village in Kent, England

Coordinates: 51°8′53″N 1°16′9″E

Kearsney
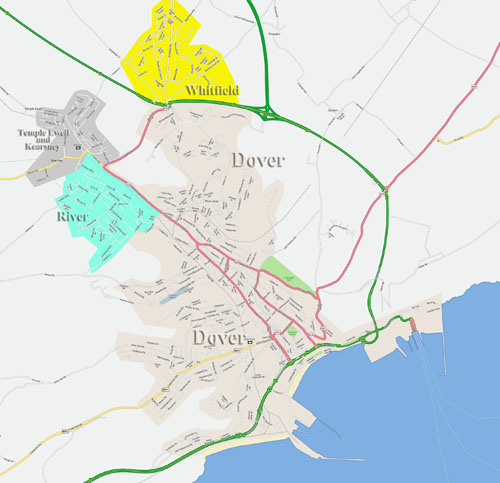
- Map of Dover (showing Kearsney between River and Temple Ewell)
- OS grid reference: TR289439
- District: Dover
- Shire county: Kent
- Region: South East
- Country: England
- Sovereign state: United Kingdom
- Post town: Dover
- Postcode district: CT16
- Dialling code: 01304
- Police: Kent
- Fire: Kent
- Ambulance: South East Coast
- UK Parliament: Dover and Deal

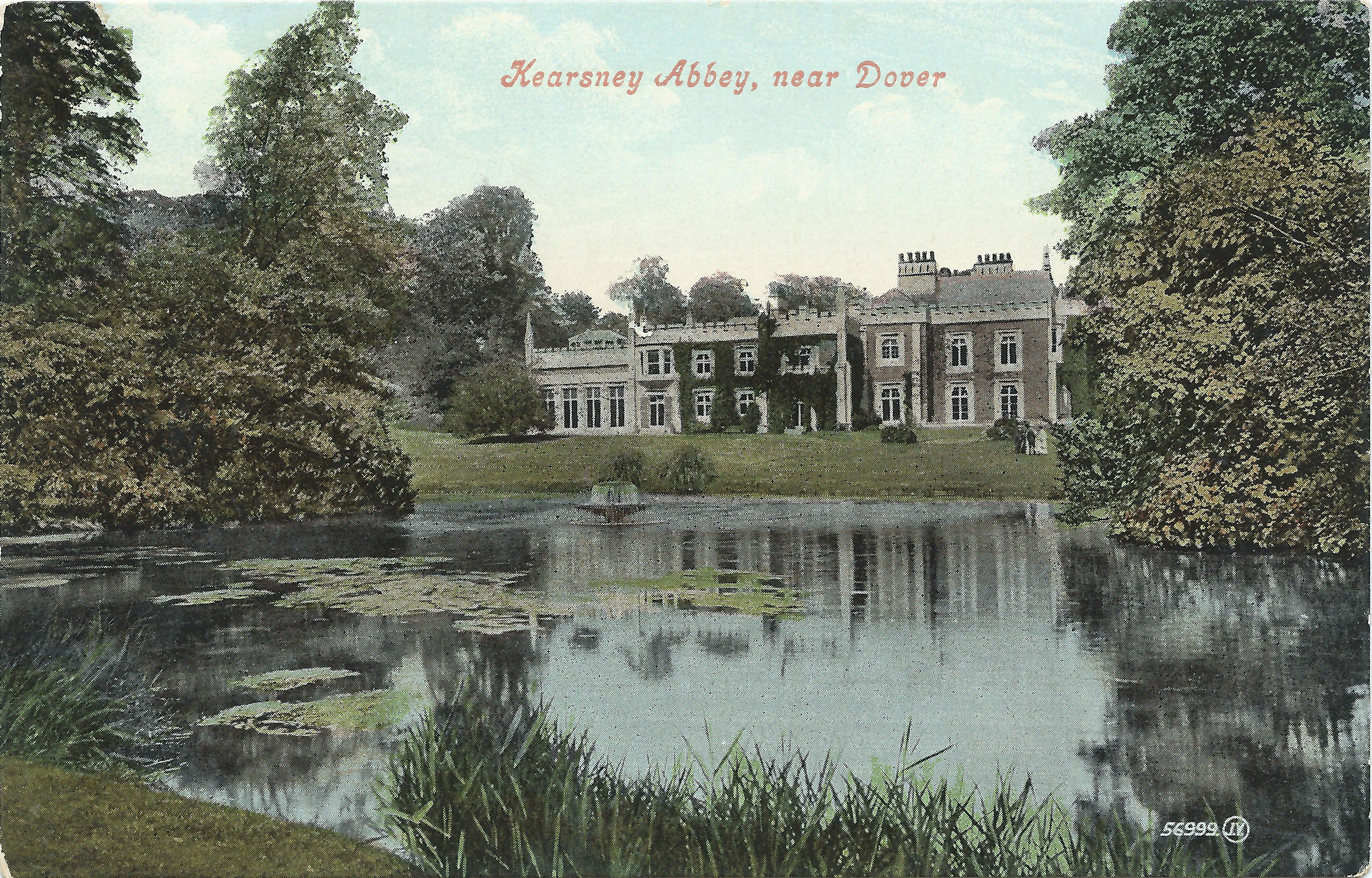
Kearnsney abbey

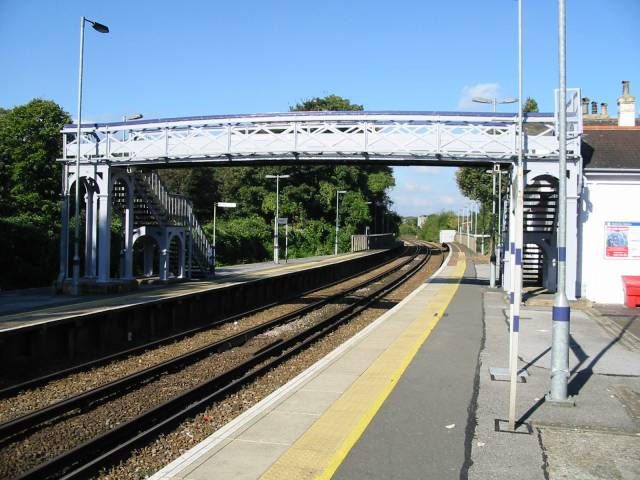
Kearsney station

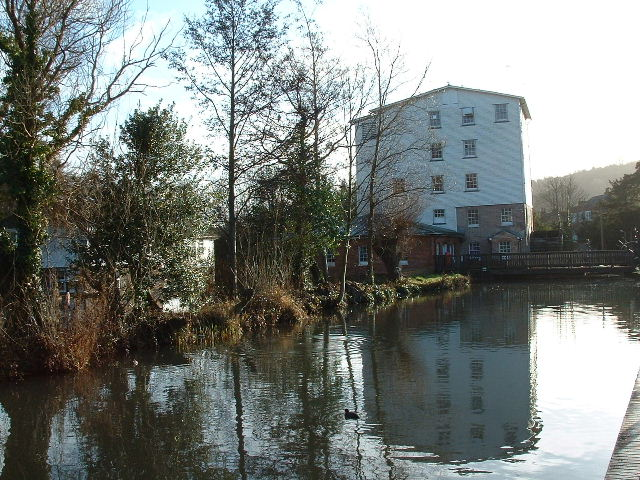
Crabble Mill

Kearsney is a village in Kent, England. At one time it would have been called a hamlet, there being no church there. The population of the village is included in the civil parish of Temple Ewell.

== Geography ==
Nowadays the village falls within the Dover urban area and sits a little over two miles northwest of Dover town centre. Much like the adjoining villages of River and Temple Ewell, it is effectively a suburb of the town. If an area can be defined as Kearsney it is the rectangle of Kearsney Avenue forming two sides and the London Road and Sandwich Roads forming the other two. Kearsney is situated between the parishes of River and Ewell. Being an administrative part of Dover borough it was part of the parish of River.

== History ==
The name is taken from an old Saxon name for a place where watercress grows. Kearsney Abbey was not an abbey, but a country house with large pleasant grounds. It is situated on the River Dour, more a large stream than river, but big enough to sustain flour mills and paper mills along its path, like Crabble Mill, which is a couple of miles downstream in River.

Kearsney railway station takes its name from the area. Kearsney station was the station for Temple Ewell and the parish of River. The community of Kearsney grew around the Railway Bell Hotel which was on the main Dover to London road. There is also a Catholic convent near to the railway station.

The famous boys' school Kearsney College in South Africa takes its name from Kearsney.
