= River Dour =

River in Kent, England

Coordinates: 51°07′25″N 1°18′52″E

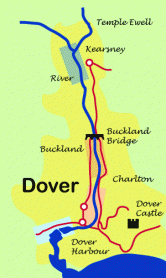
- River Dour within Dover

Physical characteristics
- Source
  - location: Temple Ewell
- Mouth
  - location: Dover Harbour
- Length: about 4 miles (6.4 km)

The River Dour is a chalk stream in the county of Kent, England. It flows from the villages of Temple Ewell and River between which is a neighbourhood served by a railway station, Kearsney. It is roughly 4 miles (6.4 km) long.

It originally had a wide estuary on the site of modern Dover, although today it flows into the Dover Harbour through a culvert. The estuary was a natural harbour for the Bronze Age settlers and traders in the area. The remains of a Bronze Age seagoing boat (from 3,500 years ago), known as the Dover Bronze Age Boat, were found in 1992, and it can be seen in Dover Museum.

The Dour Estuary was then used as a port for the Roman town, as a natural harbour for the Roman fleet. This silted up in the medieval period, necessitating the construction of various artificial harbours for Dover instead.

The river has been used since AD 762 to power various watermills along its route. These included eight corn mills and five paper mills. Buckland Mill near Buckland Bridge was one of the earliest corn mills, but has since been converted into flats. Crabble Mill is now a fully restored corn mill and museum, and the Old Mill in Kearsney is now a private house, the others have been converted for various uses.

Other industries on the river included iron foundries, saw mills (demolished) and a tannery (also converted).

Kearsney, Kent and Kearsney Abbey (a former Grand House) is also beside the River.

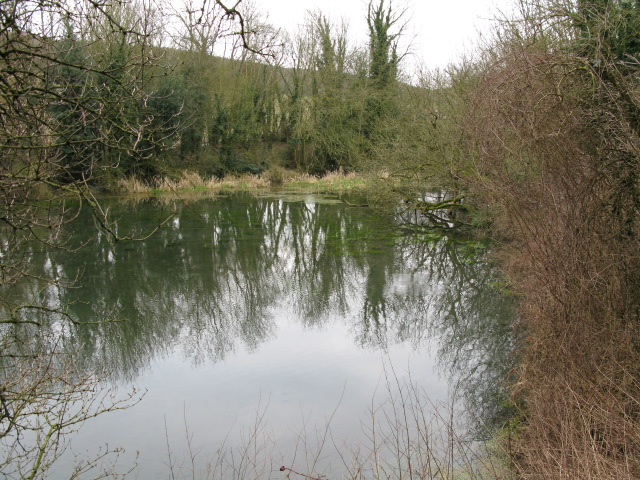
River Dour in Alkham Valley

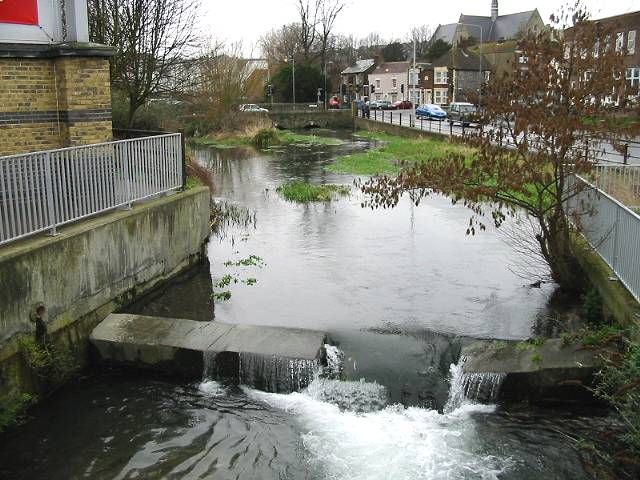
River Dour in Dover

The River Dour Trail is a new walking trail (set up by the White Cliffs Countryside Project). It follows the Dour from Temple Ewell to Wellington Dock on the seafront. The trail is about 4 miles (6 km) long and takes 2.5 hours to walk fully.
