= Wingham (Canterbury Road) railway station =

Disused railway station in England

Coordinates: 51°16′17″N 1°12′22″E

Wingham (Canterbury Road)
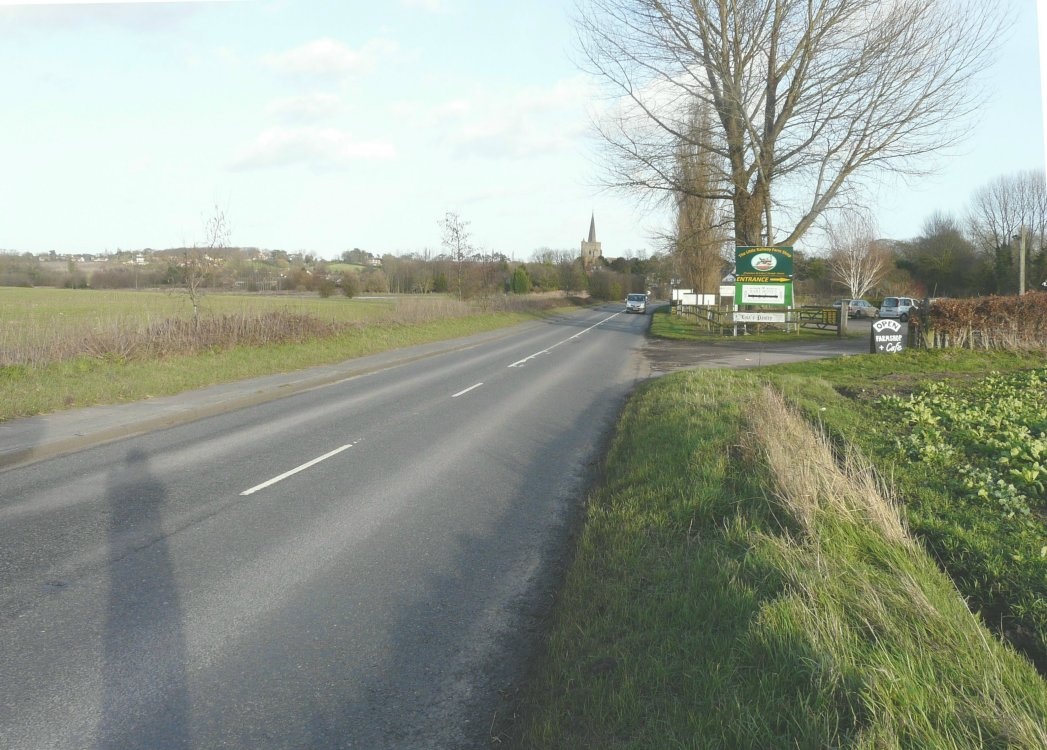
- The site of the station in 2013

General information
- Location: Wingham, Dover (district); England
- Grid reference: TR236574
- Platforms: 1

Other information
- Status: Disused

History
- Original company: East Kent Light Railway
- Post-grouping: East Kent Light Railway; Southern Region of British Railways

Key dates
- 1925: Opened
- 1 November 1948: Closed for passengers
- 1 March 1951: officially completely closed
Location

Wingham (Canterbury Road) railway station was a terminus on the East Kent Light Railway. It opened in 1925 (named Wingham) and the last passenger train ran on 30 October 1948. There was a siding to the south of the road, and carriages were usually run into the station under gravity. Occasional freight/parcel trains ran until 1950 but the station was not officially closed until 1951. After closure the cutting containing the station was infilled and covered with a field of crops. The site of the sidings is now a short section of undisturbed trackbed.

Preceding station	Disused railways	Following station
Wingham Town	1925 to 31 December 1947; East Kent Light Railway	Terminus
Wingham Town	1 January 1948 to 30 October 1948; BR(S)	Terminus

== Sources ==
- Vic Mitchell, Keith Smith (1989). The East Kent Light Railway. Midhurst, Sussex, UK: Middleton Press. ISBN 0-906520-61-4.
