= Eastry railway station =

Former railway station in England

Coordinates: 51°14′58″N 1°18′03″E

Eastry

General information
- Location: Eastry, Dover (district); England
- Grid reference: TR304553
- Platforms: 1

Other information
- Status: Disused

History
- Original company: East Kent Light Railway
- Post-grouping: East Kent Light Railway; Southern Region of British Railways

Key dates
- 16 October 1916: Opened
- 1 November 1948: Closed for passengers
- 1 March 1951: closed completely
Location

Eastry railway station was a railway station on the East Kent Light Railway. It opened on 16 October 1916 and closed to passenger traffic after the last train on 30 October 1948. It was the station before the Richborough Branch diverged from the main line to Wingham. The station served the village of Eastry, it had a passing loop, but this had been converted to a siding in 1948. The track was removed in May 1954. There is no trace of the station today as the area has been landscaped into fields.

Preceding station	Disused railways	Following station
Knowlton	16 October 1916 to 12 April 1925; East Kent Light Railway	Woodnesborough
Eastry South	13 April 1925 to May 1925; East Kent Light Railway	Woodnesborough
Eastry South	May 1925 to 1 November 1928; East Kent Light Railway	Woodnesborough; Poison Cross
Eastry South	1 November 1928 to 31 December 1947; East Kent Light Railway	Woodnesborough
Eastry South	1 January 1948 to 30 October 1948; Southern Region	Woodnesborough

== Sources ==
- Vic Mitchell, Keith Smith (1989). The East Kent Light Railway. Midhurst, Sussex, UK: Middleton Press. ISBN 0-906520-61-4.
