= Wingham Town railway station =

Former railway station in England

Coordinates: 51°16′08″N 1°12′54″E

Wingham Town

General information
- Location: Wingham, Dover (district); England
- Grid reference: TR244571
- Platforms: 1

Other information
- Status: Disused

History
- Original company: East Kent Light Railway
- Post-grouping: East Kent Light Railway; Southern Region of British Railways

Key dates
- 1920: Opened
- 1 November 1948: Closed
Location

Wingham Town railway station was a railway station on the East Kent Light Railway, which served the village of Wingham. It opened in 1920 and closed to passenger traffic after the last train on 30 October 1948. There was a loop when the station first opened, but this was removed when the line was extended to the Canterbury Road station in 1925. Today the site of the station is occupied by a row of private garages and the village Scout Hut.

| Preceding station | Disused railways | Following station |
|---|---|---|
| Wingham Colliery | 1920 to 1925; East Kent Light Railway | Terminus |
| Wingham Colliery | 1925 to 31 December 1947; East Kent Light Railway | Wingham (Canterbury Road) |
| Wingham Colliery | 1 January 1948 to 30 October 1948; BR(S) | Wingham (Canterbury Road) |

== Sources ==
- Vic Mitchell, Keith Smith (1989). The East Kent Light Railway. Midhurst, Sussex, UK: Middleton Press. ISBN 0-906520-61-4.
