= Wingham Colliery railway station =

Former railway station in England

Coordinates: 51°16′6″N 1°13′30″E

Wingham Colliery

General information
- Location: Wingham, Dover (district); England
- Platforms: 1

Other information
- Status: Disused

History
- Original company: East Kent Light Railway
- Post-grouping: East Kent Light Railway; Southern Region of British Railways

Key dates
- 16 October 1916: Opened
- 1 November 1948: Closed
Location

Wingham Colliery railway station was a railway station on the East Kent Light Railway in southeast England. It was intended to serve Wingham Colliery, a short distance to the south, but the mine was aborted without producing any coal. The railway then tried to develop a passenger business, extending the line towards Wingham Town with the long-term aim of reaching Canterbury, but ran out of money before they did so.

Today there is little trace of the station or the railway, other than a line of trees that follow the course of the old trackbed and define the edge of a field. The station buildings consisted of two small wooden structures on the north side of the track that were moved to Wingham Town when it was built; the site has now been landscaped into the field.

== History ==
It opened on 16 October 1916 and the last passenger train ran on 30 October 1948. Wingham Colliery was not developed beyond a 50-foot shaft.

Preceding station	Disused railways	Following station
Staple	16 October 1916 to 1920; East Kent Light Railway	Terminus
Staple	1920 to 31 December 1947; East Kent Light Railway	Wingham Town
Staple	1 January 1948 to 30 October 1948; Southern Region	Wingham Town
