= Kearsney railway station =

Railway station in Kent, England

Coordinates: 51.149°N 1.272°E

Kearsney
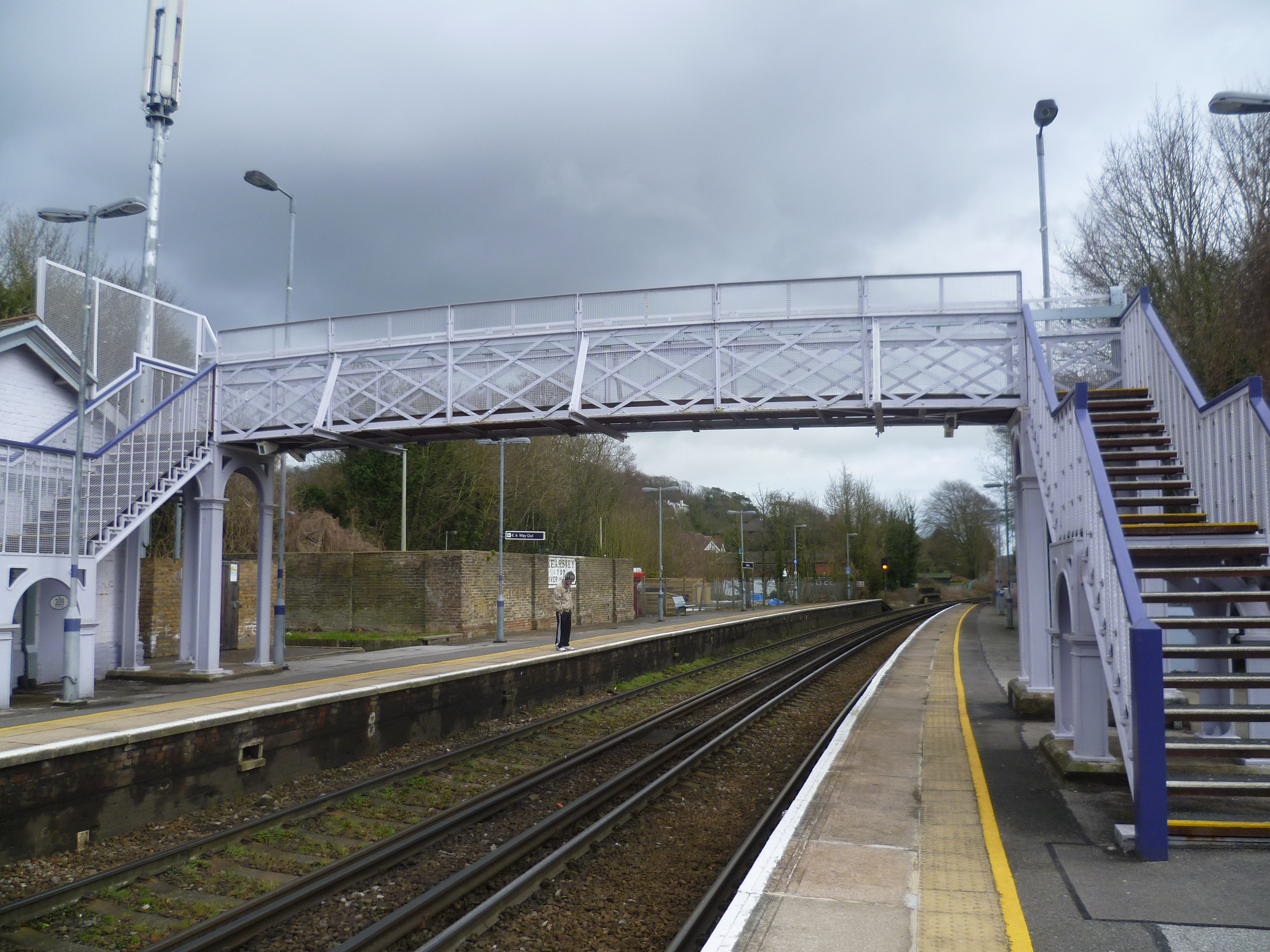
- The station in April 2013

General information
- Location: Kearsney, District of Dover; England
- Grid reference: TR289439
- Manager: Southeastern
- Platforms: 2

Other information
- Station code: KSN
- Classification: DfT category E

Key dates
- 1 August 1862: opened as Ewell
- March 1869: renamed Kearsney

Passengers
- 2021/22: ▲36,656
- 2022/23: ▲38,056
- 2023/24: ▲46,736
- 2024/25: ▲47,626
- 2025/26: ▲52,744
Location
Notes
- Passenger statistics from the Office of Rail and Road

Kearsney railway station is on the Dover branch of the Chatham Main Line in England, and serves Kearsney and Temple Ewell. It is 75 miles 9 chains (120.9 km) down the line from London Victoria and is situated between Shepherds Well and Dover Priory, the terminus.

The station and all trains that serve the station are operated by Southeastern.

The booking office in the station building on the country-bound platform is open only for very limited hours on Mondays to Fridays mornings but a Permit To Travel ticket machine (also on the country-bound platform) caters for out-of-hours ticketing.

The station and the line it serves were built by the London, Chatham & Dover Railway as the station for Temple Ewell and the parish of River. The community of Kearsney grew around the Railway Bell Hotel which was on the main Dover to London road. The station had a small goods siding, and a siding for passenger trains. The next stop towards the coast was Dover, and there was also a loop that took the railway directly onto the Kent Coast Line towards Margate, bypassing Dover. In the early days of the railway this meant trains did not always have to make the steep climb out of Dover. In practice the loop was little used for passenger trains, and mainly used by freight. Latterly the line was used by coal trains to Richborough power station.

== Services ==
All services at Kearsney are operated by Southeastern using Class 375 EMUs.

The typical off-peak service in trains per hour is:

- 1 tph to London Victoria via Chatham
- 1 tph to Dover Priory

Additional services including trains to and from London Bridge and London Cannon Street call at the station in the peak hours.

Preceding station	National Rail	Following station
Shepherds Well	Southeastern Chatham Main Line - Dover Branch	Dover Priory
