= River, Kent =

Village in Kent, England

Coordinates: 51.1447°N 1.2797°E

River
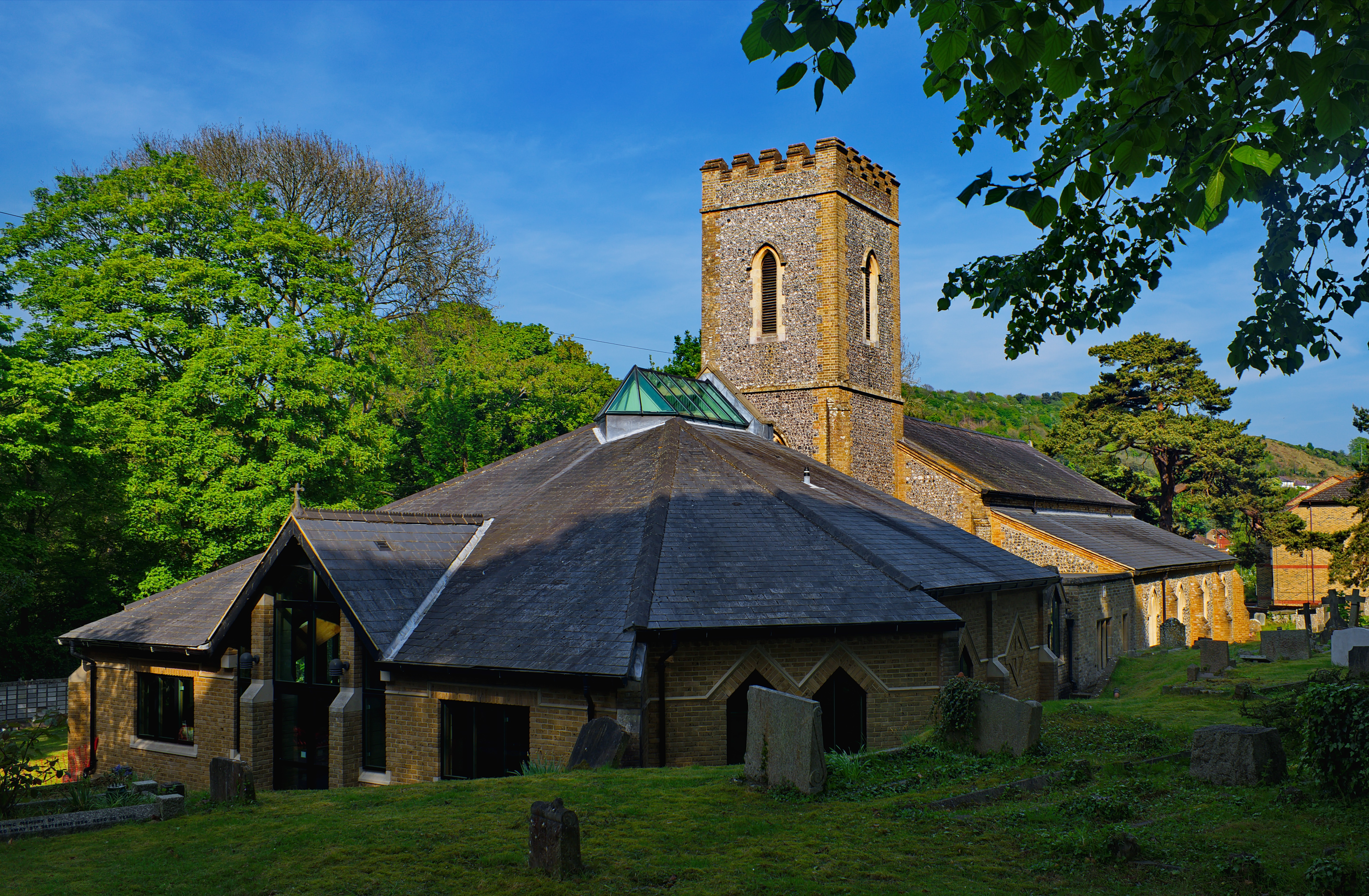
- St Peter & St Paul's Church, River

- Location within Kent
- Population: 3,876 (2011)
- OS grid reference: TR295435
- District: Dover
- Shire county: Kent
- Region: South East
- Country: England
- Sovereign state: United Kingdom
- Post town: Dover
- Postcode district: CT17
- Dialling code: 01304
- Police: Kent
- Fire: Kent
- Ambulance: South East Coast
- UK Parliament: Dover and Deal

River is a village and civil parish in Kent, England, situated very close to the historic town of Dover, the town centre of which is only 2 miles to the south, and the neighbouring village of Temple Ewell. The 2011 census recorded a population of 3,876 in the village. River is 1 mile south west of the A2 and 2 miles north of the A20, and a railway station at Kearsney provides direct access to London.

== History ==
There are two churches in the village, the 11th-century Anglican parish church of St Peter & St Paul, and a Methodist church with a history dating back to 1834.

The oldest residential sections of River date from the 1800s or earlier. Later development possibly dates to the 1930s, as well as recent developments from the 1960s and 1970s.

== Geography ==
River is situated in a steep wooded valley formed by the River Dour. At its north-west end the valley splits into the Dour Valley, in which Temple Ewell lies, and the Alkham Valley, which for much of the time is dry but which contains the Drellingore, a highly seasonal stream characteristic of chalk downland (another example being the nearby Nailbourne). The confluence of the Dour and Drellingore rivers is situated in Kearsney Abbey.

At the valley floor, River is on average about 100 feet (30 m) above sea level. Along the axis of the Dour, the land slopes gradually down towards the sea about 3 miles (5 km) distant. The common land areas above Kearsney Abbey provide a view of Dover and its castle, and much of the area consists of delicate chalk grassland.

== Governance ==
River comes under the jurisdiction of Dover District Council and is in the Dover and Deal parliamentary constituency. River has had its own Parish Council since 1987. An electoral ward in the same name exists. This ward includes Hougham Without and has a total population at the 2011 census of 4,564.

== Economy ==
River once had a number of shops, but most have gradually closed; a small Co-op supermarket, as well as two other grocery stores exist in the town today. River retains its post office, as well as a pharmacy, a convenience store and a Chinese take-away.

The village has a park, Kearsney Abbey, and two other parks nearby.

== Recreation and culture ==
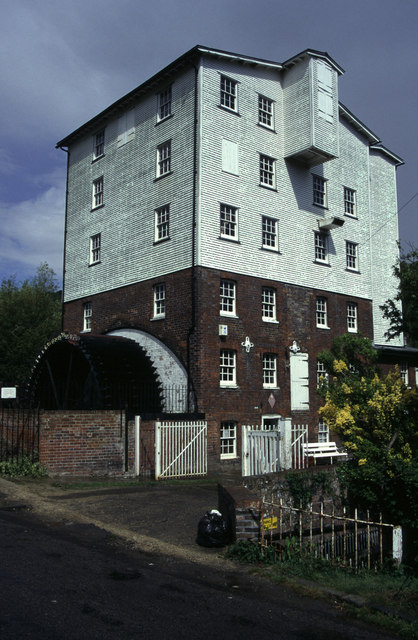
Crabble Corn Mill

There are two significant green areas, the River Recreation Ground (which is home to the River Bowling Club) and Kearsney Abbey. Despite its name, Kearsney Abbey was never a monastic estate but was the name given to a manor house, built by the Fector family in the early 19th century. The house fell into disrepair after World War II and was demolished around 1960. All that remains of the building today is the billiard room.

The nearby stadium of Crabble Athletic Ground is home to Dover Athletic F.C., and is situated at the Dover end of Lewisham Road. Crabble once had a cricket ground, the home of the now defunct Dover Cricket Club, which used to host First Class cricket.

The park of Russell Gardens is situated on the Alkham Valley Road beyond Kearsney Abbey.

During the 2020 COVID-19 lockdown, local artist and DJ Vicky Thomas created a series of painted paving slabs which developed into a popular trail around the village. Local residents suggested designs and visitors came to River to see the artworks. The project also raised money for Pilgrims Hospices, and 35 of the slabs were selected for permanent display in the village. In 2021, a selection of the slabs was installed at the former bus terminus as a permanent commemoration of the pandemic.

Topper Headon, drummer of the Punk Rock band The Clash currently lives in the village.

The village has a primary school of about 400 pupils.

== Mills ==
River owes its early existence to milling. The River Dour, which runs through the village and along which Lower Road is built, once supported several water-powered flour and paper mills. One of them, formerly known as Mannering's Mill but now known as Crabble Corn Mill (built in 1812), survives in working form. It now promotes itself as a visitor attraction and restaurant.

The site of the other major mill in River is disused, situated at the downstream end of Kearsney Abbey. It forms a habitat for water birds such as grey wagtails and kingfishers. Other mills existed further downstream, but all have been either demolished or converted for other industry or housing.
