= East Kent Railway (heritage) =

Heritage railway in Kent, England

Coordinates: 51°11′50″N 1°15′8″E

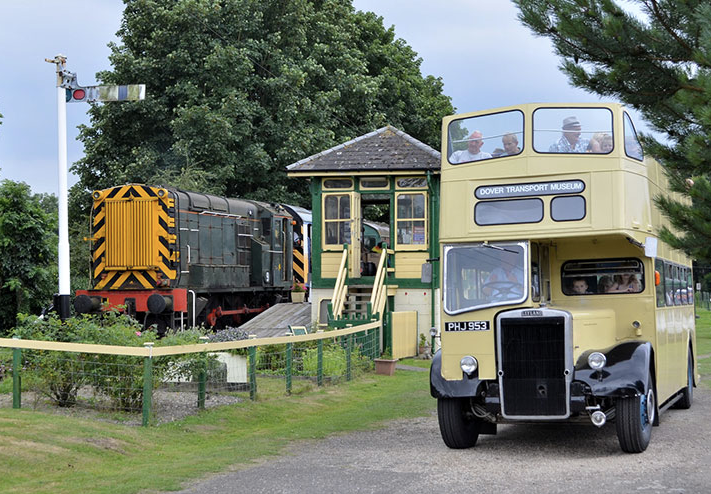
- NS687 sits at Eythorne behind the old Selling signal box as a bus leaves for the Dover Transport Museum during a joint event in 2015.
- Locale: Kent, England

Commercial operations
- Built by: Colonel Stephens
- Original gauge: 4 ft 8 1/2 in (1,435 mm) standard gauge

Preserved operations
- Owned by: East Kent Railway Trust
- Operated by: East Kent Railway Trust
- Length: 2.4 miles (3.9 km)
- Preserved gauge: 4 ft 8 1/2 in (1,435 mm) standard gauge

Commercial history
- Opened: 1911
- Closed: 1988

Preservation history
- Headquarters: Shepherdswell

The East Kent Railway (EKR) is a heritage railway in Kent, England. It is located at Shepherdswell station on the London and Chatham to Dover mainline. The line was constructed between 1911 and 1917 to serve the Kent Coalfields. See East Kent Light Railway for details of the original lines. The Kent Collieries were mostly a failure with only Tilmanstone on the line producing any viable commercial coal and commercial traffic over the line. The line is operated by heritage diesel locomotives. It is home to a collection of heritage diesel locomotives including a British Rail Class 08, DEMU and electric multiple units including an in service British Rail Class 404 built in the 1930s and a more modern British Rail Class 365, which is to be used as a restaurant and a major events venue.

At Shepherdswell, there is a large cafe, a large 15-acre (6.1 ha) woodland area with walking routes, a 5 in (127 mm) gauge miniature railway, a 7 1/4 in (184 mm) gauge woodland miniature railway, a model railway and a small museum. Shepherdswell is where the railway undertakes its maintenance and overhaul works and is very much a working railway yard.

At Eythorne, there is a Class 365 EMU that has been converted to a restaurant and bar. There is a General Utility Van built by BR that used to carry elephants which is in the process of being converted to a small holiday let. The old Selling Signal Box is also here with a history of the East Kent Railway both past and present inside along with the original Faversham signalling panel. Eythorne Station plays host to a variety of features on special event days. Eythorne is the picture of a pretty countryside station.

The railway holds special events throughout the year, ranging from railway enthusiast events to beer festivals along with family fun weekends.

On the line there is Golgotha Tunnel (situated between Shepherdswell and Eythorne), 477 yards (436 m) long, making it the eighth longest tunnel on a UK Heritage Railway in Preservation. The tunnel was built in typical Colonel Stephens style by building double track portals but only excavating a single track internally to save money.

== Rolling stock ==
=== Steam Locomotives ===
- Avonside 0-6-0ST No. 2004 'St. Dunstan'. Previously Located at British Coal Snowdown. Undergoing cosmetic restoration and on static display.
- Peckett and Sons 0-4-0ST No.2087 'Achilles'. Privately owned but based at the railway long term.

=== Diesel Locomotives ===
- Vanguard 0-4-0 No. 01543. Previously used at MOD Kineton. Arrived May 2016. In Service.
- Class 08 0-6-0DE No. 08676. Ex EWS, Privately owned. Arrived October 2016. In Service.
- Fowler 0-4-0DM No. 416002 'Snowdown'. Previously located at British Coal Snowdown. Out of traffic. (Privately Owned)
- Ruston 0-6-0DH LSSH No. AD427 'The Buffs' and 'The Royal Engineers 9th Field Squadron'. Works No. 466616. In service. (Privately owned)
- Class 73 No. 73130. Privately owned. Arrived November 2023. Under overhaul.

=== Diesel Multiple Units ===
- BR 2H DEMU no. 205001. In Service, on passenger trains, and restoration to BR Blue livery. Currently the unit is out of service and being refurbished. The unit was also involved in the Cowden Crash of 1994 but was luckily not damaged.
- In May 2020 a BR class 142 Pacer "142 036" retired by Northern has been preserved by the East Kent Railway and runs on the heritage railway along with sister unit "142 017".

=== Electric stock ===
- 4-COR Driving Motor Brake Third Saloon 11182 from u.3142.
- 4-COR Driving Motor Brake Third Open 11161 from u.3142.
- 4-VEP Driving Trailer Composite Lavatory 76875 from u.3545 In regular use
- 4-VEP Driving Trailer Second Open Lavatory 76397 from u.3905.
- 4-VEP Driving Trailer Second Open Lavatory 76398 from u.3905.
- 4-VEP Trailer Second Open 70904 from u.3905.
- 4-CIG Motor Brake Second Open 62385 from u.1399.
- 457 Driving Motor Standard Open 67300 from u.7001.
- 365 Driving Motor Second Open (B) 65974 from 365540
- 365 Driving Motor Second Open (A) 65917 from 365524
- 365 Trailer Second Open 72287 from 365524

=== Hauled coaches ===
- BR Gatwick Express Set. Consisting of x3 488 Coaches and Class 489 EMU
- BR Mk.1 Gangwayed Full Brake 80785, under conversion to a Bar. (privately owned)
- BR Mk.1 Brake Second 43140 (under-frame only), In use as Rail Carrier.
- BR Mk.2 Brake First Corridor 14123. (In Service)
- BR Mk.2 Restaurant First Open 1215. (In Service - Privately Owned)
- Pullman SECR 43 Parlour First "Sapphire". (Privately Owned)
- Pullman SECR 99 Parlour First "Padua". (Privately Owned)
- Pullman SECR 102 Kitchen First "Rosalind". (Privately Owned)

There is also a wide variety of wagons at Shepherdswell.

== The EKR today as a heritage railway ==
A preservation group was formed in 1987 to preserve part of the abandoned line as far as the old coal mine at Tilmanstone. By 1989, a majority of the lineside vegetation had been cleared and by 1995 the first heritage train was run.

Following the reopening of the railway, a new platform was constructed on the site of the former equivalent at Eythorne and the former signalbox from Selling was moved to the northern end of the platform in the mid 1990s. The railway also owns the Barham Signal Box from the closed Elham Valley Line which houses a detailed mural painting of the old East Kent Railway route, this can be found at Shepherdswell.

The EKR operates on most Sundays and bank holidays between April and September.

The EKR also owns an extensive ancient woodland known as "The Knees". The railway uses The Knees as an educational resource, woodland walks - the bluebells in spring are a popular attraction and for special events such as Halloween.

The railway hosts other groups, including the Southern Electric Group, 400 Series Preservation and the 427 Locomotive Group. The Network SouthEast Railway Society also have a facility here in the form of a display container which is splendidly painted in the classic Toothpaste Livery.

The railway hosts two apprenticeship schemes for Permanent Way and Civil Engineering training. The railway also hosts other organisations and offers facilities for third parties to undertake training.

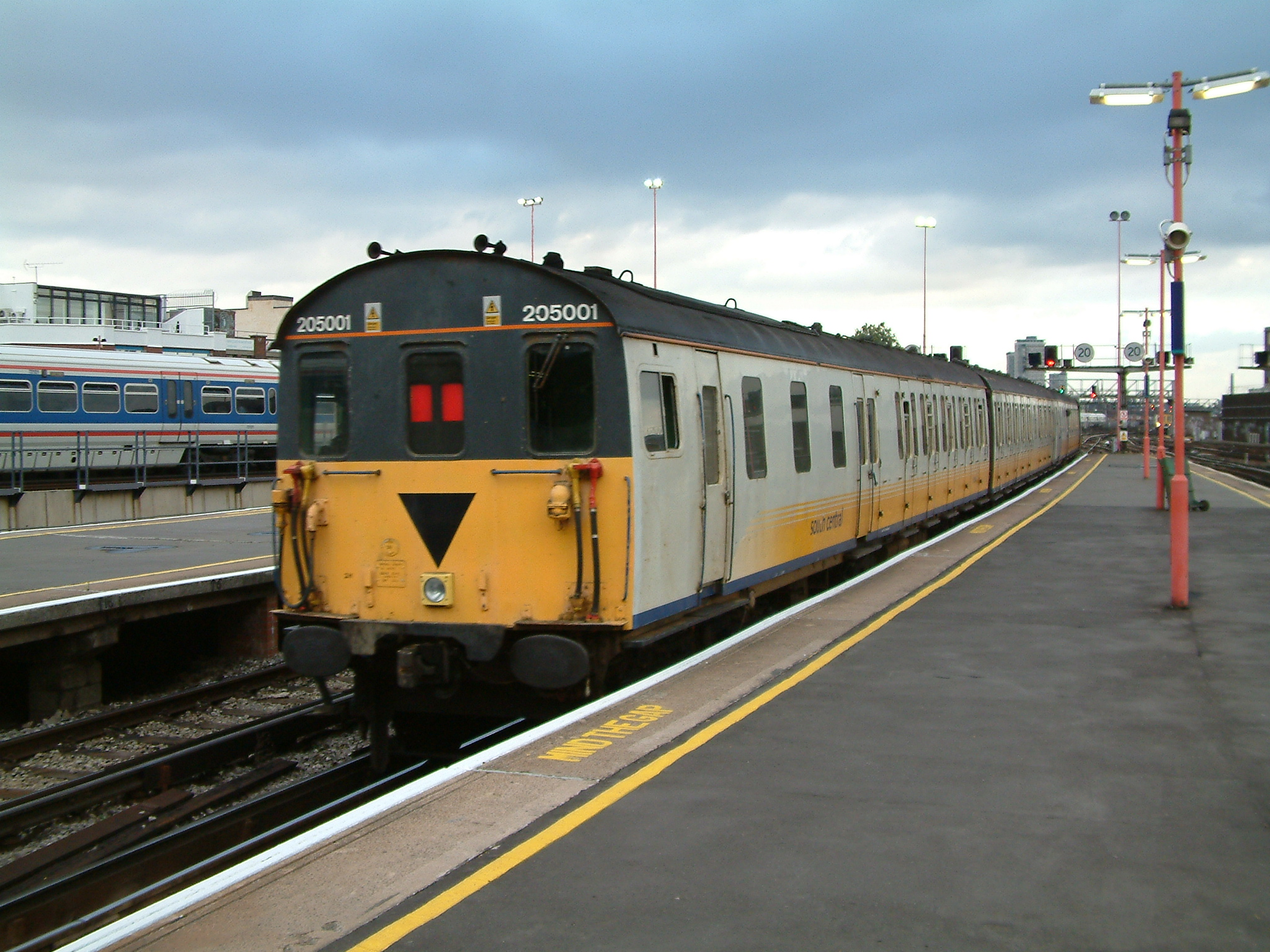
Unit 205 001 (1101) before preservation, seen at London Bridge

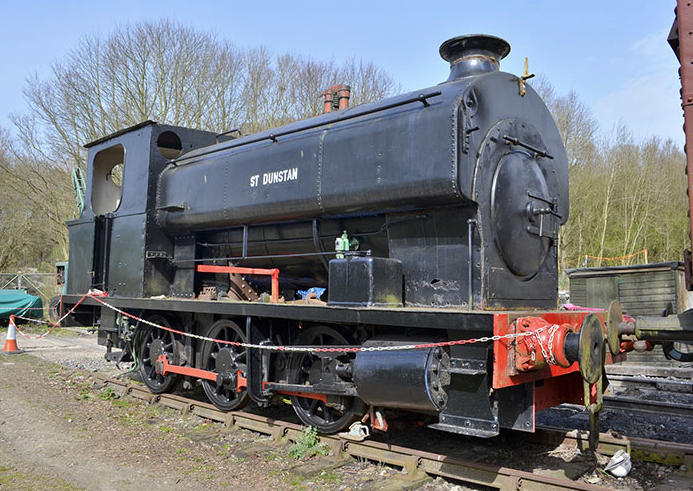
St Dunstan at the East Kent Railway in protective paint awaiting cosmetic restoration
