= Shepherdswell =

Village in Kent, England

Coordinates: 51.1866°N 1.2312°E

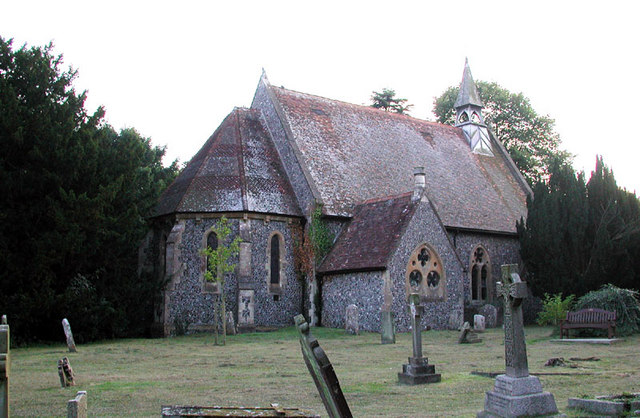
- St Andrew's Church, Shepherdswell

- Location within Kent
- Population: 1,630 (2011)
- OS grid reference: TR259480
- Civil parish: Shepherdswell with Coldred
- District: Dover
- Shire county: Kent
- Region: South East
- Country: England
- Sovereign state: United Kingdom
- Post town: Dover
- Postcode district: CT15
- Dialling code: 01304
- Police: Kent
- Fire: Kent
- Ambulance: South East Coast
- UK Parliament: Dover

Shepherdswell (also Sibertswold or Sibert's Wold) is a village and former civil parish, now in the parish of Shepherdswell with Coldred, in the Dover district of Kent, England. In 2011 it had a population of 1630.

== Culture and community ==
Village social life centres on the local Grade I listed church 'Church of St Andrew', and the village hall which hosts events including charity jumble sales and a pre-school playgroup. The village pub is the Grade II listed Bell by the village green, near to the church. Additionally the village has a Co-op mini-supermarket and a family-run farm shop (Frys’ Farm Shop).

Shepherdswell is significant for the East Kent Railway, whose terminus is sited there. This was originally one of Colonel Stephens's lines and ran to Wingham. The section as far as Eythorne is now run by a preservation society. It has a mainline railway station named Shepherds Well with direct trains to Dover and London via Faversham.

The village is on the Miner's Way Trail. The trail links the coalfield parishes of East Kent. In the village it links with the North Downs Way, which also passes through the village between Whitfield and Woolage Village. The section of the North Downs Way from Shepherdswell to Dover follows the Via Francigena (Road from France) which is the ancient pilgrim route from England, through France and Switzerland, to Rome.

Also of note is West Court Farm House, a Grade II* listed building which used to be a resthouse for the monks of St Radigund's Abbey.

=== Sport ===
Shepherdswell is also home to the "Shepherdswell Spartans Football Club". Football has been played in the village of Shepherdswell for at least 98 years. Originally the team was called Shepherdswell FC and played from about 1908 until 1965. The name of the next major club in the village was the Whitehall Spartans, who played for most of the 1970s; they became responsible for the name of today's current team. In 1983–84, a team was formed again and named after their then sponsors A1 Taxis which entered the Dover District Sunday League. By the start of the next season their name had reverted to Shepherdswell Spartans as the main team in the village. They took the name Spartans from the local pub, The Whitehall Inn, which was their social base until the pub was shut down in 1989.

Shepherdswell's cricket team is Shepherdswell C.C. The team plays "friendly" village fixtures from May to September each year against other Kent teams.

Both the football and cricket teams play on Shepherdswell Recreation Ground.

== History ==
In 1961 the parish had a population of 1085. On 1 April 1963 the parish was abolished and merged with Coldred to form "Shepherdswell with Coldred". .The village of shepherdswell has been here for the last 200 years, there are many small landmarks like Saint andrews church, the East Kent Railway where some WW2 bunkers are found and places like "the old school" which has now been replaced by Sibertswold Primary School.
