= East Kent Light Railway =

Railway in England

The East Kent Light Railway was a light railway in south-east England, which formed part of Colonel H. F. Stephens' collection of cheaply-built railways, that ran from its own terminus at Shepherdswell to Wingham (Canterbury Road) with a branch from Eastry to Richboro Port. Built primarily for colliery traffic within the Kent Coalfields, the line featured several spurs and branches to serve them, with cancelled extensions to other proposed sites. The success of Tilmanstone colliery allowed the remainder of the line to continue operation until the 1980s, this section becoming part of the East Kent heritage railway.

== History ==
The East Kent Light Railway, shown with other railway lines in Kent

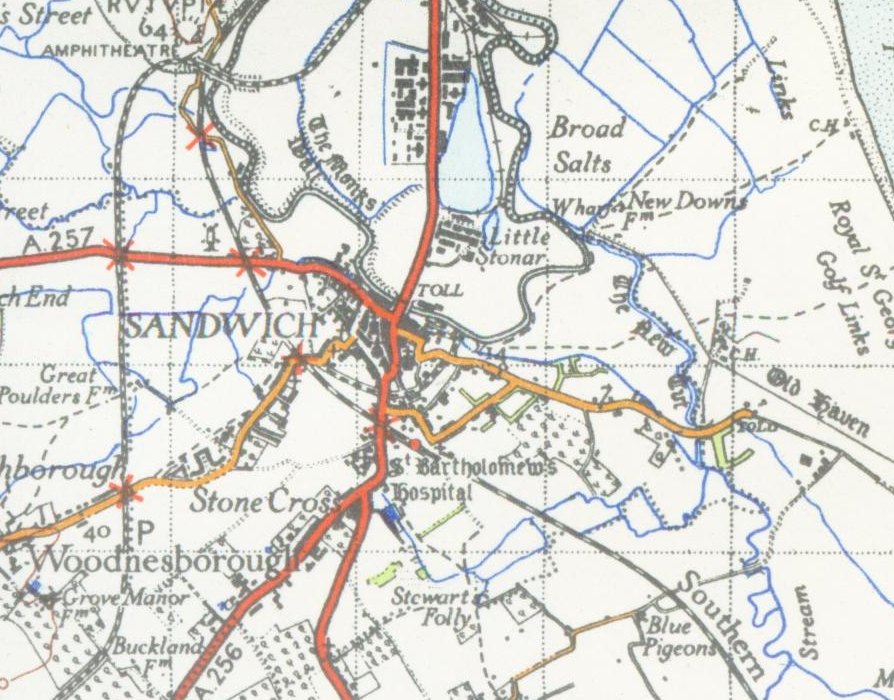
A 1945 Ordnance Survey of Sandwich showing the location of the mainline station and the branch of the light railway

=== Construction ===
When the initial construction of the Channel Tunnel was halted in the 1880s, the associated tunnelling company commenced research to confirm the speculation of coal being situated in Kent. The result led to the discovery of iron ore and coal in 1890. Keen to exploit the discovery, test bores began to be sunk in east Kent by the turn of the 20th century and the first collieries were established at Tilmanstone, Guilford, Stonehall, Snowdown, Goodnestone, Chislet and Wingham.

Proposals to serve the Kent coalfields by rail were not conceived until 1909, when the East Kent Mineral (Light) Railways put forward a network of lines consolidated from no fewer than 40 prior proposals linking nine collieries to a new coal port at Richborough and a junction at Shepherdswell alongside a branch to Canterbury. The light railway was promoted by the Kent Coal Concessions, who owned the majority of the new mines.

Following public enquiries in October 1910, the revised application made the following February saw the Wingham–Canterbury line removed as a result of local opposition and the East Kent Light Railways Order 1911 was granted on 19 June 1911.

The need for materials to build two of the first collieries at Tilmanstone and Guilford resulted in the railway's rapid construction from Shepherdswell, where a temporary line to Tilmanstone was put in place by October 1911, a more permanent line being established in June 1912. Further parts of the network opened in stages, with lines to Eastry, Guilford, Hammill and Wingham collieries opening throughout 1912.

Although the East Kent Light Railway (EKLR) operated a passenger train carrying the railway's shareholders to Tilmanstone in November 1912, regular services did not commence until 16 October 1916, at first running between Shepherdswell and Wingham Colliery before extending to Wingham Town in 1920, all stations (or essentially halts) receiving basic facilities. The next major extension to the EKLR opened in April 1925 from Eastry to Sandwich Road, followed by a shorter extension to Wingham (Canterbury Road) that November.

Subsequently, though at an unknown date, the EKLR built its final extension to Richboro [sic] Port, reaching there via two bridges, each spanning the South Eastern and Chatham Railway (SE&CR)'s Dover–Ramsgate line and the River Stour. However, the actual bridge erected over the latter differed largely from the proposals, which led to passenger trains being refused permission to traverse the line. As a result, Richboro Port station never opened.

=== Operations ===
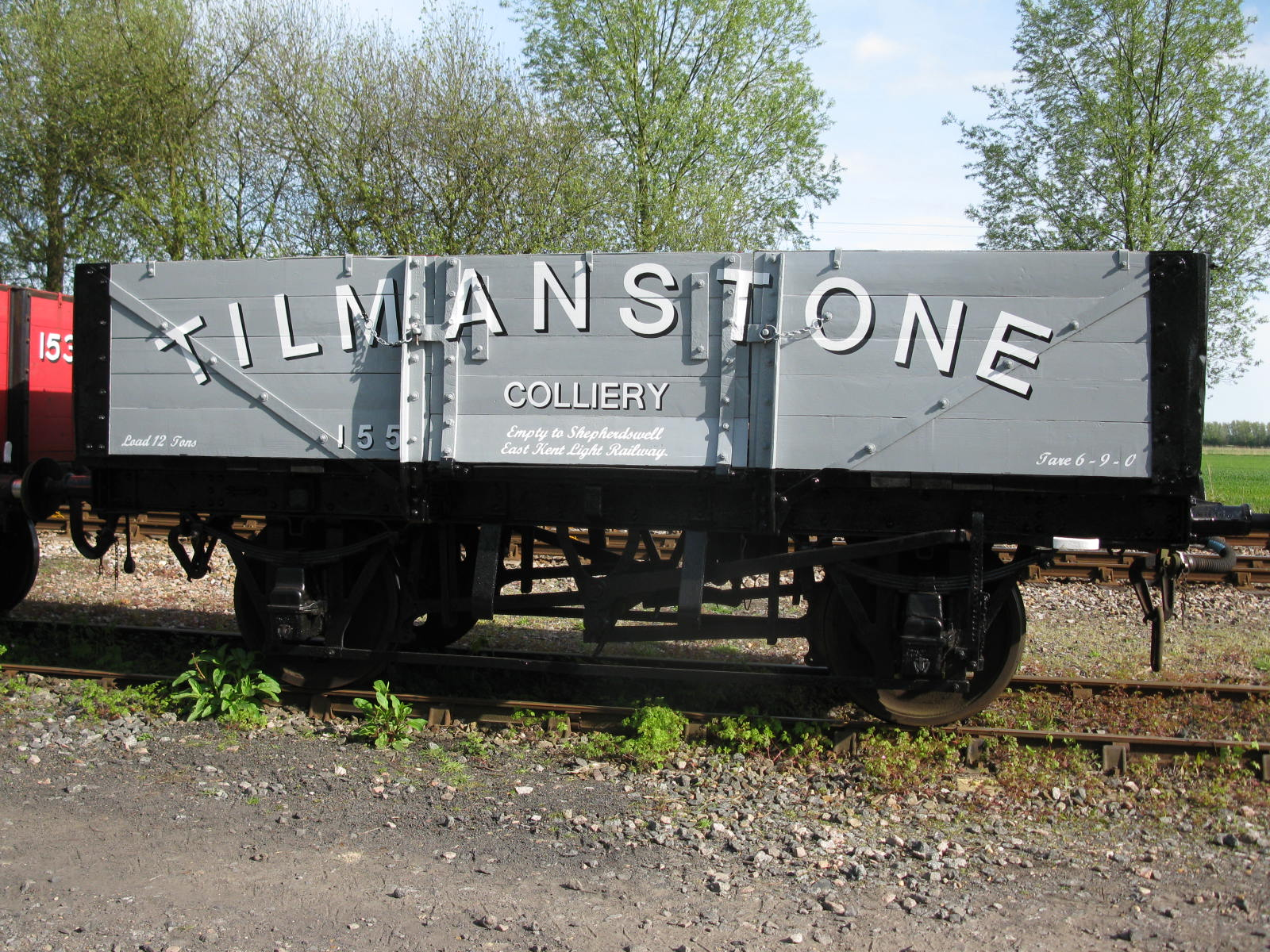
An open wagon in the livery of Tilmanstone Colliery

Many of the new collieries that the Light Railway was meant to serve failed in their early years, owing to the coal being of poor quality; the mines needing a large depth to access the material, leading to the increased risk of floodings; and their lack of profitability. Only Tilmanstone became successful, though its coal failed to sell on the export market.

The outbreak of the First World War in 1914 resulted in their closures or delays and abandonments to their construction. Afterwards, some collieries were repurposed for other uses, such as Hammill colliery opening as a brickworks in 1926, to which EKLR trains delivered coal to supply its furnaces. The Richborough coal port was also never fully developed, despite its use as a naval base during the First World War, as heavy silting of the coastline, attributed by its location next to the River Stour, prevented stable grounds for industrial facilities.

After the extension to Wingham opened, the EKLR attempted to further extend the line to a terminus near Canterbury West, linking to a proposed colliery near Stodmarsh and crossing the Sturry road (now part of the A28) at level. This was objected to by Canterbury City Council over the busy nature of the Sturry road and suggested the EKLR could join the SE&CR's Ashford–Ramsgate line at Sturry, though the EKLR argued track access fees would limit operations to Canterbury. The original route would eventually be approved in 1920 on condition that a bridge was built over the Sturry road, which the EKLR did not have the funds for one. Ultimately, the extension was never built as local buses popularised in linking the local villages, including Wingham, to Canterbury. Further extensions to Deal and Birchington-on-Sea were explored but never pursued.

Much like other light railways, the East Kent was exempted from being made to join a larger grouping company under the Railways Act 1921 and remained independent for the next few decades, though the newly-established Southern Railway (SR) tried to influence the EKLR by buying £44,000 worth of discounted shares in 1926 (£2,300,000 in 2025) but later lost interest.

Passenger services on the EKLR ran as mixed trains (both passenger coaches and goods wagons being conveyed) between Shepherdswell and Wingham (Canterbury Road) three times per day on weekdays, with an additional trip on Saturday evenings, the end-to-end journey time taking 43–50 minutes. Frequency was later reduced to twice-daily, taking over an hour to traverse the line. Those on the Sandwich Road line were short-lived, having ran daily then twice-weekly round trips for three years before withdrawing them on 31 October 1928.

Throughout the railway's existence, it acquired a diverse collection of second-hand rolling stock. Industrial 0-6-0 tank engines were initially used on the railway, in addition to hiring locomotives from the Kent and East Sussex Railway (K&ESR), before acquiring ex-London and South Western Railway (LSWR) locomotives. Passenger coaches, initially bought from the K&ESR, had their origins from other railway companies, these being the London, Chatham and Dover Railway, the LSWR and the Midland Railway. Some also had their first class designation left in place despite the EKLR never selling first class tickets.

In addition to the coal traffic between Tilmanstone and Shepherdswell, small amounts of agricultural and domestic goods were carried on the East Kent, with seasonal produce being sent to London for sale at the Covent Garden markets and bricks being transported locally from the Hammill brickworks.

=== Decline ===
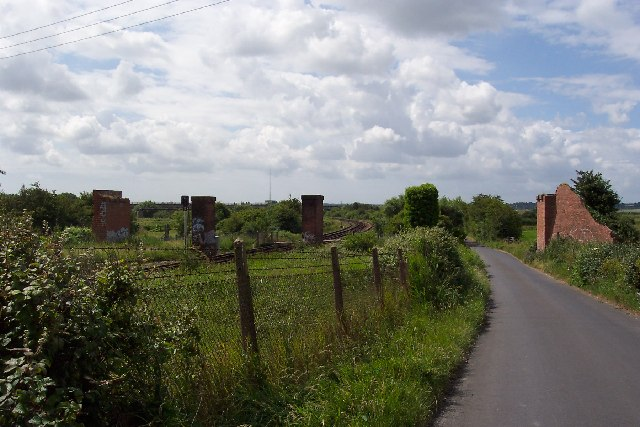
The remains of the Richboro Port bridge over the Dover–Ramsgate line near in 2004

Upon the outbreak of the Second World War, the British Army took over control of the East Kent, relaying new track in the process. Its strategic importance resulted in a significant rise in goods traffic. Between May and August 1940, a squadron of the Royal Air Force (RAF) took over control of Staple railway station, closing it to the public in the meantime, to maintain access to nearby Bekesbourne Aerodrome. Following the RAF's departure, and in the event of German invasion, large calibre railway guns were stationed across the EKLR at Eythorne, Shepherdswell and Staple until December 1944.

At the end of hostilities in 1945, the line reverted to independent ownership and traffic immediately fell to pre-war levels. As it came under national ownership, becoming part of the Southern Region of British Railways, its unsustainable figures resulted in the immediate withdrawal of the remaining passenger services on 30 October 1948. With horticultural traffic being transferred to road, closures on the rest of the East Kent soon followed: the Richboro Port line closed to goods on 1 January 1950 while the Eastry–Wingham line continued until 25 July that year, followed by the closure of the Eastry–Eythorne line on 28 February 1951.

The EKLR was dismantled throughout the 1950s, with the final section being removed in 1958. As Tilmanstone colliery still actively produced coal, the remaining section of the line to Shepherdswell remained open for goods traffic, with a temporary ceasement during the 1984–85 miners' strike, until its closure in 1986. Simultaneously, a society of railway preservationists was formed with the intention of saving and reopening remaining section of the line. Following years of restoration, the East Kent Light Railway Order 1993 (SI 1993/2154) was obtained, allowing regular passenger trains after an absence of 40 years. Today, the heritage railway of the same name operates preserved passenger services as far as Eythorne, with the remaining line to Tilmanstone surviving but mothballed.

== Sources ==
- Beddall, Matthew (1997). East Kent Light Railway, A History of the Line in Combination with the Kent Coalfield. Solo Publications. ISBN 978-0-9532952-0-3.
- Bradley, D.L. (1967). Locomotives of the L.S.W.R. Vol. Part 2. Railway Correspondence and Travel Society.
- Bradley, D.L. (October 1975). Locomotives of the Southern Railway. Vol. Part 1. London: Railway Correspondence and Travel Society. ISBN 978-0-901115-30-0.
- Bradley, D.L. (September 1985) [1963]. The Locomotive History of the South Eastern Railway (2nd ed.). London: Railway Correspondence and Travel Society. ISBN 978-0-901115-48-5.
- Catt, A.R. (1970). East Kent Light Railway. Oakwood Press. ISBN 978-0-85361-017-5.
- Course, Edwin (1976). The Railways of Southern England: Independent & Light Railways. Batsford. ISBN 978-0-7134-3196-4.
- Elks, Ken (2002). East Kent Railway Tickets 1916-48. Solo Publications. ISBN 978-0-9532952-2-7.
- Lawson Finch, Maurice; Garrett, Stephen R. (2003). East Kent Railway (two vv). Oakwood Press. ISBN 978-0-85361-609-2.
- Harding, Peter (1997). Memories of the East Kent Light Railway. self published. ISBN 978-0-9523458-2-4.
- Klapper, Charles (1937). East Kent Light Railway. Railway Magazine. This is a rare item. Dover Library has a reference copy.
- Ritchie, Arthur Edward (1919). Kent Coalfield, Its Evolution and Development. Iron and Coal Trades Review. OCLC 977935990.
- Smith, Keith; Mitchell, Vic (1989). The East Kent Light Railway. Midhurst, Sussex: Middleton Press. ISBN 978-0-906520-61-1.
