= St Giles' Church, Wormshill =

Church in Wormshill, Kent, England

St. Giles Church, Wormshill
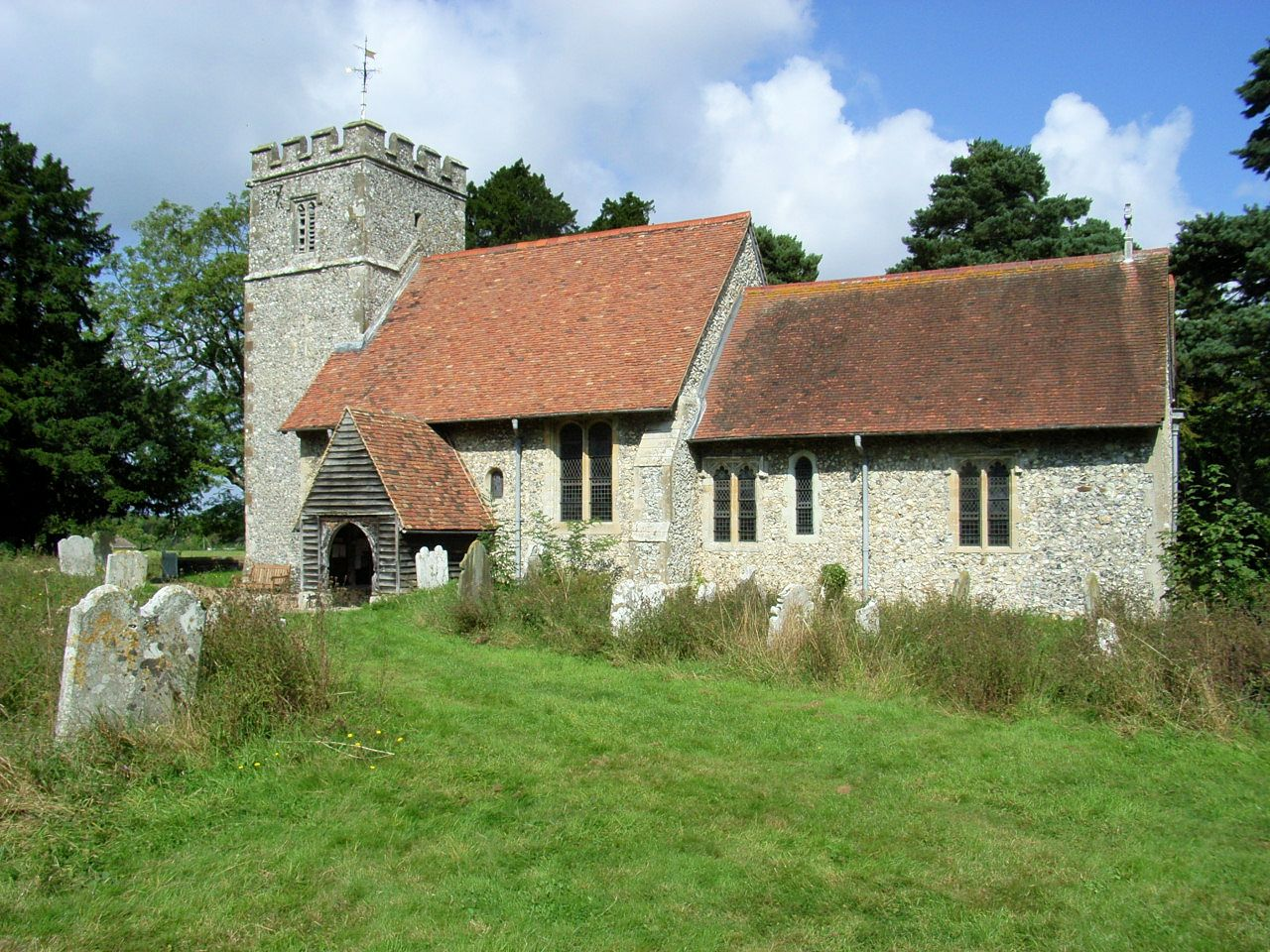
- The south wall of the church
- St. Giles Church, Wormshill
- 51°17′06″N 0°41′50″E
- Denomination: Church of England

History
- Dedication: Saint Giles

Architecture
- Heritage designation: Grade II
- Designated: 26 April 1968

Administration
- Province: Canterbury
- Diocese: Canterbury
- Archdeaconry: Maidstone
- Deanery: Sittingbourne

Clergy
- Vicar: Alan Pinnegar

St Giles Church is the sole church in the village of Wormshill in Kent. The church is Anglican and is dedicated to Saint Giles. It forms part of the united benefice of Tunstall with Bredgar. The other parishes are Milstead, Bicknor and Frinsted and Rodmersham. The ecclesiastical parish of Wormshill is in the Diocese of Canterbury and the Sittingbourne deanery (within the archdeaconry of Maidstone). It is a Grade II listed building, English Heritage number 1060971.

== History ==
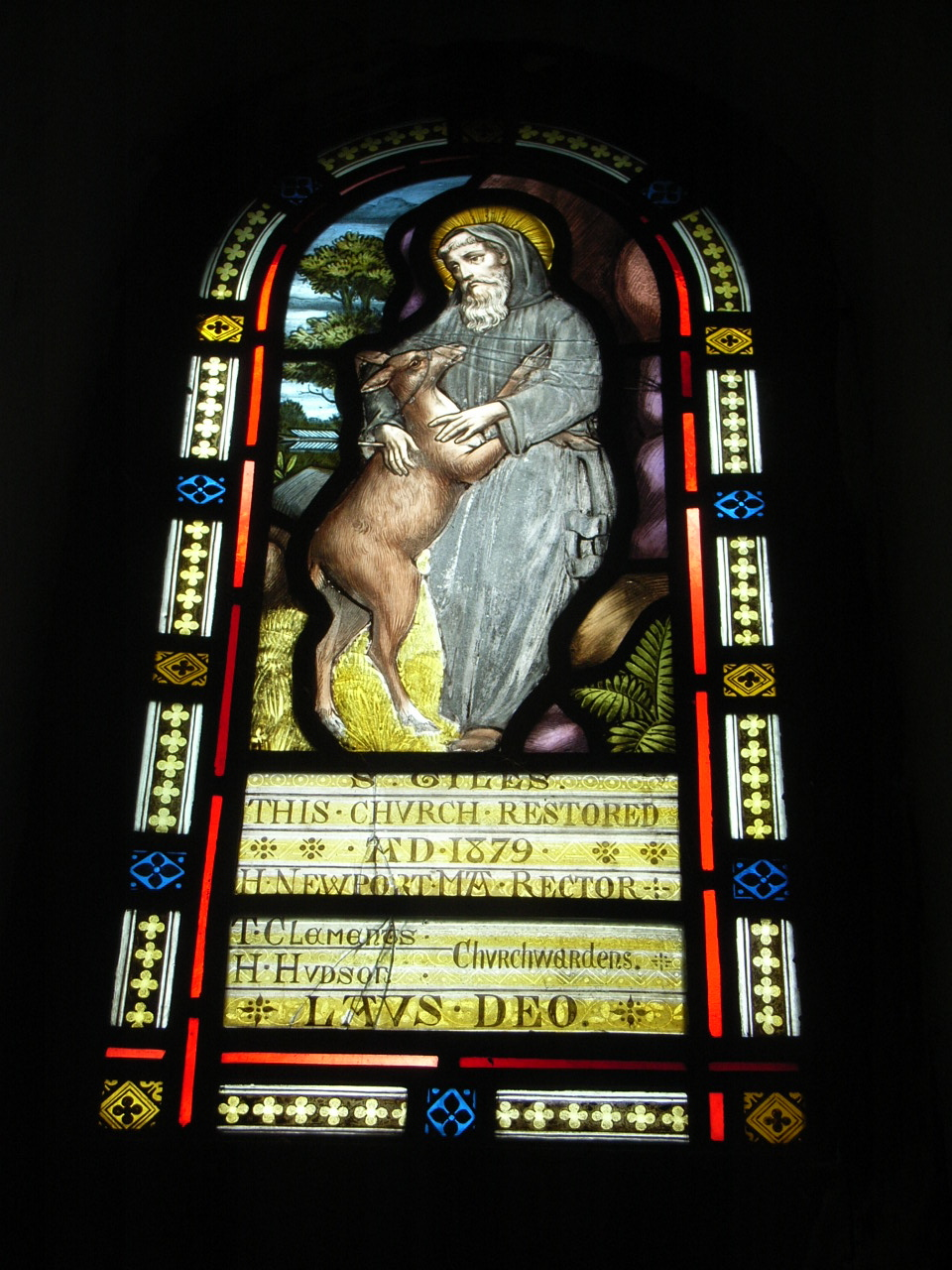
St Giles in stained glass window

The same Hugh holds WORMSHILL of the bishop. It is assessed as 1 sulung. There is land for 2 ploughs. In demesne is 1 [plough]; and 5 villans have 1½ ploughs. There is a church, and 2 slaves, and 2 acres of meadow, and woodland for 10 pigs. TRE and afterwards, as now, worth £4. Edwin held it of King Edward and could go where he wished with his land.

— Domesday Book,

A church existed before the Norman conquest. In 1086 the lack of change in value pre-conquest (TRE (Note: TRE: "Tempus Rex Edwardus", "In the time of King Edward", that is Edward the Confessor c.1004 – 1066.)) to 1086 (as now) may suggest that no major building work had occurred in the intervening 20 years. In the south wall of the nave by the porch is what looks like an Anglo-Saxon double-splayed window. The window had been covered up and was revealed in 1879. Tatton-Brown (1993) states that it is not possible to be certain that it is an Anglo-Saxon window, but it is possible it could be early Norman. The official listing record describes the church as "First half C11, C13 and C15, restored 1879–80 by Clarke" which agrees with Tatton-Brown's earlier date.

The village itself has pagan roots as indicated by the toponymy of the name Wormshill (from the Anglo-Saxon god Wōden). The church appears to have been built, at least in part, by Normans as it displays Norman architectural features. The church also contains a 13th-century chest, first discovered in the early 20th century. The church register dates back to 1700.

In January 2007, the interior of the church, exterior shots of the building and the churchyard and surroundings were used extensively as locations in the filming of an episode of EastEnders broadcast in the United Kingdom over the Easter 2007 holiday season. Mock gravestones together with a temporary Victorian-style street lamp were added to the churchyard by the production crew.

In September 2010, a reward of £500 was offered for the return of a heavy brass altar cross and two brass candlesticks, which had been kept in the church for at least 150 years and were apparently stolen between 12 and 19 September 2010.

== Architecture ==
=== External ===
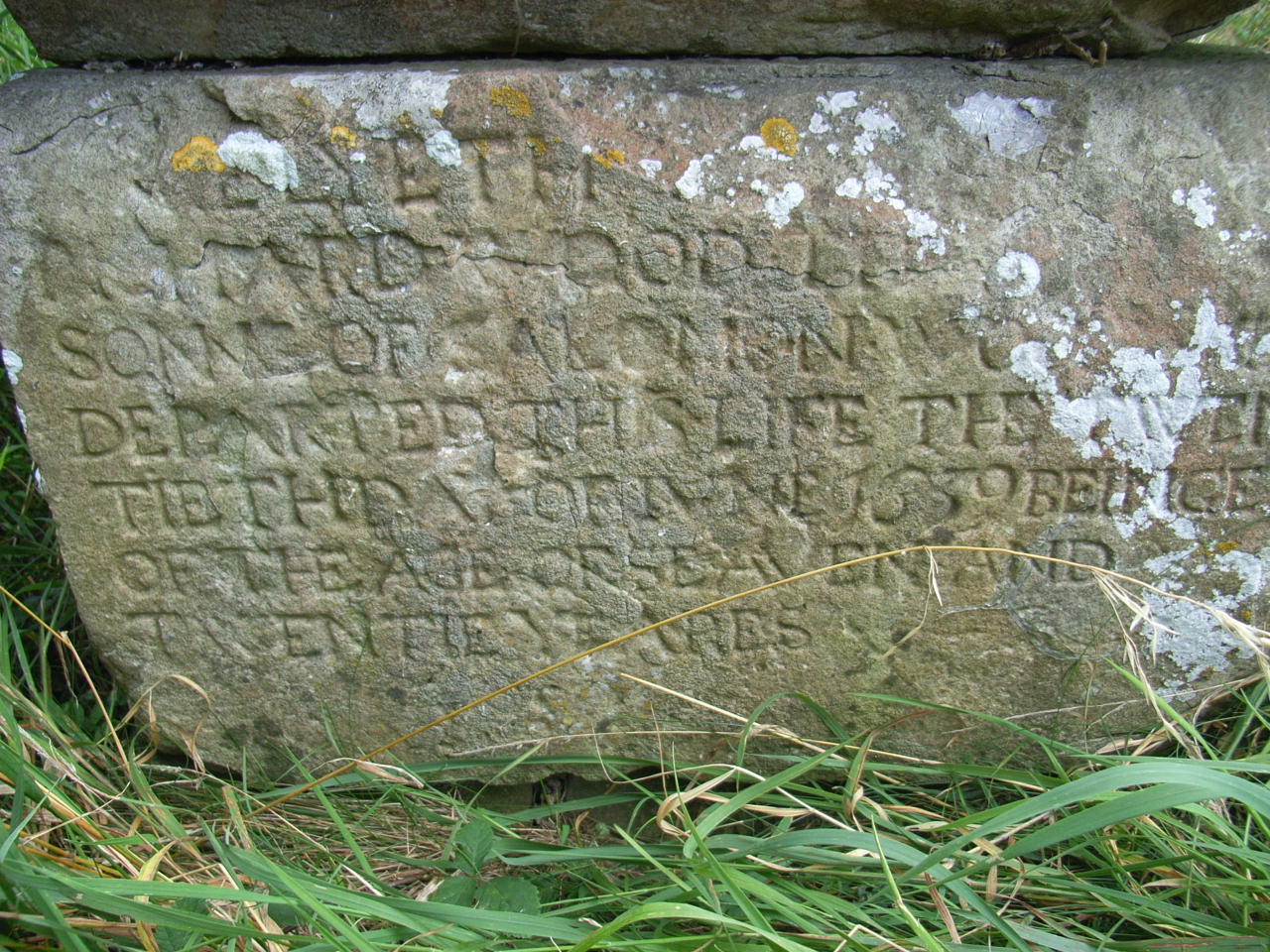
Churchyard gravestone dated 1639

Viewed from the outside the church is uniformly of flint construction with stone dressings. Early dressings were perhaps of Caen stone. During the 13th-century expansion, Reigate Stone and chalk were used; after that Ragstone was employed until the 19th-century repairs which used Bath stone. The roof is tiled with a significant break in outline at the junction of the nave and chancel.

The nave is the oldest part of the church and was built in the early 11th century. It contains the suspected Anglo-Saxon windows, referred to above, which are now filled with a Victorian image of St Giles marking the church's restoration. The nave was extended to the north in the 13th century by the construction of an aisle alongside, the north wall being pieced by an arcade of pointed arches.

The south porch is late 13th or 14th century, authorities disagree. It was repaired later. The construction is weatherboards over a timber frame, the whole supported on a flint base. Within is a 15th-century stoup which before the Reformation would have held holy water for visitors to cross themselves with.

At the time that the nave was extended a West end tower was built. The original tower only extended as far as the first string course, roughly on a level with the top of the nave roof. The base of the tower communicates directly with the nave through a simple pointed arch. Above the arch can be seen a blocked doorway, this gave access to an upper room. Lancet windows illuminated this room, but those to the north and south have been blocked. In the 15th century the upper stage was added which now houses the bells. The eastern face has just a small opening, the other three have two light windows now closed by the louvres for the bells. The parapet is castellated.

As of late 2007, structurally the church is unchanged in at least 200 years, as indicated by a watercolour painted in 1807, and still retains most of its earlier features. However, the church has undergone a number of repairs and restorations, particular in respect to the building's roof, and the rebuilding of the tower and porch in 1903. An Edwardian postcard (as compared with contemporary images) similarly indicates the interior remains relatively untouched.

=== Internal ===
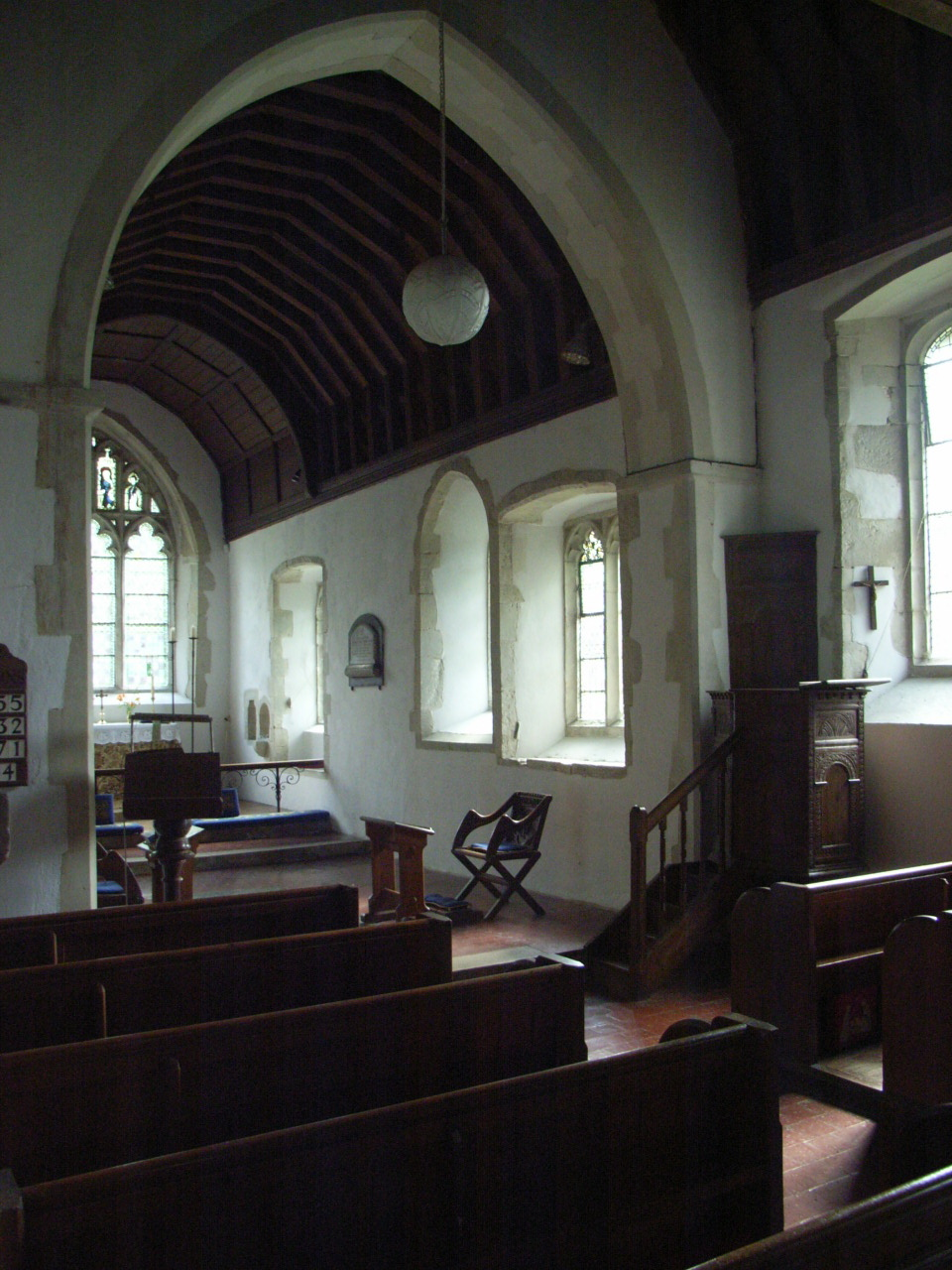
Interior view showing pulpit, ceiling and pews

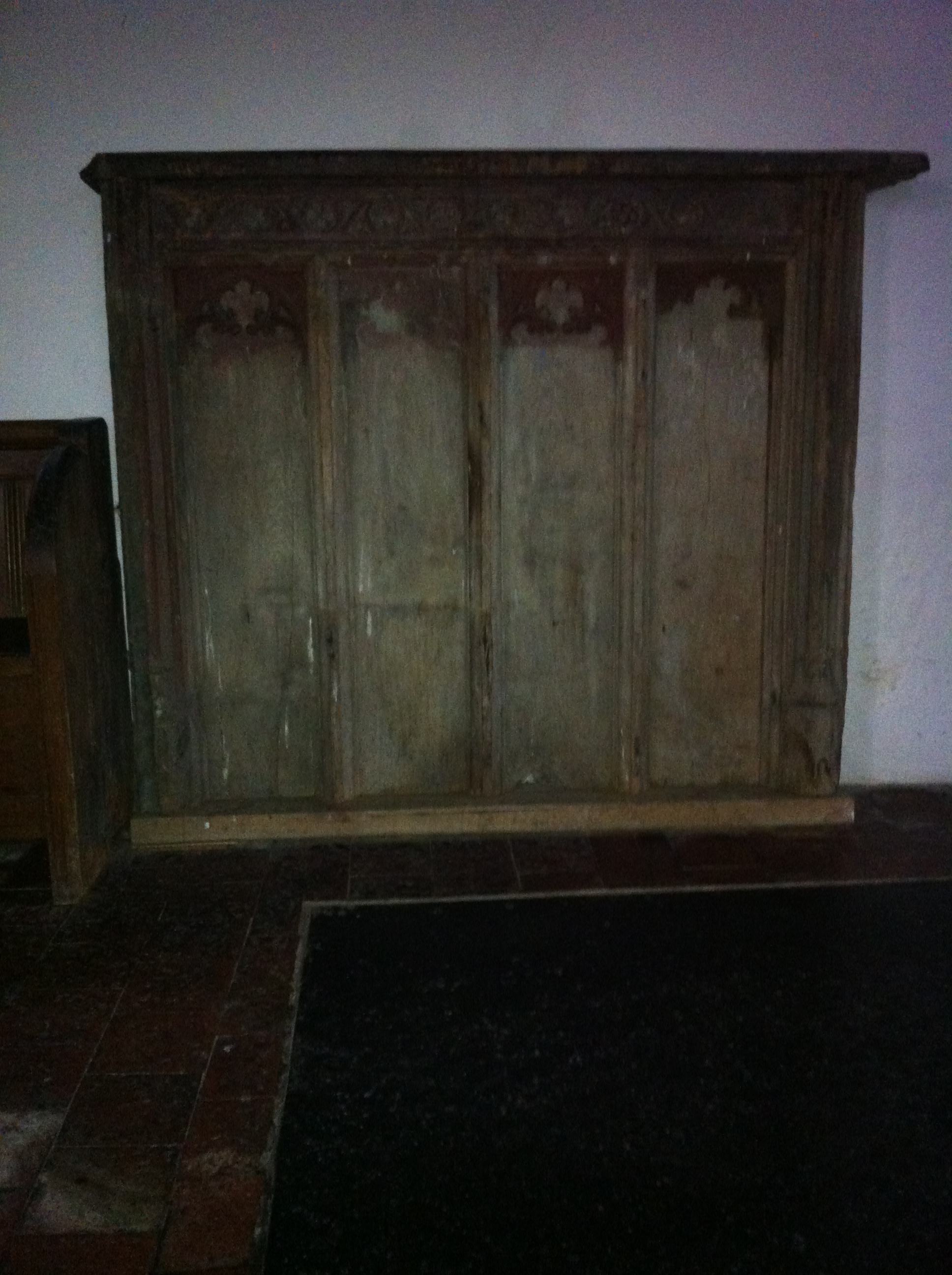
A fragment of the medieval rood screen preserved against the north wall of the north aisle.

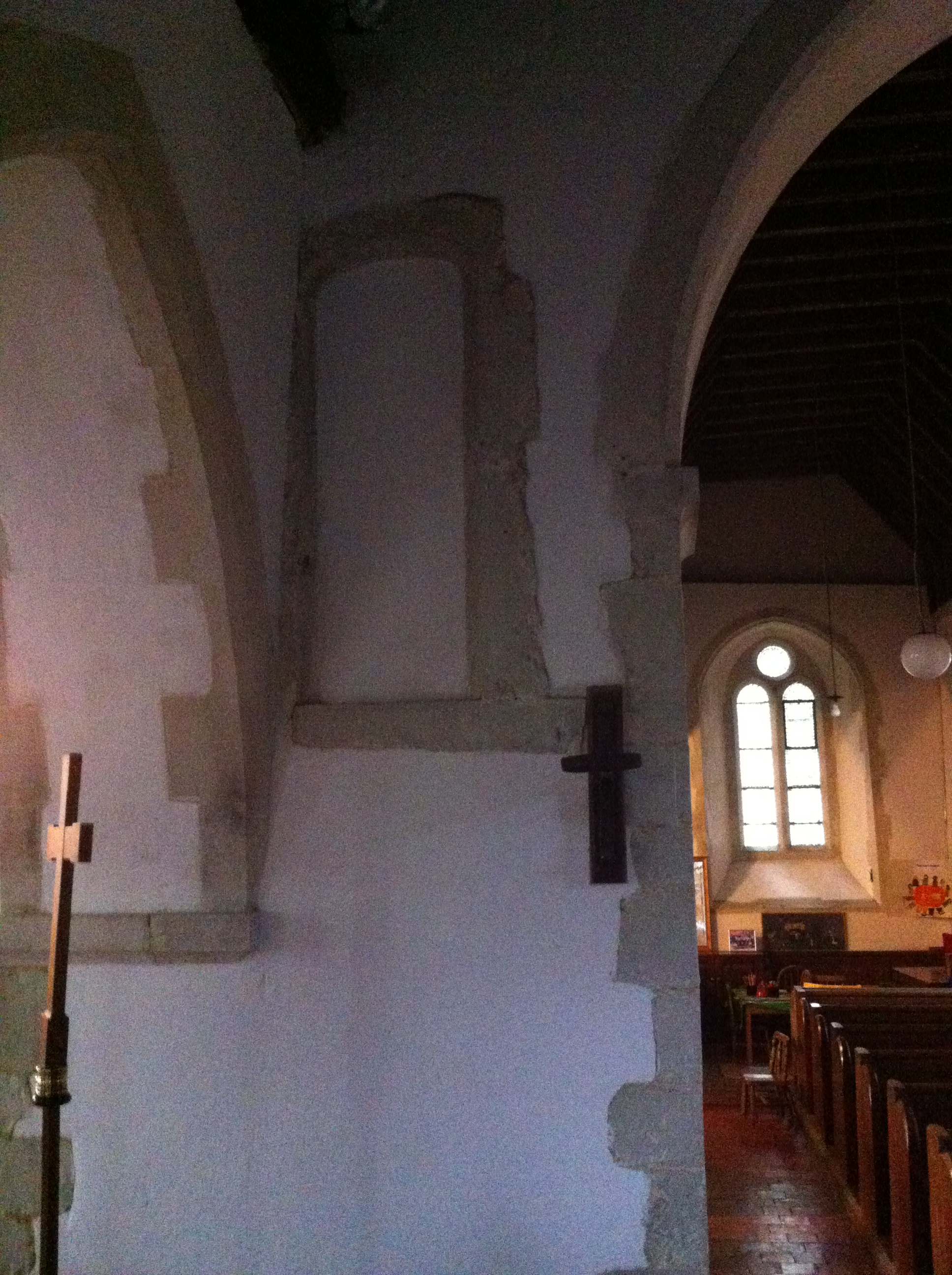
Blocked off doorway in the easternmost nave pier which originally led to the rood loft.

The chancel is 13th century, without a plinth. It is narrower and lower than the nave. The east window is of 15th- or late 14th-century work with later restorations. It shows a flying angle crowning the Virgin Mary with Jesus watching. The chancel arch dates from the 19th-century restoration. There used to be a wooden rood loft at this point which was reached from a stair in the north chancel. The doorway to this is now blocked but is visible from the north chancel. Under the loft was a 14th-century carved oak screen, a portion of which has been placed against the north wall.

Continuing the north aisle of the nave eastwards is the 13th-century north chapel which apparently belonged to the Manor of Wormshill. Whether it was originally the lady chapel is not clear, but later was referred to as such. Close by to the chapel is a late 12th century chest with carved arch decoration.

Major renovations of the church were in 1789 at a cost of £1,200, in 1879 (see below) and again early in the 20th century (1901). The building is constructed from flint in the Early English style.

Following the renovation, prayer boards were commissioned from the village carpenter. They were painted by J Martin of Tenterden and used to hang between the arches on the north wall of the nave. At some point they were moved to the base of the tower

In 1798, Edward Hasted described the church as:

"dedicated to St. Giles, and consists of two isles and two chancels, having a tower steeple at the west end of it. There are remains of good painted glass in the great east window. Several of the family of Tylden lie buried in it. In the church yard are some tombs of the Thatcher's, and for the Woods who resided at Northwood, in this parish and Bicknor."

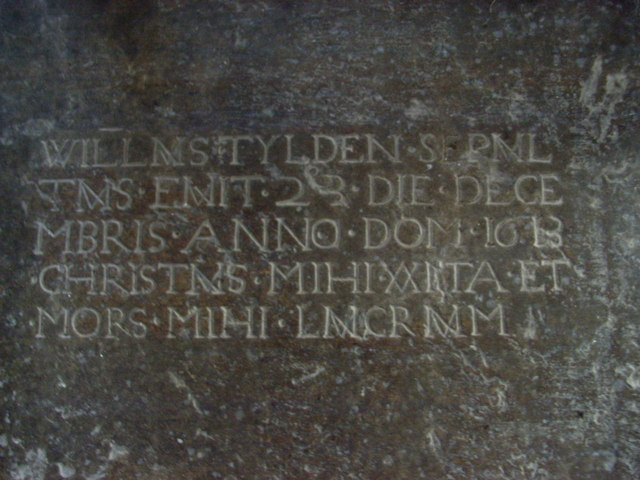
Memorial stone for William Tylden, dated 1613.

The Tyldens were an ancient landholding family in the area for at least three centuries and William Tylden's memorial stone lies set in the floor of the north chancel, showing his date of death as 23 December 1613 Samuel Lewis, in his 1831 Topographical Dictionary of England wrote of a "tower steeple and some fine remains of stained glass in the great east window."

In 1852, Arthur Hussey described the church as having architectural features "certainly of a very early character" and further:

"In Wormshill church the arches, which are pointed, appear to be mere perforations of the wall, the soffits being single, the angles not chamfered, of the thickness of the wall, flat and plain from one side to the other."

In 1851 the church was said to have seating capacity of "140" with "afternoon attendance: 82" and, in 1879, architect Joseph Clarke undertook further restoration work. This work was commemorated by the addition of a new stained glass window, in the possible Saxon opening, dedicated to Saint Giles which bears the date of the restoration (1879) as well as the name of the vicar, "H. Newport" and church wardens Tom Clements (who was at one time the village postmaster) and "H. Hudson".

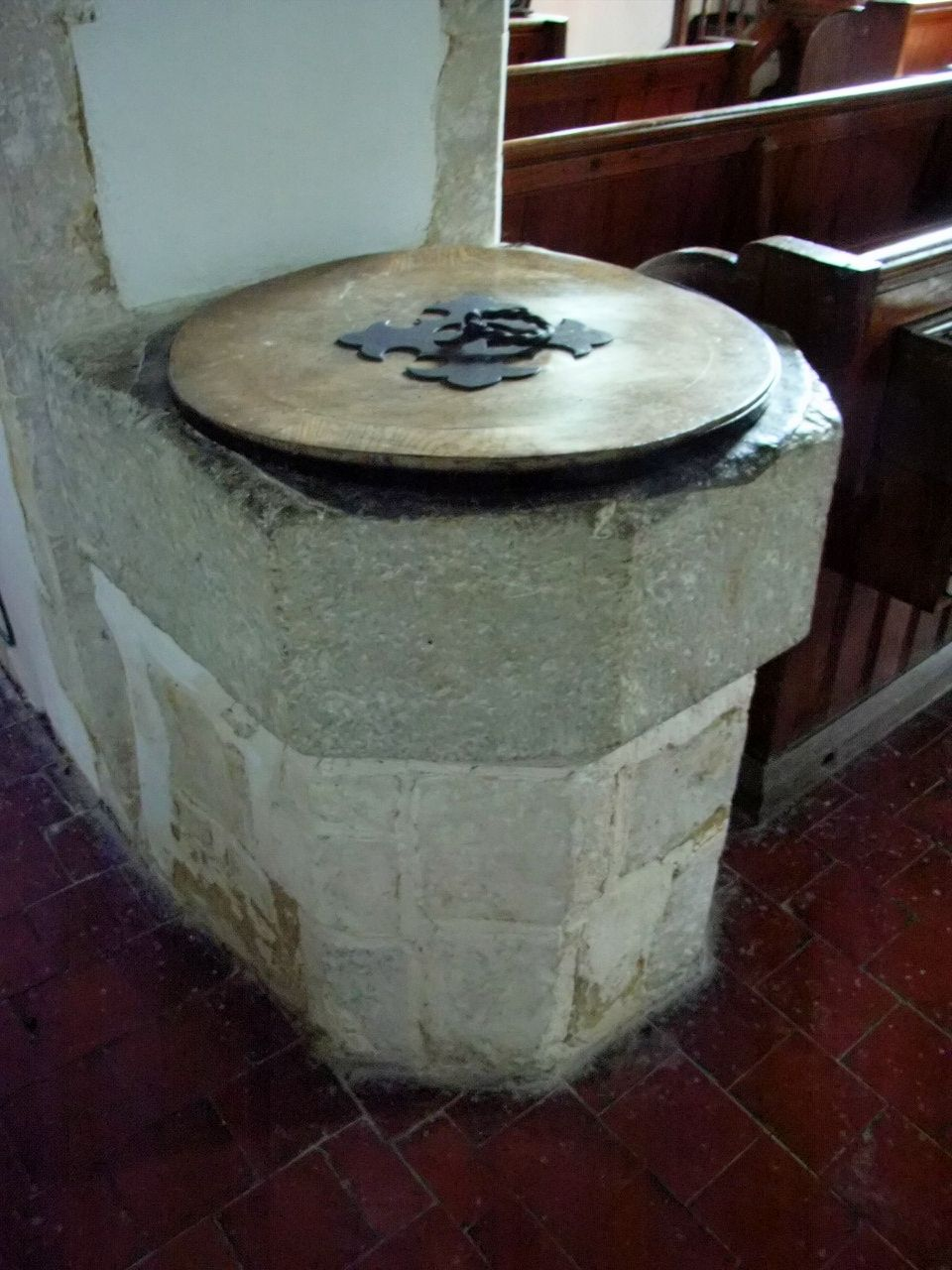
Baptismal font

The font within the church is from the Norman era, possibly even Saxon. The pulpit was described by the Sittingbourne, Milton, and District Directory 1908/09 as Tudor period but other authorities have described it as Jacobean. It is hexagonal with a sounding board behind. The front panels and sounding board carry incised decoration.

A stained glass window dated 1879 in a small opening in the south wall depicts St Giles, holding a stricken deer, in keeping with the saint's story. Further stained glass includes the Northwood coat of arms, dedicated to a former landholding family in the parish.

== Music ==
=== Organ ===
The organ is an 18th-century chamber organ. It was obtained from a church in Brighton.

=== Bells ===
The church has a ring of six bells which are notable both for the lightness of the ring and the story of their restoration. In 1944 a 16-year-old resident, Michael Nightingale, opened a Post Office savings account entitled the "Wormshill Bell Fund" by paying in ten shillings. He invited Albert Hughes from Mears & Stainbank to inspect the tower with a view to replacing the bells with a ring of six. He tells of Mr Hughes’ surprise at being met at Sittingbourne Railway Station by a youth rather than the somewhat older gentlemen he was used to dealing with! Fifty years later he completed the full ring of six bells - one of which was original and five were rescued from abandoned churches.

The oldest bell in the ring was cast as the original number 2 in 1718 by Richard Phelps. In 1731 Samuel Smith II of York cast three bells for West Bretton, Yorkshire and C & G Mears cast three bells for St Gregory the Great and Canterbury in 1851. At Wormshill the treble and tenor were replaced by two steel bells in 1863. Naylor Vickers carried out the work for free, the value of the old bell metal being enough to pay for the new steel bells. However, barely twenty years later in 1885 the tower was deemed unsafe and ringing had to stop. At some point the old number 3 bell appears to have been replaced by a steel bell. All four bells were cracked by clocking, that is pulling the clapper against the bell over by a rope.

Shortly after Hughes' visit in 1944 the three steel bells were scrapped leaving just the old number 2. In 1963 the three 1851 bells of St Gregory's were recast by Mears & Stainbank. By 1988 sufficient funds had accumulated so that the remaining 1718 bell could be welded. A new bell frame was designed and built for six bells, the one remaining bell being hung as the new number six. The new frame was installed at the level of the former first floor tower room. The west window was replaced by louvres, so two levels of louvres are visible from the road. The three St Gregory bells were obtained (St Gregory's was now redundant) and hung as numbers 1 to 3. Although the four bells were not tuned as a diatonic scale (C#, B, A and E), three full peals were rung on them.

In 1995 the three 1731 bells from West Bretton were obtained. The West Bretton 1 and 2 were hung as Wormshill 4 and 5. Nightingale's dream of fifty years earlier finally came true on 8 October 1995 when the bells were dedicated by the Bishop of Rochester, the Right Reverend David Say. In 2010 the 1 long cwt 9 lb (121 lb or 55 kg) treble was recast as the present 1 long cwt 2 qr 5 lb (173 lb or 78 kg) by the Whitechapel Foundry.

The present ring has the second lightest tenor of any six in the County of Kent (3 long cwt 1 qr 15 lb; 379 lb or 172 kg) and the combined weight of the bells is the lightest six in the county (12 long cwt 3 qr 16 lb; 1,444 lb or 655 kg).

== Rectory ==
The current rector is the Reverend Alan Pinnegar. A rector at the Rectory of Wormshill in the 19th century, Reverend Josiah Disturnell, was the subject of a debate as to early examples of exceptional "human longevity" when he was cited as being 107 years old when he died. References to the rector's memorial stone in the church were ultimately provided as evidence of his actual age of death, being either "91 or 93".

The former rectory house (or vicarage) is now a private dwelling.
