= Wormshill =

Village and civil parish in Kent, England

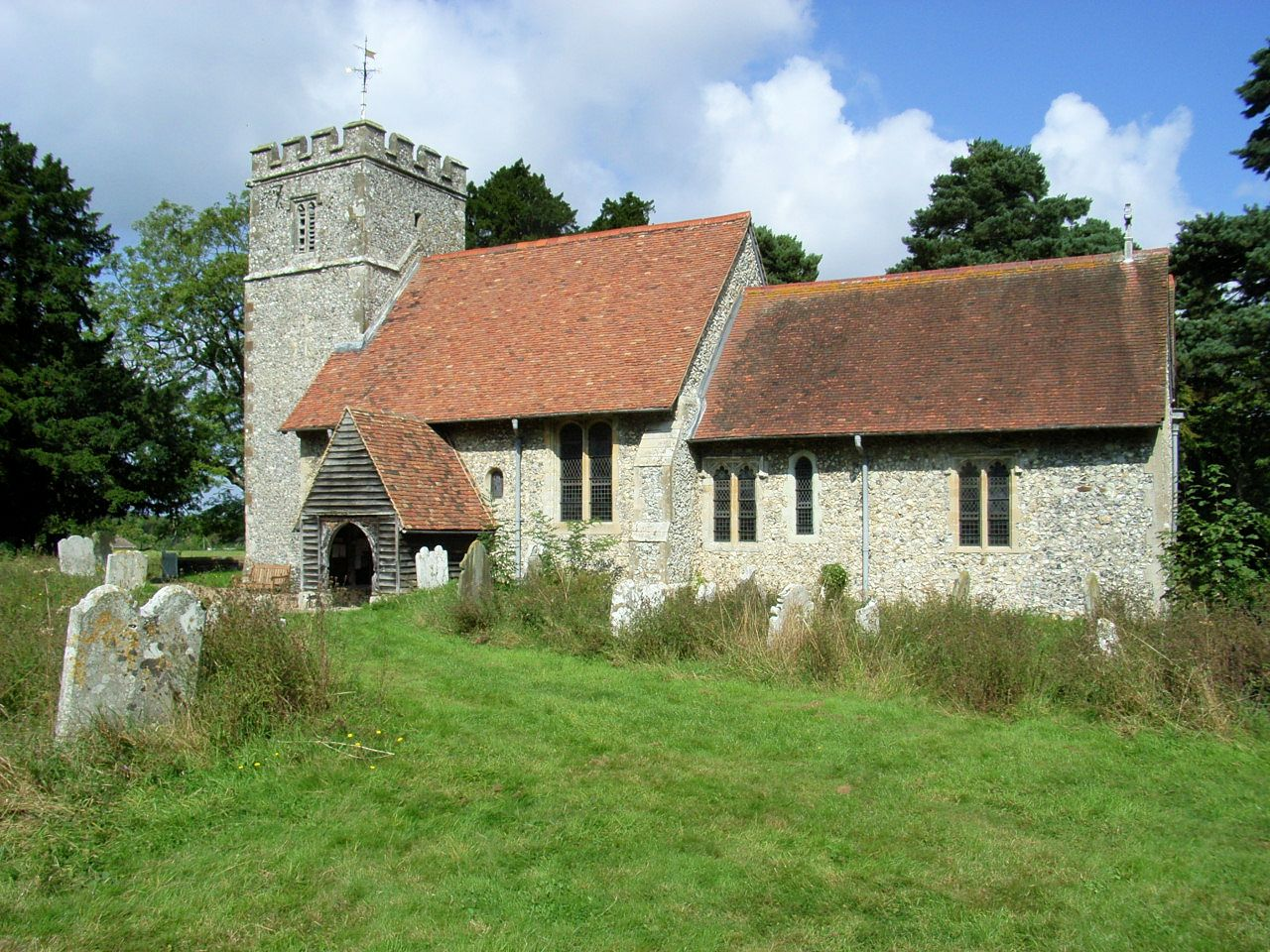
- St Giles’ Church, Wormshill

- Location within Kent
- Population: 201 (2011 Census)
- OS grid reference: TQ879574
  - London: 38 mi (61 km)
- District: Maidstone
- Shire county: Kent
- Region: South East
- Country: England
- Sovereign state: United Kingdom
- Post town: SITTINGBOURNE
- Postcode district: ME9
- Dialling code: 01622
- Police: Kent
- Fire: Kent
- Ambulance: South East Coast
- UK Parliament: Faversham and Mid Kent

Wormshill (/wɜːrmzˈhɪl/ wurmz-HIL), historically Wormsell, is a small village and civil parish within the Borough of Maidstone, Kent, England. The parish is approximately 7 miles (11 km) south of the Swale and 8 mi (13 km) east of Maidstone. The village of Frinsted lies 0.6 mi (1 km) to the east and Bicknor 1 1/2 miles (2.4 km) to the north-west; while Hollingbourne is 3 mi (5 km) to the south-west. The village lies on an exposed high point of the North Downs, within the Kent Downs Area of Outstanding Natural Beauty.

Archaeological and toponymic evidence of Wormshill's existence predates its appearance in the Domesday Book of 1086. The village contains a number of heritage-listed buildings, which include a Norman church, a public house and one of the oldest surviving post office buildings in the United Kingdom. The fields and woodland surrounding Wormshill have changed little in the past 500 years, and the village itself remains rural with a low population density compared to the national average. The population of 200 is a mixture of agricultural workers employed by local farms, and professional residents who commute to nearby towns.

== History ==
=== Toponymy ===
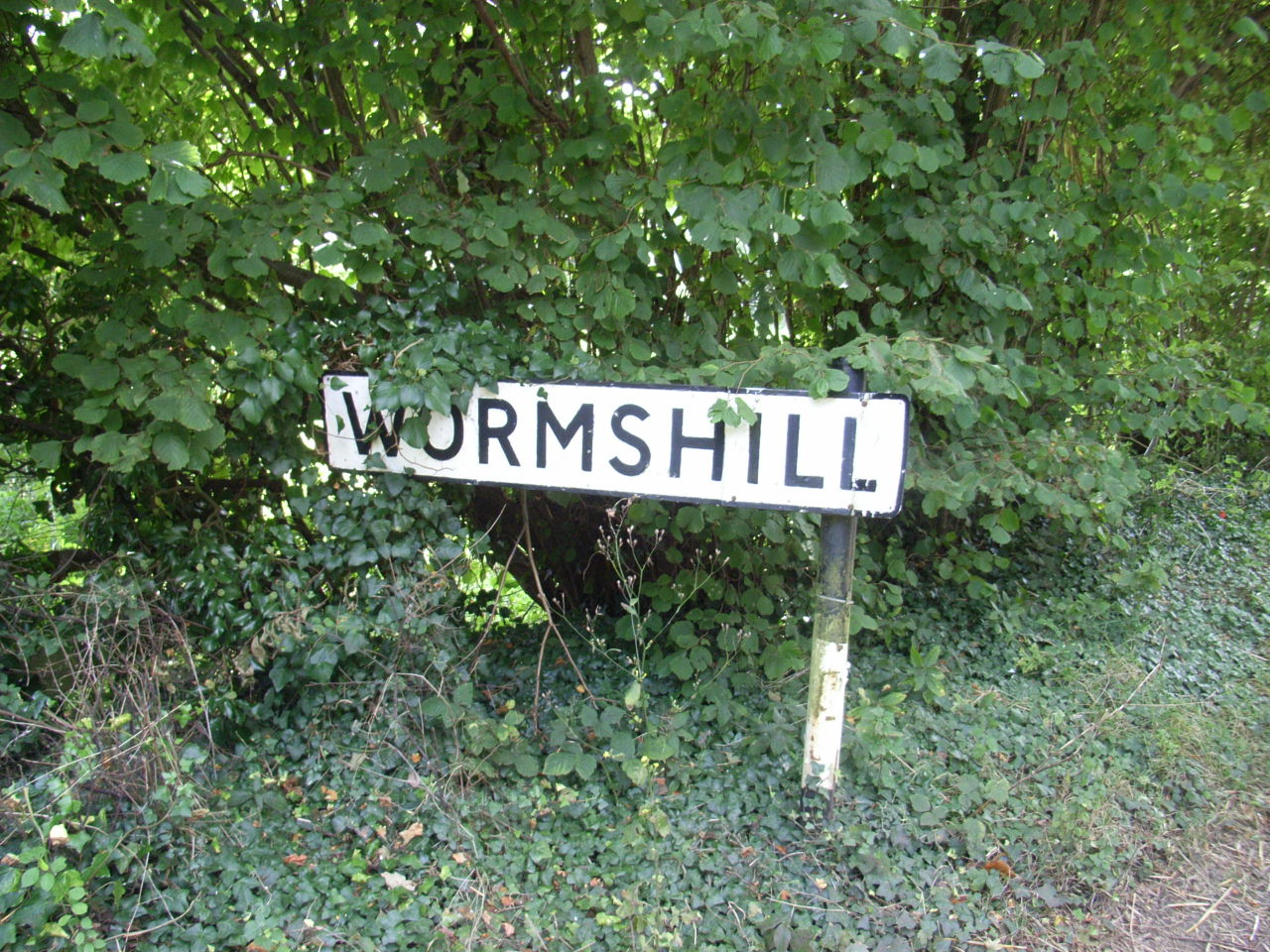
Road sign with the village's name

Wormshill was listed under the name Godeselle in the Domesday Book of 1086. The village is thought to be much older, its name deriving from the Anglo-Saxon god Wōden (a cognate with the Norse god, Odin) and meaning "Woden's Hill". The area was also described in a paper in Archaeologia Cantiana, 1961, as "Wormshill, an ancient possession of the Kings of Kent, the hill where they worshipped the heathen Woden". The University of Nottingham's Institute for Name-Studies has offered the suggestion that the name means "shelter for a herd of pigs".

The Latinised form, Wornesell, appears in the Kent Hundred Rolls of 1274–75 and in a mediaeval will recorded in September 1409. A corruption of the name, Wormsell, is mentioned as the birthplace of a Cistercian abbot at the nearby Boxley Abbey in 1474; a further variant, Wormysell, is found in a will of 1487, and court papers concerning a land dispute in 1534 use the name Wormeshell.

=== Early history ===
A 1994 landscape survey identified woodland to the north of the village as having contained ancient flint tools and what appeared to be flint boundary markers, the latter apparently gathered from loose-lying surface flints. The area around the village features ancient deneholes, or agricultural chalk mines, some of which are pre-Roman. These holes, which may be up to 30 metres (98 ft) deep, were often dug at the edges of fields, onto which the chalk marl would be spread. A Lower Palaeolithic (Acheulian) hand axe was unearthed in the garden of Blacksmiths cottage in the village. In 1966, the remains of a U-shaped mediaeval pastoral enclosure for controlling the movement of stock were recorded in woodland to the north of the village. The extensive woodland in the parish also meant that it was one of several sources of wooden planking for the piers of Rochester Bridge (16 mi (26 km) away) from the early 11th century (and theoretically was still liable to do so until the passing of the Rochester Bridge Act 1908.

The parish of Wormshill was originally appended to the village and parish of Boughton Malherbe, since both had the same patron; the patron of a parish was the land-owner who often built the church on the estate and who had the right (known as advowson) to appoint the parish priest. The first recorded patron of Wormshill was Robert de Gatton, who owned the Manor of Wormsell during the reign of Henry III (1207–72). From the Gatton family, the village passed by marriage in the 13th century to Sir Simon de Northwood, whose coat of arms appears in the stained glass of St Giles, the village's only church, and whose name (Norwood) is given to the farm at the north of the village.

Patronage of the parish subsequently transferred through a number of landholding families, vesting by the 17th century with the prominent Kent family of Sir Charles Sedley, which at times held the barony of Aylesford. During this period the Tylden (or Tilden) family, believed to have had links to the Crusades of Richard I, were also significant landholders in the area in the early 17th century; a memorial to William Tylden, who died in 1613, rests in the north chancel of St Giles church. Around the same time in the late 16th century, recruits of Sir Francis Drake's navy may have used a track, now known as Drake Lane, in the south west of the parish or camped nearby as they marched from the Weald of Kent to the dockyards at Sheerness.

Patronage is believed to have lapsed from the Sedley family to the Archbishop of Canterbury and then to Sir Joseph Aylosse before being conveyed by gift from a Mr. Serjeant Moses to the charity of the president and governors of Christ's Hospital in London in gratitude for a University of Cambridge scholarship he had received. As late as 1798 the parish was still paying its traditional castle-guard rent to Dover Castle and retained a court baron; this fee was a substitute for a feudal obligation requiring the provision of knights to defend the castle.

Little (if any) information exists about the village's population or demographics before 1801; however evidence from the first census indicates that the village grew steadily, reaching a peak in 1871. A possible indication of the growth in the agricultural output of the village is the construction of two windmills (possibly used for the production of oil from linseed or rapeseed) marked at "Beddington" (present-day Bedmonton) on Ordnance Survey drawings dated 1797 and an Ordnance Survey map published between 1819 and 1843. The mills stood north and south of each other and were approximately 1/2 mile (800 m) to the north-west of the church. House building continued during the mid-to-late 19th century, together with a post office and school. Like much of rural Kent during the time of the Swing Riots (1830), Wormshill experienced a degree of civil unrest and Home Office records indicate that "a large body of men, numbering 50-100" assembled at Wormshill with the purpose of "intimidation and to enforce demands on farmers ... inducing other labourers to join them".

=== 20th century ===
Aerial view of The Street taken on 16 April 1948. The rectory is in the foreground.

Records indicate that at least one former resident of the village fought as part of the Australian contingent in the Gallipoli Campaign of the First World War. Private Frederick George Kite, born at Wormshill on 16 February 1894, and educated at Wormshill and Milstead, enlisted on 8 September 1915. Originally employed as a fireman, after training at Blackboy and Broadmeadows camps in Victoria, he sailed from Melbourne as part of the Australian Imperial Force, 16th Infantry Battalion aboard HMAT Ceramic A40 on 23 December 1914. He participated in the landing at Gallipoli and was wounded in the left arm and shoulder, ending his active service.

During the Second World War, Wormshill joined a number of similar settlements in the region to form part of the anti-invasion network. On the outskirts of the village, near the hamlet of Ringlestone, there are the remains of a zero station (or Operational Base), a secret underground communications relay post operated by Auxiliary Units of the British Home Guard. In the event of a German invasion the zero station was to be used by defending forces to receive and transmit coded messages between a series of similar stations in the area as well as to the operational command headquarters at Hannington Hall in Wiltshire. A concealed underground concrete bunker, it was designed to be invisible from the surface and is located in woodland about 140 m (150 yd) from the road. Although its primary purpose was a communications post, the zero station was also designed to hold ammunition and explosives and provide living quarters for the radio equipment operators. Anecdotal evidence also indicates that anti-aircraft guns were sited near the village and that a Bren gun emplacement was installed in the valley between Wormshill and Frinsted.

A Diver Battery was located to the southwest of the village. Forming part of the Kentish Gun Belt, designed to provide a defence to attacks by V-1 flying bombs or "doodlebugs", it was armed with eight mobile 3.7-inch guns, and manned by 424 Battery of 138 Regiment of the 40th Anti Aircraft Brigade. It was initially equipped with Predictor AA No.10 and No.3 Mark V radar, and was manned by 57 Brigade in July 1944. There are records of a V-1 being shot down by a Supermarine Spitfire to the west of the village. Flt Lt A. R. Cruikshank is reported as having "Sited a Diver north of Ashford and attacked from astern at 100 yards range. Saw strikes and Diver fell and exploded in a field".

Villagers resident during the war also recall a V-1 being shot down in orchards near Norwood Farm and a fighter aircraft crashing in fields to the south of Yew Tree Farm. Roadside checkpoints were set up on the main routes into the village to the north and south and Allied forces moving through the region camped overnight in the area, including a detachment of New Zealand troops in fields near Home Farm.

Following an initial decline in the population at the beginning of the 20th century, more houses were constructed between the Great War and the Second World War and again in the 1950s and 1960s, adding to the cluster of cottages from the 19th century and earlier.

== Governance ==
At the time of the Kent Hundred Rolls in 1275, Wormshill was in the Hundred of Eyhorne, a regional sub-division used in the Middle Ages by feudal and crown officials to administer communities. Although the Hundred of Eyhorne (including Wormshill) still exists, it is a mediaeval anachronism and no longer has any practical or administrative significance. In the 19th century, the village was within the lathe of Aylesford, the Bearsted petty sessional division and the Hollingbourne Rural District. The village was also incorporated into the Hollingbourne Poor Law Union (a means of funding and administering the operation of the Poor Laws in the area). The parish of Wormshill in part sits astride the West Kent and East Kent divide, a demarcation which until 1814 applied to an administrative boundary for the purposes of the law courts' Quarter Sessions. According to Edward Hasted (writing in 1798): "northward of the church, including the borough of Bedmanton, is in the division of East Kent, but the rest of it, including the church and village, is in that of West Kent". This differs from the traditional distinction between Men of Kent and Kentish Men, which are separated by the River Medway, accordingly persons born in Wormshill would be Men of Kent.

Since 1975, Wormshill has been administered within the North Downs ward and, together with surrounding communities, elects a representative councillor for the ward in the Borough of Maidstone. The village forms the central focus of the civil and church parishes of Wormshill.

Wormshill is part of the parliamentary constituency of Faversham and Mid Kent, whose Member of Parliament is Helen Whately of the Conservative Party. Prior to Brexit in 2020, it was in the South East England constituency in the European Parliament.

== Geography ==
At 51°17′04″N 0°41′44″E, the village is in central Kent, approximately 38 mi (61 km) south-east of London. The nearest town is Sittingbourne, 4 mi (6 km) to the north. Wormshill is surrounded by villages and hamlets of a similar size, including Frinsted, Bicknor, Bedmonton and Hucking.

The village is on a high point of the North Downs. The nearby road intersection of Black Post is recorded on the Ordnance Survey maps at 191 m (627 ft) above sea level. The landscape is primarily characterised by undulating calcareous grassland and ancient deciduous woodland over chalk downland. The settlement itself (as opposed to the wider parish) is on a downland ridge between two shallow dip slope valleys that separate it from Bicknor to the north-west and Frinsted to the east.

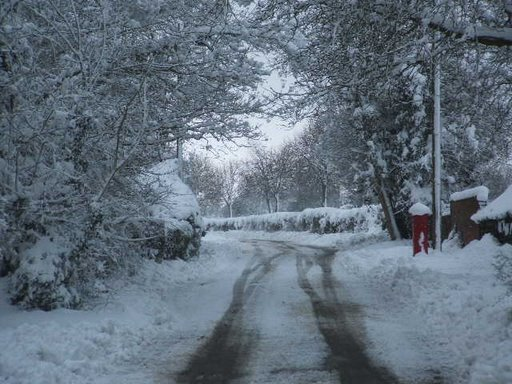
View north up The Street after the unusual heavy snowfall of March 2005

Wormshill's elevated and exposed position on the North Downs means it occasionally experiences extreme weather conditions such as the heavy snowfalls of 11–14 January 1987, March 2005, February 2009 and January 2010. In the late 18th century Hasted commented: "Being exposed to the northern aspect, it lies very bleak and cold."

Much of the local woodland was devastated by the Great Storm of 1987, which in October swept across south-east England with hurricane-force winds. A significant part of the exposed woodland to the north-east of Wormshill was felled and, after replanting, has only recently shown signs of maturing. An ancient yew tree believed to have stood for several hundred years in the grounds of the house at Norwood Farm was destroyed along with other long-standing trees. However, some 38 years later, the village displays few obvious signs of the damage.

The countryside around the village has been described as "an area where the whole landscape is a piece of history—a valley where time has stood still and the pattern of woods and fields is much as it was 500 years ago". A designated ancient woodland lies to the north-west of the village. Predominantly centred on Barrows Wood but also including High Wood and Trundle Wood, this is likely a remnant of the woodland described by Hasted: "... at the northern boundary of the parish there is a considerable quantity of wood, consisting mostly of hazel and oak, with numbers of trees of the latter, interspersed among them, which are but small, never here growing to any size." An ancient track that passes through the remnants of this woodland has been damaged by the use of off-road vehicles leading to attempts by local landowners to block Drake Lane, a byway that runs through Drake Lane Wood in the south-west of the parish and which may have been used by recruits of Sir Francis Drake's navy. Deep water-logged ruts in the track have resulted in the partial resurfacing of the route.

The village stretches primarily along a single carriageway road known as The Street. The north-eastern end of The Street is a designated Conservation Area. The lack of development stems from its position within the Kent Downs Area of Outstanding Natural Beauty (AONB) and a Site of Nature Conservation Interest, which influences local planning laws and limits permission to build new housing. All development is subject to a high level of scrutiny; any development that would adversely affect the natural beauty of the landscape will automatically be resisted, and large-scale development proposals must be accompanied by an environmental impact assessment. The last major development was that of the residential cul-de-sac Draysfield.

== Demography ==
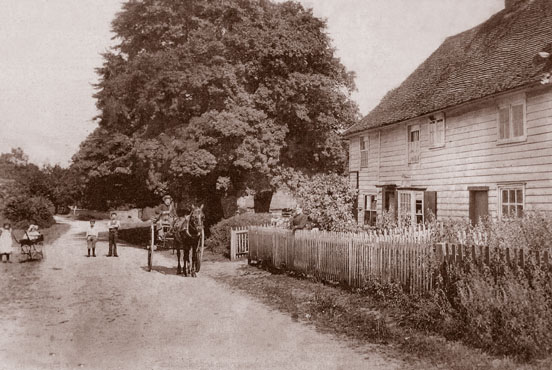
Looking south on The Street in the late 19th century. The old post office still stands in the village.

The record in the Domesday Book does not give the population in 1086, though several people are named. By the late 19th century the village and parish were described as:

WORMSHILL, a parish in Hollingbourn [sic] district, Kent; 5 miles S by W of Sittingbourne r. station. It has a post-office under Sittingbourne. Acres, 1,467. Real property, £1,295. Pop., 253. Houses, 46. The property is divided among a few. The living is a rectory in the diocese of Canterbury. Value, £260.*Patron, Christ's Hospital, London. The church is plain. Charities, £12.

Wormshill's location remains rural. Because of geography and restrictions on development, building in the village has been scant since the 1960s and 1970s. In 1821, the parish contained only 26 dwellings: by 2001, the total number of houses had risen to 82.

The rural nature of the area is indicated by a population density of approximately 0.4 persons per hectare (1 person for every 6.9 acres), compared to the average for the south-east of England of 4.2 persons per hectare (1 person for every 0.6 acres).

The village has been recorded as a distinct parish unit for the purpose of census statistics since the first United Kingdom census in 1801. The majority of the official population of 198 (per United Kingdom Census 2001) is aged 45 or over and lives in homes comprising married family units. The total population has increased by around 40 people since 1801 however, during the past 200 years, it has fluctuated more widely within that range. In 1801 the population was 157 before peaking at 253 in 1861. In 1901 census records indicate a parish population of either 163 or 169.

Data for the ethnicity of the wider Maidstone area show that the population is around 97 per cent white and that the remainder is of mixed, black, and Asian descent. Specific figures for Wormshill held by Kent County Council indicated in 2001 that all the villagers were of white ethnicity.

Population of Wormshill
| Year | 1801 | 1811 | 1821 | 1831 | 1841 | 1851 | 1861 | 1871 | 1881 | 1891 |
|---|---|---|---|---|---|---|---|---|---|---|
| Population | 157 | 160 | 165 | 187 | 218 | 209 | 253 | 251 | 213 | 160 |
| Year | 1901 | 1911 | 1921 | 1931 | 1941 | 1951 | 1961 | 1971 | 1981 | 1991 |
| Population | 169 | 137 | 157 | 178 | n/a | 151 | 214 | 184 | ? | ? |
| Year | 2001 | | | | | | | | | |
| Population | 198 | | | | | | | | | |

== Economy ==
Wormshill includes two farms: Yew Tree Farm (dairy farming) at the south end of the village, and Norwood Farm (fruit and other crops) at the north end. A third farm, Home Farm appeared on late 19th and early 20th centuries Ordnance Survey maps in the centre of the village. This farm is no longer in use, but some outbuildings remain. Wormshill at one time included a blacksmith's shop, which is recorded on Ordnance Survey maps until 1898. According to the 1831 Census, 40 of the 48 adult males in the village were employed in the agricultural sector. Census records from the mid-to-late 19th century show a marked increase in the construction of new homes, representing the largest growth in the village for the next 100 years; however, the 1901 Census still described the majority of workers as "labourers and servants". The population spike between 1821 and 1901 is a trend typical to the general growth in the need for physical labour from parishes in the Kent downland agricultural region in the 19th century which was followed in the early 20th century by the increasing mechanisation of farming activity. Although the farms continue to employ from the village, as of 2008 Wormshill is largely a dormitory village, with residents employed in nearby towns or commuting to London. The socio-economic classification of Census 2001 indicated that the most common occupations were "lower managerial and professional occupations" (21.9 per cent) and "small employers and own account workers" (15.2 per cent).

== Landmarks ==
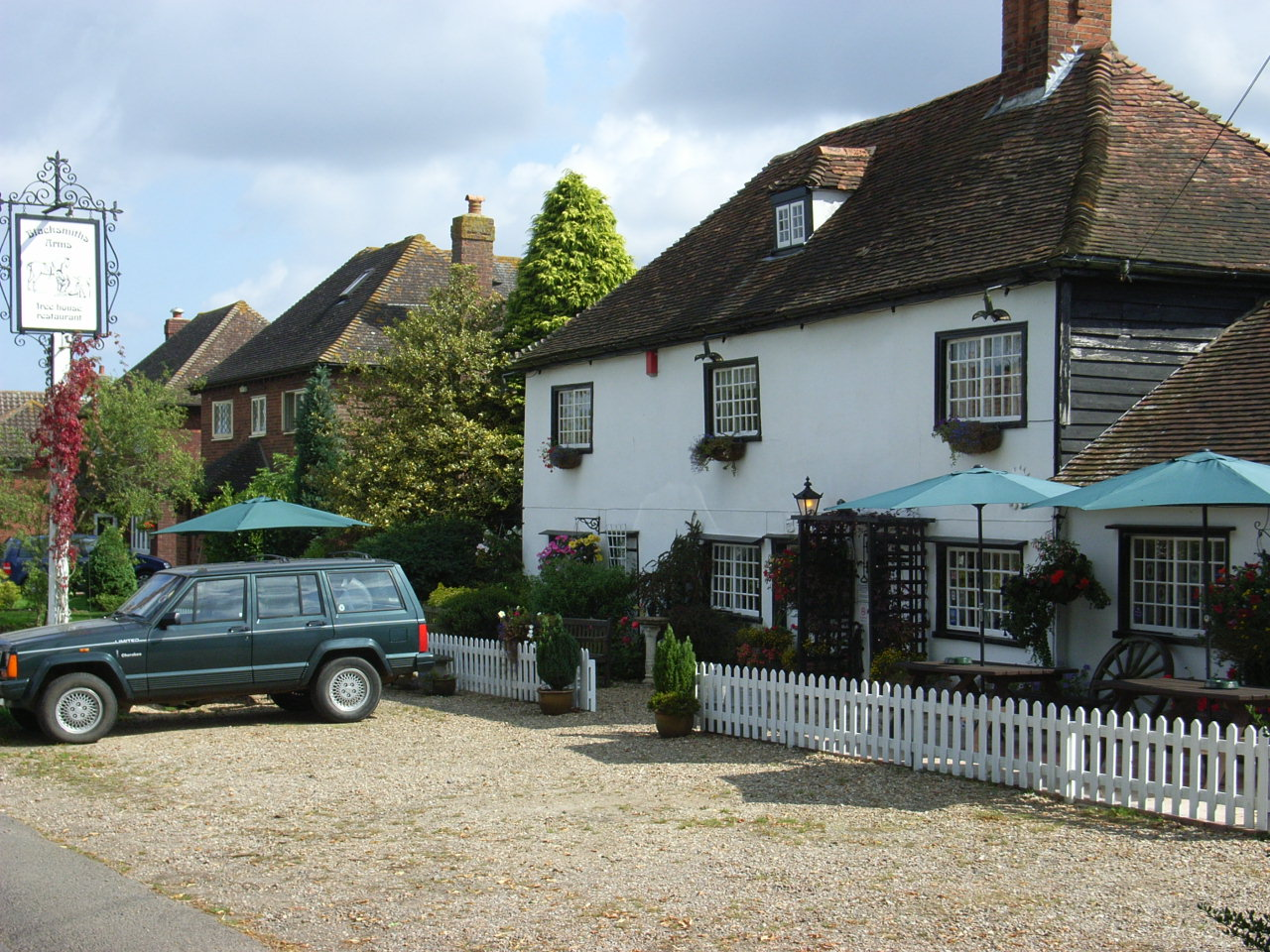
Blacksmith's Arms public house

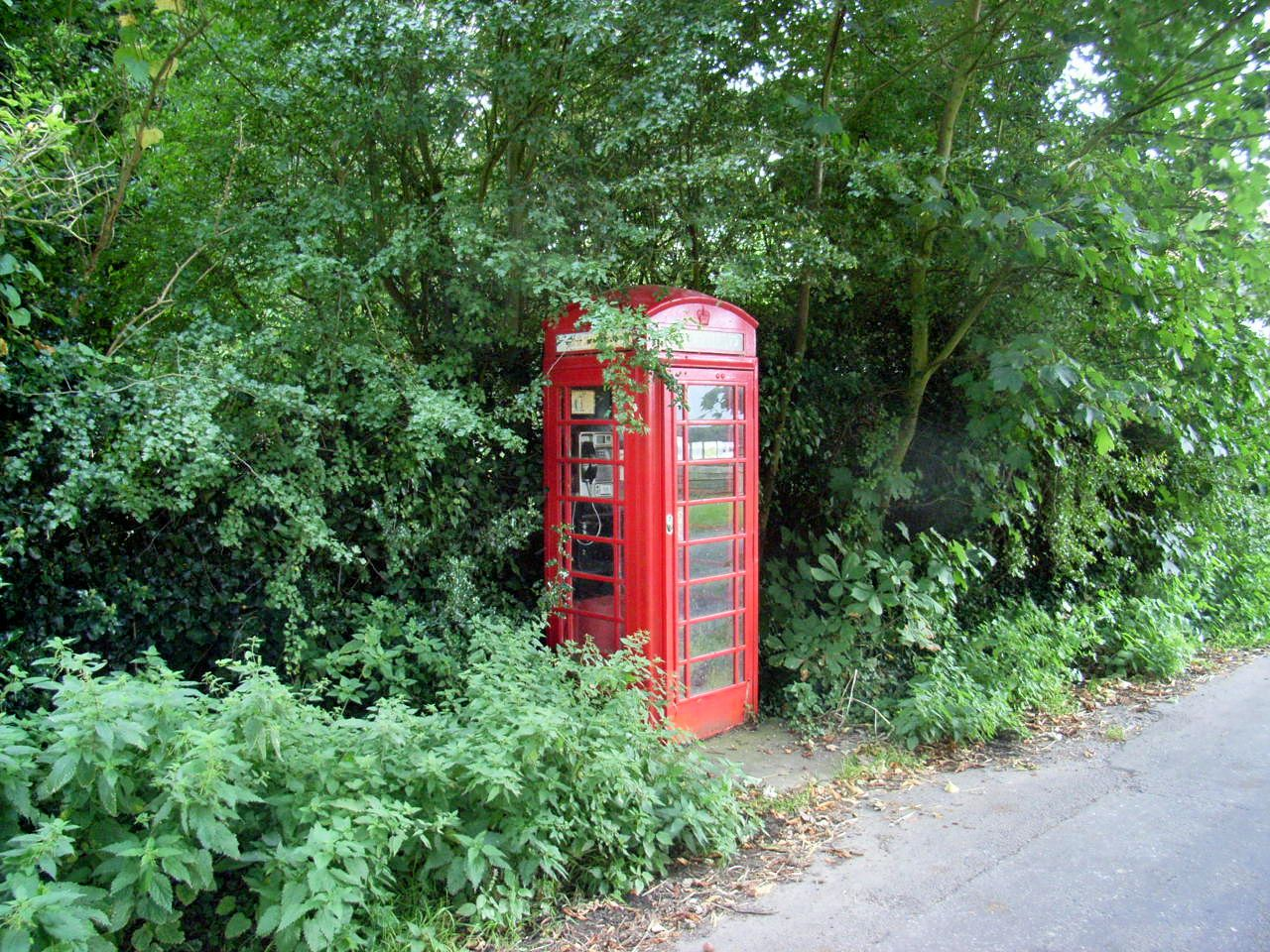
Red telephone box sited in the centre of the village

Until the end of the 20th century, the village had a post office and general stores along with a public house, The Blacksmiths Arms, a Grade II listed building, in part of 17th century origin.

The original post office opened in 1847 and was run by church warden Tom Clements from a building next to the rectory. The building, which now forms part of a Grade II*listed private dwelling, is thought to be the second-oldest surviving post office building in England with a service dating from 1847. The post office briefly moved to another location in The Street under the stewardship of local schoolmistress Fanny Harris (who operated the service from 1926); however, it returned to the original site in 1946 under the new sub-postmistress Irene Bugden and was run as a small general stores until it closed in 1976. Fanny Harris (then 92 years old and the village's oldest inhabitant) and Robin Leigh-Pemberton were passengers on the first postbus service on 4 March 1974. A new post office and stores operated at a different property in the village for a further 20 years until it was closed in the 1990s. Today, the village retains only the Blacksmiths Arms and a traditional red post box.

In the 19th century, an additional public house existed at the northern edge of the village near Norwood Farm and was known as The Woodman's Arms (and possibly also as The Norwood Arms). The pub was recorded on Ordnance Survey maps of the village between 1870 and 1946, but as of May 2012, the building is a Grade II listed private dwelling. Other listed buildings in the village include the timber-framed houses Norwood Manor and Blacksmiths Cottage. A large country house now known as Wormshill Court and bordered to the north and east by a brick wall includes the outbuildings of Manor Farm. The property is part of a large estate which has for several generations belonged to the Nightingale family. The house and farm is also shown on a map of 1636 and at that time appears to represent the only building in the village other than the church and the rectory. In 1858 a further map of the manor named the property Court Lodge Farm and included an inset plan showing the exchange of land between the governors of Christ's Hospital and a Mr. Henry Hudson.

Wormshill retained its own telephone exchange until the 1990s, when it became part of the Maidstone exchange. A red telephone box remains in the village after residents insisted that it not be replaced with a modern design however the telephony was disconnected (and the box sealed) in November 2009 as a result of lack of use. An informal village noticeboard is on the side of an old flint and wood barn that was part of the former Home Farm. The post box and telephone box are at the same location. The telephone box is a listed building.

The Bredgar and Wormshill Light Railway attracts tourists and railway enthusiasts throughout the summer season. The railway is a narrow gauge light railway run between two small stations on about 0.5 mi (0.8 km) of track built in woodland between Bredgar and Wormshill.

== Transport ==
The Post Bus at Wormshill Post Office

A number of ancient trackways including the Pilgrims' Way and the North Downs Way (now designated as footpaths or byways) pass within a few miles of the village. Wormshill is not on any major roadways and has no rail service. No standard public transport facilities or taxicab operations exist in the village. A daily Postbus service, incorporated into the village postal delivery and collection timetable and which ran for 35 years, stopped on 14 November 2009. It was one of the last remaining postbus services in the United Kingdom.

The service, run by the Royal Mail and subsidised by the county council, began in March 1974 and collected residents from Wormshill and other villages en route to Sittingbourne. The closure of the only means of public transport to and from the village was controversial and, following a campaign by local councillors and journalists, the postbus was replaced by a temporary minibus service, funded by the county council. Royal Mail postal deliveries continue to be made to the village. The village lies between the M2 and M20 motorways, and the nearest railway station is at Harrietsham on the Maidstone Line, 3.8 mi (6 km) to the south by road.

== Education ==
A small one-roomed National school (a school established by the National Society for Promoting Religious Education) was built in the village in 1872 for about 30 children. However some evidence exists that it had "accommodation for forty-two children and an average attendance of twenty-eight". The school was recorded on maps of the village until 1909, although it was dissolved in 1930 (school mistresses Miss Fanny Harris and Miss Pepper later ran the post office and general store from an outhouse at Flint Cottage). The building that housed the school has since been converted to a private dwelling. The school's small playground was lined by lime trees planted in memory of a general at the end of the Boer Wars. As of November 2011 the lime trees are still there. The nearest primary school to the village is the Milstead and Frinsted Church of England School at Milstead. Secondary school pupils are educated in the towns of Sittingbourne or Maidstone.

== Religion ==
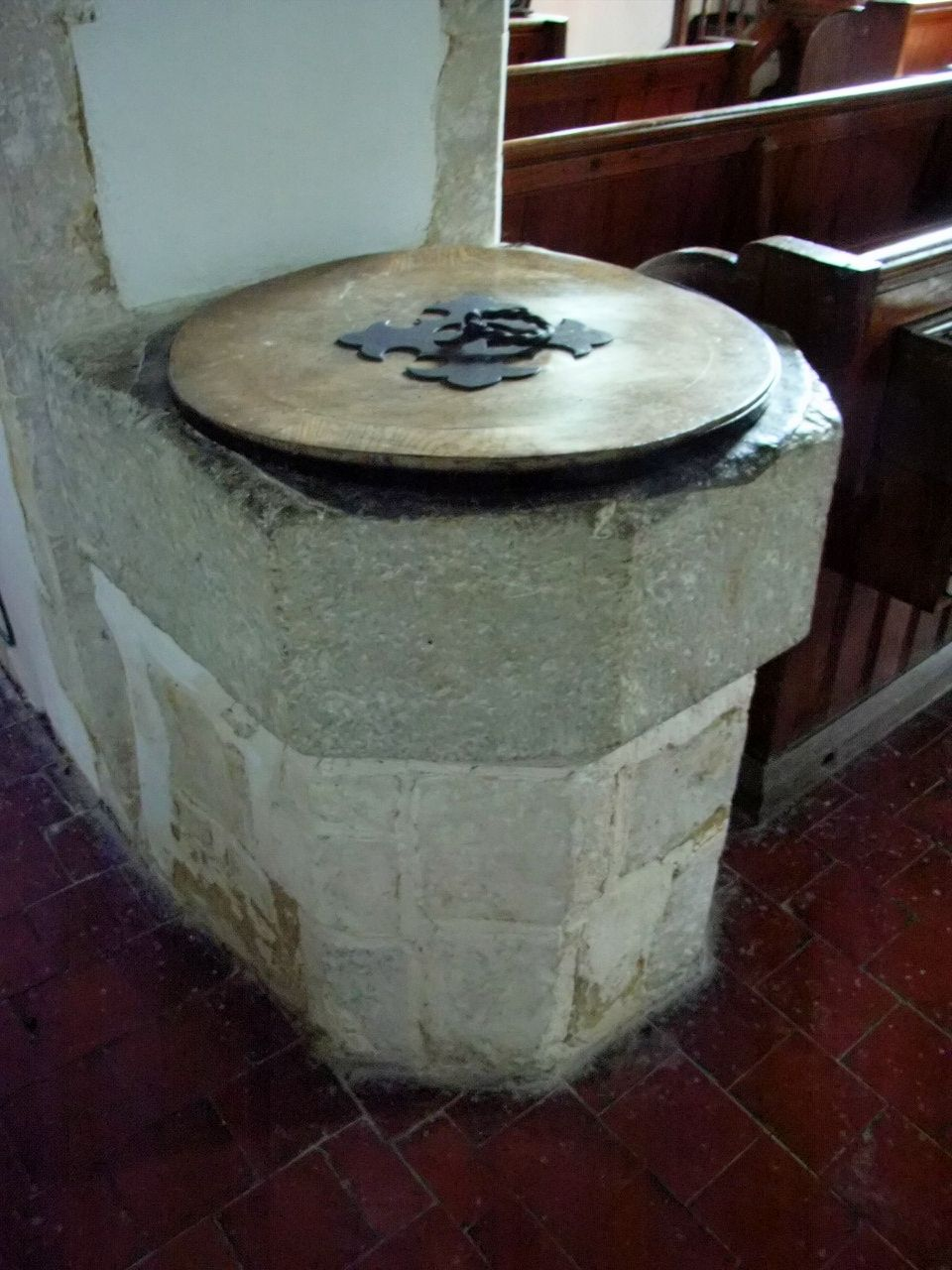
Norman era baptismal font, St Giles' Church

The church, parts of which date back to the Norman era, is dedicated to Saint Giles and forms part of the united benefice of Tunstall and Bredgar, along with the villages of Rodmersham, Milstead, Bicknor and Frinsted. The ecclesiastical parish of Wormshill is in the Diocese of Canterbury and the Sittingbourne deanery (within the archdeaconry of Maidstone). As of March 2018, the rector was the Reverend Alan Pinnegar.

In 1995, the church received a new ring of six bells after a campaign by villagers begun in 1944 by Michael Nightingale of Cromarty, who at age 16 opened a savings account with 10 shillings for the restoration of the church's bells. Fifty years later, he completed the full ring of six bells: one of the six was original, and the other five were rescued from abandoned churches. The last major renovations of the church occurred in 1789 and 1901. Of note within the church are a Norman font and Tudor pulpit. The church also contains a 13th century chest, first discovered in the early 20th century. The former rectory is now a private dwelling.

== Community and culture ==
=== Notable people ===
A vicar at the Rectory of Wormshill in the 19th century, Reverend Josiah Disturnell, was the subject of a debate about exceptional human longevity; it was claimed that he lived to age 107. References to the rector's memorial stone in the church ultimately provided evidence that his actual age of death was "either 91 or 93". Sir Henry Rew, a leading authority on agricultural economics, a former assistant secretary at the Ministry of Agriculture, Fisheries and Food and president of the Royal Statistical Society (1920–1922) died at his home in the village on 7 April 1929.

=== Filmography ===
In January 2007, the church and its surroundings were used as locations in the filming of an episode of EastEnders, broadcast in the United Kingdom over the Easter 2007 holiday season. The production crew added mock gravestones and a temporary Victorian-style street lamp to the churchyard. Also featured were other locations in and near the village, including exterior shots of the Blacksmiths Arms combined with interior views of the nearby Ringlestone Inn.

=== Recreation ===
The village holds typical English rural festivals during the year. The spring and harvest festivals are horticultural shows that include the surrounding villages. The country fair (or fête) in the summer previously included traditional country games, stalls and attractions such as hay bale throwing, tug of war and a coconut shy, although the village has not held a fête since 2009. Wormshill contains a community village hall and recreation ground, including a small playground. The 9th Sittingbourne (Tunstall and Wormshill) Scout Group are associated with the village and group meetings are occasionally held at the village hall. Wormshill, together with the united benefice villages of Bredgar, Milstead, Bicknor and Frinsted, also produces a free monthly Parish Magazine including village news, announcements and occasional articles. In common with a number of rural communities in the county, Wormshill also receives a weekly mobile library service run by Kent County Council.
