= Tilden (surname) =

Tilden is a surname of English origin. Spelling variants include Tildon, Tileden, Tillden, and Tylden. The name may refer to:

- Barbara Tilden (born 1955), New Zealand field hockey player
- Bill Tilden (1893–1953), American tennis player
- Brad Tilden (born 1961), American businessman
- Charles Lee Tilden (1857–1950), American lawyer and businessman
- Charles Lee Tilden, Jr. (1894–1968), American rugby player
- Charles William Tilden (1832-1914), Col 16th Maine Volunteer Infantry at Gettysburg
- Daniel R. Tilden (1804–1890), American politician
- Douglas Tilden (1861–1935), American sculptor
- Freeman Tilden (1883–1980), American preservationist
- George Thomas Tilden (1845–1919), American architect
- Geraldine Tilden, American curler
- Guy Tilden (1858–1929), American architect
- Jane Tilden (1910–2002), Austrian actress
- John Henry Tilden (1851-1940), American physician
- Josephine Tilden (1869–1957), American scientist
- Leif Tilden (born 1964), American actor
- Luther F. Tilden (1834-1929), American Pioneer and Farmer
- Mark Tilden (born 1961), Canadian robotics physicist
- Philip Tilden (1887–1956), British architect
- Samuel J. Tilden (1814–1886), American politician and candidate in the highly contested 1876 Presidential election
- Samuel Tilden Norton (1877–1959), American architect
- William A. Tilden (1842–1926), British chemist

== See also ==
- Tilden (disambiguation)
- Tylden (disambiguation)
