= Tylden family =

Landholding family with origins in England in the Middle Ages

The Tylden (or Tilden) family represent a landholding family with origins in England in the Middle Ages. A branch of the family emigrated to the American colonies in the early 17th century and established the Tilden family line in America.

== History ==
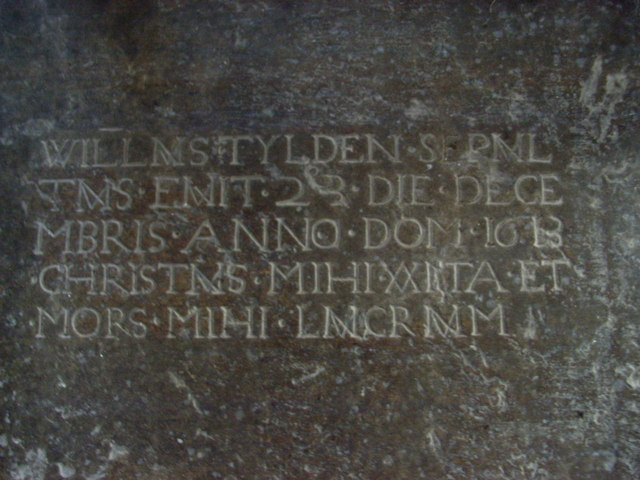
Memorial stone for William Tylden, dated 1613, located at St Giles, Wormshill.

During the reign of Henry II, there are records of a Sir Richard Tylden who was seneschal (or steward) to Hugh de Lacy, Constable of Chester.

Henry's son, Richard I "the Lionheart", who led the Third Crusade with Philip II of France in 1190, was accompanied by a Sir Richard Tylden. His son was probably Sir Richard of Sittenbourne who married Gertrude daughter of Sir William Vernon of Fordsham, Cheshire. Their son, Sir Henry Tylden, married Phillipa de Boteler (daughter of Sir Richard Boteler of Lancashire). Their son, Sir William Tylden, married Constance daughter of Rodolphus Gannett who in turn produced Sir William Tylden who served under the Black Prince in the Battle of Poitiers in 1356.

The Tyldens possessed several manors in Kent, in the parishes of Brenchley, Kennington, Otterden, Milstead, Tilmanstone and Wormshill.

The line extends through numerous generations and branches out in three lines - the eldest remained possessed of its lands in Kent, one branch went to Sussex (with one of its members migrating to America) and one moved to Ifield.

Descendants of the Tylden line continued to reside at Milsted Manor in Milstead, Kent, until the 20th century including William Burton Tylden (1790–1854), an officer in the Royal Engineers, and James Tylden who served in the British Army during World War I and played cricket for Kent County Cricket Club after the war.

== American Tildens ==
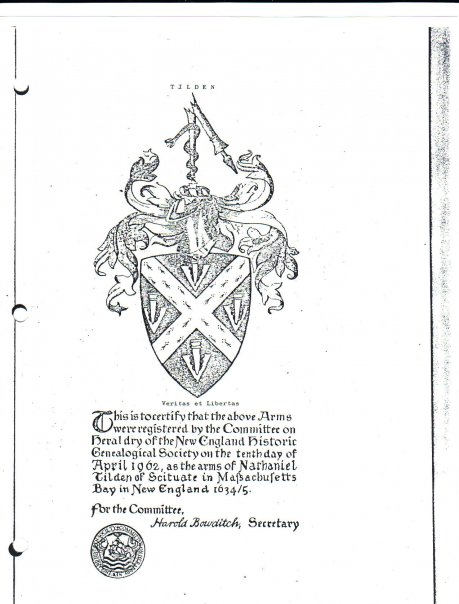
Copy of Certificate verifying the Coat of Arms of Nathaniel Tilden (1634/5)

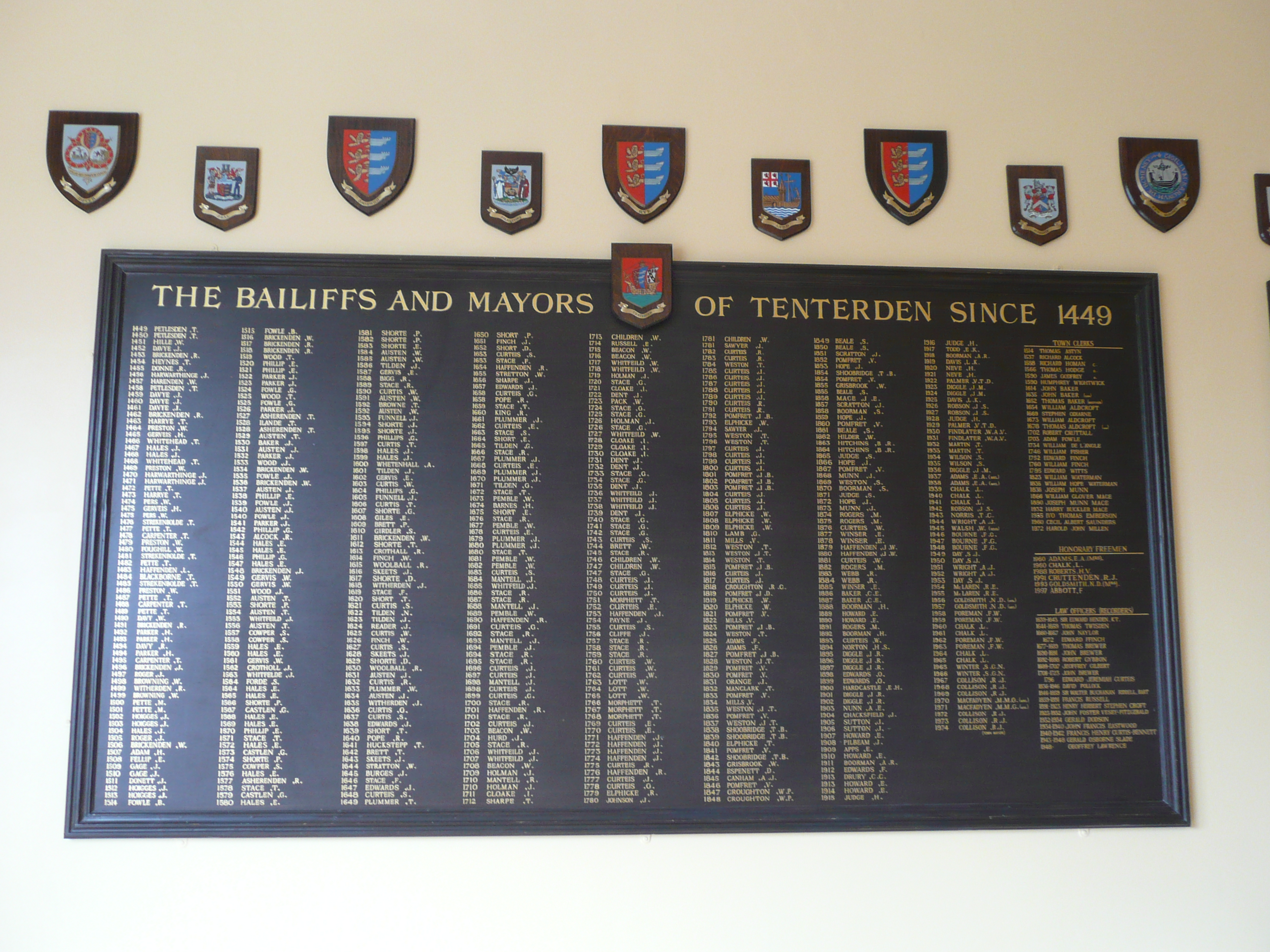
Plaque in Tenterden Town Hall Listing Mayors of Tenterden, Kent, England.

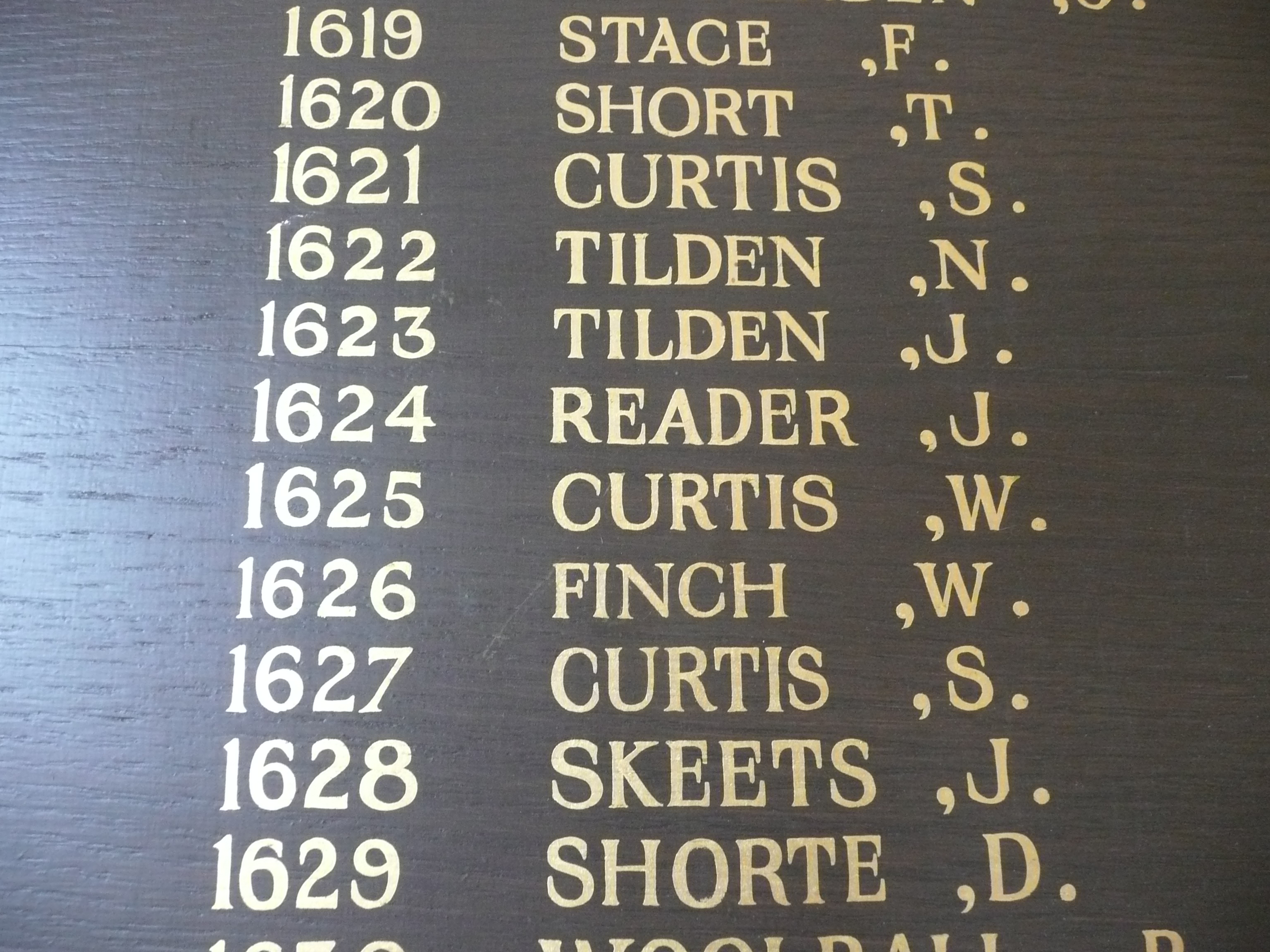
Close up of Nathaniel Tilden's listing as mayor in 1622, brother Joseph Tilden as Mayor in 1623.

The Tilden families of America descend from John Tilden, a clothier of Benenden, born around 1400. His descendant, Nathaniel Tilden, sailed with his family (his wife Lydia (née Huckstep), seven children and seven servants) in March 1634 on the Hercules, from Sandwich, Kent to Massachusetts Bay Colony. Nathaniel Tilden, the first name on the passenger list of the Hercules, had been mayor of Tenterden in 1622 and his immediate family had held similarly official roles in Tenterden and the surrounding community. Nathaniel Tilden was chosen ruling elder of the first church of Scituate, Massachusetts within a year after his arrival. His name is recorded in the first conveyance of land recorded in Scituate in 1634: "of all that land which I have of Goodman Byrd lying within the fence at the north end of the third cliffe, unto the land of Nathaniel Tilden."

The connection of the Tildens to the earliest days of settlement in New England are numerous. Nathaniel's brother Joseph, two years his junior, was one of the merchant adventurers of London who fitted out the Mayflower. Similarly Nathaniel Tilden's youngest son, Stephen married Hannah Little of Plymouth, Massachusetts, whose father had married the daughter of Richard Warren, a passenger on the Mayflower.

=== Notable members of the Tilden family ===
- Bill Tilden, tennis player
- George Thomas Tilden, Boston architect
- Samuel J. Tilden, Governor of New York and Democratic candidate for President of the United States in 1876.
- Luther F. Tilden, prominent pioneer in Orange County, Florida.
- Charles William Tilden, Colonel, 16th Maine.
- William Tilden, a Boston Unitarian clergyman and the father of George Tilden.
- Commodore Edward Preble, Commodore of the American fleet in 1804 when it bombarded Tripoli, was a great-great-grandson of Nathaniel Tilden, whose daughter, Judith, married Abraham Preble.
- Guy Tilden, noted architect from the Canton, Ohio area.
- Tracy Tilden Droz Tragos, Emmy award-winning documentary filmmaker. Granddaughter of Barbara Tilden and 8th great-granddaughter of Nathaniel Tilden. Mother of Charlotte Dorothy Tilden Droz Tragos and Penelope Glenn Tilden Droz Tragos.
- Neil Lamont Tilden, Canadian Broadcaster for CBC Radio and T.V.
- Charles "Rip" Tilden, co-partner of Makarios Consulting and co-author of Leading on Purpose

== See also ==
- Tilden (disambiguation)

== Bibliography ==
- Carlaw, Derek (2020). Kent County Cricketers, A to Z: Part One (1806–1914) (PDF). Cardiff: ACS.
