= Tylden =

Tylden may refer to:

- Tylden, South Africa, town in South Africa
- Tylden, Victoria, a town in central Victoria, Australia
  - Tylden railway station, Victoria, a former station on the Daylesford railway line
- Tylden family, an ancient landholding family founded in England
- William Tylden (1790–1854), British Army officer of the Napoleonic era
- James Tylden (1889–1949), an English cricketer
- Elizabeth Tylden (1917–2009), the British psychiatrist

== See also ==
- Tilden (disambiguation)
