= Ringlestone Inn =

Pub in Wormshill, Kent, England

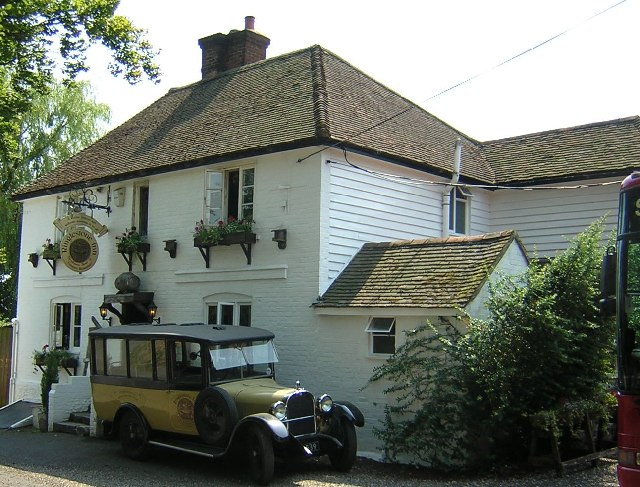
- Interactive map of the Ringlestone Inn area

General information
- Architectural style: Tudor
- Location: Ringlestone hamlet, England
- Coordinates: 51.270239°N 0.692911°E
- Construction started: 1533
- Demolished: Existing

Technical details
- Structural system: Brick and flint walls with oak beams

The Ringlestone Inn is an historic public house and restaurant, located in the Ringlestone hamlet near the village of Wormshill in Kent, England. Dating back to the reign of Henry VIII (1509–1547) the current Grade II listed building was constructed in 1533 and retains its original brick and flint walls and oak beams. The interior is unchanged since around 1732 and includes tables crafted from the timbers of an 18th-century Thames barge. An inscription on an ancient oak sideboard formerly found at the property reads: A Ryghte Joyouse and welcome greetynge too ye all, it is now located at Knole as it is inscribed with the names John Tufton, Earl of Thanet and Margaret Sackville (his wife) of Knole.

== History ==
The history of the Ringlestone Inn has been researched by a number of previous owners and is broadly thought to be as follows:

=== Early history ===
Ringlestone or Rongostone (meaning "ring of stones") dates back to before the Norman conquest of England in 1066 and is mentioned in the Domesday Book of 1086. Confusingly for research into the locality's history, "Ringleton" also cited in the Domesday Book (and appearing in the Kent Hundred Rolls of 1274 as "Ringlestone"), was a manor near the Ringlemere barrow, Woodnesborough (also in Kent). In addition a suburb of the nearby town of Maidstone is also called "Ringlestone".

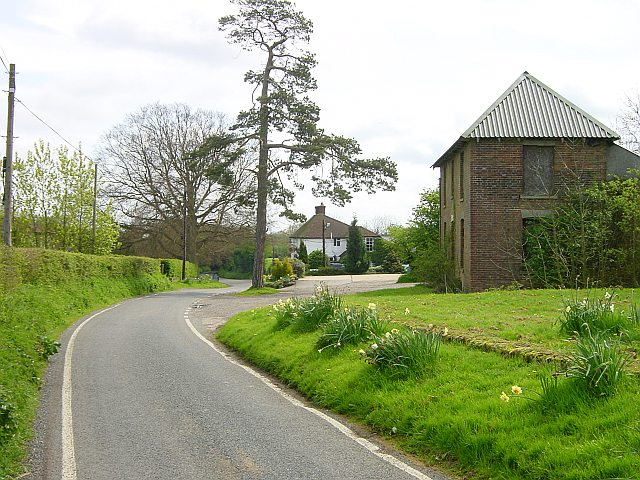
Ringlestone Road showing Ringlestone Inn in the distance

The present-day inn was originally a hospice, owned by the church for the sanctuary of monks, who are believed to have farmed the land surrounding the inn. In addition other medieval dwellings have been uncovered on the site. Around 1539, the monks are believed to have left (likely imprisoned or executed), following the Dissolution of the Monasteries ordered by Henry VIII.

The inn is then referenced in a will dated 1588, when a Julius Papworth Quiller directed that

"my house at Rongoston and land thereto belonging be sold to pay my debts and legacies".

Accordingly, the property was auctioned off to a Septimus Hepplewhite, a wheelwright and cooper from the Parish of Hollingbourne.

Hepplewhite operated a small cooperage from the site until his death in 1609, following which his wife and eldest son took over the house and cooperage business. Oliver Hepplewhite, under the direction of his mother, introduced the production and sale of ale to the property around 1615.

In common with the times, local breweries (three are listed in the parish of Harrietsham during this period) would fund small drinking establishments to promote their products, such establishments, requiring a licence under the Ale Houses Act 1551, were known as 'ale-houses'.

During the next 150 years, the inn grew in popularity and travellers stopped there for refreshment en route to and from London to the settlements of Kent. Samuel Cooper, a celebrated 17th century miniaturist, is said to have visited the house in 1656. A "Gentleman of the Road" (or highwayman) Elias Shepherd, known to have held up coaches between Faversham and Canterbury, is believed to have frequented the inn (Shepherd was captured at Charing and hanged at Penenden Heath in 1765).

On Friday 1 March 1788, two smugglers, named John Roberts and Francis Whorlow who were both wanted for the murder of two dragoons and the smuggling of five-thousand gallons of genever (or Dutch) gin at Whitstable, were arrested at "Ringleton" and taken to Faversham gaol. In his defence at the Old Bailey, John Roberts provided the alibi that he was visiting his family at "Ringleton" at the time the murders took place. In the face of this evidence both men were acquitted. The owner of the Ringlestone Inn at the time is recorded as "Avery Roberts".

The name Rongoston has evolved since the time the Inn was built. This is believed to be due to mispronunciation over the course of time. In 1822 the house became known as the Renglestone and a sign hung announcing it. The Inn continued to be known as such until 1867 when it was changed, for the final time, to the present-day Ringlestone Inn.

=== 20th century to present day ===
At least from 1901 until his death in 1905, the innkeeper was Henry Brooks Bates. It is not known when he first became innkeeper but from the censuses available it was between 1891 and 1901. In 1913 Charles Alfred Rayfield took over the inn. Rayfield was the father of Charles 'Gunner' Rayfield, the soldier who may have fired the first artillery shot against the Germans in the First World War.

In 1958 Florence (Ma) and Dora Gasking (who were mother and daughter) took over the inn. Building a notorious reputation they were frequently armed with a shotgun, inspecting their clientele and requiring unwanted guests to leave. They are also said to have thrown concrete blocks from the windows and required a speakeasy-style series of secret knocks to gain entry to the pub. Their behaviour is believed to stem from an occasion when the inn was inundated by around 300 bikers.

From the late 20th century to 2018, the inn has largely operated as a public house and restaurant and was purchased by Kent brewers, Shepherd Neame in 2005. As of May 2018 the inn was closed and the building being prepared for auction.

Interior images of the inn were used as locations in the filming of an episode of EastEnders broadcast in the United Kingdom over the Easter 2007 holiday season.

August 2019 saw the Ringlestone Inn open its doors once again after an 18-month closure and refurbishment, and is now a free house and restaurant as it once was. New owners Dalton Hopper and Paolo Rigolli have undertaken extensive work whilst retaining all original brickwork.

== Paranormal activity ==
The inn's long-history has resulted in a number of reports of supposed paranormal or supernatural activity:
