= Petronilla de la Mare =

Petronilla de la Mare (née de Dunstanville, born 1248) was an English noblewoman. The daughter and sole heir of Walter de Dunstanville, she married Robert de Montfort (d. 1274). Her privileges are mentioned in the Hundred Rolls of 1274, the third of Edward the First. After the death of her first husband, Petronilla married John de la Mare (d. 1313).
