= Ringlestone =

Hamlet in Kent, England

Coordinates: 51.270239°N 0.692911°E

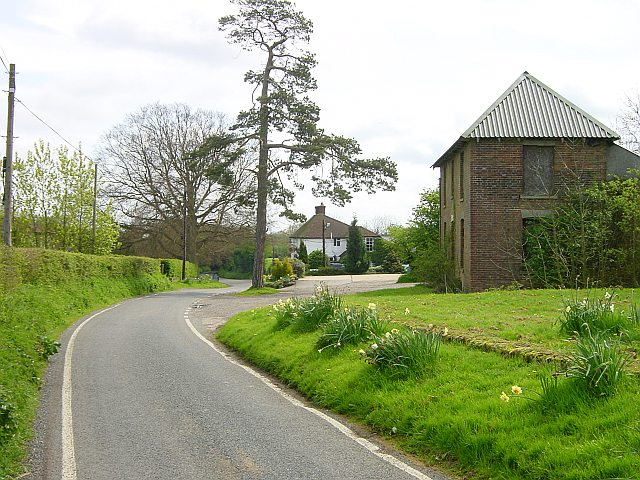
- Ringlestone Road leading to the Ringlestone Inn

- Location within Kent
- OS grid reference: TQ8782755844
- District: Maidstone
- Shire county: Kent
- Region: South East
- Country: England
- Sovereign state: United Kingdom
- Post town: Maidstone
- Postcode district: ME17
- Dialling code: 01622
- Police: Kent
- Fire: Kent
- Ambulance: South East Coast
- UK Parliament: Faversham and Mid Kent

Ringlestone /ˈrɪŋɡəlstoʊn/ is a hamlet between Wormshill and Harrietsham in the Maidstone district of Kent, England. It is in the civil parish of Wormshill.

Ringlestone or Rongostone (meaning "ring of stones") dates back to before the Norman conquest of England in 1066 and is mentioned in the Domesday Book of 1086.

At the time of the Domesday Survey, the hamlet was smaller than it is today and yet was still deemed worthy of recording as noted by Edward Hasted in his 18th century survey of Kent:

On the summit of the hill, at the south-east boundaries of this parish, next to Harrietsham, is a small hamlet, consisting of only three houses, belonging to farms of but small rents, which, however insignificant it may seem now, seems antiently to have been of some account, having been thought of sufficient consequence to be entered in the survey of Domesday, under the title of the possessions of Odo, bishop of Baieux, as follows: Richard holds of the bishop Rongostone, it was taxed at one suling. The arable land is . . . . . There are two villeins, having one carucate, and it paid six shillings in the time of king Edward the Confessor, and afterwards, and now it is worth [f]orty shillings. Ulviet held it of king Edward.

Today the hamlet is a collection of cottages and a public house surrounding a former farm, now converted to the Ringlestone Farmhouse Hotel. The Ringlestone Inn, a central feature of the hamlet, is an historic 16th century ale-house.
