= Bedmonton =

Hamlet in Kent, England

Coordinates: 51.288920°N 0.684990°E

- Location within Kent
- District: Maidstone
- Shire county: Kent
- Region: South East
- Country: England
- Sovereign state: United Kingdom
- Post town: Sittingbourne
- Postcode district: ME9
- Police: Kent
- Fire: Kent
- Ambulance: South East Coast
- UK Parliament: Faversham and Mid Kent

Bedmonton or Bedmanton is a hamlet situated about five miles (8 km) on a minor road between the B2163 road and Wormshill to the south of Sittingbourne in Kent, England.
