= Listed buildings in Milstead =

Historic structures in Kent, England

Milstead is a village and civil parish in the Swale District of Kent, England. It contains 20 listed buildings that are recorded in the National Heritage List for England. Of these two are grade II* and 18 are grade II.

This list is based on the information retrieved online from Historic England.

== Key ==
| Grade | Criteria |
|---|---|
| I | Buildings that are of exceptional interest |
| II* | Particularly important buildings of more than special interest |
| II | Buildings that are of special interest |

== Listing ==
| Name | Grade | Location | Type | Completed (Note: The date given is the date used by Historic England as significant for the initial building or that of an important part in the structure's description.) | Date designated | Grid ref. (Note: The grid reference is based on the British national grid reference system, sometimes known as OSGB36, used by the Ordnance Survey.) Geo-coordinates | Notes | Entry number (Note: The "List Entry Number" is a unique number assigned to each listed building and scheduled monument by Historic England.) | Image | Wikidata |
|---|---|---|---|---|---|---|---|---|---|---|
| Orchard Cottage | II | | | | 21 March 1985 | TQ9036358052; 51°17′23″N 0°43′43″E | | 1343951 | Upload Photo | Q26627712 |
| Rose Cottage | II | | | | 21 March 1985 | TQ9041058822; 51°17′48″N 0°43′47″E | | 1119628 | Upload Photo | Q26412937 |
| Woodstock Cottage Farmhouse | II | Broadoak Road | | | 21 March 1985 | TQ9029460091; 51°18′29″N 0°43′44″E | | 1069277 | Upload Photo | Q26322131 |
| Woodstock Cottages | II | 3-4, Broadoak Road | | | 21 March 1985 | TQ9034760315; 51°18′36″N 0°43′47″E | | 1343952 | Upload Photo | Q26627713 |
| Barn 50 Yards South East of Great Higham Farmhouse | II | Down Court Road | | | 21 March 1985 | TQ9216657908; 51°17′16″N 0°45′16″E | | 1107912 | Upload Photo | Q26401700 |
| Great Higham Farmhouse | II | Down Court Road | | | 24 January 1967 | TQ9207457989; 51°17′19″N 0°45′11″E | | 1069279 | Upload Photo | Q26322134 |
| Church of St Mary and the Holy Cross | II* | Frinsted Road | church building | | 24 January 1967 | TQ9035858760; 51°17′46″N 0°43′44″E | | 1069286 | Church of St Mary and the Holy Cross More images | Q17546258 |
| Holly Bushes Cottage | II | Hollybushes | | | 21 March 1985 | TQ9114557817; 51°17′15″N 0°44′23″E | | 1069282 | Upload Photo | Q26322137 |
| Dovecote 50 Yards East of Milstead Manor | II | Manor Road | | | 21 March 1985 | TQ9043558706; 51°17′44″N 0°43′48″E | | 1325223 | Upload Photo | Q26610799 |
| Garden Wall and Gateways to North of Milstead Manor | II | Manor Road | | | 24 January 1967 | TQ9041158744; 51°17′46″N 0°43′47″E | | 1069283 | Upload Photo | Q26322139 |
| Manor Farmhouse | II | Manor Road | | | 24 January 1967 | TQ9049658740; 51°17′45″N 0°43′51″E | | 1325217 | Upload Photo | Q26610793 |
| Milstead Manor | II* | Manor Road | manor house | | 27 August 1952 | TQ9041458726; 51°17′45″N 0°43′47″E | | 1343916 | Milstead Manor More images | Q17546504 |
| Clare Cottage | II | Rawling Street | | | 21 March 1985 | TQ9023858186; 51°17′28″N 0°43′37″E | | 1069284 | Upload Photo | Q26322141 |
| Finche's Farmhouse | II | Rawling Street | | | 21 March 1985 | TQ9020358240; 51°17′29″N 0°43′35″E | | 1107881 | Upload Photo | Q26401670 |
| Hoggeshaws | II | Rawling Street | | | 27 August 1952 | TQ9033058716; 51°17′45″N 0°43′43″E | | 1069285 | Upload Photo | Q26322143 |
| Lion Farmhouse | II | Rawling Street | | | 24 January 1967 | TQ9071159489; 51°18′09″N 0°44′04″E | | 1343918 | Upload Photo | Q26627684 |
| Old Rectory | II | Rawling Street | | | 21 March 1985 | TQ9030658803; 51°17′48″N 0°43′42″E | | 1325210 | Upload Photo | Q26610787 |
| The Cottage | II | Rawling Street | | | 24 January 1967 | TQ9028058619; 51°17′42″N 0°43′40″E | | 1343917 | Upload Photo | Q26627683 |
| Wisteria Cottage | II | Rawling Street | | | 21 March 1985 | TQ9031558634; 51°17′42″N 0°43′42″E | | 1107847 | Upload Photo | Q26401639 |
| War Memorial to the Third Battalion of the Gloucestershire Regiment | II | Sittingbourne, ME9 0SD | | | 24 June 2020 | TQ9005658973; 51°17′53″N 0°43′29″E | | 1468921 | Upload Photo | Q97460622 |

== See also ==
- Grade I listed buildings in Kent
- Grade II* listed buildings in Kent

== Sources ==
- Newman, John (2013) [1969], Kent: North-East and East, The Buildings of England, New Haven and London: Yale University Press, ISBN 978-0-300-18506-5
