= Frinsted =

Village in Kent, England

Coordinates: 51.284000°N 0.703000°E

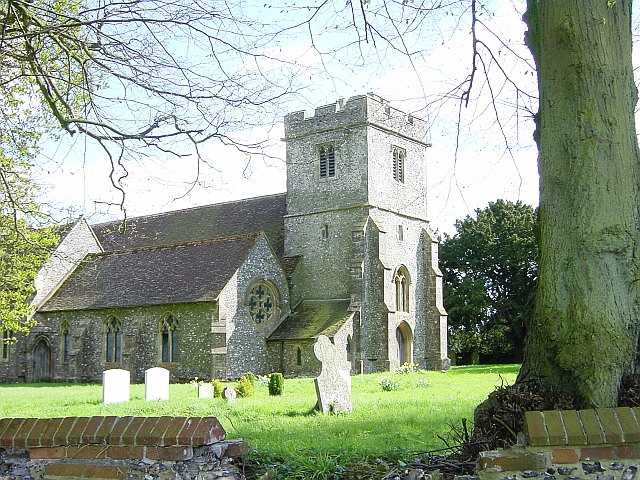
- St Dunstan's church

- Location within Kent
- Population: 143 (2011 Census)
- OS grid reference: TQ8957
- Civil parish: Wormshill
- District: Maidstone
- Shire county: Kent
- Region: South East
- Country: England
- Sovereign state: United Kingdom
- Post town: Sittingbourne
- Postcode district: ME9
- Dialling code: 01622
- Police: Kent
- Fire: Kent
- Ambulance: South East Coast
- UK Parliament: Faversham and Mid Kent

Frinsted or Frinstead is a small village and civil parish in the ecclesiastical parish of Wormshill and in the Maidstone District of Kent, England. and has been a recorded settlement (under the name Fredenestede) as far back as the Domesday Book and indeed was the only settlement in the surrounding area to be described at the time to have a church. The village exists in the Hundred of Eyhorne (and has been mentioned as such dating back to the Kent Hundred Rolls of 1274 to 1275).

The parish is situated on the North Downs between Sittingbourne and Maidstone some ten miles (16 km) south of The Swale. To the West lies the village of Wormshill, to the North East the village of Milstead, the hamlet of Kingsdown and the Torry Hill estate and to the South and South East are the villages of Doddington and Newnham. The part of the parish northward of the church is in the division of East Kent, but the church itself, and the remaining part of it is in West Kent.

The village is surrounded by former manor houses or "courts" being to the east Wrinsted court and to the west, Yokes Court and Madams Court.

The population is relatively unchanged in the past 200 years. In 1801 Frinsted's total population was 153. After rising to 219 around 1871, by the 1901 census the population had dropped to 126. By 1971 the population was 138. At the 2001 census, the population was 171, falling at the 2011 Census to 143.

The village church is today dedicated to St Dunstan although an early 19th-century watercolour records it as dedicated to All Saints. Although it has Norman origins, the church as it stands today was constructed principally in the 12th century and was repaired and enlarged in 1862. The bell tower is typical of the Perpendicular Period.

== History ==
=== Early history ===
Iron Age coins (or staters) dating back to the 1st century BC have been found in fields near the village.

The parish was part of those possessions which William the Conqueror gave his half-brother Odo, bishop of Baieux, under whose name it appears in the Domesday Book:

"Hugh, the grandson of Herbert, and Adelold the chamberlain, holds of the bishop (of Baieux) Fredenestede. It was taxed at one suling. The arable land is three carucates. In demesne ... Three villeins having seven oxen. There is a church, and two acres of meadow and an half, and wood for the pannage of two hogs. It is, and was worth, separately, twenty shillings. Leunin held it of king Edward."

Four years after taking the above survey, the bishop was disgraced, and the King, his brother, seized the estate and the rest of his possessions, which were confiscated to the Crown. After which, the village came into the possession of Jeffry de Peverel, forming part of the barony of Peverel, as it was then called, being assigned to him for the defence of Dover Castle.

Nicholas de Gerund later held the manor until he died during the reign of Henry III. The manor then passed to the Crombwell family being in the name of Richard de Crombwell during the reign of Edward II. Ralph de Crombwell, his successor, later, obtained a charter of "free warren" for his lands in the parish, and at his seat at Meriam-court (now commonly known as Madams Court).

During the reign of Edward III this estate transferred first to Richard le Gerund and then via marriage to Sir Henry de Chalfhunt. At this point it appeared in the Kent Hundred Rolls and was noted, among other things, for the death of "a certain stranger killed in Fretthenestede". During the reign of Richard II, the manor was transferred to the ownership of the nearby manor of Ospringe. Subsequently the manor with the manor house then known as "Wrensted" (more recently Rinsted court) and Madams-court sold to Robert le Hadde, resident in the Frinsted during the reign of Henry IV.

Over the course of the following years the land moved many more times between heirs until vesting in the estate of Margaret Style (during the reign of Queen Anne) who in 1716 sold it to a Mr. Abraham Tilghman. A commissioner of the Royal Navy, and of the victualling office he died in 1729 and was interned in the southern part of the church, where there is a monument erected to his memory. The manor stayed in the Tilghman family for the latter part of the 18th century.

=== 19th and 20th centuries ===
During the late nineteenth and early twentieth centuries the population of Frinsted declined from 208 (1881) to 150 (1921), a trend typical of downland parishes as a consequence of agricultural depression and the mechanisation of farming practises.

The village is now a typical North Downs commuter village. Described by John Marius Wilson in 1872, the village was owned principally by the Leigh-Pemberton family in the Barony of Kingsdown. Descendants of the Leigh-Pemberton line still live in the village and the surrounding area.

A popular spot for rural-sightseeing, day-trippers and picnic outings in the summer and game shoots in the winter, the village previously contained a sub-post office, an active cricket club and held an annual horticultural show. Frinsted was also a motorbus terminus for rural intra-county routes. When the services were cancelled, the small bus park and building which included a public house (The Kingsdown Arms) remained a popular pub and restaurant in the area. The pub was finally sold and converted to a private dwelling at the end of the 20th century.

The nearby Milstead and Frinsted Church of England primary school opened in 1848 on land donated by the Leigh-Pemberton family who still retain a position on the school's board of governance.

An early example of an aircraft shot down in a dogfight whilst on a World War I bombing raid occurred near Frinsted on 19 May 1918. A German Gotha GV 979 heavy bomber was engaged by British fighters and crashed in fields near the village with one survivor who was captured. At least one of the German airmen killed was initially buried in Frinsted churchyard before being moved to a military cemetery at Cannock Chase. Previously fields at Yokes Court near the village had been used as a Royal Air Force airfield between February 1917 and November 1917. A private airfield for light aircraft still operates on the Yokes Court site and a second private airstrip exists at The Glebe, a collection of fields immediately to the east of the village.

== Etymology ==
Frinsted has been recorded under a number of names over the years including Fredenestede, Freyhanestede, Frensted, Frethensted, Wronsted and Frinstead. It is thought that the name means a "place of protection" and being possibly derived from the Old English frithen meaning "protection" or fyrhðen meaning "wooded place".

== See also ==
- Listed buildings in Frinsted
