= Listed buildings in Frinsted =

Historic structures in Kent, England

Frinsted is a village and civil parish in the Borough of Maidstone of Kent, England It contains two grade II* and five grade II listed buildings that are recorded in the National Heritage List for England.

This list is based on the information retrieved online from Historic England.

== Key ==
Grade	Criteria
I	Buildings that are of exceptional interest
II*	Particularly important buildings of more than special interest
II	Buildings that are of special interest

== Listing ==
Name	Grade	Location	Type	Completed (Note: The date given is the date used by Historic England as significant for the initial building or that of an important part in the structure's description.)	Date designated	Grid ref. (Note: The grid reference is based on the British national grid reference system, sometimes known as OSGB36, used by the Ordnance Survey.) Geo-coordinates	Notes	Entry number (Note: The "List Entry Number" is a unique number assigned to each listed building and scheduled monument by Historic England.)	Image	Wikidata
Church of St Dunstan	II*				26 April 1968	TQ8917257403; 51°17′04″N 0°42′41″E		1336286	Church of St Dunstan More images	Q17545351
Lenniker Farmhouse	II	Hogbarn Road			14 December 1984	TQ8865955499; 51°16′03″N 0°42′11″E		1086175	Upload Photo	Q26376072
Barn Circa 27 Yards North North West of Madams Court Farmhouse	II	New Purchase Road			14 December 1984	TQ8929256214; 51°16′25″N 0°42′45″E		1086177	Upload Photo	Q26376083
Madams Court Farmhouse	II	New Purchase Road			14 December 1984	TQ8929656179; 51°16′24″N 0°42′45″E		1086176	Upload Photo	Q26376077
New Purchase Farmhouse	II	New Purchase Road			14 December 1984	TQ8926056873; 51°16′46″N 0°42′44″E		1336288	Upload Photo	Q26620792
Yokes Court	II*	New Purchase Road			26 April 1968	TQ8996056532; 51°16′35″N 0°43′20″E		1336287	Yokes Court More images	Q17545356
Kippen	II	Torry Hill Road			14 December 1984	TQ8989257204; 51°16′56″N 0°43′17″E		1086178	Upload Photo	Q26376087

== See also ==
- Grade I listed buildings in Kent
- Grade II* listed buildings in Kent

== Sources ==
- Newman, John (2012) [1969], Kent: West and the Weald, The Buildings of England, New Haven and London: Yale University Press, ISBN 978-0-300-18509-6
