= Tilden =

Tilden may refer to:

== Places ==
Canada

- Tilden Lake, Ontario

United States

- Fort Tilden, former U.S. Army installation in the New York City borough of Queens
- Tilden, Illinois
- Tilden, Indiana
- Tilden, Missouri
- Tilden, Nebraska
- Tilden, Texas
- Tilden, West Virginia
- Tilden, Wisconsin, a town
  - Tilden (community), Wisconsin, an unincorporated community
- Tilden Regional Park, Berkeley, California

== Other uses ==
- Tilden (surname), including a list of people with the surname
- Tilden Middle School, in the Montgomery County Public Schools, Rockville, Maryland
- Tilden Rent-a-Car, Canadian car rental company

== See also ==
- Tilden Township (disambiguation)
- Tylden (disambiguation)
