= Tilden Township =

Tilden Township may refer to:

- Tilden Township, Cherokee County, Iowa
- Tilden Township, Osborne County, Kansas
- Tilden Township, Marquette County, Michigan
- Tilden Township, Polk County, Minnesota
- Tilden Township, Berks County, Pennsylvania

== See also ==
- Tilden (disambiguation)
