= James Tylden =

English cricketer

Personal information
- Full name: James Richard Tylden
- Born: 26 April 1889; Milstead, Kent
- Died: 24 February 1949 (aged 59); London Hospital, Whitechapel, London
- Batting: Left-handed
- Role: Batsman
- Relatives: William Findlay (brother-in-law); Tylden family

Domestic team information
- Years: Team
- 1923: Kent
- Only FC: 12 May 1923 Kent v West Indians
- Source: CricketArchive, 4 March 2025

James Richard Tylden (26 April 1889 – 24 February 1949) was an English landowner, British Army officer and cricketer. He farmed at Milstead in Kent, where he was a Deputy Lieutenant and Justice of the Peace. He served during World War I and, after the war, played in one first-class cricket match for Kent County Cricket Club.

== Early life ==
Tylden was born at Milstead in Kent in 1889, the only son of Richard Tylden and his wife Edith (née Jones). His father was a wealthy farmer who owned Milstead Manor, a property which had been in the Tylden family since the 16th century and where James was born. He was educated, like his father, at Rugby School, where he was a member of the Rifle Corps and was in the cricket XI. He played in Rugby's victories against Marlborough College at Lord's in 1906 and 1907, scoring 46 runs as part of a match-winning partnership with Darsie Watson in his final year.

After leaving school, Tylden went up to St John's College, Oxford in 1907. He played cricket there, top scoring in the 1909 Seniors' Match, although he did not play for the senior university team and The Times considered that he had "several elementary faults to cure before his undoubted scoring abilities" could be "seen to their best advantage". He did not complete his degree and returned to the family farm where he became a deputy lieutenant for Kent in 1908.

== Military service ==
In 1909, Tylden was commissioned as a second lieutenant in the Royal East Kent Mounted Rifles (REKMR), a yeomanry cavalry unit which was part of the Territorial Force. His father had been an officer in the unit, and by 1912 Tylden was in command of the Shorncliffe and Sheppey Troop. The REKMR was mobilised in August 1914 following the outbreak of war, and Tylden joined the 1st Line element at Canterbury where he was promoted to lieutenant. (Note: Members of the Territorial Force were only obliged to serve on the home front at the start of the war. The 1st Line elements were made up of men who signed up for Imperial Service, meaning that they could be sent overseas.) The unit was occupied in training and strengthening coastal defences for the first year of the war.

The REKMR embarked for Gallipoli in September 1915. Tylden was initially employed on base duties at Mudros, before joining the unit at Cape Helles in October. (Note: The 1st battalion REKMR served in a dismounted role during the Gallipoli Campaign, acting as infantry.) The unit was evacuated to Mudros at the end of the December, by which time Tylden had been transferred to a staff role in the REKMR's parent unit, the 42nd (East Lancashire) Infantry Division.

Promoted to the rank of captain and appointed as aide-de-camp to the Division's commander, Major-General William Douglas, Tylden spent 1916 in Egypt. The Division took part in the defence of the Suez Canal and was involved in the Sinai and Palestine campaign, including at the Battle of Romani in August 1916. In early 1917 it was transferred to France, seeing action on the Western Front at Ypres during the Battle of Passchendaele, and on the Yser Front at Nieuwpoort. In October 1917 he was appointed aide-de-camp to the Division's new commanding officer Arthur Solly-Flood, before transferring to 6th Infantry Division in early 1918. He acted as Camp Commandant and aide-de-camp to Major-General Thomas Marden. The Division saw action during the German Hundred Days Offensive and after the armistice was part of the Army of Occupation.

By early 1919, Tylden had become ill as the result of his military service. He relinquished his commission in April 1919 and returned home to his family. During World War II, he served as adjutant of the 2nd London battalion of the Home Guard between 1940 and 1942.

== Cricket ==
Tylden played for Kent County Cricket Club's Second XI between 1920 and 1923, during which time he was also a member of the county's General Committee. Although he was asked to captain the Second XI in 1923 he was only able to play occasionally, although he did make his only first-class appearance during the season, playing against Oxford University at The University Parks. He scored 19 runs in his first innings before recording a duck in his second, before playing later in the year organised by Lord Harris against the touring West Indians. (Note: This was the third time West Indies had toured Britain. The team did not have Test match status at this time.)

Although he played no Second XI cricket after 1923, Tylden played club cricket, including Band of Brothers, East Kent, the Mote, and I Zingari. He served again on Kent's committee between 1929 and 1932. His brother-in-law, William Findlay, played for Oxford University and Lancashire and was later secretary of Surrey and Marylebone Cricket Club (MCC). (Note: Findlay married Tylden's only sister Mary in 1907.)

== Personal life ==
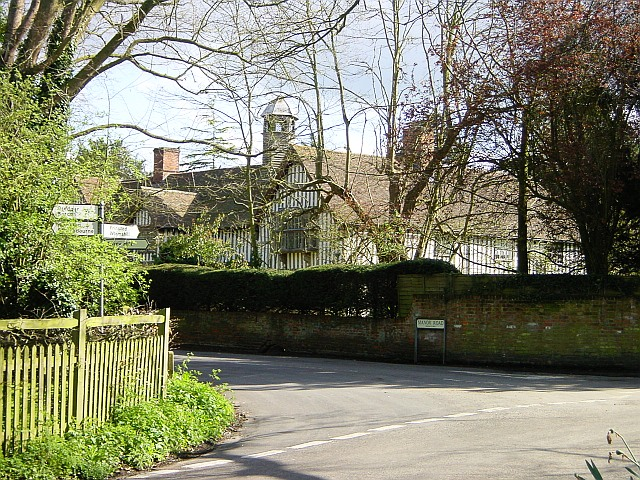
Tylden was the last of the Tylden family to live at Milstead Manor in Kent

Tylden, again following his father, was appointed a justice of the peace in 1920 and was secretary of the Tickham Hunt for ten years. He married Mary Swan in London in 1913; the couple had five daughters. They divorced in 1931 and later the same year Tylden married Margaret Forbes at St Ethelburga's church in London. He farmed over 450 acres (180 ha) at Milstead where he built cottages for farm workers but was the last of the Tylden family to occupy Milstead Manor. He died at the London Hospital following a fall at the Bath Club in 1949. He was 59. A memorial to him was placed in the parish church at Milstead; Milstead Manor was sold following his death.

== Bibliography ==
- Carlaw, Derek (2020). Kent County Cricketers, A to Z: Part Two (1919–1939) (PDF). Cardiff: ACS.
- Lewis, Paul (2014). For Kent and Country. Eastbourne: Reveille Press. ISBN 978-19-08336-63-7.
