= Cambridge Hundred Rolls =

13th-century English census documents

The Cambridge Hundred Rolls are the documentary result of a 13th-century Crown inquiry or census into the rights of the English monarchy over land and property in the hundreds (regional sub-divisions) of the county of Cambridgeshire. The Rolls are preserved in the English National Archives as part of the national Hundred Rolls.

The rolls relating to the town of Cambridge provide a particularly detailed record of the ownership history of property in 1279 and over the preceding 100 years, enabling analysis of family dynasties and more than 1,000 properties.

== Format ==
The Hundred Rolls for the town and county of Cambridge were printed by the Record Commission in 1818 in abbreviated Latin. Recent work has published the complete rolls for the town of Cambridge in an English translation. This includes a third roll which was omitted by the Record Commission, but has recently been discovered.

The Cambridge Hundred Rolls form part of the Hundred Rolls collection held by the National Archives at Kew.
