= Tilden, West Virginia =

Tilden
- Unincorporated community
- Location within the state of West Virginia Tilden (the United States)
- Coordinates: 37°43′44″N 81°10′36″W
- Country: United States
- State: West Virginia
- County: Raleigh
- Elevation: 2,658 ft (810 m)
- Time zone: UTC-5 (Eastern (EST))
  - Summer (DST): UTC-4 (EDT)
- GNIS ID: 1555814

Tilden is an unincorporated community in Raleigh County, West Virginia, United States.
