= Hundred Rolls =

13th-century census of England and Wales

The Hundred Rolls are a census of England and parts of what is now Wales taken in the late thirteenth century. Often considered an attempt to produce a second Domesday Book, they are named after the hundreds by which most returns were recorded.

The Rolls include a survey of royal privileges taken in 1255, and the better known surveys of liberties and land ownership, taken in 1274–5 and 1279–80, respectively. The two main enquiries were commissioned by Edward I of England to record the adult population for judicial and taxation purposes. They also specify the services due from tenants to lords under the feudal system of the time.

Many of the Rolls have been lost and others have been damaged, but a minority survives and is stored at the National Archives in Kew. Where they survive, they are a major source for the period. Those known in the early nineteenth century were published by the Record Commission in 1812–18, while more recent discoveries are being collated by the University of Sheffield.

== Sources ==
- Cam, Helen, Studies in the hundred rolls: some aspects of thirteenth-century administration, Oxford: Clarendon Press, 1921
- Cam, Helen, The hundred and the hundred rolls; an outline of local government in medieval England, London, Methuen 1930

== See also ==
- Cambridge Hundred Rolls
- Kent Hundred Rolls
