= Kent Hundred Rolls =

The Kent Hundred Rolls are the documentary result of a 13th-century Crown inquiry or census into the rights of the English monarchy over land and property in the hundreds (regional sub-divisions) of the county of Kent. The rolls are preserved in the UK National Archives as part of the national Hundred Rolls series.

== Background ==
In 1274, Edward I returned to England from the Ninth Crusade. During this time the country had suffered civil war during the Second Barons' War and local government malpractice and usurpation of Royal rights and privileges.

As a result, an inquiry was to be made into the status of the king's rights which, in some cases, had been appropriated "by lay and ecclesiastical lords" (who had used them to strengthen their power over feudal tenants), and also "into the excessive demands of sheriffs, escheators and coroners, and also of bailiffs and other officials, whether royal or seigniorial."

Henry III had ordered an inquiry into franchises in 1255, and Edward I continuing the move to assert Crown authority at local level, considered that all judicial rights belonged to the Crown, and any private liberty or franchise had to be backed up by royal warrant.

== The Hundred Rolls in Kent ==
Two commissioners were appointed in October 1274, for each group of counties, undertaking their survey from November 1274 to March 1275.

Juries for each hundred were ordered to appear before the commissioners on set dates (the names of the jurors are recorded on the rolls) answering a series of fifty questions and providing them with an opportunity to complain or otherwise highlight to the commissioners examples of misfeasance in franchises, taxes and misuse of Royal warrants among other things. However jurors were, on occasions, unable to answer every aspect of the commissioners' inquiry.

The Kent Hundred Rolls list a number of locations in the county, many of which correspond directly to villages and towns which still exist today. At the same time, there are a number of place names without an identifiable current equivalent and which may refer to abandoned or renamed settlements.

The rolls now form part of the national Hundred Rolls series held by The National Archives at Kew. The Kent rolls are, for the most part, complete. However, certain areas are not represented or are omitted from the record, including the Cinque Ports, the Isle of Sheppey and Ospringe.

== Publication ==
The Hundred Rolls were published in two volumes by the Record Commission in 1812–1818, in their original abbreviated Latin reproduced using record type. Kent appeared in the first volume. More recently, the Kent Archaeological Society has re-edited the complete rolls for Kent, in the original Latin and in English translation.
