= Milstead =

Village in Kent, England

Coordinates: 51.297°N 0.7296°E

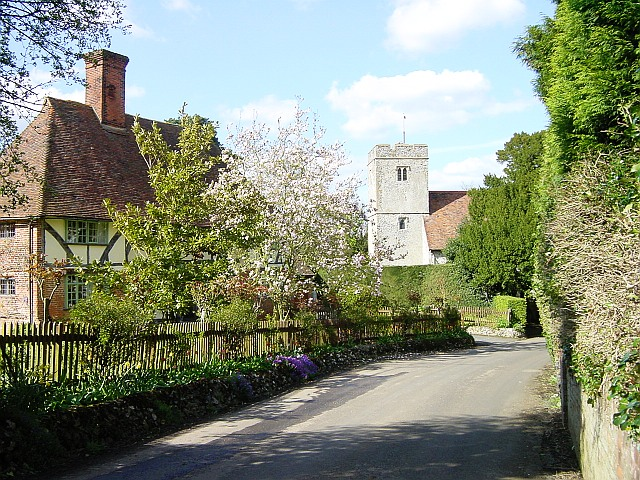
- Milstead in the Spring

- Location within Kent
- Population: 283 (2011 Census)
- District: Swale
- Shire county: Kent
- Region: South East
- Country: England
- Sovereign state: United Kingdom
- Post town: Sittingbourne
- Postcode district: ME9
- Police: Kent
- Fire: Kent
- Ambulance: South East Coast
- UK Parliament: Sittingbourne and Sheppey

Milstead is a village and civil parish in the borough of Swale in Kent, England. It is surrounded by the villages of Frinsted, Wichling, Doddington and Lynsted in Kent, England. It is the southernmost parish in the Sittingbourne area, and is approximately 3 miles (4.8 km) from Sittingbourne town centre, just south of the M2 motorway.

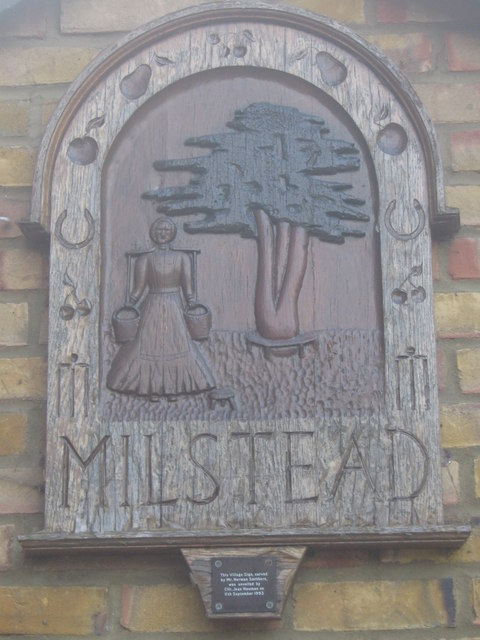
The village sign

According to Edward Hasted in 1798, "the parish is but small, containing about 800 acres (320 ha) of land, of which about 50 acres (20 ha) acres are woodland." He refers to it as 'Milsted'.

The parish was under the dominion of the Manor of Milton Regis in the reign of Edward I.

In 1870-72, according to John Marius Wilson's Imperial Gazetteer of England and Wales, the parish comprised 1,216 acres (492 ha). Its population was 245 and it had 43 houses.

Within the village is the Grade II listed Church of St Mary and the Holy Cross, within the diocese of Canterbury, and deanery of Sittingborne.

The village now contains around 80 houses and cottages of which nine are listed buildings, including 'Milstead Manor'.

On 27 September 1940 at 12.25pm, during the Battle of Britain, a Hawker Hurricane from 242 Squadron RAF, piloted by Flying Officer Michael Homer, crashed into a thatched cottage in the village, after being badly damaged by a Messerschmitt Bf 109. Flying Officer Homer flew with 242 Squadron based at RAF Duxford, commanded by Douglas Bader. Homer's body was taken from the wreck and buried in Godlingston Cemetery, Swanage, Dorset. His family planted a tree and mounted a plaque in his memory at the crash site. A memorial near Simel House, Minching Wood, which was unveiled in November 2007, is included as part of annual Remembrance Day services in the village.

The village has a reasonably large village hall which holds meetings for many clubs, such as woodturning and yoga, and also a monthly market. There is a village pub, the Red Lion, and a village school, 'Milstead and Frinsted Church of England Primary School'. The village once had a small post office, but it was closed and became a private house.

== See also ==
- Listed buildings in Milstead
