= List of windmills in Kent =

A list of all windmills and windmill sites which lie in the current Ceremonial county of Kent.

Extant (red) and former (blue) windmills in Kent.
1 Barham, 2 Benenden, 3 Bidborough, 4 Biddenden 5 Canterbury, 6 Charing, 7 Chillenden, 8 Chislet, 9 Cranbrook, 10 Eastry, 11 Edenbridge, 12 Copton, 13 Guston, 14 Herne, 15 Kingston, 16 Margate, 17 Meopham, 18 Northbourne, 19 Oare, 20 Ringwould, 21 Rodmersham Green, 22 Rolvenden, 23 Sandhurst, 24 Sandwich, 25 Sarre, 26 Sheerness, 27 Stanford, 28 Stelling Minnis, 29 St Margaret's Bay, 30 Sutton Valence, 31 West Kingsdown, 32 Whitstable, 33 Willesborough, 34 Wittersham, 35 Woodchurch.

== Locations ==
=== A ===
Location	Name of mill and grid reference	Type	Maps	First mention or built	Notes	Image
Acrise	Elham Mill; Elham Down Mill; Manor Mill	Post	1596; 1610; 1736; 1769	1596	Blown down in 1876.	
Acrise	Elham Mill	Smock		1878	Working until June 1916. Demolished 6 July 1919.	
Acrise	Acrise Mill	Post	1769	1769	Stood 7 furlongs (1.4 km) south east of Acrise Church.	
Adisham	Bekesbourne Mill	Smock		1843	Standing by 1843. Working until c. 1922. Burnt down 29 August 1933.	
Aldington	Aldington Mill; TR 056 363	Smock		1878	Working until c. 1908. Demolished 1910. Base survives, used as a store.	
Appledore	Horne Place Mill	Post	1596; 1736	1596	Stood 7 furlongs (1.4 km) north north east of Appledore Church.	
Appledore	Court Lodge Mill	Post	1596	1596	Stood 3 furlongs (600 m) south west of Appledore Church. Demolished late C18th.	
Appledore	Great Mill, Union Mill; TQ 953 304	Smock		1791	Demolished in 1909. Base survives, converted into a house.	
Appledore	TQ 953 303	Post			Moved from Playden, East Sussex.^{[Note 1]} Demolished 1900. Part of the roundhouse survives as part of a farm building.	
Ash (near Sandwich)	Mount Ephraim Mill	Post		1818	Moved from Woodnesborough. Blown down 21 October 1955.	
Ash (Sandwich)	(formed a pair with Mount Ephraim Mill)	Post			Demolished before 1879.	
Ash (Sandwich)	Ash Mill	Post	1736	1736	Stood north west of Knell Farm and 6 furlongs (1.2 km) north of Ash Church.	
Ashford	Regent's Place Mill	Smock		1870	Moved to Badlesmere, 1872.	

=== B ===
Location	Name of mill and grid reference	Type	Maps	First mention or built	Notes	Image
Badlesmere	Boundgate Mill; TR 010 532	Smock		1872	Working until 1921. Demolished 1938. Base survives, used as a store.	
Badlesmere Lees		Post	1695; 1736	1695	Stood 1 mile (1.6 km) south south west of Badlesmere Church.	
Bapchild	Bapchild Mill				Stood south of Watling Street, 4 furlongs (800 m) east of Bapchild Church. Standing by 1843. Demolished by 1865.	
Barfreston	Barfeston Mill		1769	1769	Standing in 1819.	
Barfreston	Barfreston Mill	Smock	1769	1769	Thought to have been standing c.1852. Base survived into the 1860s, converted to a house.	
Barham	Barham Downs Mill	Post	1596; 1695; 1736	1596		
Barham	Black Mill, Barham Downs Mill; TR 214 510	Smock		1834	Burnt down 3 March 1970. Derelict base survives.	
Barham				Early C18th	Stood 4 furlongs (800 m) east south east of Barham Church.	
Barham	Breach Downs Mill	Smock		1875	Working in 1878. Demolished c.1900.	
Barham	Derringstone Mill	Smock		1855	Stood near the site later occupied by Barham railway station. Moved to Margate in 1869.	
Barming	Barming Heath Mill			c.1800	Burnt down 1805.	
Barming	Barming Heath Mill		1829	1805	Stood 1 mile (1.6 km) north east of Barming Church. Standing in 1845, demolished c.1846, gone by 1853.	
Bearsted		Smock			Stood 3 furlongs (600 m) north west of Barming Church. Demolished by 1873.	
Benenden	Beacon Mill (south)				Demolished by 1850.	
Benenden	Beacon Mill (north); TQ 821 325	Smock	1821	1821	Working until 1921.	Media related to Beacon Mill, Benenden at Wikimedia Commons
Benenden	East End Mill	Post			Stood 2 miles 3 furlongs (3.8 km) east of Benenden Church. Demolished c.1870	
Bethersden	Old Mill; TQ 929 407	Post	1596; 1610; 1736; 1769	1555	Moved to Biddenden (Paul Sharpe's Mill).	
Bethersden	White Mill; TQ 929 407	Smock			Working until 1923. Blown down in 1937.	
Bethersden	Little Mill (1st site)	Smock			Six-sailed saw mill. Moved from Sandgate. Moved to 2nd site.	
Bethersden	Little Mill (2nd site)	Smock			Stood 2 furlongs (400 m) north north east of Bethersden Church, near the Black Mill. A six-sailed saw mill moved from a location within Bethersden village. Demolished c.1896.	
Bethersden	Black Mill; TQ 929 407	Smock		c.1886	Moved from Folkestone. A saw mill, latterly worked by a suction gas engine. Demolished by 1933, leaving the brick base, which was later demolished.	
Betteshanger			1596	1596	Stood north west of Betteshanger Church.	
Bicknor		Post	1769	1769	Stood 4 furlongs (800 m) south south west of Bicknor Church. Demolished before 1865.	
Bidborough	Bidborough Mill; TQ 561 435		1769	1769		
Bidborough	Bidborough Mill; TQ 561 435	Tower		1858	Working until c.1900. Converted to house in 2006.	Media related to Bidborough Windmill at Wikimedia Commons
Biddenden	Beacon Hill Mill, Paul Sharpe's Mill; TQ 8495 3706	Post	1736; 1769	1736	Moved from Bethersden. Working until 1882. Demolished 1912.	
Biddenden	Three Chimneys Mill, Cherry Clack Mill; Approximately TQ 815 378	Smock		1859	Moved to Punnetts Town, Sussex in 1859.	
Biddenden	Town Mill; TQ 85046 38171	Smock			Working until 1914. Was being lived in during the 1930s. Collapsed in 1946.	Media related to Town Mill, Biddenden at Wikimedia Commons
Birchington		Post	1414; 1596; 1695; 1719	1414	Stood east of the Birchington Church.	
Birchington	Dentdelion Mill		1610; 1695	1610	Stood north east of Birchington Church.	
Birchington	Quex Park Mill, Birchington Mill		1736; 1769	1736	Stood 7 furlongs (1.4 km) south east of Birchington Church. Possibly moved within Birchington (Hudson's Mill).	
Birchington	Grove End Mill		1769	1769	Stood 1 furlong (200 m) west north west of Birchington Church.	
Birchington	Seed Mill				Stood 3 furlongs (600 m) north of Birchington Church, near Birchington railway station.	
Birchington	Hudson's Mill	Smock			May have been moved from within Birchington. Raised c.1850. Working until 1891. Demolished c.1900.	
Blean	Glover's Old Mill; TR 125 607	Smock			Standing by 1843. Demolished early C20th. The base survives.	
Blean	Glover's New Mill	Smock		1868	Working until 1922. Demolished 1924.	
Blue Bell Hill	Blue Bell Hill Mill; TQ 747 621	Smock	1833	1833	Blown down July 1890. Base survives.	
Bobbing	Goord's Mill	Smock		1857	Stood 5 furlongs (1,000 m) south west of Bobbing Church. Demolished c.1902.	
Boughton Monchelsea	Haste Hill Mill	Smock			Stood 7 furlongs (1.4 km) north north west of Boughton Monchelsea Church. Burnt down in 1858.	
Boughton under Blean	Black Mill				Standing c.1850.	
Boughton under Blean					Demolished before c.1850.	
Boughton under Blean	Miles' Mill; TR 058 595	Smock		c.1793	Working until 1931, latterly by engine. Demolished in 1942 due to bomb damage. The base survives.	
Boughton under Blean	Richardson's Mill	Smock	1769	1769	Stood 7 furlongs (1.4 km) north east of Boughton Church. Had ceased working by 1925. Demolished during World War Two	
Boxley	The Pilgrim's Way Mill				Stood 4 furlongs (800 m) west of Boxley Church and south of the Pilgrim's Way. Demolished between 1876 and 1880.	
Boxley	Boxley Mill			1837	Stood 1 mile (1.6 km) south west of Boxley Church. Standing 1876, demolished by 1880.	
Brabourne	Brabourne Lees Mill	Smock		1867	Stood 1 mile (1.6 km) south west of Brabourne Church. Burnt down c.1871.	
Bredgar	Dean's Hill Mill	Smock	1769	1769	Stood 1 mile (1.6 km) west north west of Bredgar Church. Demolished c.1909.	
Bredhurst	Naylor's Mill; TQ 792 619	Smock		1845	Demolished c.1914.	
Brenchley	Pixot Hill Mill	Post	1769	1769	Stood 2 furlongs (400 m) north west of Brenchley Church. Standing in 1860.	
Brenchley	Keys Green Mill, Kippings Cross; TQ 647 397	Tower		1843	Working until c.1916 when tailwinded, cap and sails blown off. Demolished c. 1957, leaving a two-storey stump. – c. 1963.	
Brenzett	Brenzett Corner Mill	Post	1596; 1610	1596	Stood 5 furlongs (1,000 m) south west of Brenzett Church.	
Brenzett	Brenzett Corner Mill	Post		1776	Stood 5 furlongs (1,000 m) south west of Brenzett Church. Working into 1920s. Demolished 5 February 1925.	
Bridge	½ mile E of church	Post	1596; 1719	1596	Stood 2 furlongs (400 m) east of Bridge Church.	
Bridge	½ mile E of church	Smock		1829	Stood 2 furlongs (400 m) south east of Bridge Church.	
Bridge	Bridge Mill	Smock		1879	Stood 3 furlongs (600 m) north west of Bridge Church. Working until 1907. Demolished in 1955.	
Broadstairs	St Peter's Mill		1695; 1736	1695	Stood 6 furlongs (1.2 km) north north east of St Peter's Church, Broadstars. A mill is also marked on the 1819-43 Ordnance Survey map.^{[Note 2]}	
Broadstairs	Clairmont Mill	Post	1596; 1610; 1719; 1736; 1769	1596	Moved to Canterbury in 1858.	
Broadstairs	Bradstowe Mill; Pierremont Mill	Smock		1827	Working until 1907. Demolished in 1909.	
Brook	Spelder's Hill Mill	Smock		1820	Demolished c.1912. Base was standing in 1933.	

=== C ===
Location	Name of mill and grid reference	Type	Maps	First mention or built	Notes	Image
Canterbury (environs)					Standing c.1200	
Canterbury (environs)					Standing c.1200	
Canterbury	St Martin's Mill; TR 161 578	Tower		1817	Working until 1890, house converted in 1920.	
Canterbury	St Martin's Black Mill; TR 162 576	Smock		1816	Demolished 1868,	
Canterbury	St Lawrence Mill	Smock		1843	Stood 5 furlongs (1,000 m) south south west of St. Martin's Church, Canterbury. Burnt down 15 May 1873.	
Canterbury	Dane John Mill	Post		1731	1839	
Canterbury	Franciscan Gardens Mill	Smock		1846	Stood 1/5 mile (320m) north west of Canterbury Castle.	
Canterbury	St Thomas Hill Mill			1816	Standing in 1856.	
Challock	Challock Lees Mill; TR 0081 5105		1769	1769	Burnt down 1779	
Challock	Challock Lees Mill			1779	Stood 1 mile (1.6 km) north north west of Challock Church. Burnt down, date unknown.	
Challock	Challock Lees Mill; 2nd mill TR 0088 5093	Smock			Struck by lightning and burnt down, 10 February 1906.	
Charing	Charing Mill, Field Mill; TQ 957 503	Smock	1821	1821	Working until 1891. House conversion.	Media related to Charing Windmill at Wikimedia Commons
Charing	Charing Heath Mill	Smock			Stood 1 mile 4 furlongs (2.4 km) west of Charing Church. Demolished by 1870.	
Chartham	Hatch Green Mill				Stood 1 mile (1.6 km) north northwest of Chartham Church.	
Chatham	Upberry Mill, Gilbert's Mill, Lower Chatham Hill Mill; TQ 770 673	Smock	1596; 1695; 1736; 1769	1596	Working in 1885. Demolished autumn 1897.	
Chatham	Star Mill; Upper Chatham Hill Mill; Austin's Mill; TQ 778 666	Smock			Demolished in 1925.	
Chatham	Cherry Tree Hall Mill; TQ 759 674	Smock		1860	Blown down c.1875. Base survived as a store until c.1900.	
Chatham	Chalk Pit Hill Mill; TQ 760 670	Smock			Burnt down 1836.	
Chatham	Chalk Pit Hill Mill, Field's Mill; TQ 760 670	Smock		1837	Working until, and demolished in, 1887.	
Chatham	Chalk Pit Hill Mill (2nd mill)				Stood 2 furlongs (400 m) south of St. Paul's Church, Chatham. Marked on an Ordnance Survey map produced between 1819 and 1843.	
Chatham	New Road Mill, Feather Mill; TQ 754 678	Smock		Pre 1851	Demolished c. 1890,	
Chatham	Ordnance Place Mill, Bacon's Mill, Belsey's Mill; TQ 753 673	Smock		1845	Used for grinding corn and pumping water. Demolished c. 1900. Base was standing in 1933, but had been demolished by 1973.	
Chatham	Ordnance Place Mill, Willis's Mill; TQ 753 673	Smock		1839	Demolished c. 1875.	
Chatham	Luton Mill, Mainwaring's Mill; TQ 772 658	Smock		1848	Moved from Slough, Buckinghamshire. Burnt down autumn 1887.	
Chatham	Luton mill (2nd mill)				Stood 4 furlongs (800 m) south west of Luton Church. Formed a pair with Luton Mill.	
Chevening	Chevening Mill			1824	Stood 4 furlongs (800 m) south of Chevening Church. Standing in 1837, demolished c.1840.	
Chilham	Chilham Windmill			Mid C19th.	stood 1 mile 4 furlongs (2.4 km) north north east of Chilham Church.	
Chillenden	Chillenden Mill; TR 268 546	Post	1695; 1736; 1769	1695	Blown down in 1868.	
Chillenden	Chillenden Mill; TR 268 543	Post		1868	Collapsed 26 November 2003. Windmill World	
Chillenden	Chillenden Mill; TR 268 543	Post		2005	Rebuild of mill blown down in 2003.	Media related to Chillenden Windmill at Wikimedia Commons
Chislet			c.1200			
Chislet	Chislet Mill; TR 224 679	Smock		1744	Burnt down 15 October 2005. Windmill World	
Chislet	Chislet Mock Mill; TR 224 679	Smock		2012	Residential mock mill.	
Cliffe	Dance's Mill	Smock	1769	1769	Burnt down c.1885.	
Cliftonville	Gougher's Mill (east)	Smock		1839	Demolished November 1875	
Cliftonville	Gougher's Mill (middle)	Smock		1839	Burnt down after 1839	
Cliftonville	Gougher's Mill (west)			1836	Burnt down 27 February 1836.	
Cliftonville	Gougher's Mill (west)	Smock		1839	Demolished November 1875	
Cobham	Cobham Hall Mill	Post	1596; 1610	1596	Stood 4 furlongs (800 m) north of Cobham Hall.	
Cobham	Darnley's Mill; TQ 672 684	Smock		1852	Struck by lightning and burnt down in 1903. Base survives, house converted.	
Cowden	Polefields Mill				Stood about 4 furlongs (800 m) north of Cowden Church. Demolished by 1843.	
Cranbrook	Windmill Hill Mill	Smock	1736; 1769	1736	Stood 2 furlongs (400 m) west north west of Cranbrook Church. Moved to Sissinghurst (Crampton's Mill) c. 1814.	
Cranbrook	Satin's Hill Mill		1769	1769	Stood 1 mile 5 furlongs (2.6 km) north east of Cranbrook Church. Gone by early C19th.	
Cranbrook	Cranbrook Common Mill	Smock		1872	Stood 1 mile 6 furlongs (2.8 km) north north east of Cranbrook church. Working until 1876. Demolished 9 August 1901.	
Cranbrook	Union Mill; TQ 779 359	Smock		1814	Working until 1957, restored 1958-60. Tallest smock mill in the United Kingdom.	Media related to Union Mill, Cranbrook at Wikimedia Commons
Crayford	May Place Mill	Post	1769	1769	Stood 1 mile 2 furlongs (2.0 km) north of Bexley Church. Working until 1858. Demolished c.1870.	
Cudham	Biggin Hill Mill, Pimlico Mill	Post	1829	1809	Stood 1 mile 4 furlongs (2.4 km) south west of Cudham Church. Demolished in 1885.	

=== D ===
Location	Name of mill and grid reference	Type	Maps	First mention or built	Last mention or demise	Image
Dartford	Brent Mill	Smock		1799	Stood 1 mile (1.6 km) east south east of Dartford Church. Working until 1886. Demolished c. 1901.	
Dartford	Hall's Engineering Works, Hythe Street; TQ 542 745			1795	Demolished c. 1801.	
Deal	Upper Deal Mill	Post	1596; 1769	1596	Stood 4 furlongs (800 m) south of Upper Deal Church. Standing in 1840.	
Deal	Upper Deal Mill	Smock		1855	Stood 4 furlongs (800 m) south of Upper Deal Church. Demolished March 1929.	
Deal	Wellington Mill	Smock			Stood 3 furlongs (600 m) west of Deal Castle. Demolished c.1890.	
Deal	Lower Deal Mill	Smock	1736; 1769	1736	Stood 4 furlongs (800 m) south west of Sandown Castle. Demolished c.1870.	
Deal	North End Mill, Great Mill	Smock		1767	Stood 4 furlongs (800 m) south west of Sandown castle. Burnt down c.1896.	
Deal	Sandown Castle Mill		1829	1829	Stood 4 furlongs (800 m) south of Sandown Castle.	
Deal	Sandown Mill	Post	1695	1695	Stood 2 furlongs (400 m) south of Sandown Castle.	
Deal	Sandown Mill	Smock			Stood 2 furlongs (400 m) south of Sandown Castle. Demolished c.1892.	
Deal	Walmer Road Mill	Smock		1844	Stood 1 furlong (200 m) south of Deal Castle. Demolished early 1850s.	
Denton	Denton		1736; 1769	1736	Stood 3 furlongs (600 m) north east of Denton Church.	
Detling	Detling Mill	Smock		1864	Stood 6 furlongs (1.2 km) north east of Detling Church. Standing in 1866, demolished by February 1868.	
Doddington	Elvey's Mill, Jarvis's Mill; TQ 93395 57405	Smock		c. 1820	Demolished 1937.	
Dover	Dover Castle, Mill Tower			Late C13th	Tower 22 had a windmill erected on it during the time of Stephen de Pencester (d.1303). The mill was demolished during the Anglo-American War under orders from the Ordnance Board.	
Dover	Buckland Brewery	Smock		1798	A pumping mill. Demolished in the 1890s.	
Dover	Infectious Diseases Hospital	Titt iron wind engine		1893		
Dymchurch	Dymchurch Mill	Smock	1829	1829	Moved 200 yards (180 m) to a new site within Dymchurch at an unknown date.	
Dymchurch	Dymchurch Mill				Stood 1 mile (1.6 km) south west of Dymchurch Church. Working until c.1882. Demolished c. 1905.	

=== E ===
Location	Name of mill and grid reference	Type	Maps	First mention or built	Notes	Image
Eastchurch	Eastchurch Mill	Post	1596; 1610	1596	Stood to the south west of Eastchurch Church.	
East Farleigh	East Farleigh Mill	Smock			Stood 1 mile 2 furlongs (2.0 km) south east of East Farleigh Church. Burnt down in the 1830s or earlier.	
East Langdon	Martin Mill; TR 34205 46515	Smock	1769	1769	Demolished c. 1954	
Eastling	Eastling Mill; TQ 958 555	Smock		1823	Demolished c. 1912,	
Eastry		Post	1596; 1695; 1736	1596	Standing in 1839.	
Eastry	Lower Mill	Smock	1769	1743	Demolished 1926.	
Eastry	Upper Mill; TR 304 545	Smock	1769	1769	Working by wind until 1913, then by suction gas engine until 1959. House conversion.	Media related to Eastry Windmill at Wikimedia Commons
Eastry	(3rd mill)	Smock			Stood about 4 furlongs (800 m) south west of Eastry Church. Standing in 1833, burnt down, date unknown.	
Eastry	(4th mill)			Mid C19th	Stood about 4 furlongs (800 m) south west of Eastry Church.	
Eastry	Eastry Mill		1736	1736	Stood north of Eastry Church.	
Edenbridge	Edenbridge Mill; TQ 444 457	Tower		1815	Working until 1886. House converted 1990s.	Media related to Edenbridge Windmill at Wikimedia Commons
Egerton	(near church)	Smock		1818	Moved to Stone Hill, c.1818.	
Egerton	Stone Hill Mill; TQ 908 471	Smock		c.1818	Blown down 2 December 1919. Base survives, used as a store.	
Elham	Elham Mill	Post	1769	1769	Stood 2 furlongs (400 m) north of Elham Church. Blown down, date unknown.	
Elham	Bladblean Mill		1769	1769	Stood 1 mile 5 furlongs (2.6 km) north of Elham Church.	
Elham	Cullen's Hill Mill	Smock		c. 1820	Stood 1 furlong (200 m) north of Elham Church. Working until c.1918, demolished in 1925 .	
Elmley			1695	1695	Stood south east of Elmley Chapel.	
Elmsted	Itinge Mill		1736; 1769	1736	Stood 1 mile (1.6 km) north of Elmsted Church.	
Elmsted	Itinge Mill, Folly Town Mill	Post		c. 1865	Stood 1 mile (1.6 km) north of Elmsted Church. Moved from Petham (Mark's Folly Mill) c.1865. Collapsed c.1875.	
Elmsted	Stone Street Mill, The George Seed Mill (west)	Smock			Stood 1 mile 2 furlongs (2.0 km) east of Elmsted Church. Demolished c.1868 .	
Elmsted	Stone Street Mill, The George Seed Mill (east)	Smock	1769	1769	Stood 1 mile 2 furlongs (2.0 km) east of Elmsted Church. Demolished c.1876.	
Elmsted	Bodsham Green Mill; TR 106 456	Smock			Stood 6 furlongs (1,200 m) north west of Elmsted Church. Working until 1890. Demolished c. 1895. Base survives, used as a store.	
Eythorne	Upper Eythorne Mill		1769	1769	Stood 1 mile 2 furlongs (2.0 km) north east of Sibertswold Church.	

=== F ===
Location	Name of mill and grid reference	Type	Maps	First mention or built	Notes	Image
Farningham	Farningham Mill	Smock		1820	Moved to West Kingsdown in 1880.	
Faversham	Forbes Road Mill, Gravel Pit Mill	Smock		1843	Stood 6 furlongs (1.2 km) south west of Faversham Church. Demolished c.1910.	
Faversham	Hangman's Lane Mill	Smock		1843	Stood 5 furlongs (1,000 m) south west of Faversham Church. Demolished c.1855.	
Faversham	Copton Mill; TR 014 596	Tower		1863	A pumping mill, tower stands, used as a store.	
Fawkham	Fawkham Mill		1719	1719	Stood 6 furlongs (1.2 km) east of Fawkham Church.	
Folkestone	Cheriton Mill, Ashley Mill; TR 205 373	Smock		1877	Moved from Hythe. Working by wind until 1902, then by engine. Demolished in 1919, brick base built upon and used as a store.	
Folkestone	Cheriton Mill			1843	Stood 5 furlongs (1,000 m) east north east of Cheriton Church. Standing 1869, later burnt down.	
Folkestone	Cheriton Mill	Smock			Moved to Lympne.	
Folkestone	Folkestone Mill; Foord Road Mill		1769	1769	Stood 4 furlongs (800 m) north of Folkestone Church and 4 furlongs (800 m) east of Folkestone Central railway station. Standing in 1833.	
Folkestone	(on coast)	Post	1769	1769	Stood 4 furlongs (800 m) south east of Foord Road Mill.	
Folkestone	Dawson's Mill	Smock		1843	Stood 2 furlongs (400 m) south east of Folkestone Central railway station. Moved to Bethersden (Black Mill) in 1885.	
Folkestone	Old Mill	Smock				
Frindsbury	Quarry Mill; TQ 747 695	Post	1596; 1610; 1736; 1769	1596	Burnt down c.1850 .	
Frindsbury	Prospect Hill Mill, Little Mill, Manwaring's Mill; TQ 736 703	Smock	1769	1769	Struck by lightning and consequently demolished c.1886.	
Frindsbury	Prospect Hill Mill, Great Mill, Rose's Mill; TQ 736 703	Smock		1843	Demolished c.1890. Base converted to a pair of cottages, which survive.	
Frindsbury	Kimmins' Mill; TQ 741 701	Smock		1843	Demolished c.1865.	
Frindsbury	Frindsbury Mill, House Mill; TQ 741 701	Smock		1843	Demolished 1931.	
Frinsted	Frinsted Mill		1736	1736	Stood north of Frinsted Church.	
Frittenden	Maplehurst Windmill				Stood 7 furlongs (1.4 km) north west of Frittenden Church. Demolished by 1836.	
Frittenden	Sinkhurst Green Mill; TQ 8127 4252	Post	1829	1829	Possibly moved here from an unknown location. Working until the First World War. Demolished early 1950s.	

=== G ===
Location	Name of mill and grid reference	Type	Maps	First mention or built	Notes	Image
Gillingham	Stedman's Mill; TQ 7712 6905	Smock		1874	Demolished c.1888.	
Gillingham	Stedman's Mill; TQ 7715 6904	Smock		1839	Moved from Snodland. Struck by lightning and burnt down 28 June 1892	
Gillingham	Charter Street mill Huggins' Mill				Stood 3 furlongs (600 m) north of St Mark's Church, Gillingham. Burnt down, date unknown.	
Gillingham	Mulberry Tree Place Mill; TQ 797 687				Stood 2 furlongs (400 m) east of the Hastings Arms PH.	
Gillingham	Friday's Mill; TQ 798 686	Smock		1839	Demolished c.1896 .	
Goodnestone		Post	1736	1736	Stood south south west of Goodnestone Church.	
Goudhurst	Kilndown Mill	Post		1770	Moved to Nutley, Sussex c. 1817.	
Goudhurst	Town Mill; TQ 7249 3794	Smock		c. 1803	Working until late 1870s. Demolished c.1890.	
Gravesend	Windmill Hill Mill	Post	1596	1596	Stood 5 furlongs (1,000 m) south of Gravesend church. Burnt down 1763.	
Gravesend	Windmill Hill Mill (south)	Post	1769	1769	Stood 5 furlongs (1,000 m) south of Gravesend Church. Caught fire and remains demolished 1787.	
Gravesend	Windmill Hill Mill (south)	Post		c.1787	Woking until 1856. Later converted to a camera obscura. Burnt down 17 May 1900 to celebrate the Relief of Mafeking.	
Gravesend	Windmill Hill Mill (north)	Post	1769	1769	Stood 5 furlongs (1,000 m) south of Gravesend church, and 120 yards (110 m) north east of the southerly mill.	
Gravesend	Denton Mill; Sulphur Mill			1812	Stood 1 mile (1,600 m) east of Gravesend church and 150 yards (140 m) west of the Ship and Lobster PH. Demolished c.1872.	
Great Chart	Saw mill	Smock		1888	Stood 1 furlong (200 m) north east of Great Chart Church. A six-sailed saw mill moved from Pluckley. Demolished in 1928, leaving the base standing. The base burnt down in the 1960s.	
Great Mongeham	Mongeham Mill		1596; 1695; 1736	1596	Stood south west of Great Mongeham church.	
Guilton	Guilton Mill; Ash Mill; TR 283 584	Smock			Demolished October 1923. Base remains, house converted.	
Guilton		Post	1769	1769	Stood 3 furlongs (600 m) west of Ash Church. Standing in 1854.	
Guilton		Smock			Stood 3 furlongs (600 m) west of Ash Church. Standing in 1854.	
Guilton	Good Intent Mill; TR 283 584	Smock		1854	Demolished c.1918.	
Guston	Swingate Mill; TR 334 444	Tower		1849	Working until 1959, House converted.	

=== H ===
Location	Name of mill and grid reference	Type	Maps	First mention or built	Notes	Image
Halstead		Smock		1820	Demolished in 1829.	
Harbledown	The Old Black Mill	Smock		1780	Working until 1890s. Demolished 9 July 1913.	
Hartley			1719	1719	Stood about halfway between Midley Church and Hartley Church.	
Hartlip	Friday's Mill; TQ 842 650	Smock	1596; 1736; 1769	1596	Stood 4 furlongs (800 m) north north east of Hartlip Church. Burnt down June 1887.	
Hastingleigh	Staple Lees Mill; Brown Town Mill	Post	1736	1736	Stood 6 furlongs (1.2 km) north west of Hastingleigh Church.	
Hawkhurst	Old Conghurst		1719	1719	Stood south of Hawkhurst Church, near Old Conghurst.	
Hawkhurst	Hawkhurst Horn	Post	1736; 1769	1736	Stood 4 furlongs (800 m) mprtj west of Hawkhurst Church. Said to have beenmoved to High Street site.	
Hawkhurst	Pipsden	Post	1736	1736	Stood 1 mile 30 chains (2.2 km) north east of Hawkhurst Church. Standing in 1874.	
Hawkhurst	High Street	Post			Stood 7 furlongs (1.4 km) north north west of Hawkhurst Church. Said to have been moved from another site in Hawkhurst. Demolished by 1880.	
Hawkhurst	Gun Green Mill	Post			Stood 1 mile 3 furlongs (2.2 km) north east of Hawkhurst Church.	
Hawkhurst	Gun Green Mill	Smock			Stood 1 mile 3 furlongs (2.2 km) north east of Hawkhurst Church. Moved to Four Throws c.1870.	
Hawkhurst	Four Throws Mill; Nightingale's Mill	Smock		c.1870	Stood 1 mile 1 furlong (1.8 km) east of Hawkhurst Church. Moved from Gun Green c.1870. Demolished in 1926.	
Hawkinge	Old Mill	Smock		1799	Stood 2 furlongs (400 m) north east of Hawkinge Church. Working until 1902. Collapsed in 1962.	
Hawkinge	Drellingore Mill	Smock			Stood 1 mile 4 furlongs (2.4 km) north east of Hawkinge Church.Moved to Ringwould (Ripple Mill) c.1810.	
Headcorn	Black Mill; Crows's Foot Mill; TQ 827 447	Smock	1769	1769	Demolished c.1910.	
Headcorn	White Mill; TQ 831 446	Smock		1819	Was working in 1933. Demolished 8 July 1952.	
Herne	Beacon Hill Mill	Post	1596; 1610; 1695; 1736; 1769	1511	Demolished c.1781.	
Herne	Herne Windmill; TR 185 665	Smock		1781	Working by wind until 1952, then by electric motor until 1980. Restored.	Media related to Herne Windmill at Wikimedia Commons
Herne Bay	The Bay Mill; TR 180 660	Smock		1839	Demolished in 1878.	
Higham	Rose's Mill; TQ 719 715	Smock		1760	Demolished April 1921, base remains standing.	
High Halden	High Halden Mill	Post	1736; 1769	1736	Stood near the Dragon PH, moved within High Halden c.1800.	
High Halden	High Halden Mill; TQ 8970 3727	Post		c.1800	Working until c.1918, demolished by 1933 leaving the roundhouse, which had been demolished by 1973.	
Hildenborough	Watt's Cross mill TQ 558 494	Smock		1812	Working until 1910. Demolished in 1961, derelict base remains.	
Hoath	Fuller's Mill	Smock		1843	Stood 4 furlongs (800 m) north east of Hoath Church. Working until 1912. Collapsed on 18 July 1919.	
Hoo	Hoo Common Mill	Post	1769	1769	Stood 1 mile (1.6 km) north west of Hoo church. Demolished c.1799.	
Hoo	Hoo Common Mill; Ballard's Mill	Smock		1799	Stood 1 mile (1.6 km) north west of Hoo Church. Working until 1880s. Standing in 1905, demolished by 1933.	
Hythe		Post		1809	Stood 4 furlongs (800 m) east of St. Leonard's Church, Hythe and 2 furlongs (400 m) south south east of Hythe railway station. Moved to Ruckinge in the 1830s.	
Hythe	Stade Street	Smock	1829	1829	Stood 3 furlongs (600 m) south west of St. Leonard's Church, Hythe. Standing in 1889.	
Hythe	Stade Street	Smock	1829	1829	Stood 3 furlongs (600 m) south west of St. Leonard's Church, Hythe. Moved to Cheriton (Ashley Mill) in 1877, base was left standing.	
Hythe	Stade Street	Smock	1829	1829	Stood 3 furlongs (600 m) south west of St. Leonardd's Church, Hythe. Standing in 1829, demolished by 1877.	
Hythe		Smock		1860s	Demolished in the early 1860s'	

=== I ===
Location	Name of mill and grid reference	Type	Maps	First mention or built	Last mention or demise	Image
Ide Hill				1819	Stood near the west side of Ide Hill Church. Burnt down in 1836.	
Ide Hill		Post		1838	Stood 100 yards (91 m) east of Ide Hill Church. Demolished in the 1890s.	
Isle of Grain	Grain		1596; 1610	1596	Stood near the village of Grain.	
Isle of Grain	All Hallows		1769	1769	Stood 1 mile 2 furlongs (2.0 km) east south east of Allhallows Church.	
Isle of Grain	St Peter's		1769	1769	Stood 2 miles (3.2 km) south west of St Peter's Church. Standing in 1819.	
Iwade	Iwade Windpump; TR 914 688	Hollow Post			Windmill World	

=== K ===
Location	Name of mill and grid reference	Type	Maps	First mention or built	Notes	Image
Kemsing				1275	1275	
Kennington	Kennington Lees Mill	Post	1769	1769	Stood 2 furlongs (400 m) north west of Kennington Church. Demolished c.1878.	
Kennington	Wind, Steam and Water Mill; TR 032 454	Smock		1813	Working until 1890s. Demolished in 1952. Base survives, used as a store.	
Kingsdown					Stood 6 furlongs (1.2 km) north north east of Kingsdown Church. Demolished c. 1850s.	
Kingsnorth	Millbank Place Mill				Stood 6 furlongs (1.2 km) north north west of Kingsnorth Church.	
Kingsnorth	Kingsnorth Mill; TR 001 391	Smock		1878	Standing in 1892, demolished by 1933. Base survives, converted to house.	
Kingston	Reed Mill; TR 174 499	Tower		1872	Working until 28 March 1915. House converted 2009-10.	
Knockholt	Knockholt Mill	Tower		1824	Stood about 1 mile (1.6 km) east of Knockholt Church.Working until 1882. Demolished c.1886.	
Knockholt	Stoneings Mill	Post		1824	A miniature mill, some remains were in situ in 1956.	

=== L ===
Location	Name of mill and grid reference	Type	Maps	First mention or built	Notes	Image
Lamberhurst	Windmill Farm				Stood 1 mile (1.6 km) north west of Lamberhurst Church. Gone by 1769.	
Lamberhurst	Saw mill TQ 675 360	Smock		c. 1890	c. 1890	
Lamberhurst	Sussex Mill					
Leeds	Brogden Mill	Smock		1843	Stood 4 furlongs (800 m) west south west of Leeds Church. Demolished in 1883.	
Leigh	Stocks Green Mill; TQ 558 478	Smock		1928	Moved from Sidley, East Sussex. Collapsed c. 1963	
Lenham				12th century	12th century	
Lenham	Town mill	Smock			Stood 2 furlongs (400 m) south west of Lenham Church. Demolished c.1843.	
Lenham	Town Mill	Smock		c. 1843	Stood 2 furlongs (400 m) south west of Lenham Church. Burnt down in 1904.	
Lenham	Downs Court Hill Mill			1828	Stood 1 mile 1 furlong (1.8 km) east north east of Lenham Church. Burnt down before 1881.	
Lenham	Lenham Heath Mill; TQ 913 498	Smock	1769	1760	Demolished in 1925. Base survives, used as a store.	
Lower Stoke						
Lower Stoke	(2nd mill)	Smock			Standing in 1905, gone by 1933	
Luddesdown	Henley Downs Mill		1829	1829	Stood 2 furlongs (400 m) north west of Luddesdown Church. Blown downin 1856.	
Lydd			1596; 1610; 1769	1596	Stood 2 furlongs (400 m) north west of Lydd Church.	
Lydd	Old Mill	Post	1596; 1610; 1769	1596	Stood 3 furlongs (600 m) south west of Lydd Church. Burnt down 26 February 1900.	
Lydd	New Mill	Smock		1805	Stood 3 furlongs (600 m) north east of Lydd Church. Working until 1920, latterly by steam engine. Burnt down 22 September 1927.	
Lyminge		Post	1736; 1769	1736	Stood 3 furlongs (600 m) north west of Lyminge Church. Standing in 1819, blown down, date unknown.	
Lyminge	Black Mill	Smock		1843	Stood 3 furlongs (600 m) north of Lyminge Church. Burnt down in September 1891.	
Lyminge	White Mill	Smock		c.1852	Stood 3 furlongs (600 m) north of Lyminge Church. Demolished in 1920.	
Lympne		Smock	1829	1829	Stood 3 furlongs (600 m) west north west of Lympne Church. Moved from Cheriton, Folkestone. Blown down in November 1891.	
Lynsted	Claxfield, Seed Mill				Stood 7 furlongs (1.4 km) north of Lynsted Church. Gone by the 1850s.	
Lynsted	Union Mill	Smock	1736	1736	Stood 7 furlongs (1,400 m) south east of Lynsted Church. Standing in 1870, demolished "a few years later".	
Lynsted	Champion's Mill; TQ 944 613	Smock		1843	Standing in 1933. Gone by 1940. Base survives, used as a store.	

=== M ===
Location	Name of mill and grid reference	Type	Maps	First mention or built	Notes	Image
Maidstone	Sandling Road; TQ 758 561	Smock	1819	1819	Gone by 1834. Site now occupied by Maidstone East railway station.	
Margate	Humber's Mill; Chamber's Mill		1695; 1719; 1736	1695	Stood 2 miles (3.2 km) north west of St Lawrence Church, Ramsgate.	
Margate			1695; 1719	1695	Stood 7 furlongs (1.4 km) south east of Margate Church. Gone by 1847.	
Margate	Drapers Mill; Old Mill; TR 363 700	Smock		c. 1847	Windmill World	Media related to Draper's Mill, Margate at Wikimedia Commons
Margate	Little Draper's Mill	Smock		c.1869	Stood 7 furlongs (1.4 km) south east of Margate Church. Moved from Barham. Standing in 1903, gone by 1933, base survived then.	
Margate	Pumping Mill	Tower		1872	Stood 7 furlongs (1.4 km) south east of Margate church. Five-sailed pumping mill. Standing in 1894, gone by 1933.	
Margate	Town Mill		1719	1719	Stood 3 furlongs (600 m) north west of Draper's Mill. Working in 1889.	
Margate	Nayland Mill			1801	Stood 4 furlongs (800 m) west of Margate Church. Said to have been moved within Margate to site later occupied by Draper's Mill.	
Margate	Hooper's Mill	Horizontal		1791	Demolished c. 1828	
Meopham	Meopham Mill; TQ 639 653	Smock		1801	Working by wind until 1929, then by engine until 1965. Restored.	Media related to Meopham Windmill at Wikimedia Commons
Meopham	Priestwood Mill		1769	1769	Stood 1 mile (1.6 km) south south east of Meopham Church. Demolished in the 1850s.	
Milton	Chalkwell Mill	Smock		1843	Stood 6 furlongs (1.2 km) west of Sittingbourne Church. Standing in 1878.	
Milton Regis	Meade Mill	Smock		1878	Stood 2 furlongs (400 m) north west of Milton Regis Church. Struck by lightning and burnt down 15 August 1954.	
Minster, Sheppey	Pigtail Corner Mill		1596; 1610	1596	Stood 2 furlongs (400 m) east of Minster Church.	
Minster, Sheppey	Pigtail Corner Mill	Smock	1695; 1769	1695	Stood 2 furlongs (400 m) east of Minster Church. Working in 1878. Burnt down in 1889.	
Minster, Sheppey				1819	Stood 1 mile (1.6 km) south east of Minster Church.	
Minster, Thanet	Minster Mill	Post	1596; 1610; 1695; 1719	1596	Stood 1 mile 4 furlongs (2.4 km) north east of Minster Church.	
Minster, Thanet	Minster Mill	Smock			Stood 1 mile 4 furlongs (2.4 km) north east of Minster Church. Standing in 1882.	
Minster, Thanet	Minster Mill	Smock	1769	1769	Stood 1 mile 4 furlongs (2.4 km) north east of Minster Church. Standing in 1875, gone by 1882.	
Molash	Molash Mill; TR 02180 51955	Smock		1843	Stood 4 furlongs (800 m) south west of Molash Church. Standing in 1877.	
Monkton				1198	1205	
Monkton	Monkton Mill		1596; 1610; 1695; 1719; 1736; 1769	1596	Stood 1 mile 4 furlongs (2.4 km) north east of Monkton Church. Said to have been moved to Sarre.	
Murston	Murston Mill				Stood 7 furlongs (1.4 km) north east of Murston Church.	

=== N ===
Location	Name of mill and grid reference	Type	Maps	First mention or built	Notes	Image
Newchurch	Newchurch Mill; TR 058 313	Tower		1810	Demolished c.1906. Stump remains.	
Newington, Thanet	Newington Mill	Smock		1843	Stood 4 furlongs (800 m) north of St. Lawrence Church, Ramsgate. Standing in 1933.	
Newington, Swale	Newington Mill	Smock		1843	Stood 3 furlongs (600 m) south west of Newington Church. Standing in 1884, gone by 1933.	
Newnham	Newnham Mill	Smock		1843	Stood 30 chains (600 m) north of Newnham Church. Dismantled 1876, tower burnt 5 November 1876.	
New Romney		Post	1596	1500	Stood 3 furlongs (600 m) north north west of New Romney Church.	
New Romney	New Romney Mill; Old Mill	Smock	1769	1769	Stood 3 furlongs (600 m) north north west of New Romney Church, Standing in 1903, gone by 1933.	
New Romney			1769	1769	Stood 5 furlongs (1.0 km) north east of New Romney Church.	
Nonington	Nonington Mill		1596; 1695; 1736	1596	Stood 1 mile 1 furlong (1.8 km) east south east of Nonington Church.	
Nonington	Nonington mill	Smock		1843	Stood 1 mile 1 furlong (1.8 km) east south east of Nonington Church. Working by wind until 1905, then by engine. Burnt down 9 May 1965.	
Nonington	Seed Mill	Smock			Stood 1 mile 1 furlong (1.8 km) east south east of Nonington Church and 200 yards (180 m) south east of Nonington Mill. Demolished in 1905 =.	
Northbourne			1596; 1736	1596	Stood 4 furlongs (800 m) south west of Northbourne Church.	
Northbourne	Old Mill	Smock	1769	1769	Stood 4 furlongs (800 m) west north west of Northbourne Church. Demolished 15 February 1957.	
Northbourne	New Mill; TR 331 521	Smock		1848	Working by wind until 1949, then by electric motor until 1957. House converted in 1976.	Media related to New Mill, Northbourne at Wikimedia Commons
Northfleet	The Hive				Stood 2 furlongs (400 m) west north west of Northfleet Church.	
Northfleet	Stone Bridge				Stood 6 furlongs (1.2 km) north west of Northfleet Church.	
Northfleet	Stone Bridge (2nd mill)			1843	Stood 6 furlongs (1.2 km) north west of Northfleet Church. Standing in the 1850s.	
Northfleet	Fiveash Mill			1843	Stood 30 chains (600 m) north of Perry Street Church. Demolished in 1900s.	
Northfleet	Rosherville	Tower		1832	Stood 5 furlongs (1,000 m) east south east of Northfleet Church. Working until c.1894. Demolished c.1916.	
Northwood	Thanet Mill; TR 370 670	Tower		1843	Demolished in 1961.	

=== O ===
Location	Name of mill and grid reference	Type	Maps	First mention or built	Notes	Image
Oare	Oare Windmill; TR 009 625	Tower	1821	1821	House converted 1963.	
Oare	Oare Marshes; TR 012 628	smock			A windpump, standing derelict in 1933. Some remnants extant in 1973.	
Old Romney		Post		1190		
Old Romney		Post	1596; 1610; 1736	1596	Stood 4 furlongs (800 m) west of Old Romney Church.	
Old Romney		Post	1596; 1736	1596	Stood 1 mile (1.6 km) north west of Old Romney Church.	
Ospringe	Water Lane Mill; TR 014 596	Smock		1878	Demolished c.1915.	
Ospringe	Union House				Stood 6 furlongs (1.2 km) north of Ospringe Church.	
Ospringe	Union House (2nd mill)	Smock		1843	Stood 6 furlongs (1.2 km) north of Ospringe Church. Burnt down c.1910.	

=== P ===
Location	Name of mill and grid reference	Type	Maps	First mention or built	Notes	Image
Pegwell Bay				1828	Demolished c. 1830.	
Penenden Heath	Penenden Heath Mill	Smock		1800	Stood 1 mile 2 furlongs (2.0 km) south of Boxley Church. Moved to Folkestone (Dawson's Mill) c. 1840.	
Petham	Mill Downs Mill	Post	1829	1829	Stood close to Petham Church. Moved to Stelling Minnis (Brambleton Mill) c.1850.	
Petham	Mark's Folly Mill; Duckpit Mill	Post		1865	Stood 1 mile (1.6 km) south west of Petham Church. Moved to Elmsted (Itinge Mill) c.1865.	
Petham	Chequers' Mill	Smock		1821	Stood 3 furlongs (600 m) east of Petham Church. Burnt down 1 April 1900.	
Pluckley	Pluckley Mill; TQ 9240 4563	Smock		1872	Working until 1916. Burnt down 1939.	
Pluckley	Padgham's Mill	Smock			A six-sailed saw mill. Moved to Great Chart.	
Postling	Postling Mill	Post	1596; 1719	1596	Stood to the north west of Postling Church.	
Preston next Faversham	Preston Mill	Smock		1843	Stood 4 furlongs (800 m) south of Preston Church. Working until 1919, latterly by steam engine. Demolished in 1943.	
Preston next Wingham	Old Mill; Dunn's Mill; TR 257 608	Smock		1778	Working by wind until 1916, then by engine into 1930s. Demolished in 1959, leaving the base.	
Preston next Wingham	New Mill; Solly's Mill	Smock		1852	Stood 1 mile (1.6 km) north west of Elmstone Church. Demolished in 1912.	

=== Q ===
Location	Name of mill and grid reference	Type	Maps	First mention or built	Notes	Image
Queenborough	Queenborough Mill			1843	Stood close to, and east of, Queenborough Church. Burnt down before 1860.	

=== R ===
Location	Name of mill and grid reference	Type	Maps	First mention or built	Notes	Image
Ramsgate	St. Lawrence		1596; 1719; 1769	1596	Stood 4 furlongs (800 m) east of St Lawrence Church, Ramsgate.	
Ramsgate	Grange Road Mill		1719	1719	Stood 4 furlongs (800 m) south south east of St Lawrence Church, Ramsgate. Standing in 1819, gone by 1872.	
Ramsgate	Grange Road Mill	Smock		1843	Stood 4 furlongs (800 m) south south east of St Lawrence Church, Ramsgate. Standing in 1905, demolished by 1930, when the base was standing. Base demolished by 1973.	
Ramsgate	Hereson Mill	Smock		1872	Stood 2 furlongs (400 m) inland of the East Cliff. Burnt down c.1890.	
Reculver				1195		
Richborough			1769	1769	Stood 1 mile (1.6 km) north east of Richborough Castle. Standing in 1787.	
Richborough			1769	1769	Stood 1 mile (1.6 km) north east of Richborough Castle. Standing in 1787.	
Ringwould	TR 362 490	Post	1695	1695		
Ringwould	Ripple Mill; TR 362 490	Smock		c. 1810	Working until Second World War, stripped of machinery 1957 and converted to transmitter station. Now restored to working order.	Media related to Ripple Mill, Ringwould at Wikimedia Commons
Rochester	Star Hill Mill; The Old Mill; TQ 746 678			1787	Demolished c.1865.	
Rochester	Star Hill Mill; Friday's Mill; TQ 746 678			1843	Burnt down in 1852.	
Rochester	Star Hill Mill; Boy's Mill; Belsey's Mill; TQ 747 679	Smock		1877	Demolished 1890–95.	
Rochester	Delce Mill; TQ 744 674	Smock		1853	Demolished May 1946.	
Rochester	Borstal Hill Mill; TQ 731 666			c.1870	Demolished in 1885.	
Rochester	Church Mill; Horsnaill's Mill; TQ 740 679	Post	1769	1769	Demolished c.1880.	
Rochester	Horsnaill's Mill	Smock				
Rochester	Zenith Mill; Huggin's Mill; Approximately TQ 740 679	Post	1769	1769	Burnt down 1820s or 1830s.	
Rochester	St Margaret's Mills; Approximately TQ 740 679	Two post mills	1769	1769	One was standing in 1798.	
Rodmersham Green	Rodmersham Green Mill; TQ 916 614	Tower		1835	Working until 1917. Demolished in 1969.	
Rolvenden	Rolvenden Mill; TQ 838 315	Post	1596; 1610; 1769	c. 1580	Working until c.1885. Restored in 1957.	Media related to Rolvenden Windmill at Wikimedia Commons
Ruckinge	Ruckinge Mill; Approximately TR 029 335	Post		1830s	Stood 2 furlongs (400 m) east of Ruckinge Church. Moved from Hythe. Demolished c.1912 leaving the roundhouse, which was demolished c.1924.	

=== S ===
Location	Name of mill and grid reference	Type	Maps	First mention or built	Notes	Image
Sandgate	Saw mill	Smock			A saw mill. Moved to Bethersden (Little Mill).	
Sandhurst		Post	1769	1769	Stood 1 mile 1 furlong (1.8 km) north east of Sandhurst Church. Moved to Boxhurst Farm by 1793.	
Sandhurst	Boxhurst Farm Mill	Post		1793	Stood 1 mile 2 furlongs (2.0 km) east north east of Sandhurst Church. Blown down c.1842.	
Sandhurst	Ringle Crouch Green Mill; TQ 804 284	Smock		1844	Working until 1912. Demolished in 1945, leaving the base standing. Modern electricity-generating residential mock mill built on base in 1997.	Media related to Ringle Crouch Green Mill, Sandhurst at Wikimedia Commons
Sandwich	St Mary's Mill	Post	1695; 1736	1608	Stood north west of the town.	
Sandwich	Canterbury Gate Mill	Post	1736; 1769	1736	Stood north west of the town. Working in 1842.	
Sandwich	Black Mill	Smock		1870s	Stood north west of the town. Burnt down c. 1910.	
Sandwich	White Mill; TR 322 586	Smock		1760	Worked by wind until 1926, then by engine until 1957. Restored in 1960s.	Media related to White Mill, Sandwich at Wikimedia Commons
Sandwich	Millwall Mill; Town Mill	Smock		1878	Stood near St Clement's Church, Sandwich. Standing in 1878, burnt down unknown date.	
Sandwich	Millwall	Post			Gone by c. 1850.	
Sandwich	Millwall (3rd mill)	Post				
Sandwich	Sandown Gate Mills	Post x3				
Sandwich	St Bart's Mill	Post				
Sarre	Sarre Windmill; TR 259 651	Smock		1820	Working by wind until 1920, then by gas engine for a few years later. Restored 1986-91.	Media related to Sarre Windmill at Wikimedia Commons
Selling	Shottenden Mill; Perry Wood Mill	Post	1596; 1736; 1769	1596	Stood 7 furlongs (1.4 km) south of Selling Church. Working until 1910, Demolished c.1920.	
Sellindge	Stone Hill Mill	Smock		1843	Stood 3 furlongs (600 m) north of Sellindge Church. Working in 1884. Demolished c.1898.	
Sevenoaks	Near "The Vine"	Post			Said to have been moved to West Kingsdown, there by 1804. Modern research places extreme doubt on the move and considerable doubt on the very existence of this mill.	
Sevenoaks	Knott's Mill; Tubs Hill Mill			1792	Stood 4 furlongs (800 m) north west of Sevenoaks Church. Demolished during the winter of 1870-71.	
Sevenoaks	Hubbards Hill Mill			1669	Stood on Sevenoaks Common.	
Sevenoaks	Hubbard Hill Mill	Smock		1747	Stood on Sevenoaks Common. Moved to Sevenoaks Weald in 1856.	
Sevenoaks	Melregge (Witley Woods)			1388	Stood 1 mile 2 furlongs (2.0 km) south west of Sevenoaks Church.	
Sevenoaks	Bradbourne Mill	Post		1904	Blown down 1912. Modern research finds absolutely no evidence that this mill ever existed. Believed to be a Piltdown Man hoax.	
Sevenoaks Weald		Smock	1862	1856	Stood 4 furlongs (800 m) south west of Weald Church. Moved from Sevenoaks (Hubbards Hill). Working in 1880, demolished in 1890s.	
Sheerness	Great Mill; Ride's Mill; TQ 921 746	Smock	1829	1816	Working by wind until 1905, then by steam engine until 1918. Demolished in 1924, leaving the base standing. Residential mock mill built on base in 2006-08.	Media related to Great Mill, Sheerness at Wikimedia Commons
Sheerness	Mile Town, Little Mill	Smock		1843	Stood 1 mile (1.6 km) south east of Sheerness Church. Burnt down 7 February 1862.	
Sheerness	Hundred Acre Mill; Marine Town Mill; Sea View Mill; TQ 924 750	Tower		1860	Demolished in 1878, leaving a stump, which survives	
Sheldwich			1769	1769	Stood 5 furlongs (1,000 m) west of Sheldwich Church.	
Shepherdswell, or Sibertswold	Shepherdswell Mill	Smock		1857	Stood 3 furlongs (600 m) north of Shepherdswell Church. Standing in 1910, gone by 1933.	
Shorne		Post		1315		
Shorne	Shorne Mill	Post	1596; 1610	1596	Stood 2 furlongs (400 m) north west of Shorne Church. Struck by lightning and consequently demolished.	
Shorne	Shorne Mill; TQ 689 713	Post	1736; 1769	1736	Working until 1870, converted to observatory in 1890s. Burnt down in 1952. Major timbers survived as late as 1986.	
Sissinghurst	Crampton's Mill; TQ 789 376	Smock		1843	Moved from Hartley. Demolished on 27 November 1951.	
Sittingbourne		Smock		1843	Stood 4 furlongs (800 m) west of Sittingbourne Church. Standing in 1880, burnt down at an unknown date.	
Smarden	West Mill; Town mill Corne's Mill; TQ 879 420	Post	1769	1680	Working until at least 1899. Collapsed in 1953. Windmill World	Media related to West Mill, Smarden at Wikimedia Commons
Smarden	East Mill; Black Mill; TQ 884 429	Smock		1804		
Snargate			1610	1610	Stood south of Snargate Church.	
Snodland		Smock		c.1839	Moved to Gillingham (Stedman's) c.1839.	
Southborough	Southborough Common; TQ 575 424				Stood 2 furlongs (400 m) south west of Southborough Church.	
Southfleet	Betsham Mill	Post	1829	1829	Stood 3 furlongs (600 m) north west of Southfleet Church. Demolished c.1873, leaving the base standing. Base had been demolished by 1933.	
Southfleet	Troy's Island				Stood 7 furlongs (1.4 km) west of Southfleet Church.	
Stanford	Stanford Mill; TR 128 378	Tower		1857	Working by wind until 1946, then by engine until 1961. Under restoration.	
Stansted	Stansted Mill		1736; 1769	1736	Stood 2 furlongs (400 m) south south east of Stansted Church.	
Staple	Barnsole Mill			1870s	Stood 3 furlongs (600 m) east south east of Staple Church. Burnt down c.1914.	
Staplehurst			1769	1769	Stood 1 furlong (200 m) west of Staplehurst Church.	
Staplehurst	Staplehurst Mill; TQ 787 430	Smock		1805	Working until 1880s. Burnt down 22 June 1911, leaving the base.	
Stelling Minnis	Brambleton		1736	1736	Stood 1 mile (1.6 km) south of Stelling Minnis Church.	
Stelling Minnis	Brambleton		1736; 1769	1736	Stood 1 mile (1.6 km) south of Stelling Minnis Church.	
Stelling Minnis	Brambleton Mill	Post		c. 1850	Stood 1 mile (1.6 km) south of Stelling Minnis Church. Standing in 1881.	
Stelling Minnis	TR 146 466	Post	1736; 1769	1736	Demolished in 1866.	
Stelling Minnis	Davison's Mill; TR 146 466	Smock		1866	Working until 1970, restored.	Media related to Davison's Mill, Stelling Minnis at Wikimedia Commons
St Margaret's at Cliffe	Mill Close Mill	Post	1596; 1695; 1736	1596	Stood to the north west of St Margaret's at Cliffe church.	
St Margarets Bay	St Margaret's Bay Mill; TR 363 436	Smock		1929	Built to generate electricity.	
St Nicholas at Wade			1719	1719	Stood about 6 furlongs (1.2 km) west of St Nicholas at Wade Church. Standing in 1719, demolished by 1791.	
Stockbury		1736; 1769	1769		Stood 2 furlongs (400 m) south west of Stockbury Church.	
Stodmarsh	Wickhambreux Mill; TR 233 604	Hollow Post		Mid-19th century		
Strood	Strood Hill Mill; TQ 733 693	Smock		1843	Demolished c.1860.	
Strood	Field's Mill; TQ 730 700			1843	Burnt down c.1875.	
Strood	Killick's Mill; TQ 730 700	Smock		1843	Standing in 1891, gone by 1933.	
Sutton Valence	Town Mill; TQ 815 493	Smock		c. 1720	Demolished in 1945, leaving the base, which is now house converted.	
Sutton Valence	Five Wents Mill				Stood 7 furlongs (1.4 km) north east of Sutton Valence Church. Demolished by 1875.	
Swingfield	Old Mill	Post			Stood 1 mile (1.6 km) west of Swingfield Church.	
Swingfield	Old Mill	Smock		1872	Stood 1 mile (1.6 km) west of Swingfield Church. Blown down in 1884.	
Swingfield	New Mill	Smock		1885	Stood 1 mile (1.6 km) west of Swingfield Church. Burnt down in August 1911.	
Swingfield	Selstead Mill	Smock		1880	Stood 1 mile (1.6 km) north west of Swingfield Church. Struck by lightning and burnt down, spring 1885.	

=== T ===
Location	Name of mill and grid reference	Type	Maps	First mention or built	Notes	Image
Tenterden	Shoreham Lane	Post		1599	Stood 1 mile 3 furlongs (2.2 km) north of Tenterden Church. Standing in 1686.	
Tenterden	NW of church				Stood 5 chains (100 m) north west of Tenterden Church. Marked on an Ordnance Survey map published between 1858 and 1872.	
Tenterden	Mill Farm		1736; 1769	1736	Stood 5 furlongs (1.0 km) north east of Tenterden Church. Standing in 1819, gone by 1851.	
Tenterden	Goods Hill Mill	Post		c. 1807	Stood 1 mile 4 furlongs (2.4 km) north west of Tenterden Church. Working until 1890. Demolished in 1896.	
Tenterden	Ashbourne Mill	Post		1807	Stood 1 mile 1 furlong (1.8 km) west south west of Tenterden Church. Working until 1910. Demolished in December 1912.	
Tenterden	Leigh Green Mill	Smock		1818	Stood 1 mile 2 furlongs (2.0 km) east south east of Tenterden Church. Burnt down on 26 November 1913.	
Teynham	Conyer Quay	Smock		1850s	Stood 6 furlongs (1.2 km) north of Teynham Church. Standing in 1850s.	
Throwley	Parsonage Mill	Smock	1736	1736	Stood 7 furlongs (1.4 km) north east of Throwley Church. Working in 1884.	
Throwley	Clare's Forstal Mill	Smock		1872	Stood 7 furlongs (1.4 km) south south west of Throwley Church. Demolished in 1915.	
Tonbridge	Uridge's Mill	Post		1843	Stood 4 furlongs (800 m) north of Tonbridge Castle. Standing in 1868. Demolished c.1872.	
Tonge	Tonge Mill			1815	Stood 4 furlongs (800 m) south south west of Tonge Church. Standing in 1834.	
Tunbridge Wells	Calverley Mill	Smock	1769	1769	Stood near St Peter's Church, Tunbridge Wells. Demolished c.1860, Machinery used in a windmill at Crowborough.	
Tunbridge Wells	Culverden Mill	Post		1832	Stood 30 chains (600 m) west of St John's Church, Tunbridge Wells. Demolished c.1870.	

=== U ===
Location	Name of mill and grid reference	Type	Maps	First mention or built	Notes	Image
Ulcombe	Ulcombe Hill Mill			1769	Stood 2 furlongs (400 m) south south east of Ulcombe Church. Demolished c.1850s.	
Ulcombe	Windmill Hill Mill	Smock		1878	Stood 5 furlongs (1.0 km) east south east of Ulcombe Church. Working until 1892. Demolished on 16 July 1911.	
Upchurch	Wakeley's Mill; TQ 8324 6717	Smock		1843	Burnt down in September 1910'	
Uphill	Uphill Mill; Hawkinge Mill	Smock		1790	Stood 6 furlongs (1.2 km) west north west of Uphill Church. Working until 1914. Demolished in May 1931.	

=== W ===
Location	Name of mill and grid reference	Type	Maps	First mention or built	Notes	Image
Walmer		Post	1736	1736	Stood south west of Walmer Church.	
Waltham	Cloke's Mill; TR 109 488	Smock		1872	Working until early 1900s. Blown down on 11 February 1931, leaving the base.	
Waltham	Dilnot's Old Mill; TR 110 490	Smock		c.1850	Working until c.1908. Collapsed on 20 May 1910.	
Warehorne			1596	1596	Stood east of Warehorne Church.	
Warehorne		Post	1769	1769	Stood 3 furlongs (600 m) north west of Warehorne Church. Demolished c.1900.	
Westerham	Newland Mill	Horizontal windmill		1792	Standing in 1809.	
Westerham	Windmill Bank	Post	1596; 1610	1596	Standing in 1666, marked on maps to mid-C17th.	
Westerham	Hosey Common Mill; Hosey Hill Mill			1830	Stood 1 mile (1.6 km) south south east of Westerham Church. Burnt down, mid-1870s.	
Westerham	Farley Mill	Post		1761	Marked on a map dated 1825.	
Westhalimot; Isle of Thanet			c.1200			
West Hougham	West Hougham Mill; TR 268 402	Smock		1802	Collapsed 1951; Windmill World	
West Kingsdown	Old Mill	Post		1843	Burnt Down May 1909	
West Kingsdown	West Kingsdown Mill; TQ 582 623	Smock		1880	Windmill World	Media related to West Kingsdown Windmill at Wikimedia Commons
Westwell	Tutt Hill Mill			1878	Stood 1 mile 2 furlongs (2.0 km) south west of Westwell Church. Burnt down in 1880.	
Whitfield	Whitfield Mill	Smock		1805	Stood 4 furlongs (800 m) west of Whitfield Church. Demolished c.1916.	
Whitstable	Borstal Hill; TR 105 652		1736	1736		
Whitstable	Black Mill; TR 105 652	Smock		1815	Working until c.1905. Subsequently converted to a motel, now a house.	Media related to Black Mill, Whitstable at Wikimedia Commons
Whitstable	Borstal Hill pumping mill				Stood 1 mile (1.6 km) south west of Whitstable Church. A pumping windmill.	
Whitstable	Feakins' Mill	Smock		1843	Stood 1 mile (1.6 km) south west of Whitstable Church. Working by wind until 1891. Demolished in 1905. Windmill World	
Whitstable	Feakins' Mill	Post			Stood behind Whitstable railway station.	
Willesborough	Old Mill; TR 032 422	Smock		1843	Demolished in 1868.	
Willesborough	New Mill; TR 032 422	Smock		1869	Worked by wind until 1938. Restored 1991.	Media related to New Mill, Willesbrough at Wikimedia Commons
Wingham	Wingham Well; TR 236 568	Tower		1878	Demolished in December 1963, leaving a stump.	
Wingham	Shatterling Mill	Post	1769	1769	Stood 6 furlongs (1.2 km) north east of Wingham Church.	
Wittersham	Old Mill	Post	1736; 1769	1736	Stood 3 furlongs (600 m) north east of Wittersham Church. Demolished in 1922.	Media related to Old Mill, Wittersham at Wikimedia Commons
Wittersham	Stocks Mill; TQ 913 273	Post		1781	Working until c.1900, then preserved by private individuals. Restored 2002-04.	Media related to Stocks Mill, Wittersham at Wikimedia Commons
Woodchurch	Place Lane	Smock			Moved within Woodchurch (Upper Mill), 1850s.	
Woodchurch	Upper Mill	Smock	1769	1769	Stood 2 furlongs (400 m) north north east of Woodchurch Church, Working until 1910. Demolished in 1940.	Media related to Woodchurch Windmills at Wikimedia Commons
Woodchurch	Susan's Hill Farm	Smock			Moved within Woodchurch (Lower Mill), 1850s.	
Woodchurch	Lower Mill; TQ 943 353	Smock		1820	Moved from Susans Hill Farm. Working until 1926. Restored in 1980s.	Media related to Woodchurch Windmills at Wikimedia Commons
Woodnesborough			1695; 1736	1695	Stood south of Woodnesborough Church.	
Woodnesborough		Post	1736; 1769	1735	Stood west south west of Woodnesborough Church. Moved to Ash (Mount Ephraim Mill) in 1818.	
Wormshill	Beddington (north)				Stood 4 furlongs (800 m) north west of Wormshill Church.	
Wormshill	Beddington (south)				Stood 4 furlongs (800 m) north west of Wormshill Church.	
Worth		Smock	1769	1769	Stood 4 furlongs (800 m) west south west of worth Church. Demolished c.1903.	
Wrotham	Fry's Mill; TQ 6283 5776	Smock		1800	Burnt down in 1906.	
Wye	Wye Windmill	Smock		1843	Stood 2 furlongs (400 m) west south west of Wye Church. Demolished c.1920. Base standing in 1933, demolished in 1960s.	

=== Y ===
Location	Name of mill and grid reference	Type	Maps	First mention or built	Notes	Image
Yalding	Rugmore (Rugmer) Hill Mill	Smock		1809	Stood 1 mile 4 furlongs (2.4 km) south east of Yalding Church. Standing in 1870s.	
Yalding	Downs Farm Mill	Post		1844	Stood 4 furlongs (800 m) north east of Yalding Church. Demolished c.1870.	
Yalding	Claygate Mill			Standing in 1847	1847	

== Locations formerly within Kent ==
- For windmills in Bexley, Blackheath, Bromley, Chelsfield, Chislehurst, Deptford, Downe, Eltham, Erith, Greenwich, Keston, Lee, Plumstead Common, Sydenham and Woolwich see List of windmills in Greater London. For the windmill closely associated with Bexley Heath, see the entry under Crayford (above).

== Maps ==
The maps quoted by date are:

- 1414 – Thomas of Elmham (map of Thanet)
- 1596 – Phil Symondson
- 1610 – John Speed
- 1695 – Robert Morden
- 1719 – Dr Harris
- 1736 – Emanuel Bowen
- 1769 – Andrews, Dury and Herbert
- 1829 – Greenwood & Co

== See also ==
- Mills in Canterbury

== Notes ==
Mills in bold are still standing, known building dates are indicated in bold.

1. Coles Finch states that the mill moved from Playden to Appledore had originally stood at Playden, been moved to Appledore and then moved to Rye, East Sussex (Playden is very close to Rye) before being moved back to Appledore for a second time. Which of the sites it occupied in Appledore after the first move is not recorded.
