= Upper Mill, Eastry =

Windmill in Eastry, Kent, England

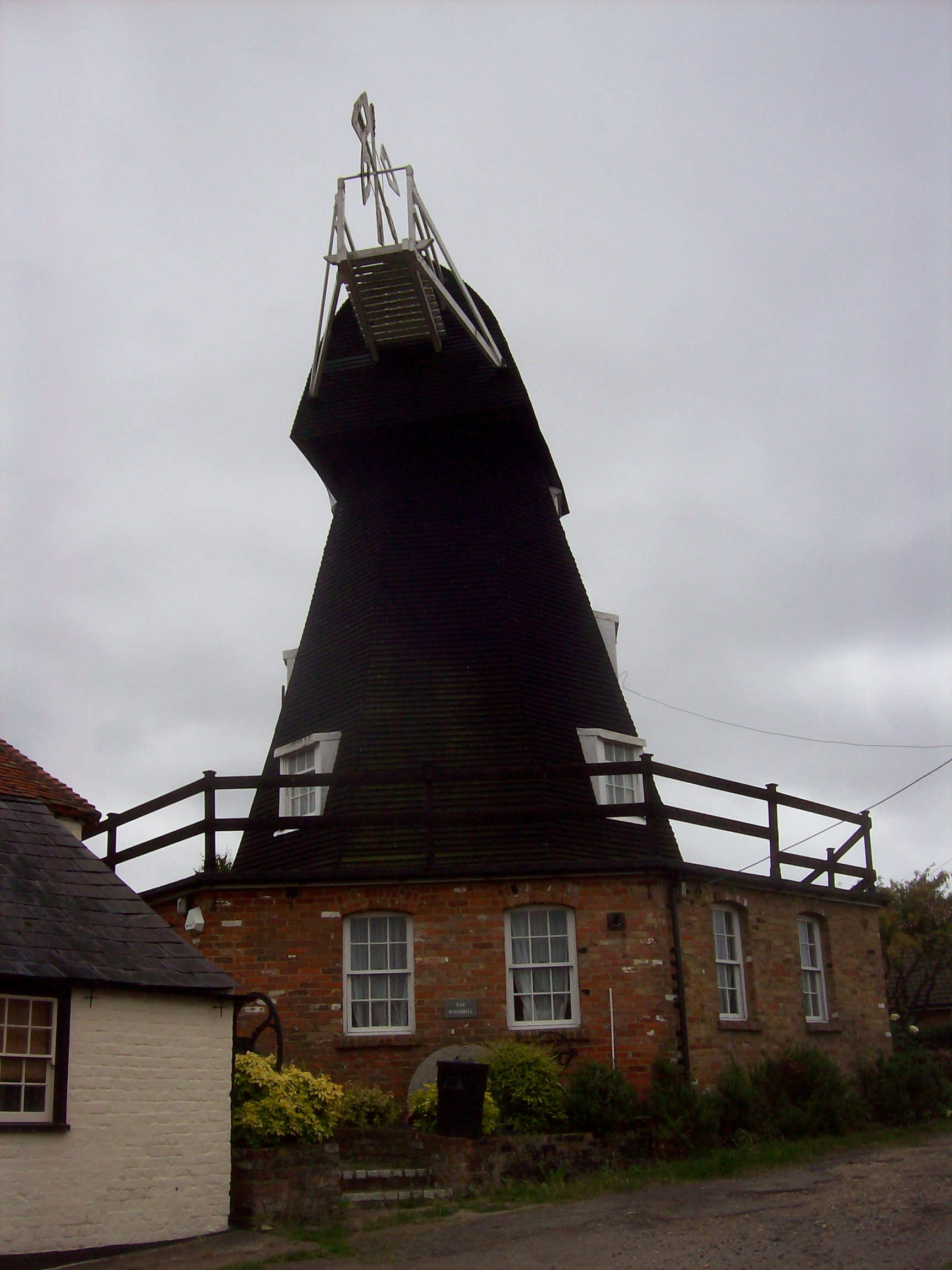
- The converted mill
- Interactive map of Upper Mill, Eastry

Origin
- Grid reference: TR 304 545
- Coordinates: 51.2432°N 1.2992°E
- Year built: 1740s

Information
- Purpose: Corn mill
- Type: Smock mill
- Storeys: Three-storey smock
- Base storeys: Single-storey base
- Smock sides: Eight-sided
- No. of sails: Four
- Type of sails: Patent sails
- Windshaft: Cast iron
- Winding: Fantail
- Fantail blades: Six blades
- Auxiliary power: Gas engine 1913-1949; Electric motor 1949 - 1959
- No. of pairs of millstones: Four pairs

Upper Mill is a Grade II listed house converted smock mill in Eastry, Kent, England. It was built in the mid eighteenth century.

== History ==
Upper Mill was built in the mid eighteenth century. A mill was marked on Symonson's map of 1596, Robert Morden's map of 1695 and Emanuel Bowen's map of 1736. Two mills were marked on Andrews, Drury and Herbert's map of 1769. Four mills were marked on the 1819-43 Ordnance Survey map.

Of the four mills the fate of one is unknown. One was burnt down and the third, the Lower Mill, which was similar in appearance to the surviving mill except that it lacked a brick base, was demolished in 1926. Lower Mill bore the date 1743 inside.

The earliest confirmed date for Upper Mill is a sale document of 1770, although the mill is believed to be older. The mill was worked by wind until 1913, when the sails and fantail were removed. It was worked by a suction gas engine until 1949 and then by electric motor until 1959, when the business was transferred to Sandwich.

== Description ==
Upper Mill is a three-storey black smock mill on a single-storey brick base. It had four Patent sails carried on a cast-iron windshaft. The mill was winded by a fantail. The mill drove four pairs of millstones. The mill was stripped of machinery after milling ceased, with only the windshaft and wooden brake wheel remaining.

== Millers ==
- Thomas Clark 1826 - 1845
- W Clark 1913
- Harold H Clark - 1949
- Arthur Clark 1949 - 1959

References for above:-
