= Stanford Windmill =

Windmill in Stanford, Kent, England

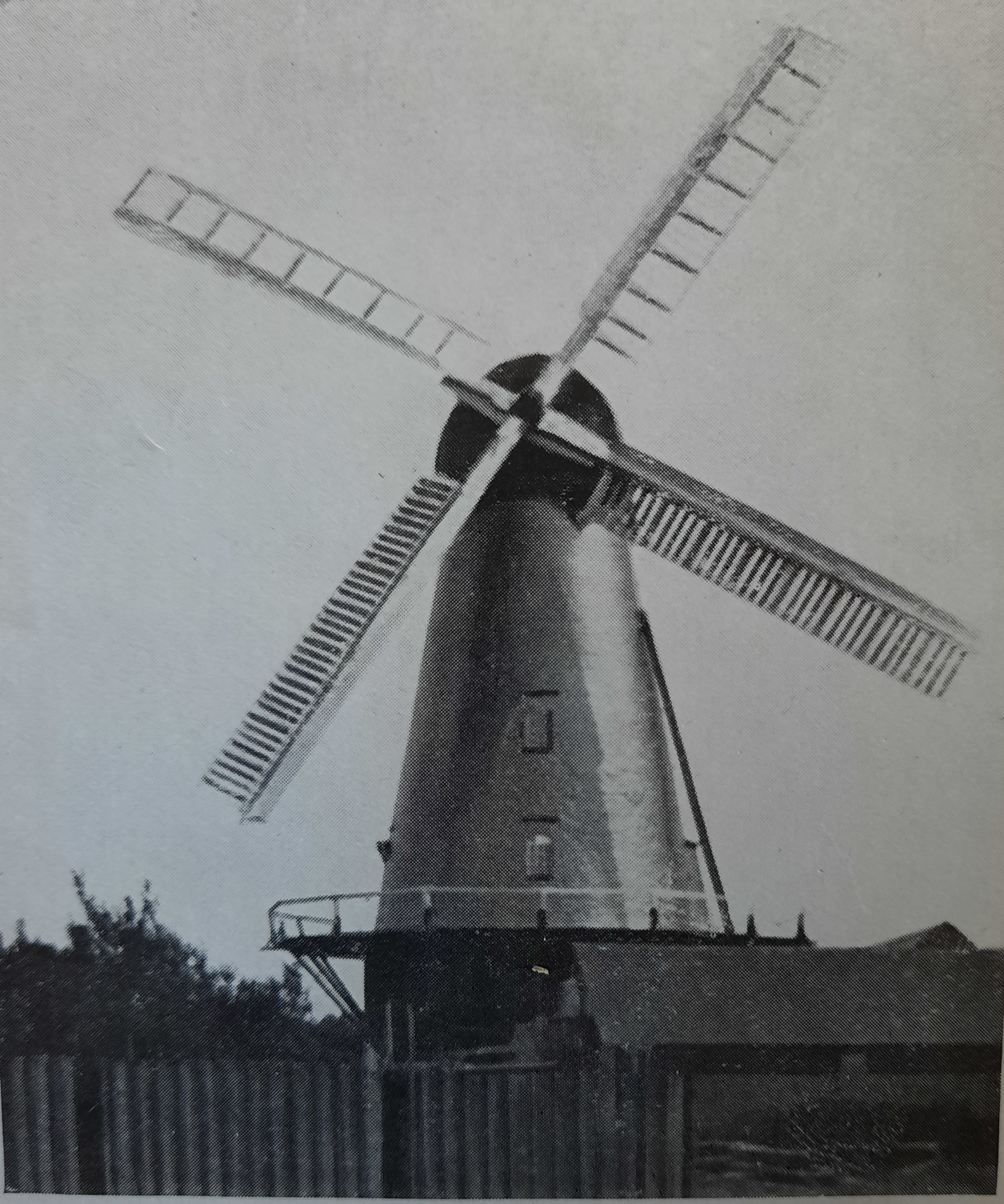
- Interactive map of Stanford Windmill

Origin
- Mill location: TR 128 378
- Coordinates: 51°6′1″N 1°2′17″E
- Year built: 1857

Information
- Purpose: Corn mill
- Type: Tower mill
- Storeys: Five storeys
- No. of sails: Four
- Type of sails: Patent sails
- Windshaft: Cast iron
- Winding: Fantail
- Fantail blades: Eight blades
- Auxiliary power: Paraffin engine Oil engine 1936 - Electric motor - 1969
- No. of pairs of millstones: Four pairs

Stanford Windmill is a Grade II listed tower mill in Stanford, Kent, England that was built in 1857. It stands on Kennett Lane in Stanford.

== History ==
Stanford mill was built in 1857 by the Ashford millwright John Hill. The tower of the mill was cracked when a bomb was dropped nearby during World War I. A single cylinder paraffin engine was fitted between the wars. This was replaced by a Ruston & Hornsby engine in 1936. The mill had a new pair of sails in 1925, 1930 and 1936. It worked by wind until 1946, in which year the shutters were removed from the sails. The sails and cap roof were removed in 1961, and a corrugated asbestos roof built on the cap frame. Milling continued by engine until 1969, with the paraffin engine being replaced by an electric motor. Some of the milling furniture was used in the restoration of Draper's Mill, Margate in the 1970s.

== Description ==
Stanford mill is a five-storey tower mill which formerly had a Kentish-type cap. It had four patent sails carried on a cast-iron windshaft. The mill was winded by a fantail and there was a stage at first-floor level. The mill drove four pairs of millstones, two steel mills and two roller mills. The brake wheel is a composite one, with iron arms and a wooden rim. This drives a cast-iron wallower. The great spur wheel is also of cast iron. The mill drives to the millstones is overdrift.

== Millers ==
- J Fox 1862
- Thomas Rolfe 1878
- Henry Taylor 1913–1929
- G R Holt 1929–1946
- H Beresford Lye 1946–1959
- M Hancock & Son 1959–1969

References for above:-
