= Reed Mill, Kingston =

Tower mill in Kent, England

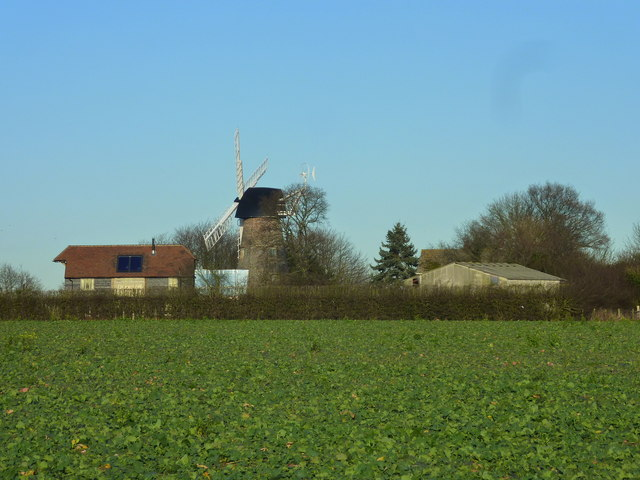
- Reed Mill, January 2012
- Interactive map of Reed Mill, Kingston

Origin
- Grid reference: TR 174 499
- Coordinates: 51°12′25″N 1°06′38″E
- Year built: Early nineteenth century

Information
- Purpose: Corn mill
- Type: Tower mill
- Storeys: Four storeys
- No. of sails: Four
- Type of sails: Patent sails
- Winding: Fantail
- No. of pairs of millstones: Three pairs

Reed Mill is a tower mill in Kingston, Kent, England that was built in the early nineteenth century and worked until 1915, after which the mill was derelict. In 2010–11 the mill was converted and extended to form residential accommodation.

== History ==
Reed mill was built in the early nineteenth century. It was marked on the 1858–72 Ordnance Survey map. The mill was working until 28 March 1915 when it was tailwinded and the cap and sails were blown off. The fantail was inoperative at the time as a new gear was being cast for it. As it would have cost in excess of £300 to repair the mill was abandoned. Before conversion, the mill was an empty tower, all machinery having been removed. In 2010-11 the mill was converted and extended to form residential accommodation by RJ Gibbs and Sons LTD. A new-build barn and glass conservatory were built adjoining the mill. The conversion was covered in the first programme of the second series of Channel 4's The Restoration Man programme.

== Description ==
Reed Mill is a four-storey tower mill, formerly with a Kentish-style cap carrying four patent sails. It was winded by a fantail. There was no stage. The mill drove three pairs of millstones.

== Millers ==
- Daniel Gouger 1825 - circa 1865
- F J Fagg - 1915

References for above:-

== See also ==
- http://archiver.rootsweb.ancestry.com/th/read/Isle-of-Thanet/2005-09/1126447767
