= Great Mill, Sheerness =

Windmill in Sheerness, Kent, England

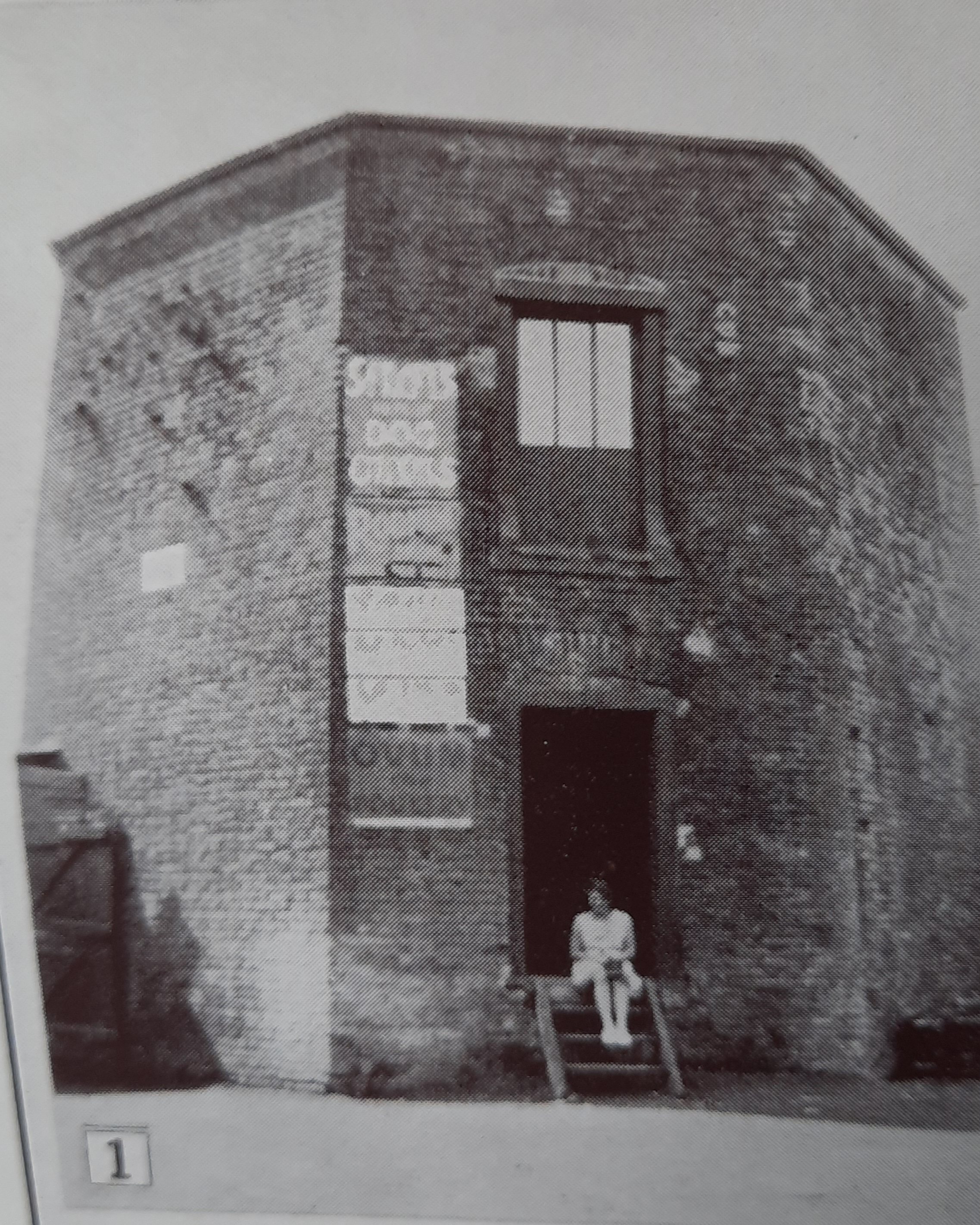
- The base between 1924 and 1933
- Interactive map of Great Mill, Sheerness

Origin
- Mill name: Great Mill; Ride's Mill
- Grid reference: TQ 921 746
- Coordinates: 51°26′19.3″N 0°45′45.4″E
- Year built: 1816

Information
- Purpose: Corn mill
- Type: Smock mill
- Storeys: Four-storey smock
- Base storeys: Two-storey base
- No. of sails: Four
- Type of sails: Patent sails
- Winding: Hand winded
- Auxiliary power: Steam engine (1889–1918)
- No. of pairs of millstones: Three pairs
- Year lost: 1924
- Other information: A new smock has been built on the surviving base to serve as residential accommodation.

Great Mill or Ride's Mill is a Grade II listed smock mill just off the High Street in Sheerness, Kent, England, that was demolished in 1924, leaving the brick base standing. It now has a new smock tower built on it as residential accommodation.

== History ==
Work on building the Great mill was started by the millwright Humphrey of Cranbrook in 1813. Owing to the nature of the ground the mill was built on it was necessary to lay deep foundations. Lack of funds meant that the mill was left as an unfinished base for a couple of years before Thomas Webb, who owned the Little Mill, bought the unfinished mill and financed its completion in 1816. A steam engine was added in 1889 as auxiliary power. The mill was worked by wind until 1905, when the sails and stage were removed. It worked by steam engine until 1918, and was demolished in 1924. The mill's brick base was left, serving as a corn store in the 1930s.

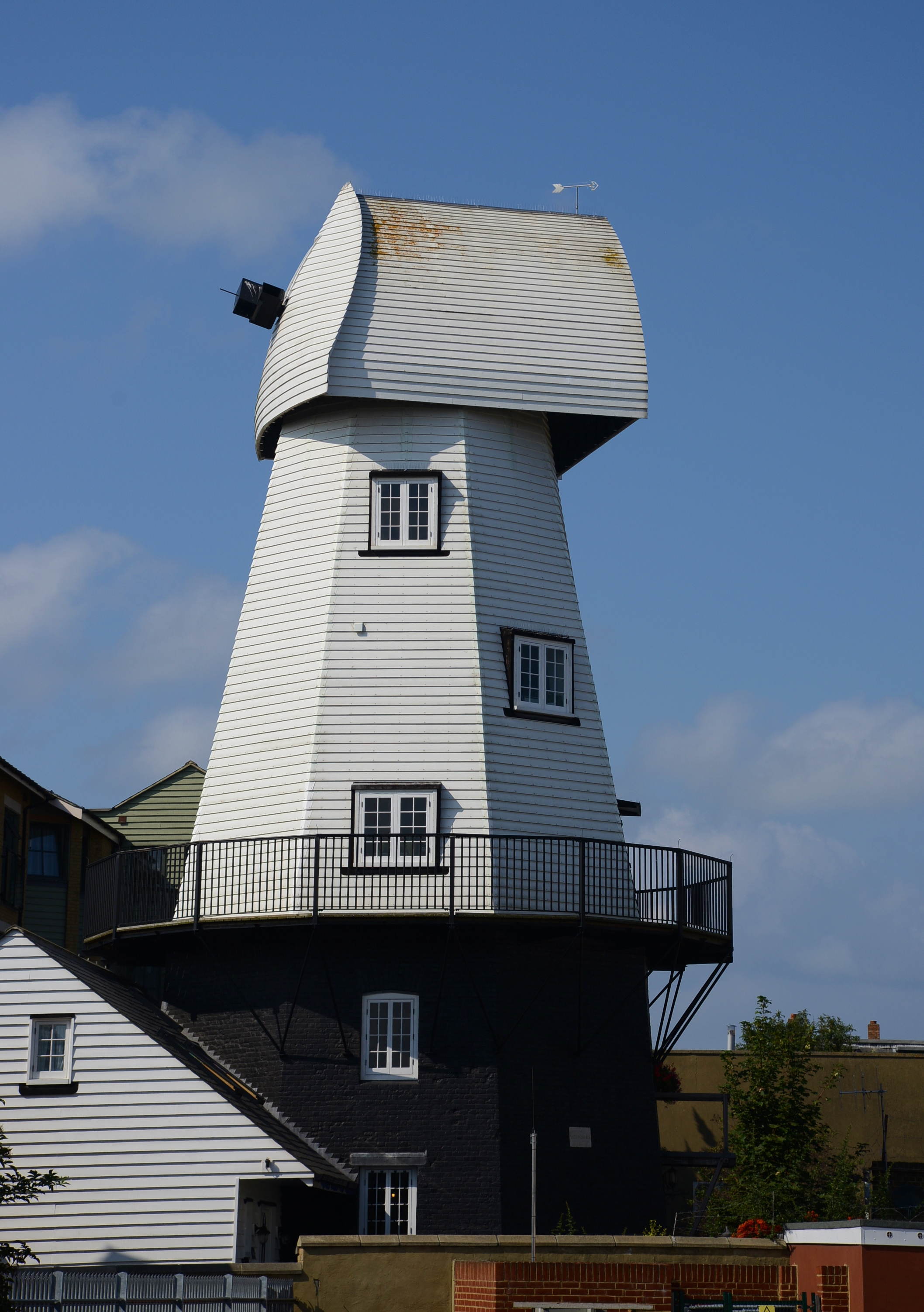
The replica mill, March 2014

In 2006, planning permission was applied for, and granted, to convert the existing mill base into a flat, with a new smock tower built on the base containing another flat, and an extension containing a third flat. Construction started late in 2006. The replica windmill will have a stage and dummy sails. The cap was lifted onto the mill tower late in 2007. On 23 January 2008 a fire started in the mill tower. The fire was later declared not to have been a case of arson.

== Description ==
Great Mill was a four-storey smock mill on a two-storey brick base, with a Kentish-style cap carrying four patent sails. It was winded by hand, no fantail being fitted. There was a stage at second-floor level. The mill drove three pairs of millstones, and the steam engine drove a further two pairs, as well as the millstones in the windmill. The mill was 66 feet (20.12 m) high, and the brickwork in the base is 22 inches (560 mm) thick. The replica has a smock built on a steel frame, with a Kentish-style cap.

== Millers ==
- Thomas Webb 1816 – 1864
- G Ride & Son 1864 – 1918

References for above:-
