= New Mill, Northbourne =

Windmill in Northbourne, Kent, England

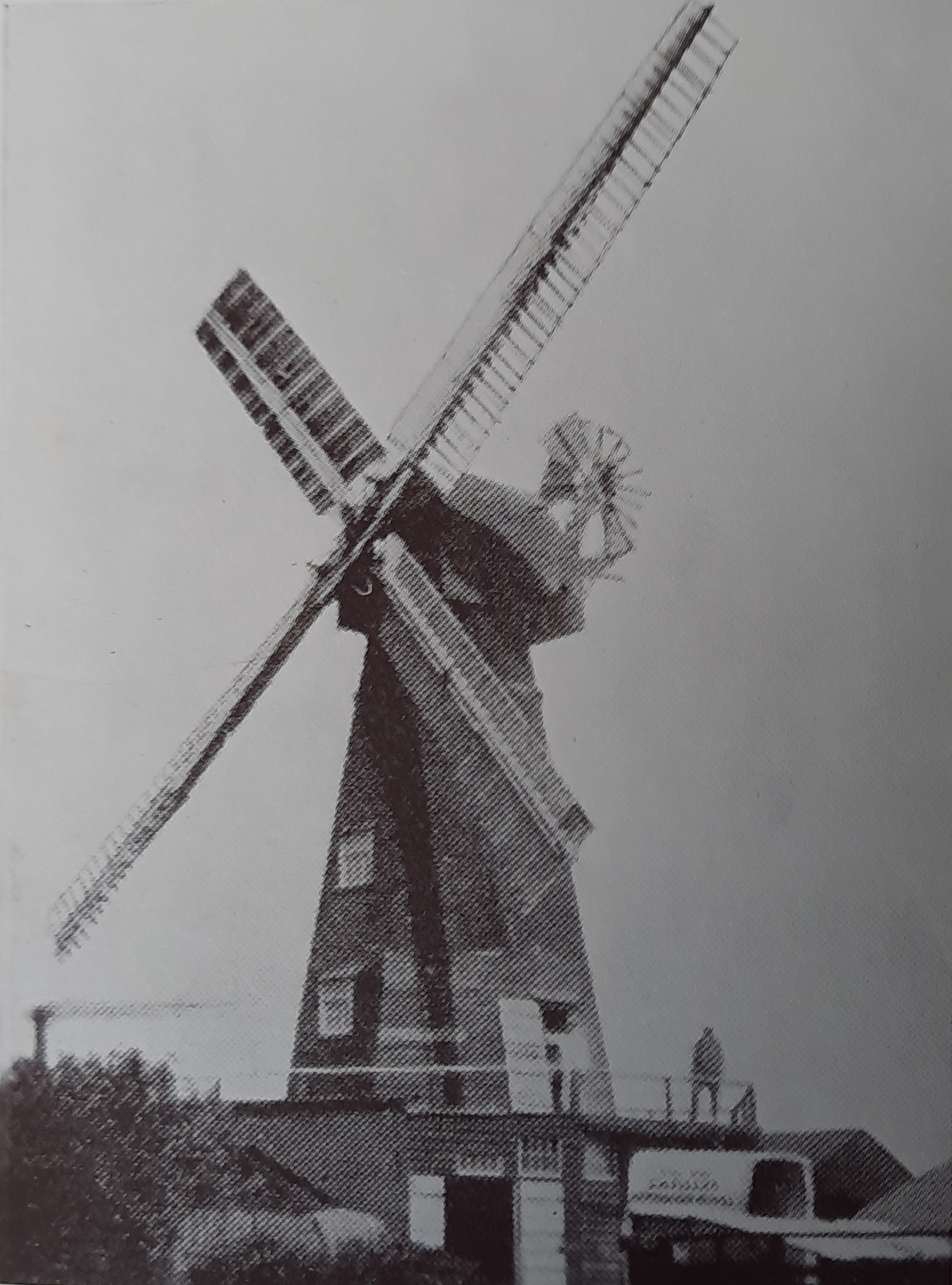
- Interactive map of New Mill, Northbourne

Origin
- Grid reference: TR 331 521
- Coordinates: 51°13′11.5″N 1°20′10″E
- Year built: 1848

Information
- Purpose: Corn mill
- Type: Smock mill
- Storeys: Four-storey smock
- Base storeys: Single-storey base
- Smock sides: Eight-sided
- No. of sails: Four
- Type of sails: Double Patent sails
- Windshaft: Cast iron
- Winding: Fantail
- Fantail blades: Six blades
- Auxiliary power: Steam engine 1886 - 1947; Electric motor 1951 - 1957
- No. of pairs of millstones: Three pairs

New Mill is a Grade II listed smock mill in Northbourne, Kent, England that was built in 1848 and which has been converted to residential accommodation.

== History ==
New mill was built in 1848 by Messrs J J and T R Holman, the Canterbury millwrights at a cost of £600. It was originally built with two pairs of millstones, and some of the machinery was to be second hand. A 7 horsepower (5.2 kW) Robey & Co. steam engine was added in 1886 at a cost of £210. and a third pair of millstones added in 1892. The mill was overhauled by Holman's in 1910, including two new cant (corner) posts and a new sail. In July 1915 two sails and the fantail were blown off. The mill was repaired in 1916 and from then on ran with only two sails. The steam engine was scrapped in 1947 but the mill was working by wind until 1949, when it was dismantled. After standing idle for a short time it was run by electric motor from 1951 to 1957. The mill was converted into a house in 1976 and the former engine shed was used as bed and breakfast accommodation until approximately 2013. The mill is now purely residential and has recently (as of 2020) been taken over by new owners.

== Description ==
New Mill is a four-storey smock mill on a single storey single-storey brick base. There is a stage at first-floor level. It had four double Patent sails carried on a cast-iron windshaft. The mill was winded by a fantail. It had three pairs of millstones. Some machinery is still present, including the windshaft, one pair of millstones, the engine driveshafts and gearing for the millstones and the governor and associated tentering gear. The cap frame is still in existence, along with the curb and cap centering rollers.

== Millers ==
- Richard Fuller 1848 - 1881
- Thomas M Fuller 1881 - 1902
- Ernest M Fuller 1902 - 1957
- Richard J Fuller 1930 - 1957

References for above:-
