= St Margaret's Bay Windmill =

Windmill in St Margaret's at Cliffe, Dover, England

- Interactive map of St Margaret's Bay Windmill

Origin
- Mill location: St Margaret's at Cliffe, Kent
- Grid reference: TR 363 436
- Coordinates: 51°8′31.5″N 1°22′35″E
- Year built: 1929

Information
- Purpose: Electricity generation
- Type: Smock mill
- Storeys: Three-storey smock
- Base storeys: Single-storey base
- Smock sides: Eight-sided
- No. of sails: Four
- Type of sails: Double Patent sails
- Windshaft: Cast iron
- Winding: Fantail
- Fantail blades: Six blades
- Other information: Last new build traditional windmill in Kent.

St Margaret's Bay Windmill is a Grade II listed smock mill on South Foreland, the southeasternmost point of England. It was built in 1929 to generate electricity for the attached house, high on the White Cliffs of Dover.

== History ==
The mill was built for Sir William Bearswell by Holman's, the Canterbury millwrights. It was built to generate electricity and started generating in June 1929. The mill ceased to generate electricity in 1939, when the dynamo was removed. During the Second World War, the mill was occupied by a special branch of the WRNS. Repairs were made to the mill in 1969 by millwrights Vincent Pargeter and Philip Lennard. These included a new fantail and repairs to the sails.

== Description ==
St Margaret's Bay Windmill is a three-storey smock mill on a single-storey brick base. It has four patent sails and is winded by a fantail. The mill generated electricity via a dynamo and is now used as residential accommodation, a use it has always had.

== See also ==
- South Foreland lighthouse is a few hundred metres away
