= Charing Windmill =

Windmill in Charing, Kent, England

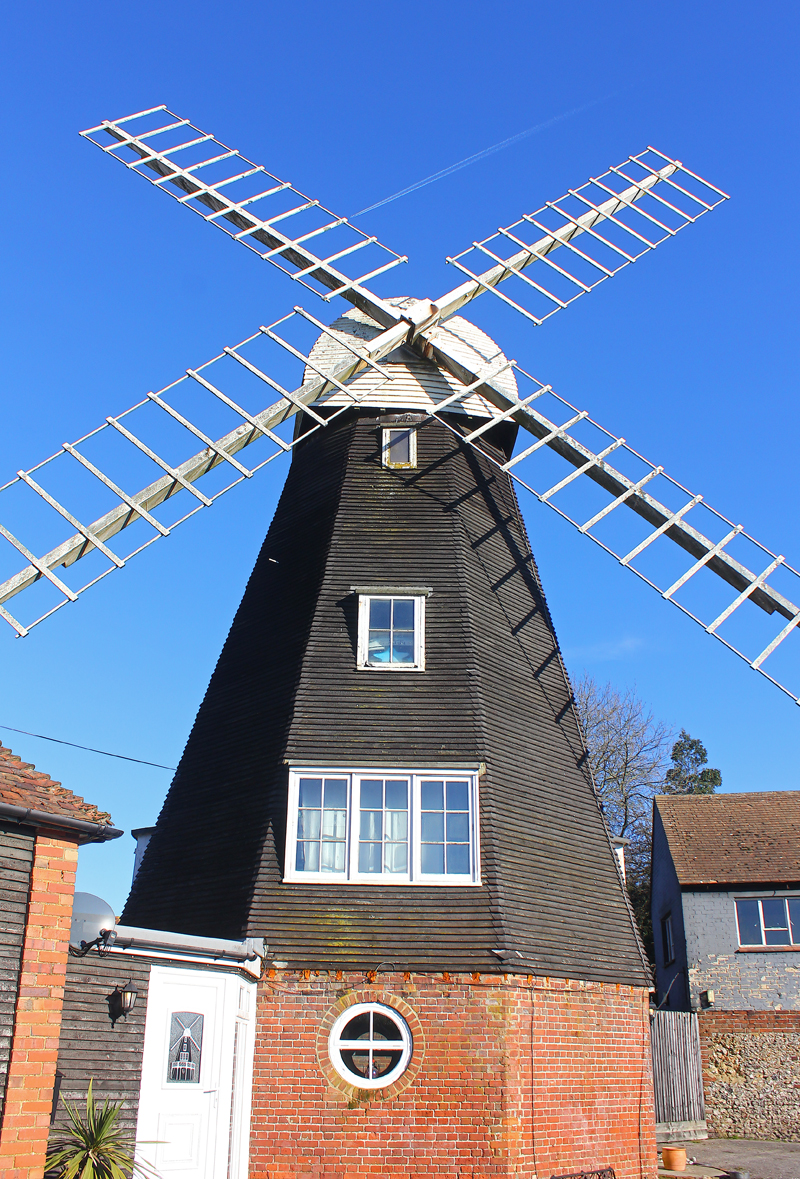
- The converted mill.

Origin
- Mill name: Field Mill
- Grid reference: TQ 957 503
- Coordinates: 51°13′1″N 0°48′8″E
- Year built: Early nineteenth century

Information
- Purpose: Corn milling
- Type: Smock mill
- Storeys: Three-storey smock
- Base storeys: One storey
- Smock sides: Eight-sided
- No. of sails: Four
- Type of sails: Two Common sails and two Spring sails
- Windshaft: Cast iron
- Winding: Fantail
- Fantail blades: Six
- No. of pairs of millstones: Three pairs
- Other information: Was painted white when a working mill, tarred black since conversion to a house.

Charing Windmill is a Grade II listed smock windmill, now converted to a house, on Charing Hill in Kent in southeast England. It is sometimes known as Field Mill, but that name was also used by a watermill in Charing.

== History ==
Charing Mill was built in the early 19th century. It was marked on the 1819–43 Ordnance Survey map and also on Greenwood's 1821 map of Kent. It was working until 1891, when the business was transferred to Field Watermill, although two new common sails had been erected on the mill by Holman's of Canterbury the year before. The sails were removed in 1917 after being damaged in a gale.

== Description ==
Charing Mill is a three-storey smock mill on a single-storey base. It has a Kentish-style cap. It had two common sails and two spring sails and was winded by a fantail. The cast-iron windshaft carries a wooden brake wheel driving a wooden wallower, carried on a wooden upright shaft. The wooden clasp arm great spur wheel survives, but the three pairs of millstones have been removed. The mill was originally painted white overall, but the body of the mill was creosoted in 1969.

== Millers ==
- Thomas Parks 1823–1827
- Richard Chapman Jennings 1839
- A Sidders
- S Andrews
- Robert Millgate 1878 (Charing Heath windmill?)
- Pay 1878–1892 (Field watermill?)
- Pope 1878–1892 (Field watermill?)
- William Smith
- George Smith 1887
- Walter Hicks 1891
