= Copton Pumping Windmill =

Windmill in Faversham, Kent, England

Copton Windmill
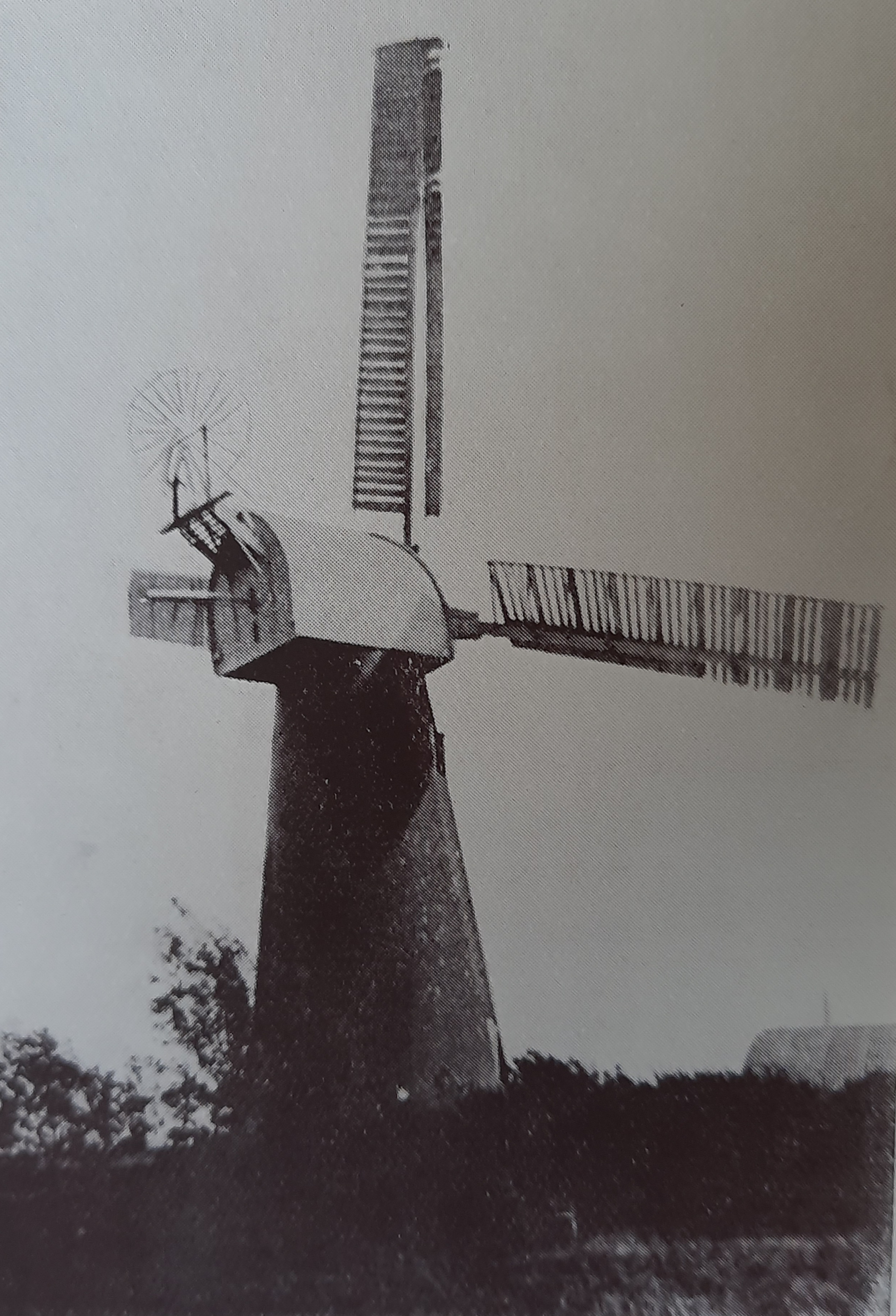
- Interactive map of Copton Windmill

Origin
- Grid reference: TR 014 596
- Coordinates: 51°17′58″N 0°53′10″E
- Operator: Faversham Water Company
- Year built: 1863

Information
- Purpose: Water pumping
- Type: Tower mill
- Storeys: Three storeys
- No. of sails: Four
- Type of sails: Patent sails
- Windshaft: Cast iron
- Winding: Fantail
- Fantail blades: Six blades
- Type of pump: Plunger

Copton Mill is a tower mill in Copton, Faversham, Kent, England that was built in 1863 to pump water for Faversham Water Company's waterworks. It is just south of junction 6 of the M2 motorway.

== History ==
Copton Mill was built by the millwrights Spray and Harmer in 1863. The mill was marked on the 1858–72 and 1903–10 Ordnance Survey maps. It was worked by wind until 1930, when the cap and sails were removed and replaced with a 6,000 imperial gallons (27,000 L) water tank.

== Owners ==
- Faversham Water Company
- Mid Kent Water Company
- South East Water

== Description ==
Copton Mill is a three-storey brick tower mill which formerly had a Kentish-style cap. It had four patent sails 37 feet (11.28 m) long and 5 feet (1.52 m) wide carried on a cast-iron windshaft. The mill was winded by a fantail. It was rated at 15 horsepower (11 kW) and could pump 10,000 imperial gallons (45,000 L) of water per hour. An oil engine was used as auxiliary power.
