= Ringle Crouch Green Mill =

Windmill and smock mill in Sandhurst, Kent, England

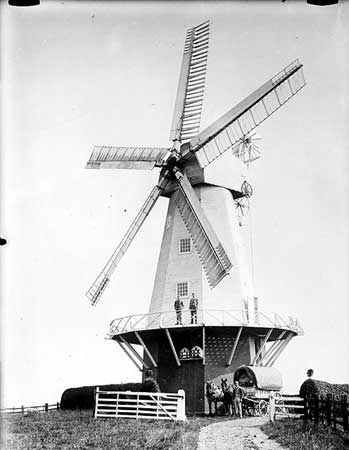
- The mill c.1892

Origin
- Mill location: Sandhurst, Kent
- Grid reference: TQ 805 283
- Coordinates: 51°1′36″N 0°34′17″E
- Year built: 1844

Information
- Purpose: Corn mill
- Type: Smock mill
- Storeys: Four-storey smock
- Base storeys: Two-storey base
- Smock sides: Eight-sided
- No. of sails: Five
- Type of sails: Patent sails
- Windshaft: Cast iron, with Lincolnshire cross
- Winding: Fantail
- Fantail blades: Eight blades
- No. of pairs of millstones: Four pairs
- Year lost: 1944
- Other information: New smock tower built in 1997, replica mill generates electricity.

Ringle Crouch Green Mill is a smock mill in Sandhurst, Kent, England, that was demolished to base level in 1945, and now has a new smock tower built on it as residential accommodation and an electricity generator.

== History ==
Ringle Crouch Green Mill was built in 1844 by William Warren, the Hawkhurst millwright to replace a post mill which had stood at Boxhurst Farm that was blown down in 1842. It was the only corn mill built in Kent with five sails. The mill was built for James Collins, who ran the mill until his death. His son Edward then took the mill and ran it until his death in 1911. The mill was run for a short time by Edward Collins' sons Edward and Harry, then by C J Bannister, who also had a mill at Northiam, for about a year until the mill ceased working in 1912.

A sail blew off, and the mill quickly became derelict. The fantail and shutters were taken down, and in 1926 the stage was taken down. An iron windpump was erected alongside the mill, and three water tanks were installed in the mill to supply nearby cottages and cowsheds. The smock was demolished in 1945 The base was left standing and used as a Scout hut for a time.

In 1997, planning permission was applied for, and granted, to build a replica mill on the existing mill base, with the tower being used as living accommodation and a wind turbine for generating electricity. The new building was to replicate the former windmill, with five sails like the original mill had.

== Description ==
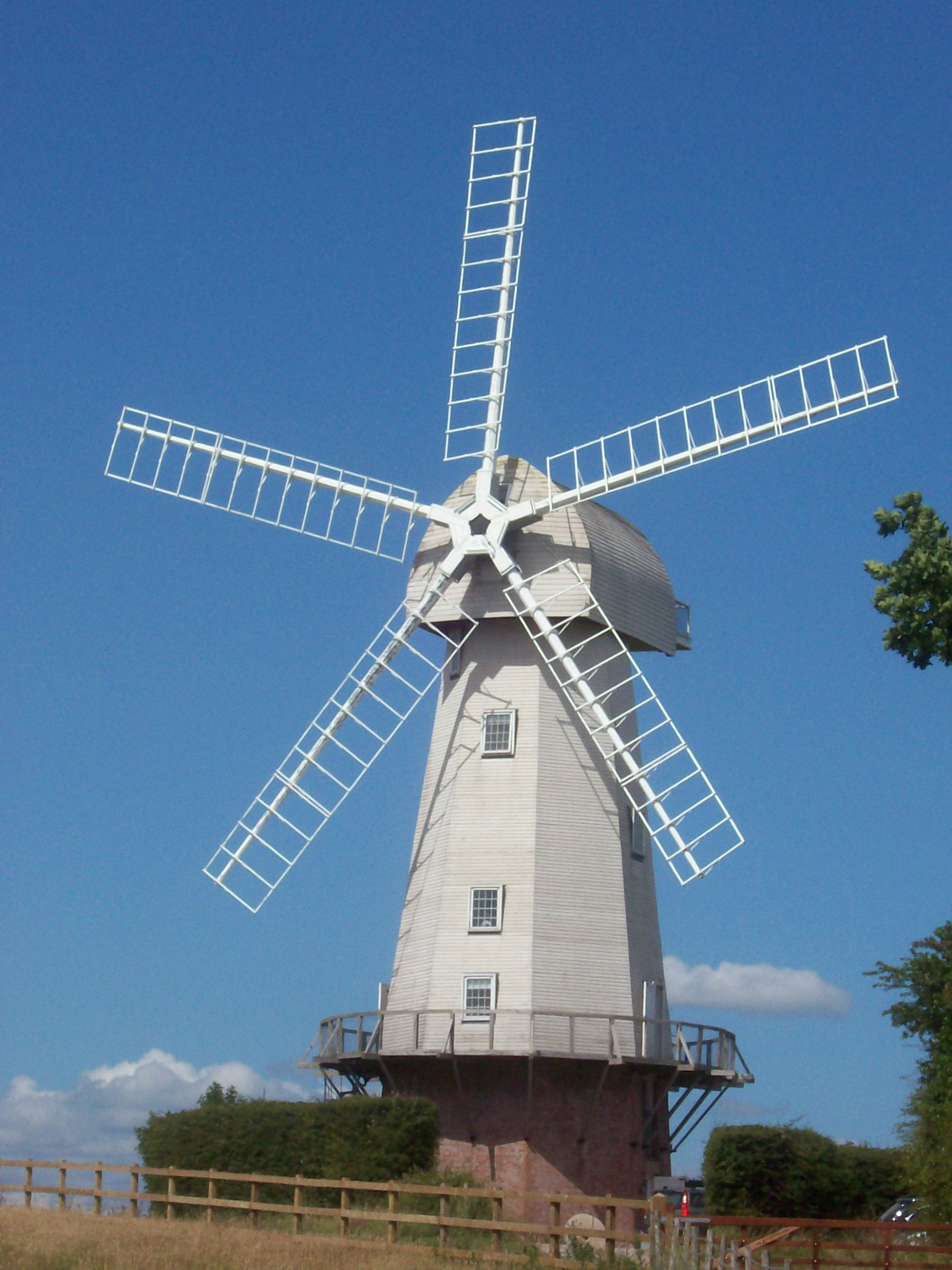
The replica, 2008

Ringle Crouch Green Mill was a four-storey smock mill on a two-storey brick base, with a Kentish-style cap carrying five single patent sails on a cast-iron windshaft. It was winded by a fantail. There was a stage at second-floor level. The mill drove four pairs of millstones.

The reconstructed mill has a four-storey smock on the original two-storey mill base, with the cap of a different design to the original, and lacking a fantail. The sails are 12.5 metres (41 ft) long each. The generator is rated at about 20 kilowatts (27 hp) capacity.

== Millers ==
- James Collins 1844 -
- Edward Collins Sr. - 1911
- Edward & Harry Collins 1911
- C J Bannister 1911 - 1912

References for above:-
