= Town Mill, Sutton Valence =

Windmill in the UK, 1720s-1945

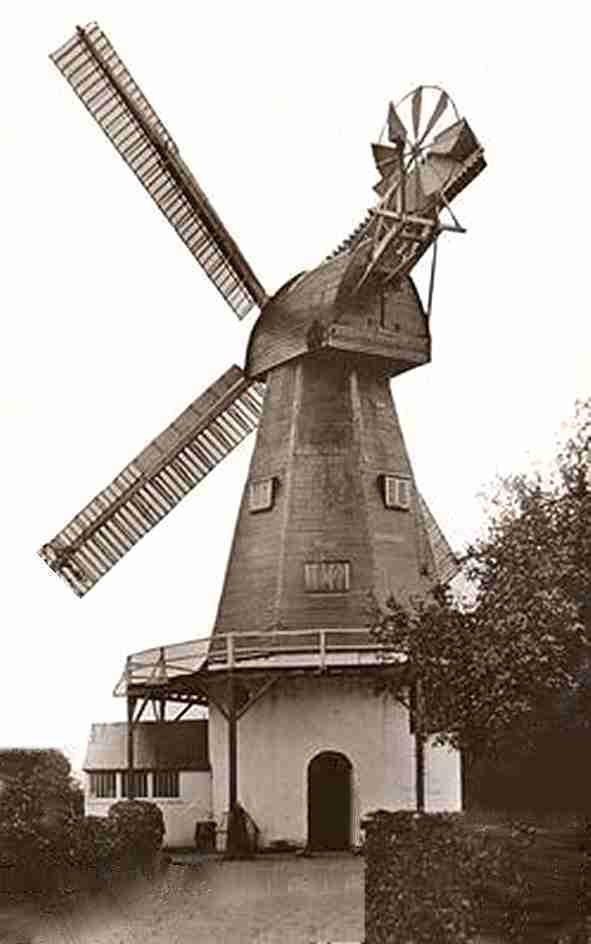
- Town Mill, Sutton Valence c.1890
- Interactive map of Town Mill, Sutton Valence

Origin
- Mill name: Town Mill
- Mill location: Sutton Valence, Kent
- Grid reference: TQ 815 493
- Coordinates: 51°12′50″N 0°35′50″E

Information
- Purpose: Corn mill
- Type: Smock mill
- Storeys: Three-storey smock
- Base storeys: Two-storey base
- Smock sides: Eight
- No. of sails: Four
- Type of sails: Patent sails
- Windshaft: Cast iron
- Winding: Fantail
- Fantail blades: Eight
- Auxiliary power: Gas engine
- No. of pairs of millstones: Three pairs, plus one pair driven by engine
- Year lost: Demolished 1945
- Other information: Base remains, house converted

Town Mill was a smock mill at Sutton Valence, Kent, United Kingdom. It was built in the 1720s and worked by wind until 1914. It was working by engine into the 1930s and was demolished in 1945.

== History ==
Town Mill was built c.1720. It was not marked on Andrew, Dury and Herbert's 1769 map of Kent, but was marked on the 1819 Ordnance Survey map. In 1798, the cap and sails were blown off. The mill was rebuilt, with the base being raised from one to two storeys. This made the mill the second tallest in Kent, beaten only by Union Mill, Cranbrook. In the 1870s, artist Miss Pooley was sitting on the stage making a sketch was killed when the mill was started and she was hit by a sweep. The person who started the mill was unaware of her presence. In 1872, Canterbury millwright Thomas Holman fitted a new windshaft, sails and fantail. The mill was working by wind until 1914, when it was damaged in a gale. It was then worked by an auxiliary gas engine until at least 1933. The mill was damaged by a flying bomb during World War II. It was consequently demolished in 1945, leaving the base, which was house converted in the late 1960s.

== Description ==
Town mill was a three storey smock mill on a two storey base. It was powered by four patent sails carried on a cast iron windshaft. An eight-bladed fantail turned the mill into wind. The mill drove three pairs of millstones, with a fourth pair driven by the engine.
