= Rodmersham Green Windmill =

Windmill in Kent, England

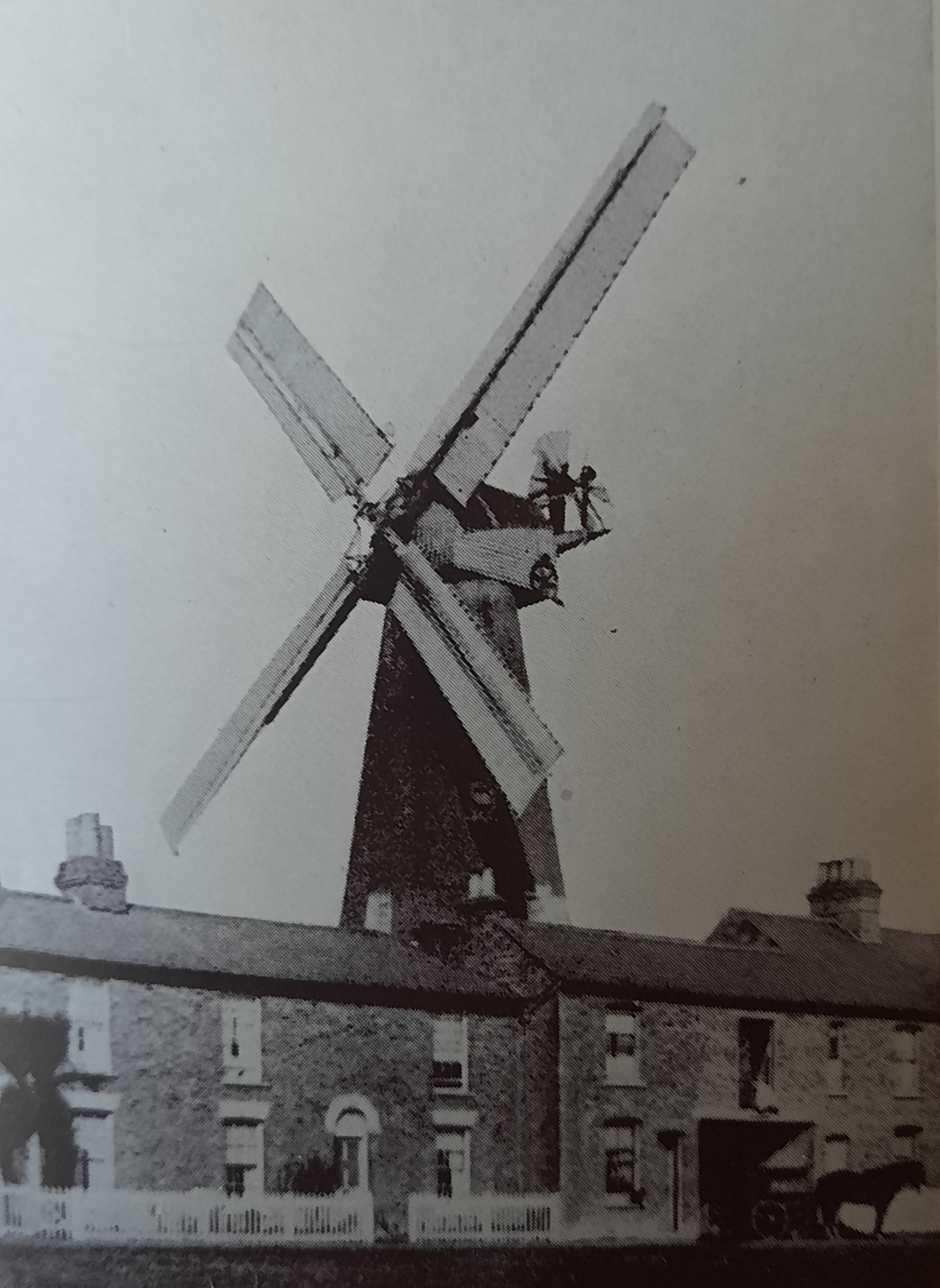
- Rodmersham Green Windmill, pre-1918
- Interactive map of Rodmersham Green Windmill

Origin
- Mill location: Rodmersham, Kent
- Grid reference: TQ 916 614
- Coordinates: 51°19′10″N 0°44′54″E
- Year built: 1835

Information
- Purpose: Corn mill
- Type: Tower mill
- Storeys: Four-storey tower
- No. of sails: Four
- Type of sails: Patent sails
- Windshaft: Cast iron
- Winding: Fantail
- Fantail blades: Eight
- No. of pairs of millstones: Three pairs
- Year lost: Demolished 1969

Rodmersham Green Windmill was a tower mill at Rodmersham, Kent, United Kingdom. It was built in 1835 and worked by wind until 1917. The mill was listed as Grade III. It was demolished in 1969 amidst much local protest.

== History ==
Rodmersham Green Windmill was built in 1835. It stood 5 furlongs (1,000 m) west south west of St. Nicholas Church, Rodmersham, on the highest point for many miles around. The miller was T. Witham in 1878. E. Hopper took over in 1898. He ran the mill until 1917, when his employee was conscripted and trade died down. The mill was then dismantled. During World War II, the mill was used by the Royal Observer Corps as a look-out post. The cap was removed at this time.

Post-war, the mill was listed as Grade III by Swale Rural District Council. Several approaches to its owner were made in the 1960s for the purchase and house conversion of the mill, but these were rejected. By February 1967, Kent County Council had given permission for the mill's demolition. The Committee for the Protection of Rural Kent wrote to the owner that month, asking for the mill to be saved. On 26 August 1968, an attempt was made to demolish the mill. The attempt was thwarted by the villagers, who arranged local and national press and television cover. The local MP, Terence Boston became involved. The mill was demolished on 22 September 1969. The mill was first set afire, before being demolished by bulldozers. One villager had barricaded himself in the mill, and was treated roughly by the contractors when he was removed, sustaining a broken tooth.

== Description ==
The mill was a four storey tower mill, topped with a Kent type cap. Four patent sails were carried on a cast iron windshaft. The mill drove three pairs of millstones - two French Burr and one Peak, and a flour machine.
