= Swingate Mill, Guston =

Windmill in Guston, Kent, England

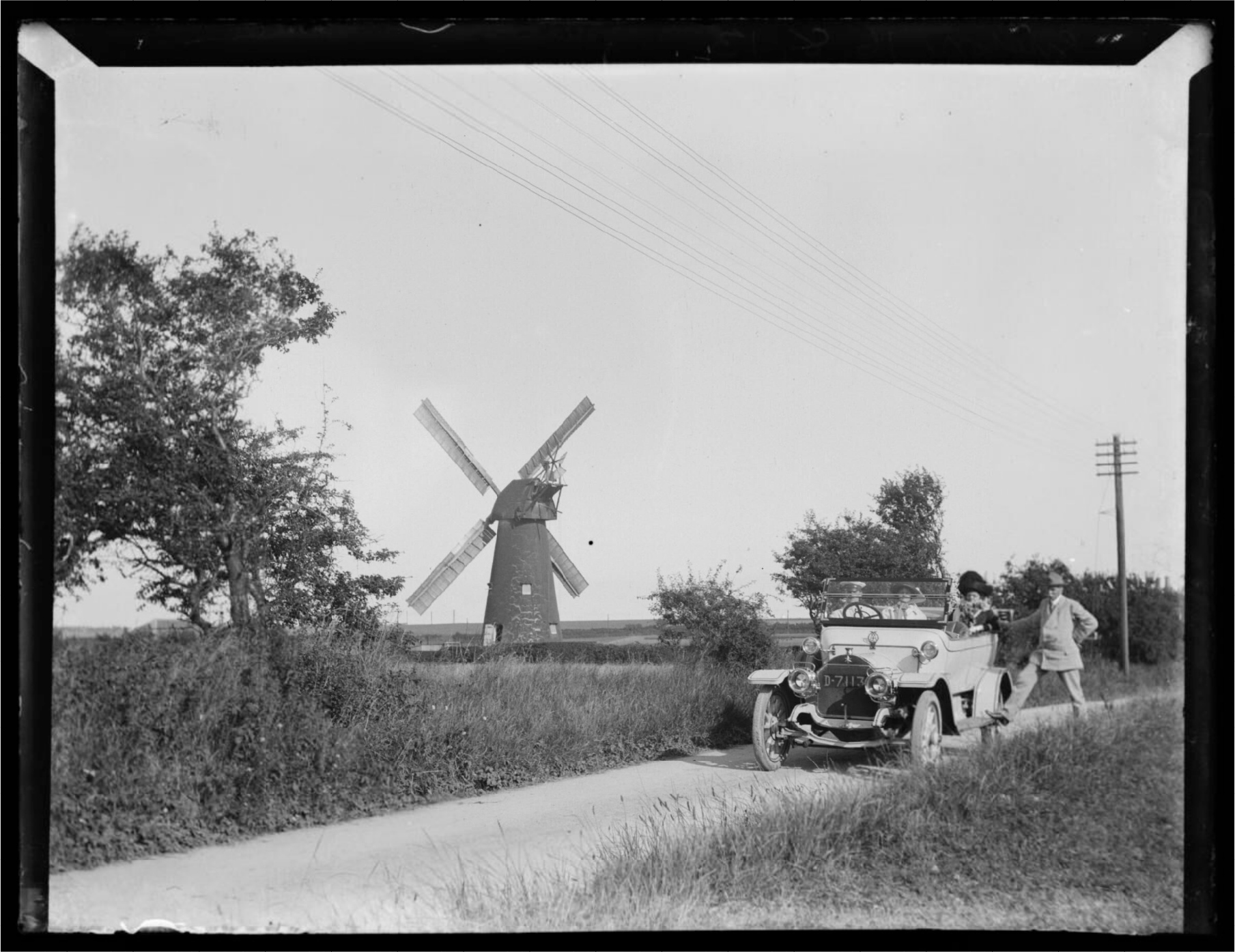
- Swingate Mill, 1913
- Interactive map of Swingate Mill, Guston

Origin
- Grid reference: TR 334 444
- Coordinates: 51°9′3″N 1°20′4.5″E
- Year built: 1849

Information
- Purpose: Corn mill
- Type: Tower mill
- Storeys: Four storeys
- No. of sails: Four
- Type of sails: Patent sails
- Windshaft: Cast iron
- Winding: Fantail
- Fantail blades: Six blades
- No. of pairs of millstones: Three pairs

Swingate Mill is a Grade II listed tower mill in Guston, Kent, England that was built in 1849.

== History ==
Swingate Mill was built for John Mummery in 1849, incorporating the cap, sails, windshaft and brake wheel from a windmill that had been intended to be erected on the Rope Walk, Dover, but which was not built owing to fears that it would not function properly at the proposed site. The mill was working by wind until 1943, when the sails were damaged by enemy fire. A new pair of sails were fitted in 1947, but the mill was tail-winded in 1959 and lost its cap and sails.

== Description ==
Swingate Mill is a four-storey brick tower mill with a Kentish-style cap. It had four patent sails carried on a cast-iron windshaft. The mill was winded by a fantail. There was a stage at first-floor level. The mill drove three pairs of millstones underdrift and all the machinery was cast iron.

== Millers ==
- John Mummery 1849 - 1907
- Ebeneezer A Mummery 1907 - 1918
- George Sheaff 1922 - 1930
- Thompsett 1930 - 1947

References for above:-
