= Black Mill, Whitstable =

Windmill in Whitstable, Kent, England

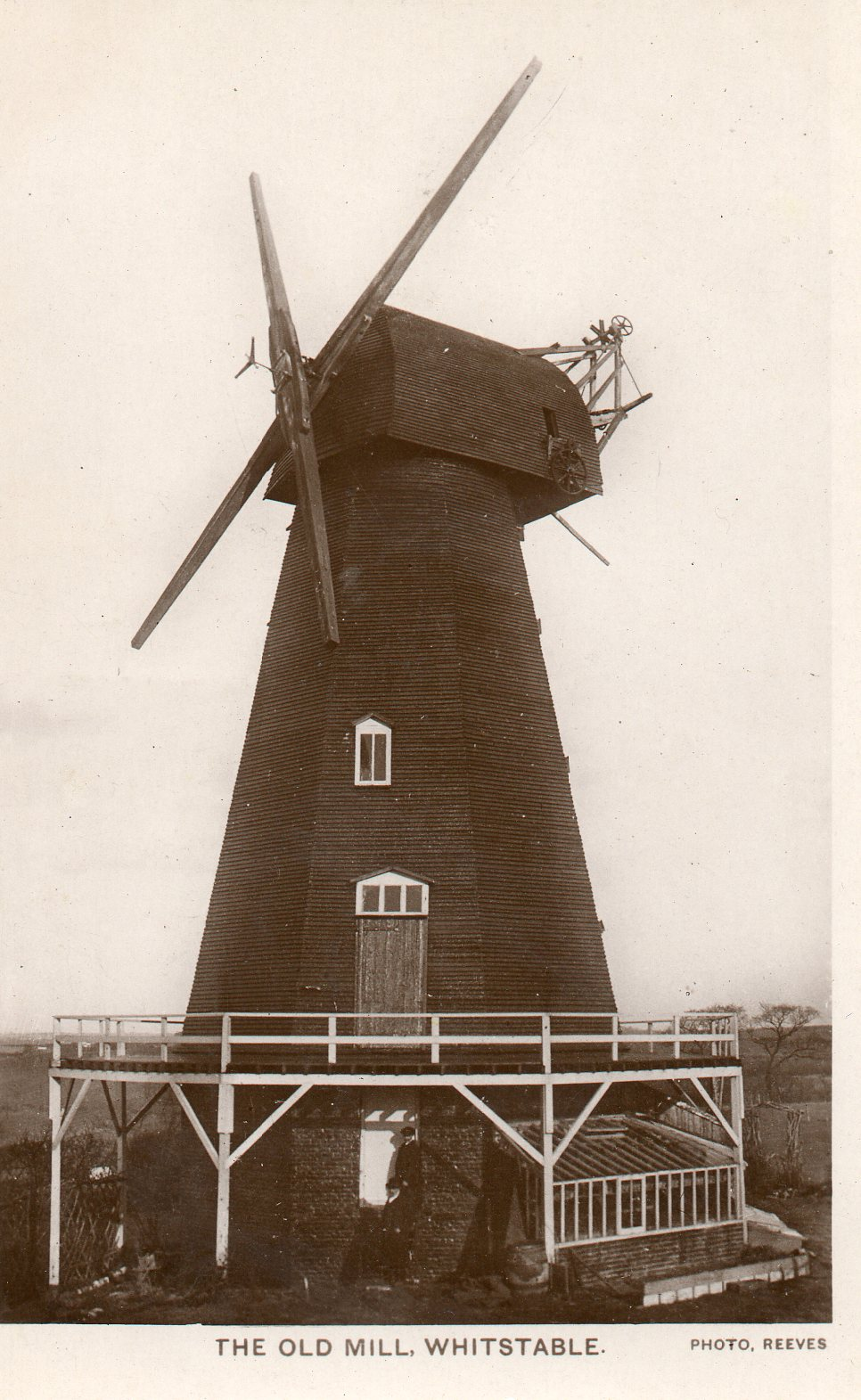

Origin
- Grid reference: TR 105 652
- Coordinates: 51°20′46.5″N 1°1′20″E
- Year built: 1815

Information
- Purpose: Corn mill
- Type: Smock mill
- Storeys: Four-storey smock
- Base storeys: Single-storey base
- Smock sides: Eight-sided
- No. of sails: Four
- Type of sails: Patent sails
- Windshaft: Cast iron
- Winding: Fantail
- Fantail blades: Six blades
- No. of pairs of millstones: Three pairs

Black Mill, or Borstal Hill Mill is a smock mill in Whitstable, Kent, England that was built in 1815. It is now a part of a private residence at the end of Millers Court.

== History ==
Black Mill was built in 1815. A mill that previously stood on the site was marked on Bowen's map of 1736. The mill had been painted white when built, but was tarred in 1885, thus gaining its name of Black Mill. Trinity House had to be notified, as the mill was a navigational landmark for sailors. The mill last worked circa 1905 and in 1928 was converted into a studio by the artist Laurence Irving, the grandson of Sir Henry Irving. The mill was later converted into a motel. The converted tower still contains the major milling machinery, and externally bears stocks and a dummy fantail.

== Description ==
Black mill is a four-storey smock mill on a single-storey brick base. There was a stage at first-floor level. It had four patent sails carried on a cast-iron windshaft. The Brake wheel survives. This drove a cast-iron Wallower mounted on a wooden Upright Shaft. The Great Spur Wheel also survives. The mill drove three pairs of millstones overdrift. It was winded by a fantail.

== Millers ==
- Lawes & Carr 1839 - 1845
- William Carr 1845
- Jonathan Rye
- Henry Somerford 1860 - 1866
- James Callingham 1866 -
- Callingham Bros. - 1899
- George & William Dawking 1899 - 1905

References for above:-

== Gallery ==
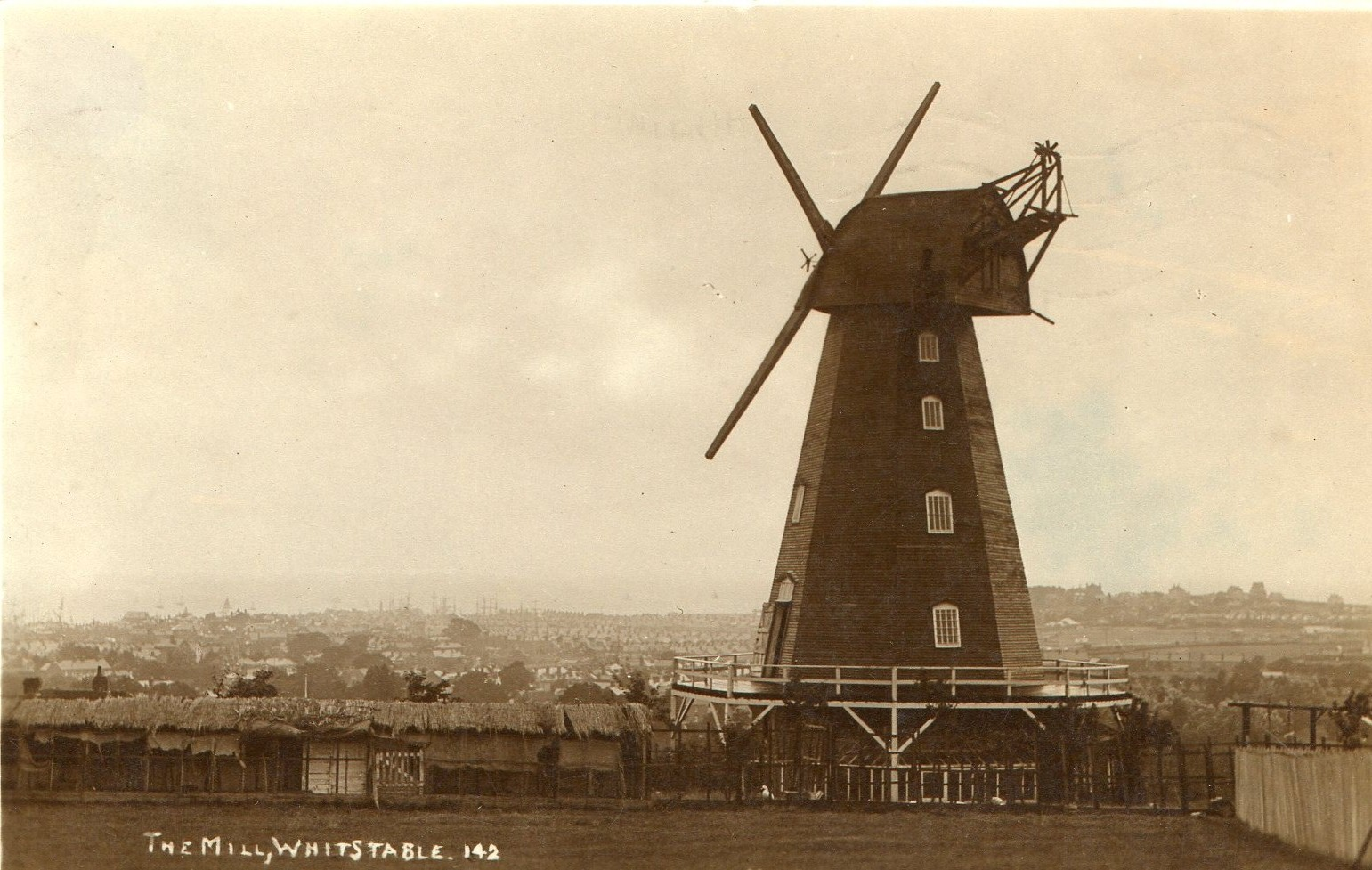
1908

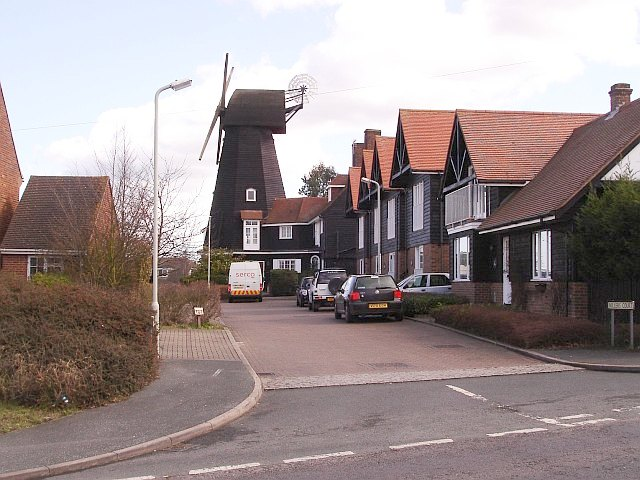
2006
