= Oare Windmill =

Tower mill in Kent, England

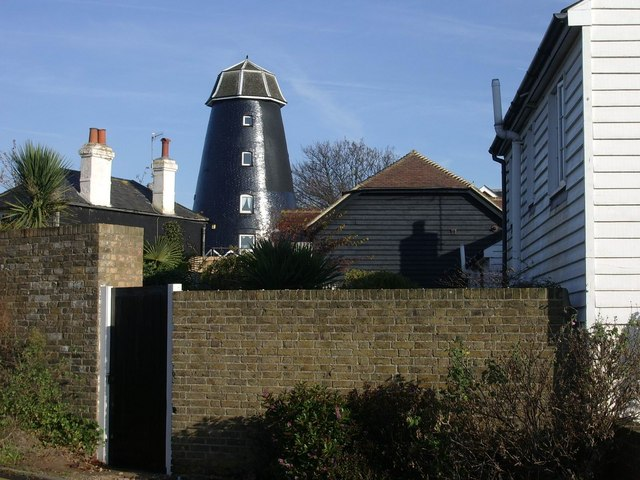
- The house converted mill
- Interactive map of Oare Windmill

Origin
- Grid reference: TR 009 625
- Coordinates: 51°19′35″N 0°52′57″E
- Year built: Late eighteenth or early nineteenth century

Information
- Purpose: Corn mill
- Type: Tower mill
- Storeys: Five storeys
- No. of sails: Four
- Type of sails: Patent sails
- Windshaft: Cast iron
- Winding: Fantail
- No. of pairs of millstones: Four pairs

Oare Mill is a Grade II listed house converted tower mill in Oare, Kent, England that was built in the late eighteenth or early nineteenth century.

== History ==
Oare mill was built in the late eighteenth or early nineteenth century. It was marked on the 1819–42 Ordnance Survey map and Greenwood's map of 1821. The mill was working until June 1919. There was a steam engine, the boiler of which once exploded and damaged the Mill Cottages and Windmill Inn. Photographs show that the cap was still on the mill in 1952, but the roof had gone by 1963. In that year the derelict mill was converted into a house, retaining some machinery. A new domed polygonal roof fitted to replace the original cap.

== Description ==
Oare Mill is a five-storey tower mill with a stage at first-floor level. It formerly had four single patent sails carried on a cast-iron windshaft, and a Kentish-style cap. The cap was the largest on any mill in Kent, measuring 17 feet (5.18 m) by 14 feet (4.27 m) in plan and 9 feet 9 inches (2.97 m) high. The mill was winded by a fantail. It drove four pairs of millstones overdrift. The wallower remains, mounted at the top of the Upright Shaft, which is wooden and 18 inches (460 mm) square. The Great Spur Wheel also remains.

== Millers ==
- Elliott - 1819
- Thomas K Hope
- Robert Shrubsole
- Kennett 1841
- F Inge
- H W Elliott 1862
- Thomas K Hope 1878
- B Filmer
- Herbert Filmer 1882–1886
- F Ralph 1891
- Herbert Filmer Sep 1917 – Jun 1919

References for above:-
