= Edenbridge Windmill =

Tower mill in Edenbridge, Kent, England

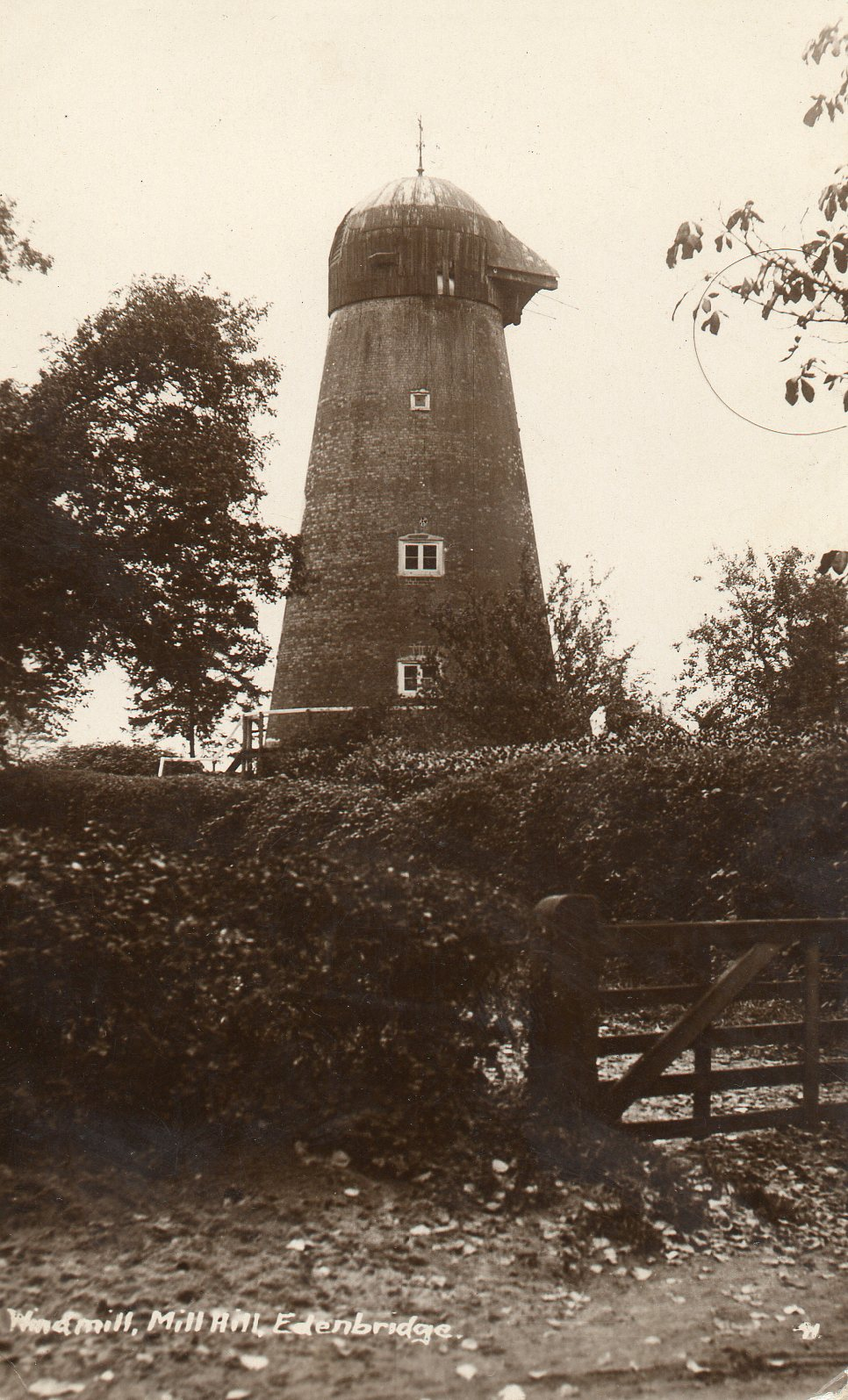
- Postcard,1917

Origin
- Mill name: Edenbridge Mill
- Grid reference: TQ 444 457
- Coordinates: 51°11′24″N 0°3′59.5″E
- Year built: 1815

Information
- Purpose: Corn mill
- Type: Tower mill
- Storeys: Five storeys
- No. of sails: Four
- Winding: Fantail

Edenbridge Mill is a Grade II listed house converted tower mill in Edenbridge, Kent, England. It is on the west side of Mill Hill, just north of the hospital.

== History ==
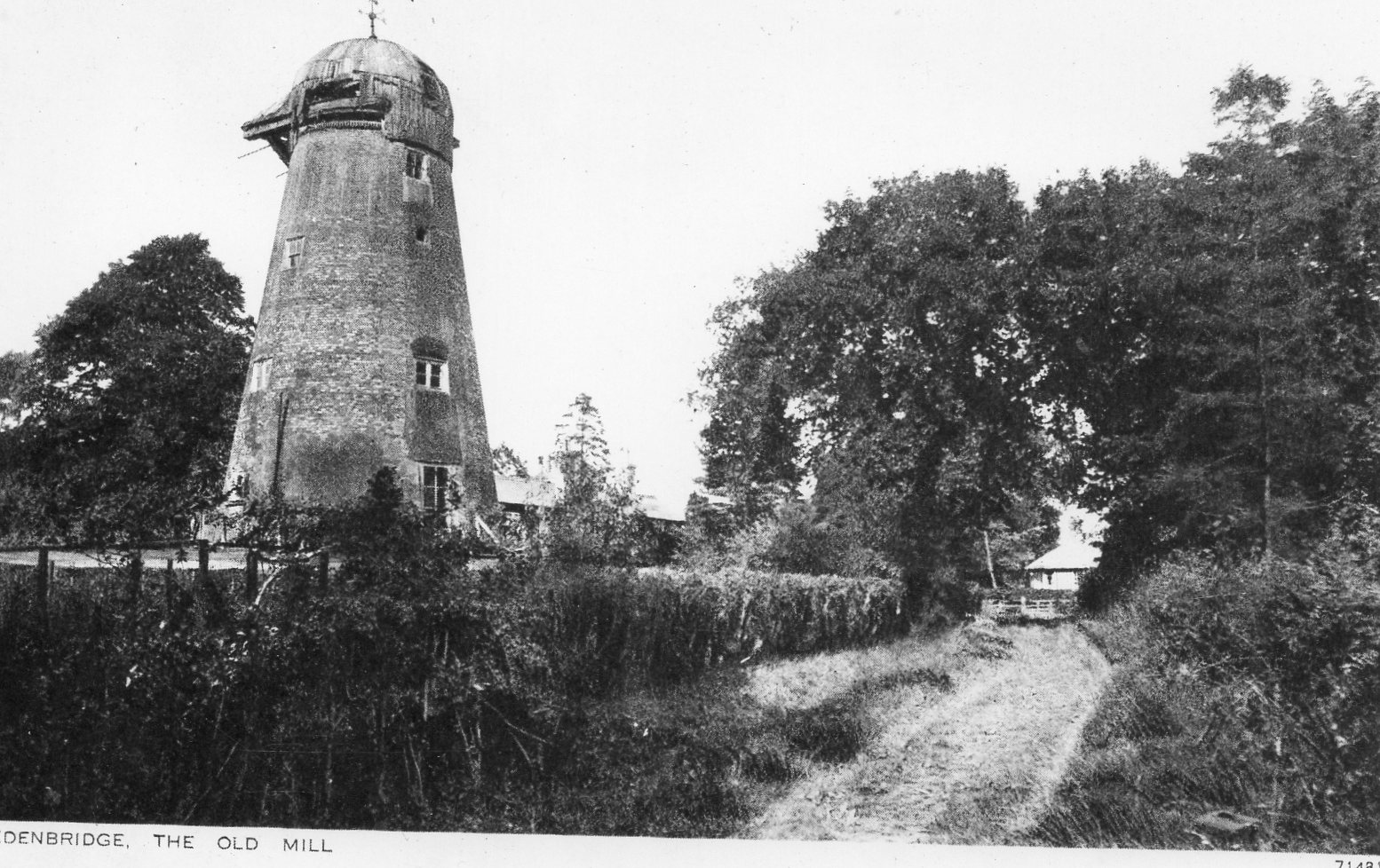
The mill in the 1920s

Edenbridge Mill was built in 1815. A mill was marked on the 1858–72 and 1903-10 Ordnance Survey maps. There is a stone inscribed 1812 A Friend. There is a red brick just above the large window on the first floor with 1812 also inscribed

William Ashby, the Westerham millwright worked on the mill in October 1825, fitting a new neck bearing of the windshaft, and did some repairs to the sails in January 1826. The cap was removed in 1937 and replaced by a flat roof.

== Description ==
Edenbridge Mill is a five-storey brick tower mill with a domed cap. It had four sails carried on a cast iron windshaft. The mill was winded by a fantail. The mill retains the Wallower, upright shaft and iron Great Spur Wheel, which drove the millstones overdrift. Old photographs show that there was a stage at the first floor level.

The property was sold in 1990 to a developer who over a nine-year period converted the building to residential use, making only minor changes to the outside. Two small windows, both on the third floor, were made larger. The air raid shelter was removed. The external staircase shown in earlier photographs was replaced with a gradient staircase that was compliant with building regulations.

== Millers ==
- Edward Bridger 1825 - 1839
- H Sisley 1844
- James Mellish 1845 - 1849
- Stanford - 1854
- Moses Brooks 1864 - 1874
- James Mellish & Son - 1886

References for above:-
