= History of the Huguenots in Kent =

History of the Huguenot refugees, community, and legacy in Kent

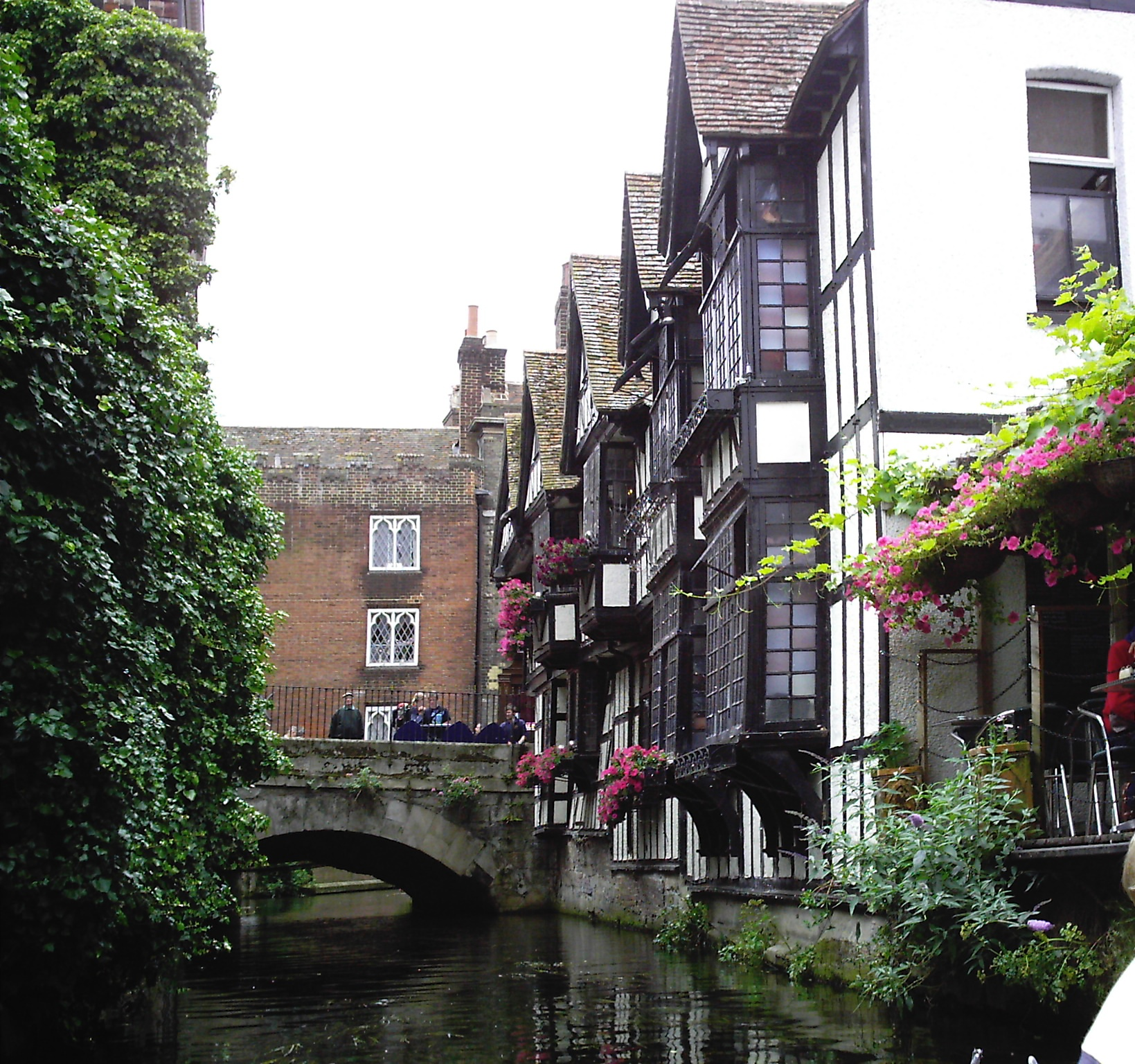
Houses of Huguenot weavers and woolcombers in Canterbury

The history of the Huguenots in Kent dates back to the mid 1500s.

== Early history ==
=== First Huguenot community and exodus ===
In the mid-16th century many Huguenots, experiencing persecution and conflict in France and the Low Countries, fled and resettled in Reformed regions such as England. Canterbury hosted the first congregation of Huguenots in England. This first Huguenot church in Canterbury was founded around 1548, in part by Jan Utenhove who relocated from Strasbourg, alongside Valérand Poullain and François de la Rivière. When Utenhove travelled to London in 1549, Francois de la Rivière remained to lead the congregation. With the accession of Mary I, the Huguenot residents of Canterbury were compelled to flee in 1553–4 alongside the English Marian exiles to Emden, Wesel, Zürich, Strasbourg, Frankfurt, and later Basel, Geneva, and Aarau.

=== Return and settlement at Sandwich ===
After the accession of Elizabeth I, a small number of Huguenots returned to London, including Jan Utenhove in 1559. On July 6th 1561, the Dutch Church of London were given license to send 20-25 Huguenot families to settle in Sandwich to revitalise its otherwise-dwindling economy. The settlers arrived before the end of December 1561 and the new community, including workmen and servants, numbered 406 souls. The church of St Peter was set aside for the use of Huguenots. They were also allowed to use the church of St Clement's. The presence of refugees in Sandwich began to grow rapidly with new settlers arriving from Flanders, Artois, and parts of Picardy. This included a number of Flemish refugees who landed on the coast near Deal and settled in Sandwich.

By 1568, the 25 original families sent to Sandwich, who were mostly Dutch and French, had been joined by 8 Walloon families who formed a separate congregation. In 1572 these congregations united and in 1573 the community was visited by the Queen. Around this time, the Huguenot population of Sandwich grew to comprise almost a third of the town's overall population. A small number of Huguenot gardeners moved to Wandsworth, Battersea, and Bermondsey to be closer to London.

=== Rye and other early settlements in Kent ===
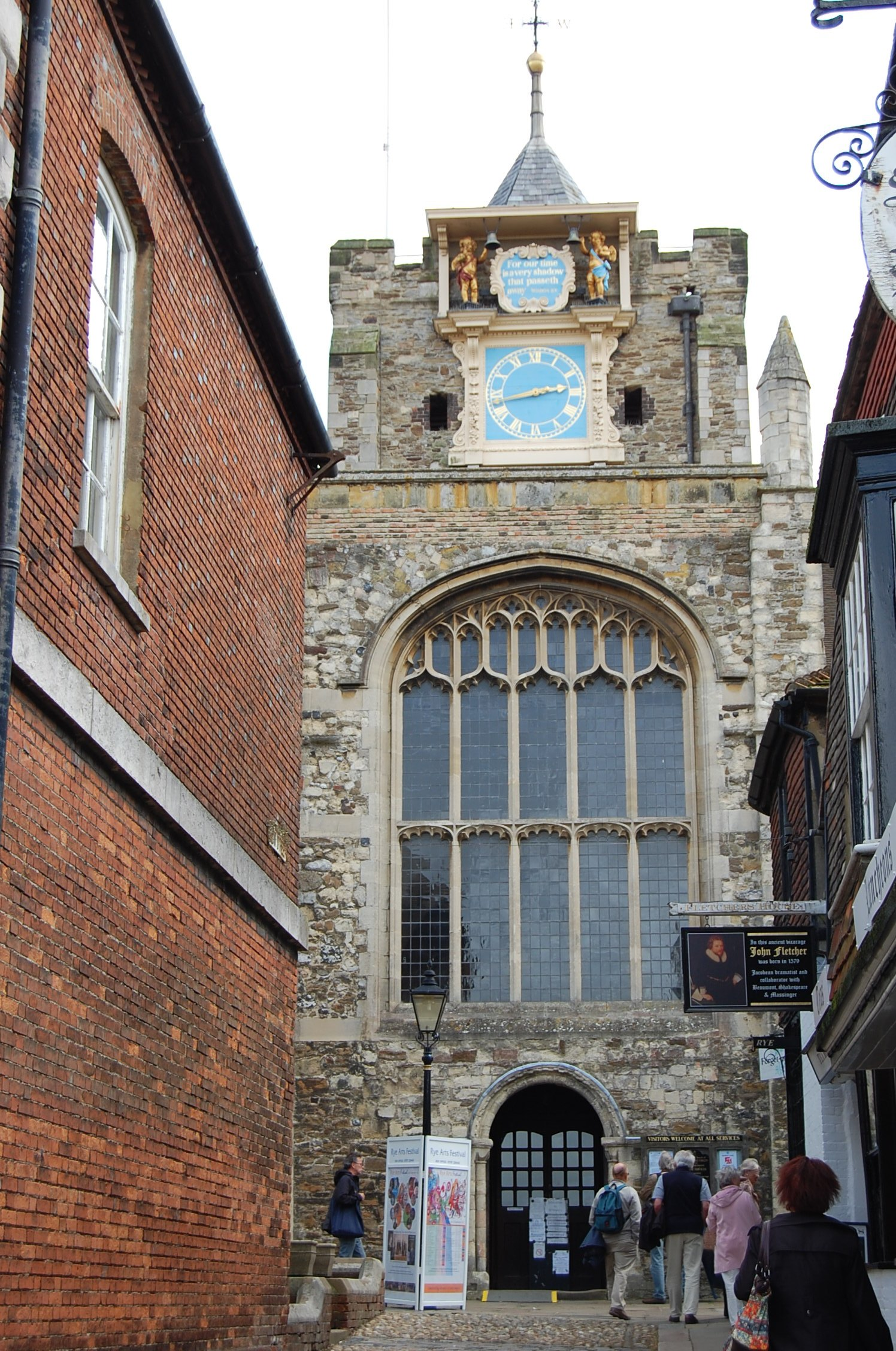
The clock and churchtower of St Mary's Church, Rye

The town of Rye, Sussex had a small refugee population in the early 1560s. While not being in Kent, the Huguenot community at Rye interacted primarily with those in Kent, and a large number of Huguenots migrated to towns in Kent. By May 1562, roughly 500 Huguenots had arrived from France and in that month two more ships from Dieppe, filled with refugees, arrived. More arrived throughout the year, including another boat from Dieppe in November with 150 passengers. More boats continued arriving into the winter. The clock of St Mary's Church was made in c.1562 by a Huguenot named Lewys Billiard. Huguenots were temporarily allowed to use the parish church for part of the day.

During the winter of 1568-9, a number of Huguenots crossed the English Channel and landed in Rye. One of the refugees was Hector Hamon, a minister of Bacqueville, Normandy. When the Huguenot community at Rye became overcrowded, Hamon relocated to nearby Winchelsea and established a congregation. In 1572, due to the St. Bartholomew's Day massacre of that year, more than 641 refugees arrived comprising a diverse range of classes and professions which included gentlemen, merchants, doctors, ministers, students, schoolmasters, artisans, labourers and others. The amount of Huguenots in Rye numbered over 1500 in 1582 and 1534 in 1584, amounting to over a third of the total population. Due to overcrowding, the numbers lessened after 1590.

There were other significant landings of refugees at Dover. In 1621, after an arrival of refugees, Huguenot ministers were granted use of St Mary's Church for part of the day. In the early-17th century, a census listed 78 French and 13 Walloon refugees including 2 ministers, 3 physicians, 8 merchants, 2 schoolmasters, 13 drapers, 8 weavers and woolcombers, and more, residing at Dover. Refugee churches were also created in Maidstone and Faversham. There is very little record of the refugees or Huguenot church at Faversham. At Maidstone, Dutch and Flemings settled in 1573 and were granted use of St Faith's Chapel.

=== Early development of the community at Canterbury ===
Although there was a proposal by the civic officials of Canterbury in July 1567 to establish a settlement of strangers in the city, no Huguenots arrived until late 1574 when 18 Huguenot families from the settlements of Rye and Winchelsea, led by Hector Hamon, crossed the High Weald and entered the city. Hamon, along with Vincent Primont (a schoolmaster who arrived in Rye in November 1572), wrote a petition on behalf of the new Huguenot community of Canterbury in which they requested they have free exercise of their religion, be assigned a place of worship, and that their schoolmaster may teach both their own young and those who desire to learn French, among other things. In early 1575, Articles of Agreement between the civic officials of Canterbury and the Huguenots were ratified, granting the community free exercise of their religion, and allowing Huguenots no further taxation than English inhabitants of the city. Moreover, the Huguenots were allowed use of the church of St Alphege. In a letter dated March 1575, Hector Hamon styled himself "Minister of the Church in Canterbury" and a number of Huguenot children, including those of Vincent Primont, were baptised in the church of St Alphege.

In June 1575, the majority of the Walloon refugees of Sandwich relocated to Canterbury, leaving the original 25 Huguenot families and a small number of Walloon refugees. This was due to the authorities of Sandwich believing the community to have become too large. The city of Canterbury was able to accommodate such a population increase due to the declining pilgrimages following the destruction of the tomb of Thomas Becket. Among the new settlers in Canterbury was Antoine Lescaillet, formerly a Walloon minister in Sandwich. On the arrival of the Walloons in Canterbury, the two congregations united with Hector Hamon and Antoine Lescaillet jointly conducting the services in the church of St Alphege, however by the start of 1576 they had been granted use of the crypt of Canterbury Cathedral as their church. In July 1576 Hamon returned to France, leaving Lescaillet as the sole minister of the Church of the Crypt.

== History of the Huguenot community at Canterbury ==
=== Administration of the Consistory and Church of the Crypt ===
The Church of the Crypt and the Consistory that developed swiftly became the nucleus of the Huguenot community in Canterbury. The Consistory was composed of ministers and elders, and was often associated with the deacons. Elders and Deacons of the church were annually elected, in the first few years by direct vote of the people but later by vote of the Consistory. In the first election, held on Christmas Day 1576, five elders were chosen and inducted, followed by six deacons (four of whom had been deacons at Sandwich in 1571). The next election was held Christmas Day 1577, electing again 5 elders and 6 deacons. In 1578, only three elders and three deacons were chosen. Records of the Consistory, titled the Actes du Consistoire, were written from July 1576 by minister Antoine Lescaillet himself.

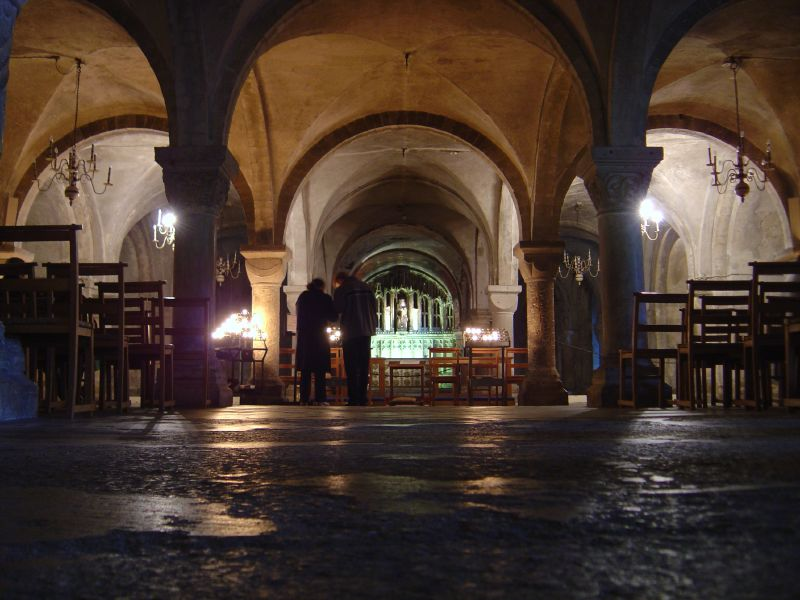
The crypt of Canterbury Cathedral

Ministers and Elders were the governors of the Huguenot community in Canterbury, being supported by the city's civic officials. According to historian F.W. Cross, “each separate settlement of the strangers constituted in effect a small religious republic modelled after that of Geneva, but with certain modifications of the more severe system of Calvin.” To effectively govern its population, the Consistory divided the Huguenot population of Canterbury into four quarters for administrative purposes and was given the responsibility for disciplining the community by the Mayor of Canterbury however did not establish a policing body until 1582. In October 1582, the Consistory elected 12 men to this policing body: two elders, two deacons, two woolcombers, three passementiers, and a tailor. They were sworn in by the Mayor and became an authoritative and respected court. When an offender refused to submit to the authority of the court of the Strangers' court, they appealed to the Mayor who then had the offender arrested.

Also in 1582, the privileges of the Huguenot community at Canterbury were challenged by the Anglican Ecclesiastical Court, and the Consistory successfully defended their privileges. The Church of the Crypt did not only serve the Huguenot citizens of Canterbury, but also the few remaining Walloons in Sandwich who were allowed to attend the church at Canterbury as the congregations in Sandwich were mostly in Flemish. Despite the many responsibilities of the church and Consistory, they were very poor in the early years of settlement.

Antoine Lescaillet died from illness in January 1595/6 after being the preeminent minister at Canterbury for over 20 years. He was succeeded by Samuel le Chevalier, sent by the Dutch Church of London, who became the sole minister and was such for the following 20 years. In 1617, Samuel le Chevalier was succeeded in the role by Jean Bulteel and Philippe Delmé who served as joint ministers.

=== Huguenot population and economy of Canterbury ===
The Huguenot population of Canterbury grew significantly following the St. Bartholomew's Day massacre of 1572. In 1597, after an inquiry by the Consistory, it was found that the congregation including men, women, and young children numbered 2068. The majority of the foreign-born Huguenots residing in Canterbury between 1590 and 1630 were born in the border-land stretching on the border of Artois and Flanders. Many were also from the Counties of Boulogne, Hainaut, Ponthieu, and Amiens; the Prince-Bishoprics of Tournaisis and Cambrésis; and the Pale of Calais. Particular cities included Armentières, Tournai, Tourcoing, Lille, Valenciennes, Cambrai, Arras, Amiens, St-Amand, and Antwerp, while many came from rural villages on the river Lys. At the beginning of the 17th century, the number of refugees dropped due to the Edict of Nantes of 1598.

The original group of Huguenots in Canterbury who first settled in Winchelsea were skilled weavers of serge, taffeta, and bombazine while the settlers of 1575 were more skilled in wool-weaving, woolcombing, spinning, and dyeing. They were permitted to manufacture according to methods of Flanders, but not of England. Highly-manufactured products included baize, saye, and passementerie.

== Bibliography ==
- Cross, Francis W. (1898). History of the Walloon & Huguenot Church at Canterbury. Canterbury: Printed for the Huguenot Society of London.
- Hovenden, Robert (1891). The Registers of the Wallon or Strangers’ Church in Canterbury. Lymington: Printed for the Huguenot Society of London.
- Kershaw, Samuel W. (1885). Protestants from France in their English Home. London: Samson Low, Marston, Searle & Rivington.
- Smiles, Samuel (1867). The Huguenots: their Settlements, Churches, & Industries in England and Ireland. London: John Murray, Albermarle Street.
- Somner, William (1640). The Antiquities of Canterbury, or a survey of that ancient Citie, with the Suburbs, and Cathedrall. London: Printed by I.L. for Richard Thrale.
