= Canterbury =

Cathedral city in Kent, England

Coordinates: 51.28°N 1.08°E

- City
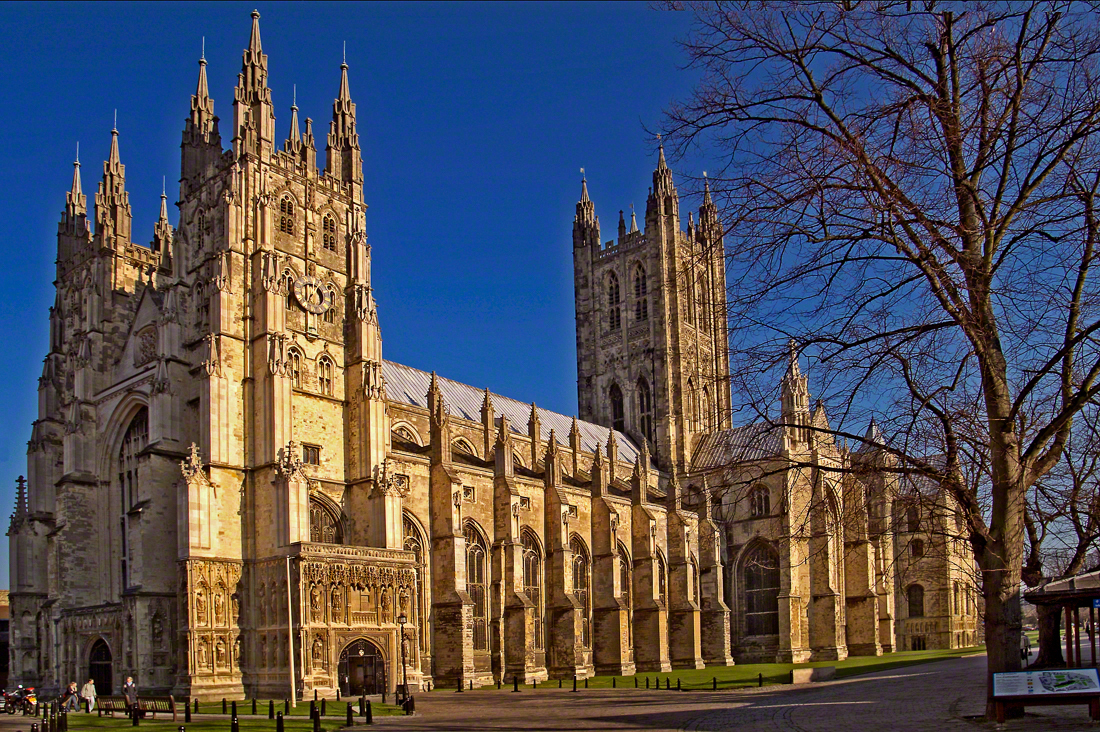
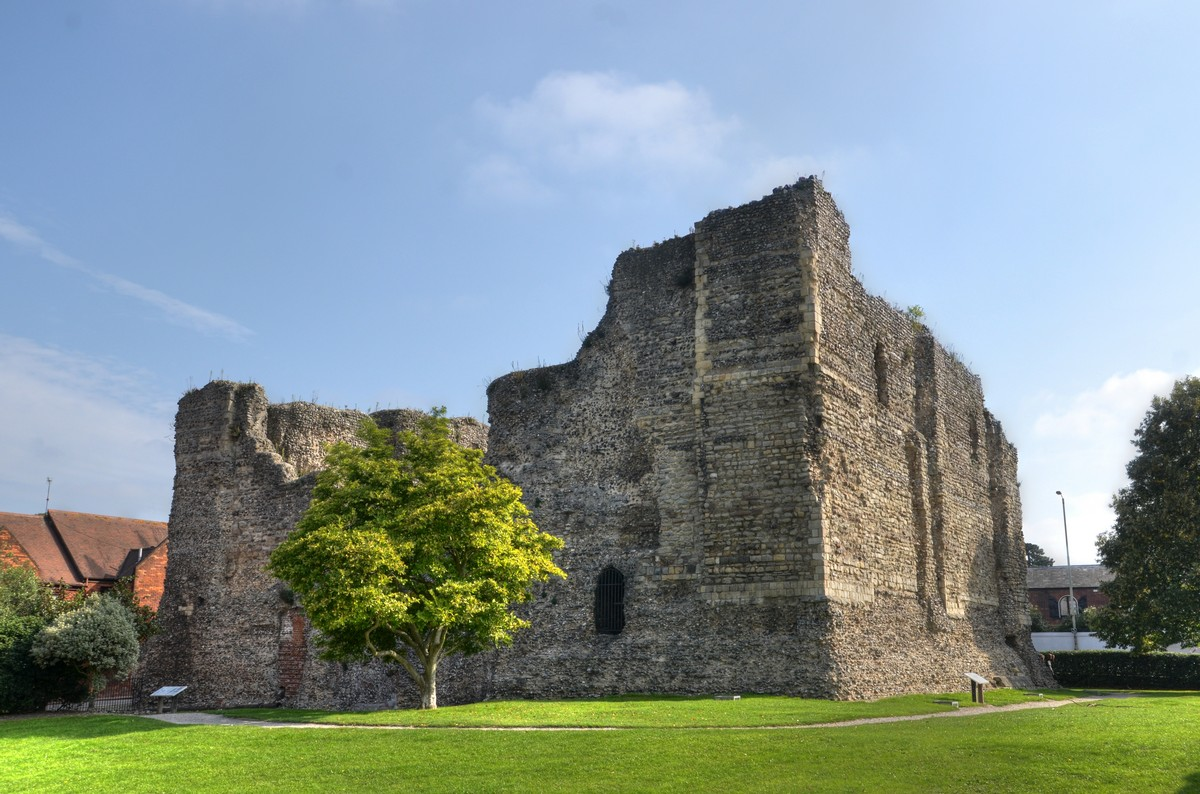
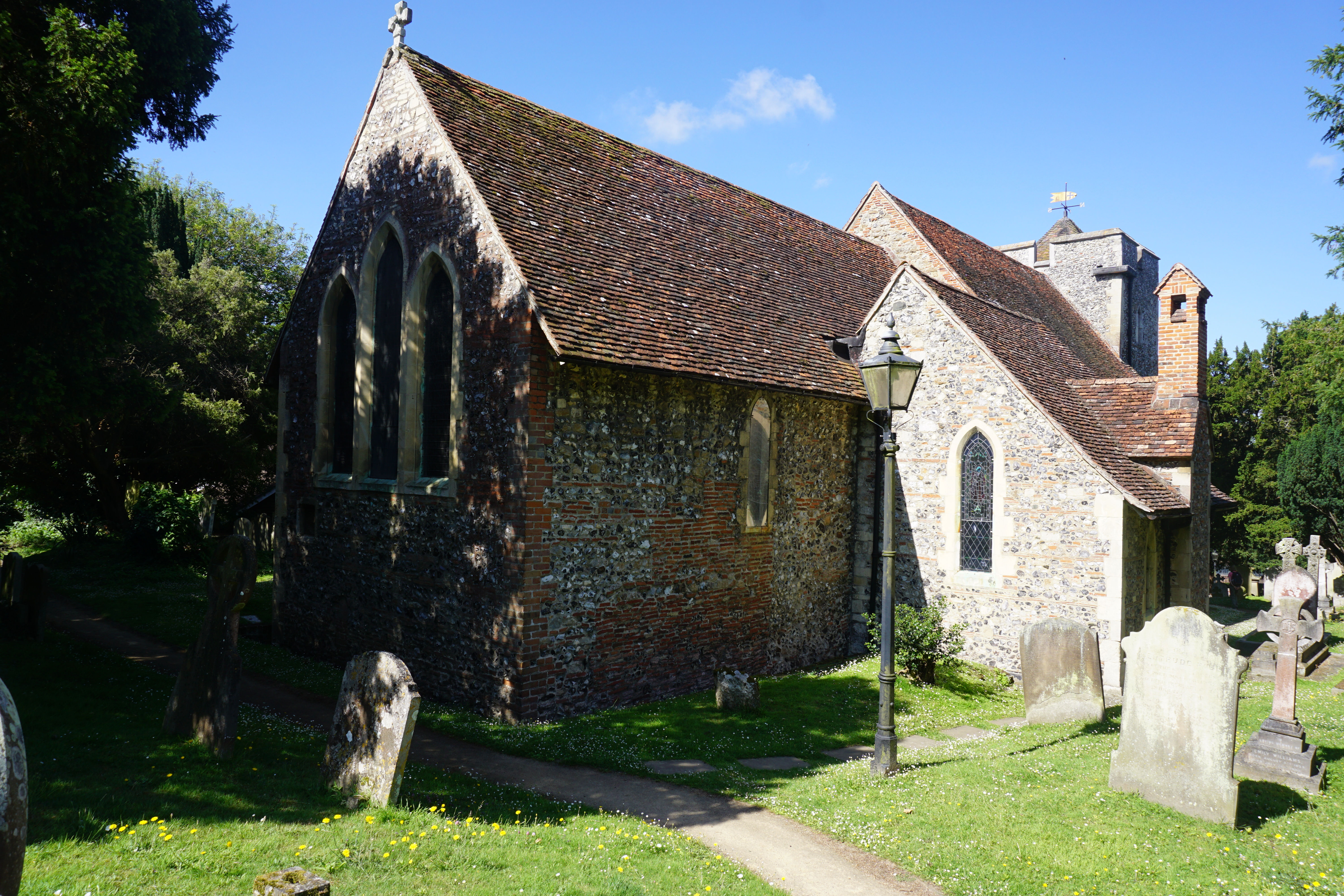
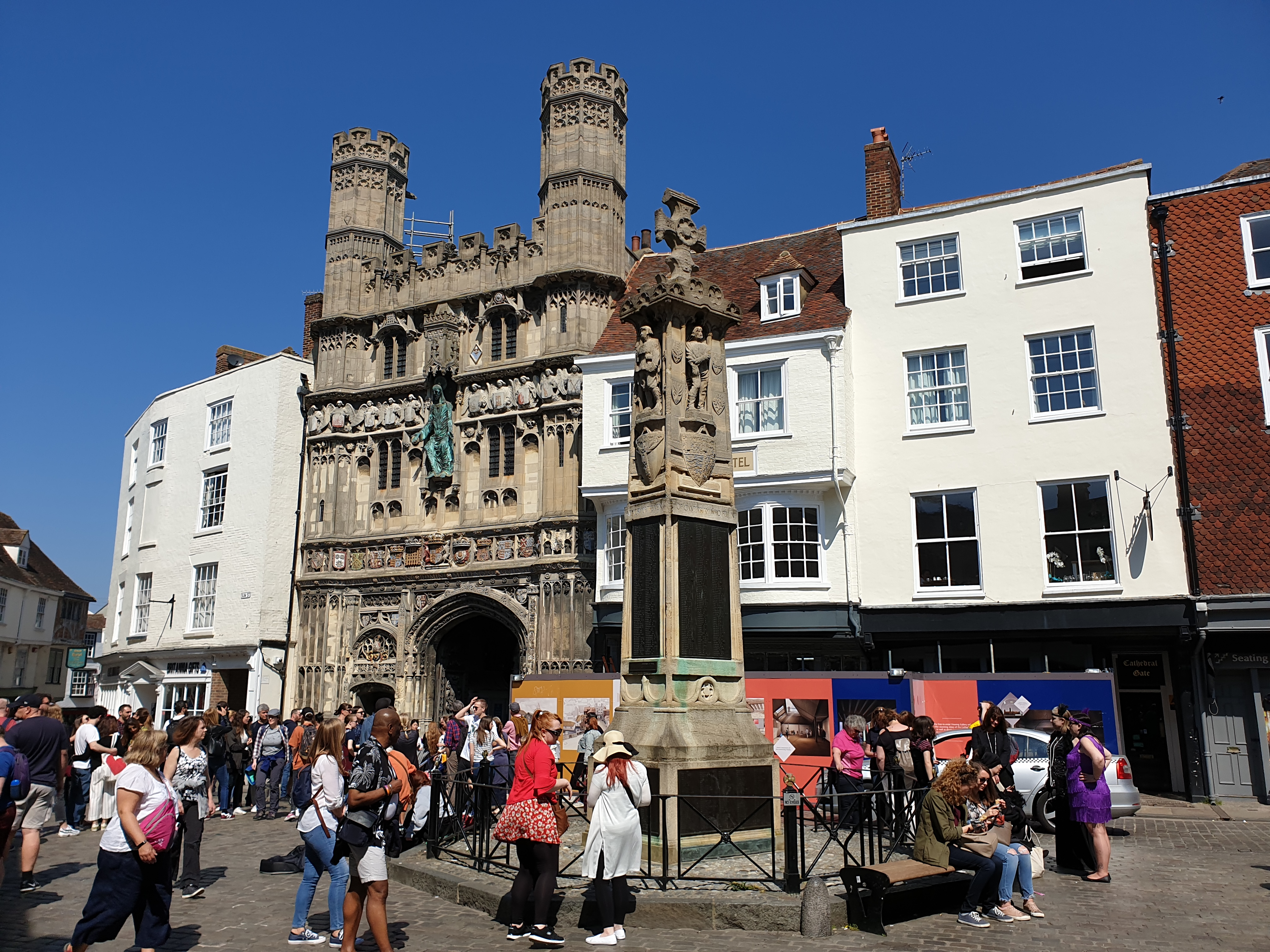
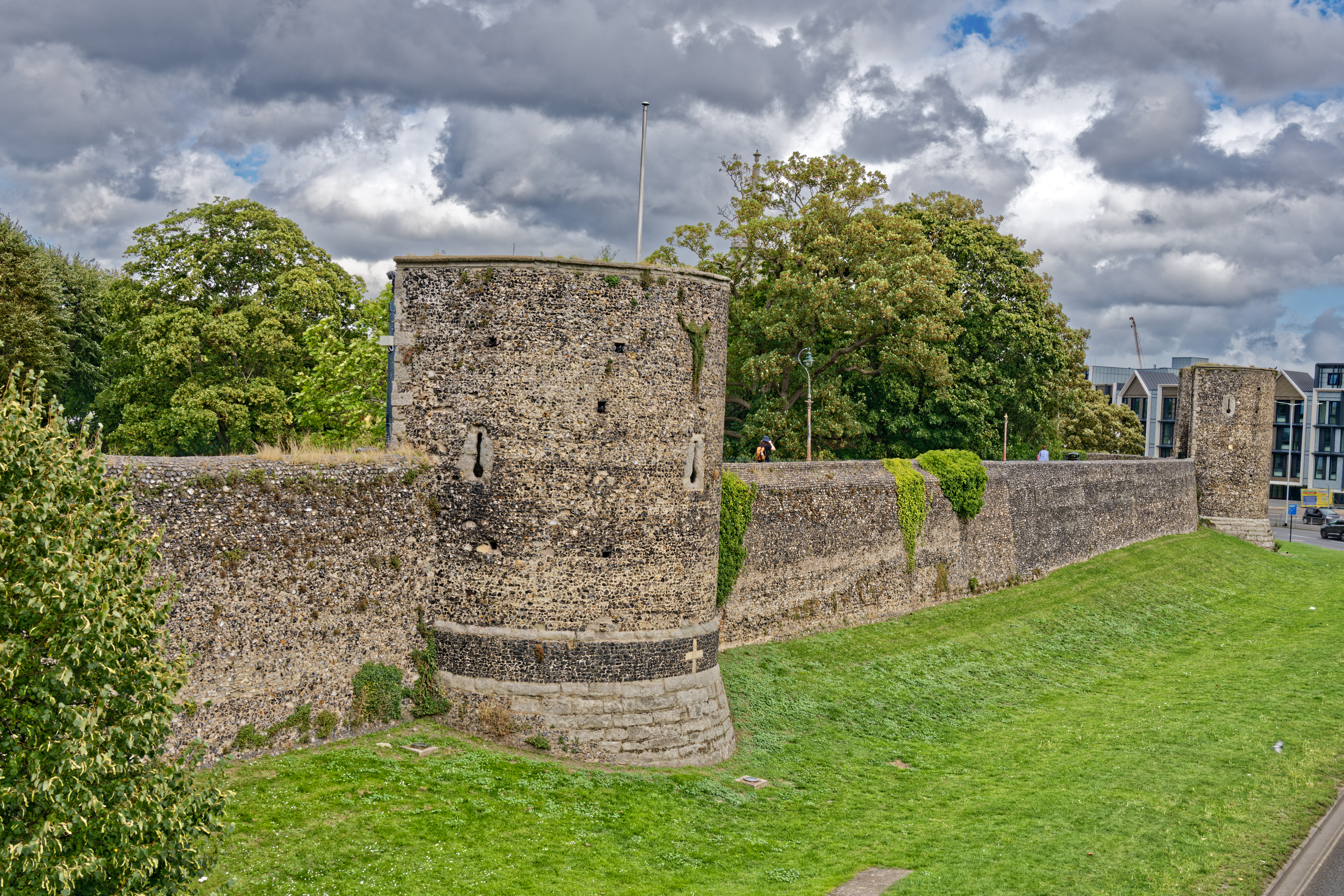
- Cathedral Castle St Martins Church Buttermarket City Walls

- Arms of Canterbury

- Location within Kent
- Population: 55,087 (2021)
- OS grid reference: TR145575
  - London: 54 miles (87 km)
- District: Canterbury
- Shire county: Kent
- Region: South East
- Country: England
- Sovereign state: United Kingdom
- Post town: CANTERBURY
- Postcode district: CT1, CT2, CT4
- Dialling code: 01227
- Police: Kent
- Fire: Kent
- Ambulance: South East Coast
- UK Parliament: Canterbury

Canterbury (/ˈkæntərbəri/ KAN-tər-bər-ee or /-bɛri/ -berr-ee) is a city and UNESCO World Heritage Site in the Canterbury district, county of Kent, England; it was a county borough until 1974. Lying on the River Stour not far from its mouth on the Strait of Dover, the city has a mild oceanic climate.

Canterbury is a popular tourist destination, with the city's economy heavily reliant upon tourism, alongside higher education and retail. As of 2021, the city had a population of 55,087 inhabitants, including a substantial number of students and one of the highest student-to-permanent-resident ratios in Britain.

The site of the city has been occupied since Paleolithic times and served as the capital of the Celtic Cantiaci and Jute Kingdom of Kent. Many historical structures fill the area, including a city wall founded in Roman times and rebuilt in the 14th century, the Westgate Towers museum, the ruins of St Augustine's Abbey, the Norman Canterbury Castle, and the oldest extant school in the world, the King's School. Modern additions include the Marlowe Theatre and Kent County Cricket Club's St Lawrence Ground. Canterbury Cathedral is known for its architecture, its music, and for being the seat of the Archbishop of Canterbury; it receives a million visitors per year.

== Toponymy ==
The Roman settlement of Durovernum Cantiacorum (" Durovernum of the Cantiaci") occupied the location of an earlier British town whose ancient British name has been reconstructed as *Durou̯ernon ("stronghold by the alder grove"), although the name is sometimes supposed to have derived from various British names for the Stour. Medieval variants of the Roman name include Dorobernia and Dorovernia. In Sub-Roman Britain, it was known in Old Welsh as Cair Ceint ("stronghold of Kent"). Occupied by the Jutes, it became known in Old English as Cantwareburh ("stronghold of the Kentish men").

== History ==
=== Early history ===
The Canterbury area has been inhabited since prehistoric times. Lower Paleolithic axes, and Neolithic and Bronze Age pots have been found in the area. Canterbury was first recorded as the main settlement of the Celtic tribe of the Cantiaci, which inhabited most of modern-day Kent. In the 1st century AD, the Romans captured the settlement and named it Durovernum Cantiacorum. The Romans rebuilt the city, with new streets in a grid pattern, a theatre, a temple, a forum, and public baths. Although they did not maintain a major military garrison, its position on Watling Street relative to the major Kentish ports of Rutupiae (Richborough), Dubrae (Dover), and Lemanae (Lymne) gave it considerable strategic importance. In the late 3rd century, to defend against attack from barbarians, the Romans built an earth bank around the city and a wall with seven gates, which enclosed an area of 130 acres (53 ha).

Despite being counted as one of the 28 cities of Sub-Roman Britain, it seems that after the Romans left Britain in 410 Durovernum Cantiacorum was abandoned for around 100 years, except by a few farmers and gradually decayed. Over the next 100 years, an Anglo-Saxon community formed within the city walls, as Jutish refugees arrived, possibly intermarrying with the locals. The town's new importance led to its revival, and trades developed in pottery, textiles, and leather. By 630, gold coins were being struck at the Canterbury mint. In 842 and 851, Canterbury suffered great loss of life during Danish raids.

=== 11th–16th centuries ===
The siege of Canterbury saw a large Viking army besiege Canterbury in 1011, culminating in the city being pillaged. Remembering the destruction caused by the Danes, the inhabitants of Canterbury did not resist William the Conqueror's invasion in 1066. William immediately ordered a wooden motte-and-bailey castle to be built by the Roman city wall. In the early 12th century, the castle was rebuilt with stone. Canterbury Castle was captured by the French Prince Louis during his 1215 invasion of England, before the death of John caused his English supporters to desert his cause and support the young Henry III.

Black Death reached Canterbury in 1348. At 10,000, Canterbury had the 10th largest population in England; by the early 16th century, the population had fallen to 3,000. In 1363, during the Hundred Years' War, a Commission of Inquiry found disrepair, stone-robbing and ditch-filling had led to the Roman wall becoming eroded. Between 1378 and 1402, the wall was virtually rebuilt, and new wall towers were added. In 1381, during Wat Tyler's Peasants' Revolt, the castle and Archbishop's Palace were sacked, and Archbishop Sudbury was beheaded in London. In 1413, Henry IV became the only sovereign to be buried at the cathedral. In 1448 Canterbury was granted a city charter, which gave it a mayor and a high sheriff; the city still has a Lord Mayor and Sheriff.

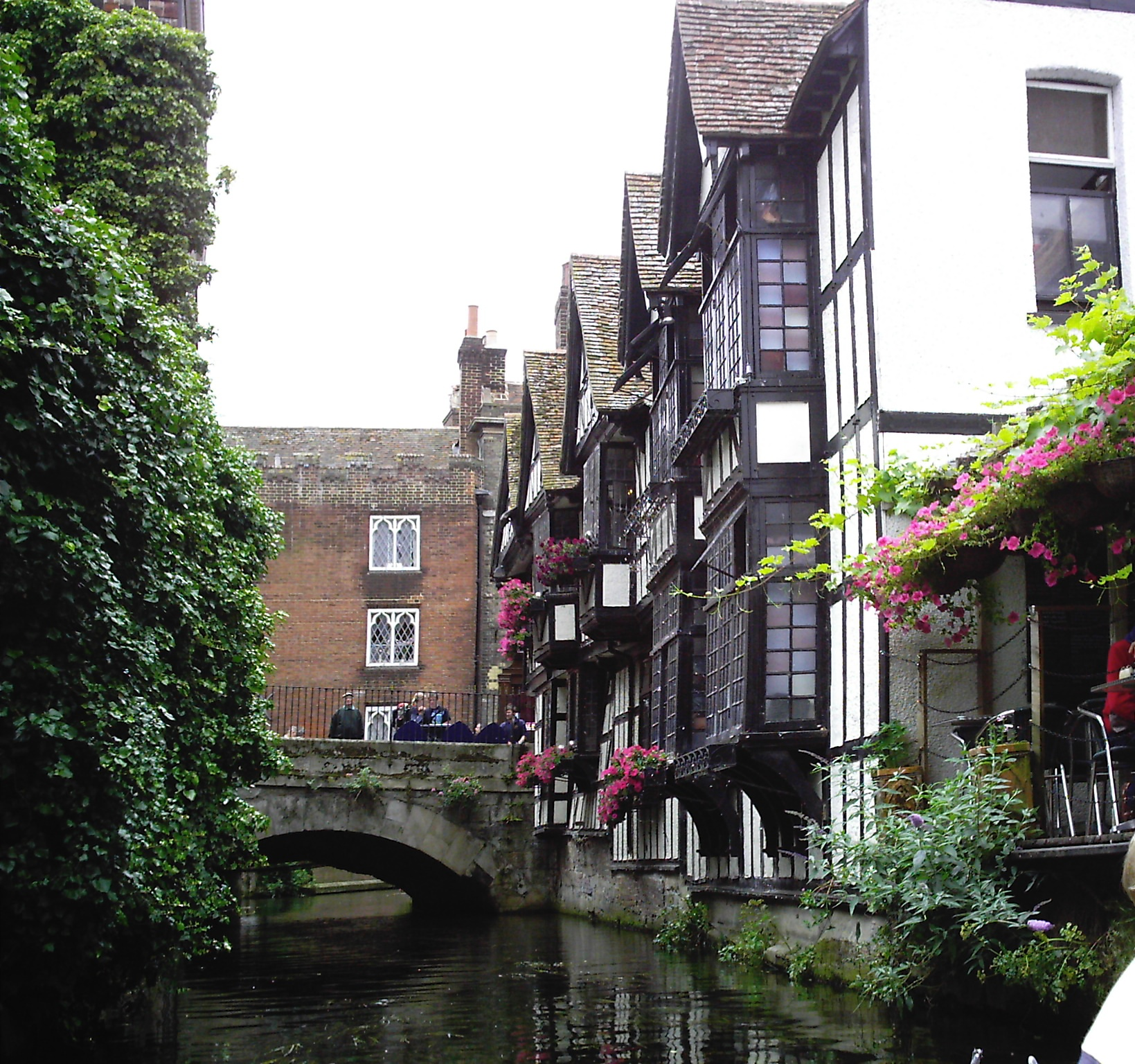
Huguenot weavers' houses near Canterbury High Street

In 1519 a public cage for talkative women and other wrongdoers was set up next to the town's pillory at the Bullstake, now the Buttermarket. In 1522 a stone cross with gilt lead stars was erected at the same place, and painted with bice and gilded by Florence the painter.

=== History of Huguenot refugees ===
In the mid-16th century many Huguenots, experiencing persecution and conflict in the Low Countries, fled and resettled in Reformed regions such as England. Canterbury hosted the first congregation of so-called 'refugee strangers' in the country. This first Huguenot church in Canterbury was founded around 1548, in part by Jan Utenhove who relocated from Strasbourg, alongside Valérand Poullain and François de la Rivière. When Utenhove travelled to London in 1549, Francois de la Rivière remained to lead the congregation. With the accession of Mary I, the Huguenot residents of Canterbury were compelled to flee in 1553–4 alongside the English Marian exiles to Emden, Wesel, Zürich, Strasbourg, Frankfurt, and later Basel, Geneva, and Aarau.

After the accession of Elizabeth I, a small number of Huguenots returned to London, including Jan Utenhove in 1559. In 1561, a number of Huguenots in London were sent to Sandwich, a settlement which began to grow rapidly with new refugees arriving from Artois and Flanders. This settlement, in June 1575, almost entirely relocated to Canterbury, which had in the previous year gained a small Huguenot population. A number of refugees also arrived around this time from the temporary Huguenot settlements at Rye and Winchelsea. In 1575, the Huguenot population of Canterbury were granted use of the church of St Alphedge but in the following year had begun to use the crypt of Canterbury Cathedral as their church. The Church of the Crypt swiftly became the nucleus of the Huguenot community in Canterbury.

By the 17th century, French-speaking Huguenots comprised two-fifths of Canterbury's population. The Huguenots had a large influence on the economy of Canterbury, and introduced silk weaving into the city which had outstripped wool weaving by 1676.

=== 17th century–present ===
Canterbury remained an important city in the 17th century. Charles I and Henrietta Maria visited in 1625; musicians played whilst the couple entered the city under a velvet canopy supported by six men holding poles. In 1647, during the English Civil War, riots broke out. The riots became known as the "Plum Pudding Riots". The rioters' trial the following year led to a Kent revolt against Parliamentarian forces, contributing to the start of the second phase of the war. However, Canterbury surrendered peacefully to Parliamentarians at the Battle of Maidstone.

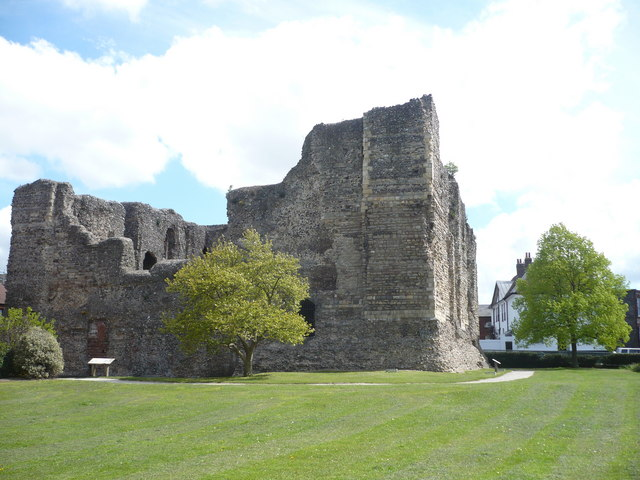
Canterbury Castle

By 1770, the castle had fallen into disrepair, and many parts of it were demolished during the late 18th century and early 19th century. In 1787 all the gates in the city wall, except for Westgate—the city jail—were demolished as a result of a commission that found them impeding to new coach travel. Canterbury Prison opened in 1808 just outside the city boundary. By 1820 the silk weaving in the city had been supplanted by imported Indian muslins and trade carried out was thereafter largely of hops and wheat. The Canterbury & Whitstable Railway (The Crab and Winkle Way), the world's first passenger railway, was opened in 1830; bankrupt by 1844, it was purchased by the South Eastern Railway, which connected the city to its larger network in 1846. The London, Chatham & Dover Railway arrived in 1860; the competition and cost-cutting between the lines was resolved by merging them as the South Eastern & Chatham in 1899. Between 1830 and 1900, the city's population grew from 15,000 to 24,000.

During the First World War, barracks and voluntary hospitals were set up around the city. In 1917 a German bomber crash-landed near Broad Oak Road. Mahatma Gandhi visited Canterbury in October 1931. During the Second World War, 10,445 bombs dropped during 135 separate raids destroyed 731 homes and 296 other buildings in the city, including the missionary college and Simon Langton Girls' Grammar School. 119 civilian people died through enemy action in the borough. The most devastating raid was on 1 June 1942 during the Baedeker Blitz. Before the end of the war, the architect Charles Holden drew up plans to redevelop the city centre, but locals were so opposed that the Citizens' Defence Association was formed; it swept to power in the 1945 municipal elections. Rebuilding of the city centre eventually began 10 years after the war. A ring road was constructed in stages outside the city walls to alleviate growing traffic problems in the city centre, which was later pedestrianised. The biggest expansion of the city occurred in the 1960s, with the arrival of the University of Kent at Canterbury and Christ Church College.

The 1980s saw visits from Queen Elizabeth II, and the beginning of the annual Canterbury Festival. Between 1999 and 2005, the Whitefriars Shopping Centre underwent major redevelopment. In 2000, during the redevelopment, a major archaeological project was undertaken by the Canterbury Archaeological Trust, known as the Big Dig, which was supported by Channel Four's Time Team.

== Geography ==
=== Climate ===
Canterbury experiences an oceanic climate (Köppen climate classification Cfb), similar to almost all of the United Kingdom. Canterbury enjoys mild temperatures all year round, being between 1.8 °C (35.2 °F) and 22.8 °C (73 °F). There is relatively little rainfall throughout the year.

Climate data for Canterbury
| Month | Jan | Feb | Mar | Apr | May | Jun | Jul | Aug | Sep | Oct | Nov | Dec | Year |
|---|---|---|---|---|---|---|---|---|---|---|---|---|---|
| Mean daily maximum °C (°F) | 7.6 (45.7) | 7.8 (46.0) | 10.7 (51.3) | 13.4 (56.1) | 16.8 (62.2) | 20.0 (68.0) | 22.8 (73.0) | 22.8 (73.0) | 19.4 (66.9) | 15.3 (59.5) | 10.9 (51.6) | 8.1 (46.6) | 14.7 (58.5) |
| Daily mean °C (°F) | 4.3 (39.7) | 4.3 (39.7) | 6.4 (43.5) | 8.2 (46.8) | 11.6 (52.9) | 14.3 (57.7) | 16.8 (62.2) | 16.9 (62.4) | 14.3 (57.7) | 10.9 (51.6) | 7.1 (44.8) | 5.3 (41.5) | 10.0 (50.0) |
| Mean daily minimum °C (°F) | 2.1 (35.8) | 1.8 (35.2) | 3.5 (38.3) | 4.9 (40.8) | 7.7 (45.9) | 10.5 (50.9) | 12.9 (55.2) | 12.8 (55.0) | 10.8 (51.4) | 8.0 (46.4) | 4.8 (40.6) | 2.5 (36.5) | 6.9 (44.4) |
| Average precipitation mm (inches) | 62.2 (2.45) | 42.2 (1.66) | 41.3 (1.63) | 42.9 (1.69) | 50.0 (1.97) | 39.0 (1.54) | 40.0 (1.57) | 51.2 (2.02) | 61.6 (2.43) | 83.2 (3.28) | 68.8 (2.71) | 63.4 (2.50) | 645.8 (25.43) |
| Mean monthly sunshine hours | 60.9 | 80.7 | 116.5 | 174.2 | 206.0 | 206.4 | 221.8 | 214.9 | 155.2 | 125.0 | 73.3 | 48.6 | 1,683.3 |
Source 1:
Source 2:

=== Demographics ===
The 2021 United Kingdom census showed a population of 55,087. Ethnically, the city was 78.3% white, 8.2% Asian, 5.9% Black, 4.4% Mixed, 1% Arab and 2.1% Other groups.

Canterbury compared
| 2001 UK Census | Canterbury city | Canterbury district | England |
|---|---|---|---|
| Total population | 43,432 | 135,278 | 49,138,831 |
| Foreign born | 11.6% | 5.1% | 9.2% |
| White | 95% | 97% | 91% |
| Asian | 1.8% | 1.6% | 4.6% |
| Black | 0.7% | 0.5% | 2.3% |
| Christian | 68% | 73% | 72% |
| Muslim | 1.1% | 0.6% | 3.1% |
| Hindu | 0.8% | 0.4% | 1.1% |
| No religion | 20% | 17% | 15% |
| Unemployed | 3.0% | 2.7% | 3.3% |

At the 2001 UK census, the total population of the city itself was 43,432, and 135,278 within the Canterbury district. In 2011, the total district population was counted as 151,200, with an 11.7% increase from 2001, and the population of the city had grown to over 55,000. By 2015, Canterbury's student population, including the University of Kent and Canterbury Christ Church University, and the smaller University for the Creative Arts, was almost 40,000. Canterbury's 2026 population is now estimated at 71,824.

Population growth in Canterbury since 1901
| Year | 1901 | 1911 | 1921 | 1931 | 1939 | 1951 | 1961 | 1971 | 2001 |
|---|---|---|---|---|---|---|---|---|---|
| Population | 24,899 | 24,626 | 23,737 | 24,446 | 26,999 | 27,795 | 30,415 | 33,155 | 43,432 |
Source: A Vision of Britain through Time

=== Physical ===
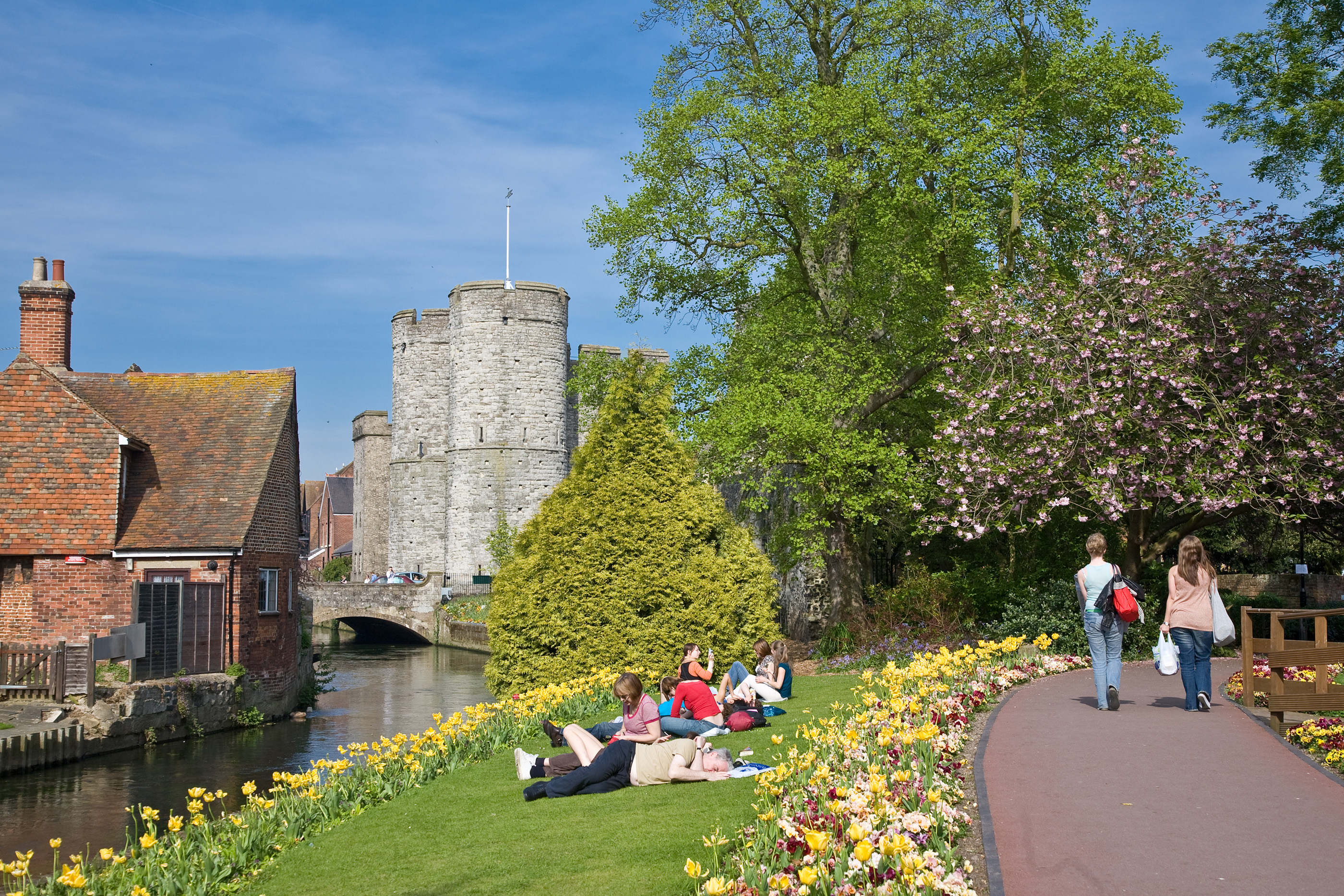
The River Great Stour

Canterbury is in east Kent, about 55 miles (89 km) east-southeast of London. The coastal towns of Herne Bay and Whitstable are 6 miles (10 km) to the north, and Faversham is 8 miles (13 km) to the northwest. The city is on the River Stour or Great Stour. The river is navigable on the tidal section to Fordwich, although above this point canoes and other small craft can be used. The geology of the area consists mainly of brickearth overlying chalk. Tertiary sands overlain by London clay form St. Thomas's Hill and St. Stephen's Hill about a mile northwest of the city centre.

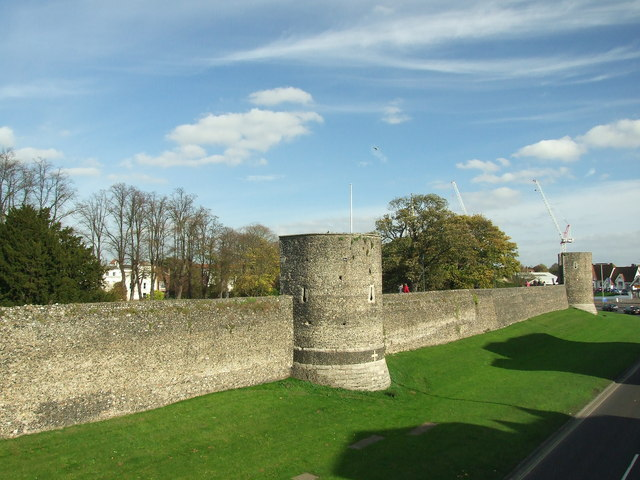
Canterbury city walls

Canterbury is a medieval city, with Canterbury Cathedral inside the ring of the city walls, forming the historic centre. Of the defensive structures, a section of the medieval walls remains to the south, near Canterbury Castle, while to the northwest, the Westgate survives as the Westgate Towers museum. Immediately outside the Westgate is the River Stour which crosses the city from southwest to northeast. A road runs straight across the city from the Westgate, forming the High Street (including St George's Street) and part of the North Downs Way. St Augustine's Abbey lies just outside the city walls.

=== Political ===
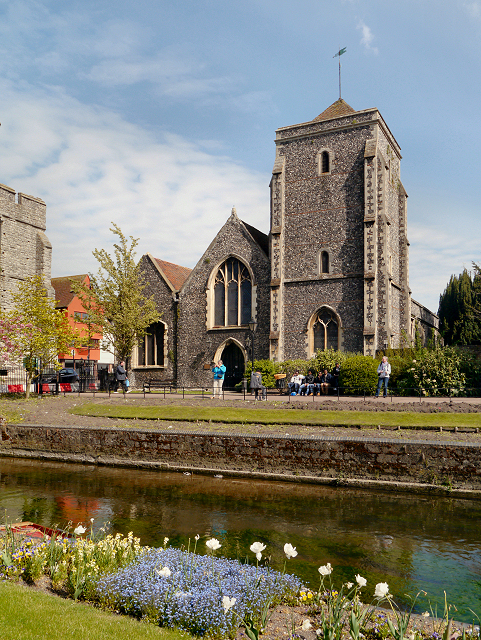
Canterbury Guildhall is housed in the former Holy Cross church building, on the River Stour. The Westgate is on the left of the image.

The city became a county borough under the Local Government Act 1888. In 1974, under the Local Government Act 1972, the city came under the control of Kent County Council. Canterbury, along with Whitstable and Herne Bay, is now in the City of Canterbury local government district. The city's urban area consists of the six electoral wards of Barton, Blean Forest, Northgate, St Stephens, Westgate, and Wincheap. These wards have eleven of the fifty seats on the Canterbury City Council, which governs the city.

The former Holy Cross Church building was officially re-opened by the Prince of Wales as the new Canterbury Guildhall and meeting place of the City Council on 9 November 1978.

The Member of Parliament for the Canterbury constituency, which includes Whitstable, is Rosie Duffield formerly of the Labour Party but now sits as an independent.

=== Economic ===
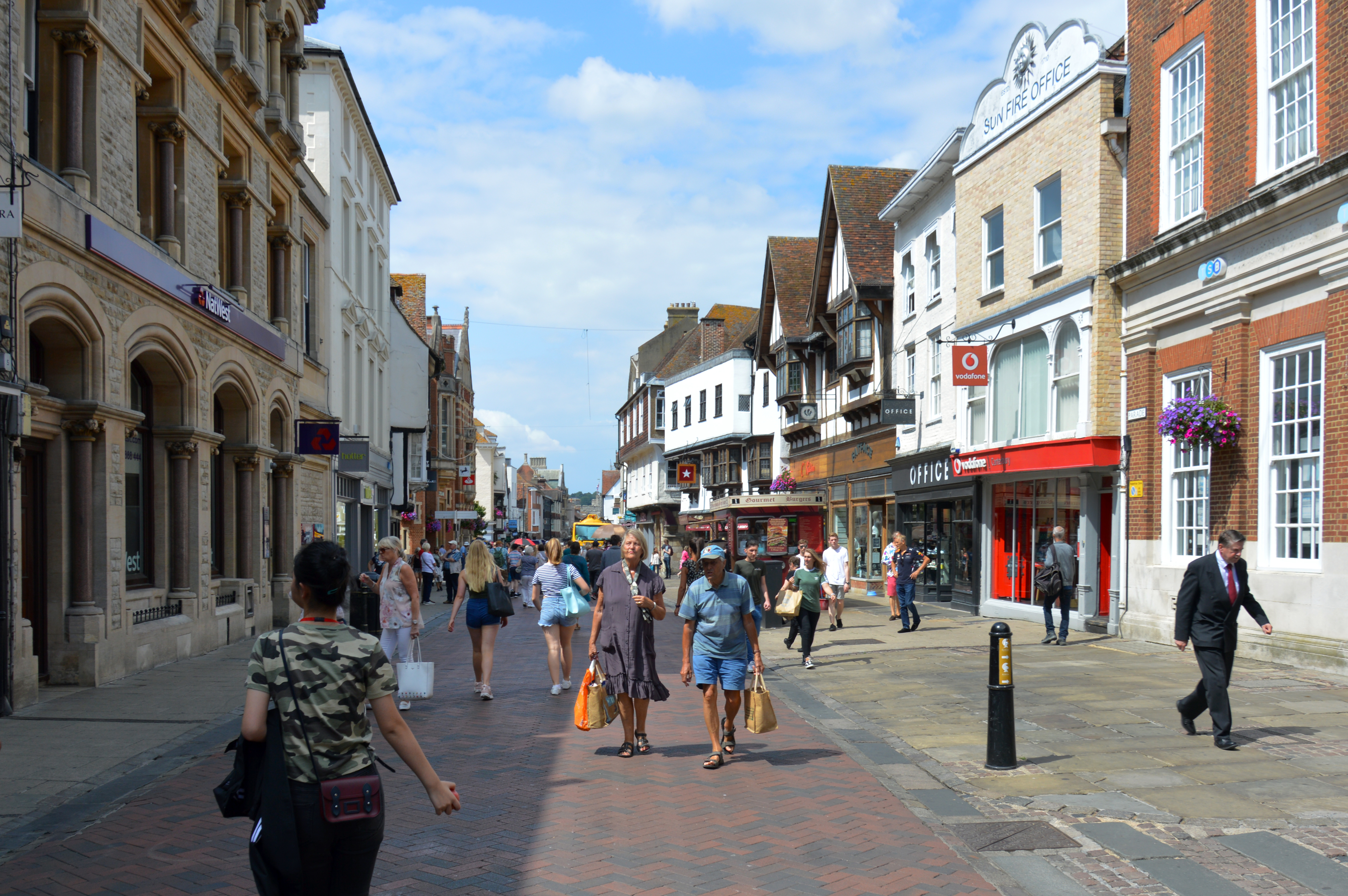
Shops on the High Street

Canterbury district retained approximately 4,761 businesses, up to 60,000 full and part-time employees and was worth £1.3 billion in 2001. This made the district the second largest economy in Kent. Today, the three primary sectors are tourism, higher education and retail.

In 2015, the value of tourism to the city of Canterbury was over £450 million; 7.2 million people visited that year, making it one of the most-visited cities in England. A full 9,378 jobs were supported by tourism, an increase of 6% over the previous year. The two universities provided an even greater benefit. In 2014/2015, the University of Kent and Canterbury Christ Church University were worth £909m to city's economy and accounted for 16% of all jobs.

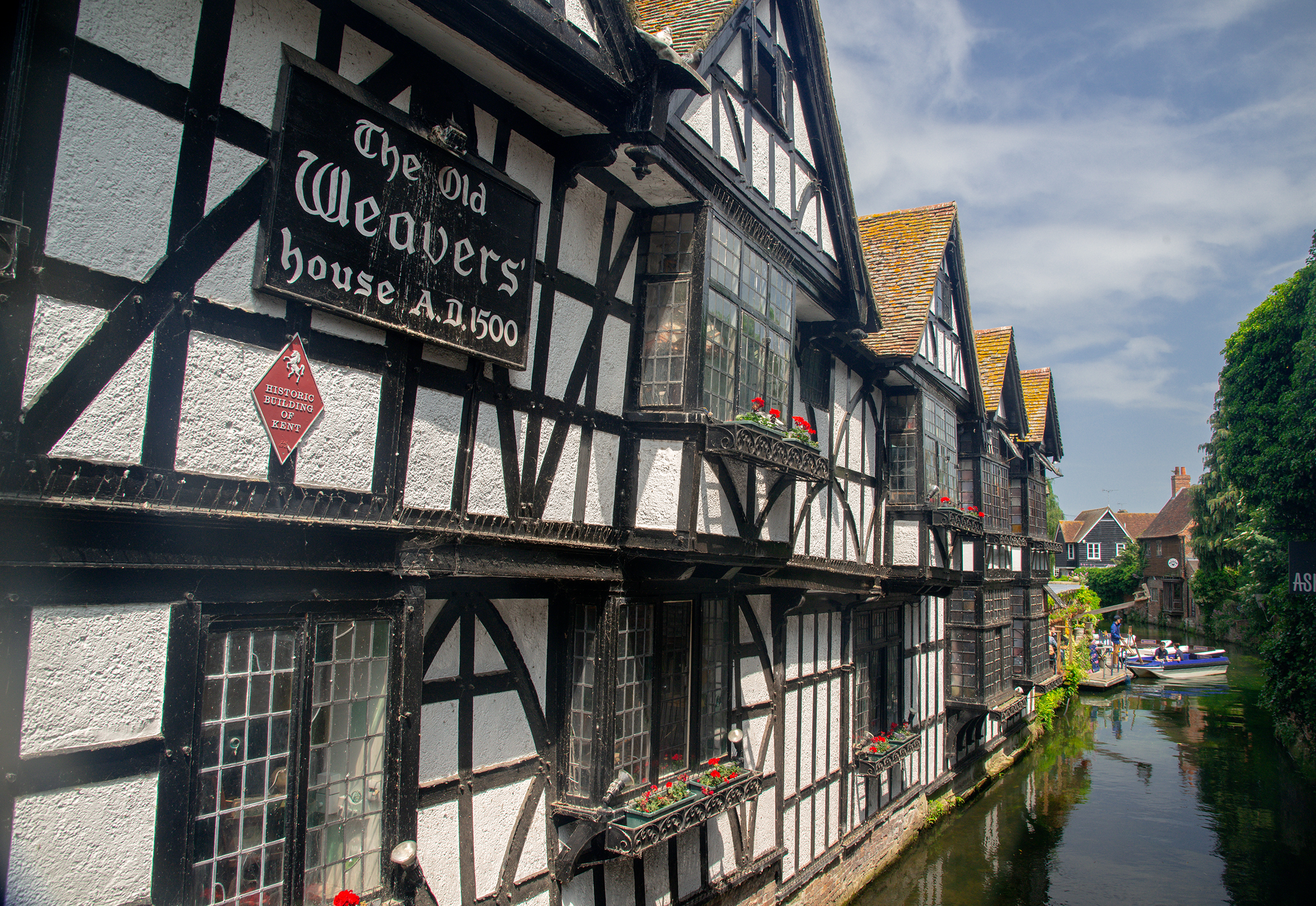
River punts provide tours of the city.

Unemployment in the city dropped 0.6 percentage points to 1.7% from 2001 to 2007. The registered unemployment rate as of September 2011 stood at 5.7%. By May 2018, the rate had dropped to 1.8%; in fact, Kent in general had a moderate unemployment rate of 2%. This data considers only people claiming either Jobseekers Allowance or Universal Credit principally for the reason of being unemployed. It does not include those without access to such benefits. At the time, the national rate was 4.2%.

A report in 2023 by the Poverty Working Group of the Canterbury Sustainable Development Goals Forum evidenced increasing poverty in the city using, for example, life expectancy figures and the number of meals provided by the city food banks, as well as interviews with organisations and individuals attempting to help those in danger of and in poverty. This supports earlier findings on poverty in the city.

== Culture ==
=== Landmarks ===
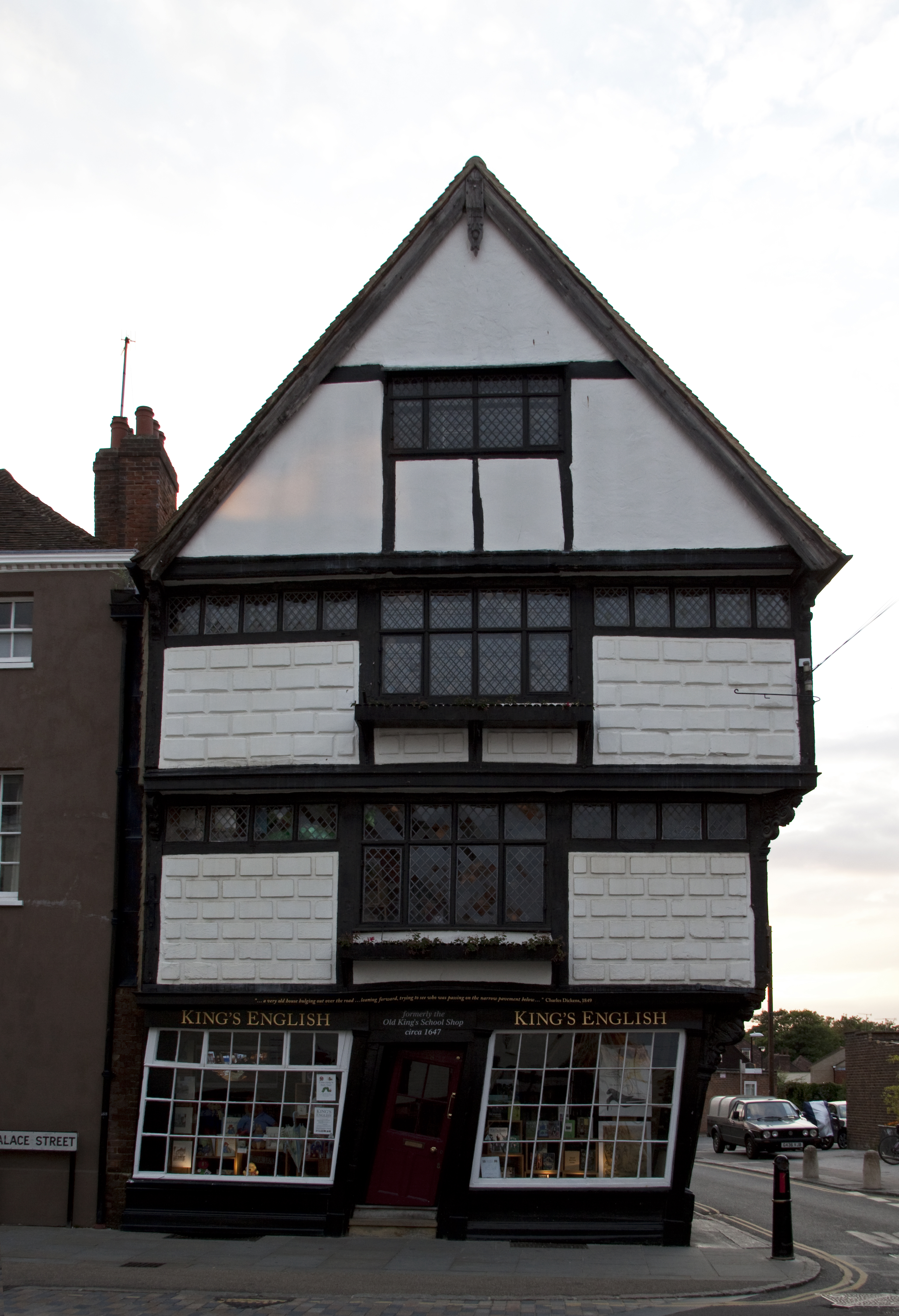
Crooked House, 2010

The 17th century, double jettied, half-timbered Crooked House bookshop operated by the Catching Lives homelessness charity at the end of Palace Street, opposite Kings School is frequently photographed for its quirky, slanted appearance. Canterbury Roman Museum houses an in situ mosaic pavement dating from around 300 AD. Other surviving Roman structures in the city include Queningate, a blocked gate in the city wall, and the Dane John Mound, once part of a Roman cemetery. The Dane John Gardens were built beside the mound in the 18th century, and a memorial placed on the mound's summit.

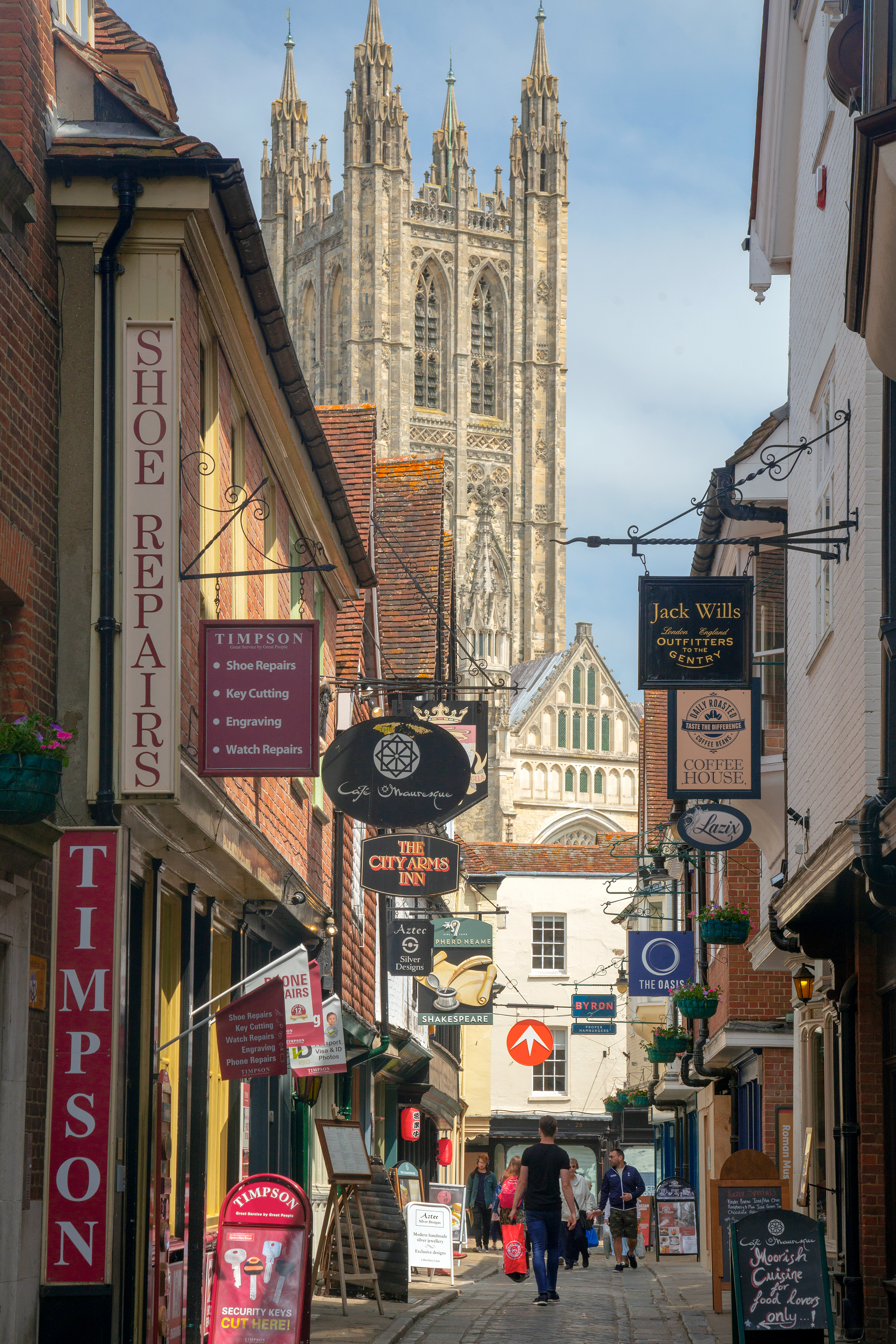
Butchery Lane

Westgate Towers is a museum narrating its earlier use as a jail. The medieval church of St Alphege is as of 2022 used by the King's School. The Old Synagogue, now the King's School Music Room, is one of only two Egyptian Revival synagogues still standing. The city centre contains many timber-framed 16th and 17th century houses but others were destroyed, particularly in the Second World War Baedeker Blitz. Survivors include the Huguenot "Old Weaver's House". St Martin's Mill is the only surviving mill out of the six known to have stood in Canterbury. It was built in 1817 and worked until 1890 but is now a residence.

=== Theatres ===
The Marlowe Theatre is named after Christopher Marlowe, who was born in the city. It was formerly located in St Margaret's Street but moved to the present location in 1984. It was completely rebuilt in 2011 with a main 1,200-seat auditorium and secondary performance space. Its modern structure is a landmark across the city. The University of Kent's Gulbenkian Theatre serves the city, and incorporates a cinema and café. Other theatrical performances take place at Canterbury Cathedral and St Augustine's Abbey. The oldest surviving theatre building in Canterbury is The Shakespeare bar which had been a playhouse in the Tudor period. Theatre companies in Canterbury include The Canterbury Players.

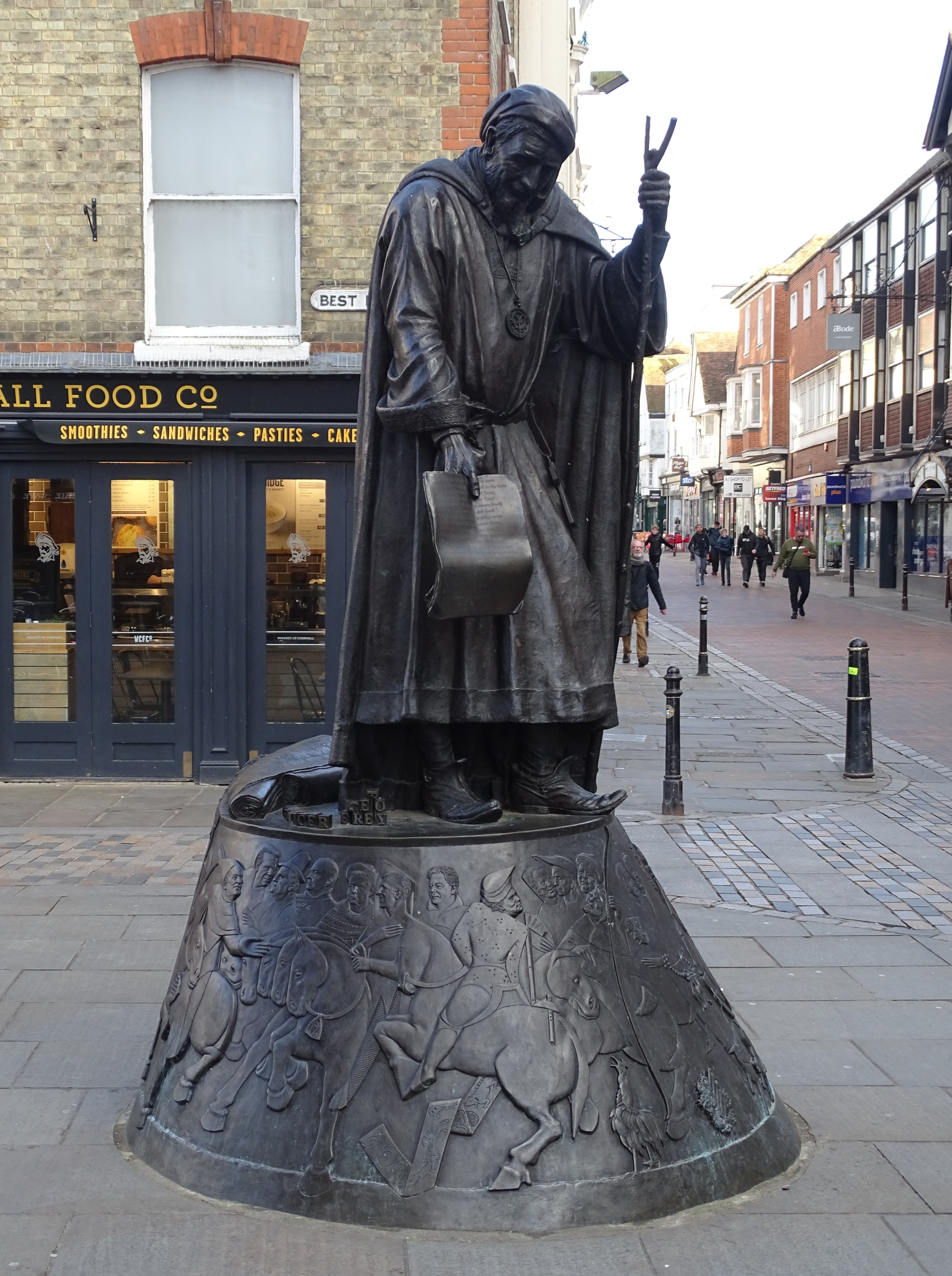
Statue of Geoffrey Chaucer, author of The Canterbury Tales

=== Music ===
In common with many English towns and cities in the Middle Ages, Canterbury employed a band of waits. There are records of payments to the waits from 1402, though they probably existed earlier. The waits were disbanded by the city authorities in 1641 for 'misdemeanors' but reinstated in 1660 when they played for the visit of King Charles II on his return from exile. Civic waits were ultimately abolished nationally by the Municipal Corporations Act 1835 but a modern, early music group called The Canterbury Waits has revived the name.

Canterbury's Catch Club was a musical and social club which met in the city between 1779 and 1865. Its male club members met weekly in the winter and employed an orchestra to assist in performances for the first half of their evening. After an interval, the members sang catches and glees from the club's extensive music library which is now deposited at Canterbury Cathedral's archives.

In the late 1960s and early 1970s the Canterbury Scene emerged comprising progressive rock, avant-garde and jazz musicians established within the city. Members included Soft Machine, Caravan, Matching Mole, Egg, Hatfield and the North, National Health, Gilgamesh, Soft Heap, Khan and In Cahoots. Ian Dury, front man of 1970s rock band Ian Dury and the Blockheads, taught Fine Art at Canterbury College of Art and early incarnations of his band Kilburn and the High Roads performed in the city. Canterbury Choral Society give regular concerts in Canterbury Cathedral, typically large-scale classical choral works. The Canterbury Orchestra, founded in 1953, perform major works from the symphonic repertoire. Other local musical groups include the Canterbury Singers, founded in 1953; Cantemus; and the City of Canterbury Chamber Choir.

The Canterbury Festival takes place over two weeks in October including musical events ranging from opera and symphony concerts to world music, jazz and folk. From 2006 to 2015 the July Lounge On The Farm music festival presented rock, indie and dance artists near Canterbury.

=== Sport ===
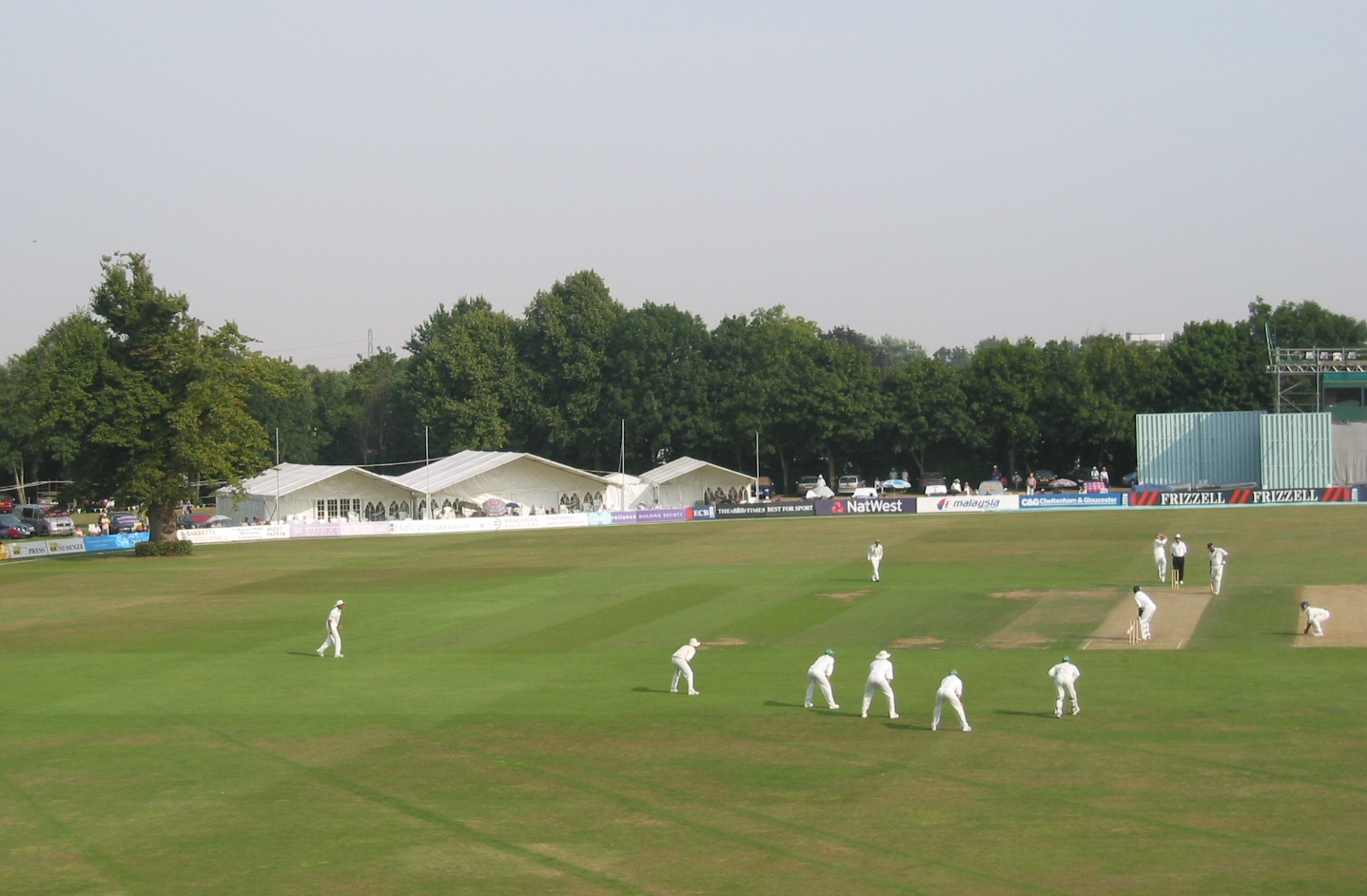
St Lawrence Ground

Cricket
Canterbury is the home of Kent County Cricket Club, with the St Lawrence Ground hosting many of the team's matches. It has also been used for several One Day Internationals, including an England match during the 1999 Cricket World Cup.

The St Lawrence Ground is notable for being one of only two grounds used regularly for first-class cricket that have had a tree within the boundary, the other being the City Oval in Pietermaritzburg.

American Football
There have been multiple American football teams based in Canterbury since the game was popularised in the UK. Currently, the city is the home of the East Kent Mavericks, 2023 BAFA National Leagues Southern Football Conference 2 Champions, as well as teams from both universities.

Football
Canterbury City F.C. reformed in 2007 as a community interest company and currently compete in the Southern Counties East Football League. The previous incarnation of the club folded in 2001.

Rugby
Canterbury RFC were founded in 1926 and became the first East Kent club to achieve National League status and currently play in the fourth tier, National League 2 South.

Tour de France
The cycling Tour de France passed through the city in 1994, and again in 2007 when it hosted the finish for Stage 1.

Hockey
Canterbury Hockey Club is one of the largest in the country; it enters teams in both the Men's and Women's England Hockey Leagues. Former Olympic gold medal winner Sean Kerly has been a member.

Public Facilities
Public sporting facilities are provided at Kingsmead Leisure Centre, including a 33-metre (108 ft) swimming pool and sports hall for football, basketball, and badminton.

== Education ==
=== Universities ===
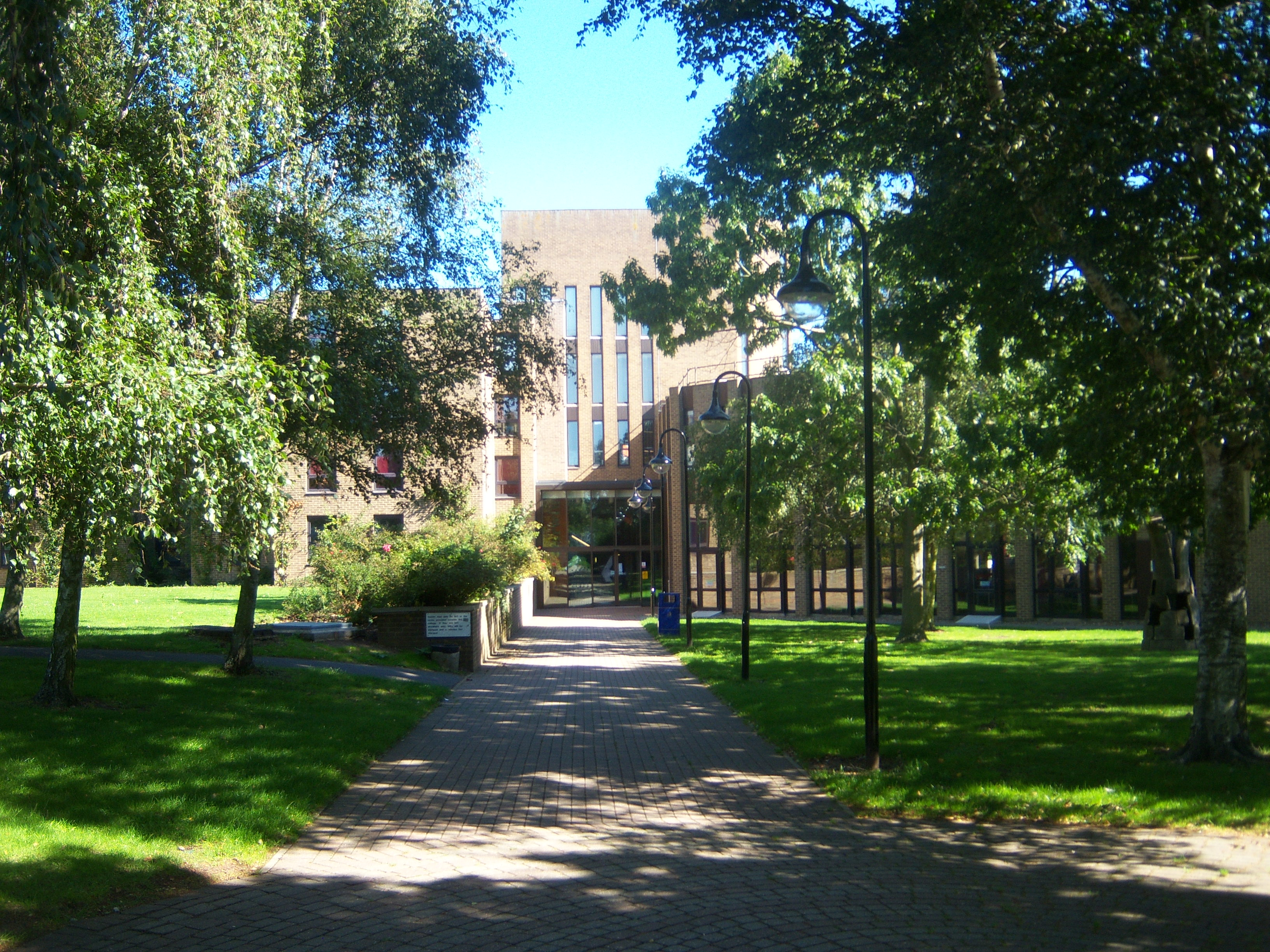
Darwin College, part of the University of Kent campus

Canterbury hosts some 31,000 students and has the highest student to permanent resident ratio in the UK. They attend three universities, and other higher education institutions. The University of Kent's main campus extends to 600 acres (243 ha) and is situated on Saint Stephen's Hill, a mile north of Canterbury city centre. In 2014, it enrolled around 20,000 students. Canterbury Christ Church University was founded as a teacher training college in 1962 by the Church of England; in 2005 it became a university. In 2024, it had around 30,000 students. The Franciscan International Study Centre is close to the University of Kent campus.

=== Schools ===
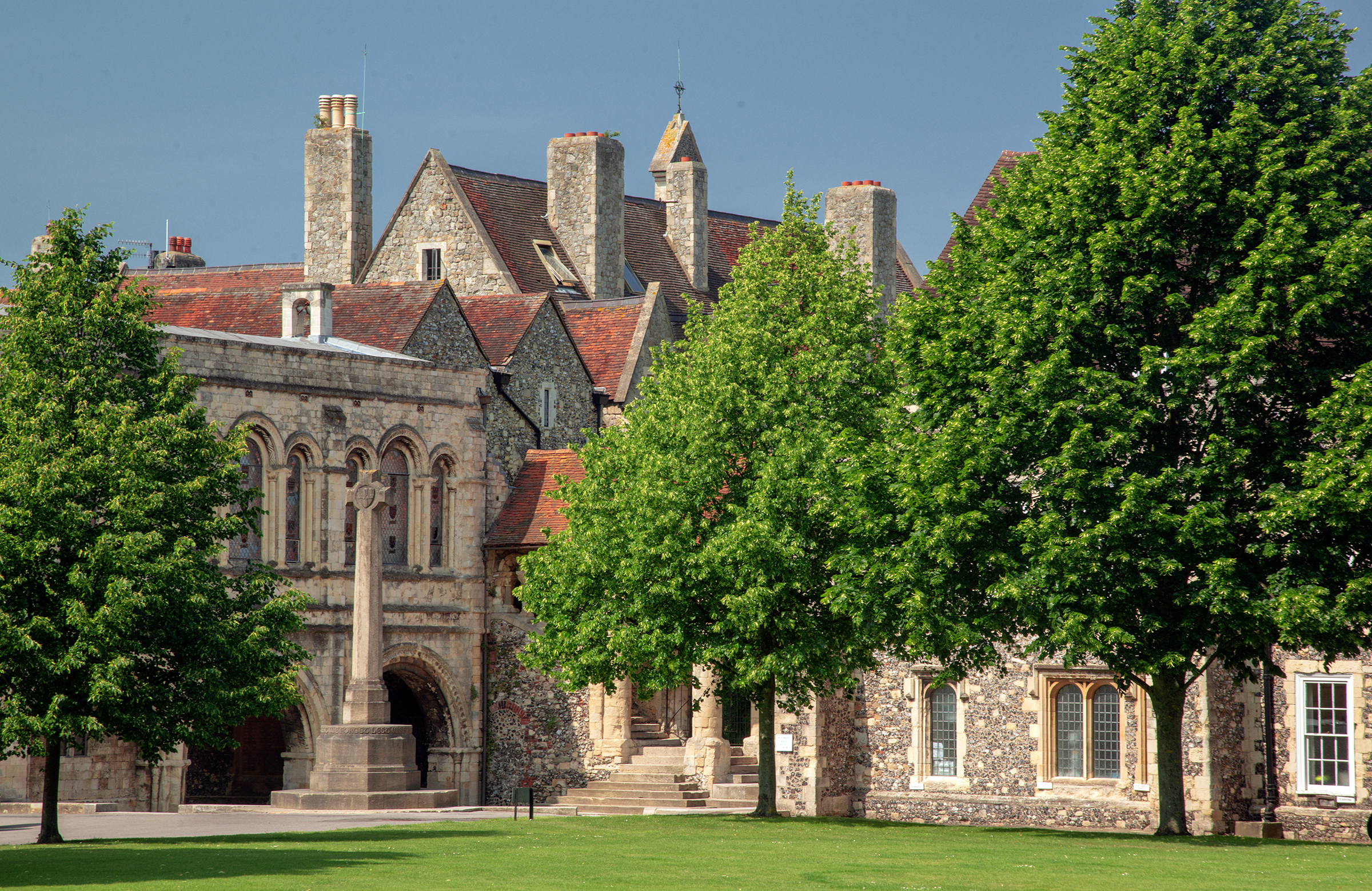
The King's School

King's School is the oldest secondary school in the United Kingdom. St. Augustine established it shortly after his 597 arrival in Canterbury though documented history of it only began after dissolution of the monasteries in the 16th century, when it took the present name in honour of Henry VIII.

The city's secondary grammar schools are Barton Court Grammar School, Simon Langton Grammar School for Boys and Simon Langton Girls' Grammar School, all of which in 2008 had over 93% of their pupils gain five or more GCSEs at grades A* to C including English and maths.

There are also non-selective secondary schools in Canterbury:

- Archbishop's School
- Barton Manor School
- The Canterbury Academy
- St Anselm's Catholic School
- Spires Academy

== Transport ==
=== Rail ===
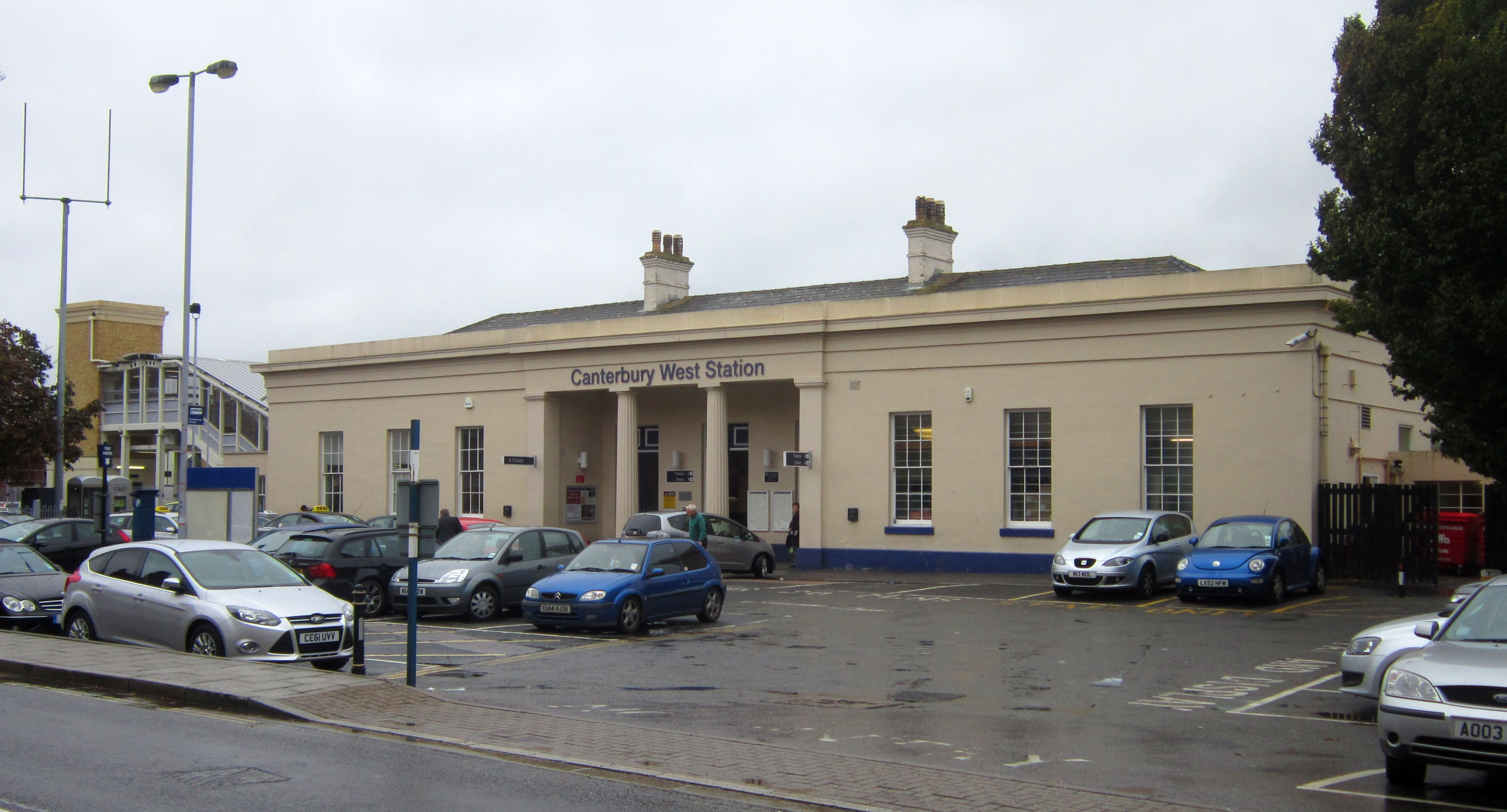
Canterbury West Railway Station

The pioneering Canterbury & Whitstable Railway, known locally as the Crab and Winkle line, had a terminus at North Lane station. It ran from 3 May 1830 to 1953 and was the first regular passenger steam railway in the world. Canterbury South railway station was sited on the Elham Valley Railway. The station opened in 1889 and closed, along with the rest of the railway, in 1947.

Canterbury West railway station is operated by Southeastern. Canterbury East railway station, (Canterbury's other station) is also operated by Southeastern. There is no direct interchange between Canterbury West and Canterbury East stations because the two railways into the city were built by rival companies. Canterbury Parkway railway station has been proposed as an additional station outside of the city, with links to both lines.

=== Bus ===
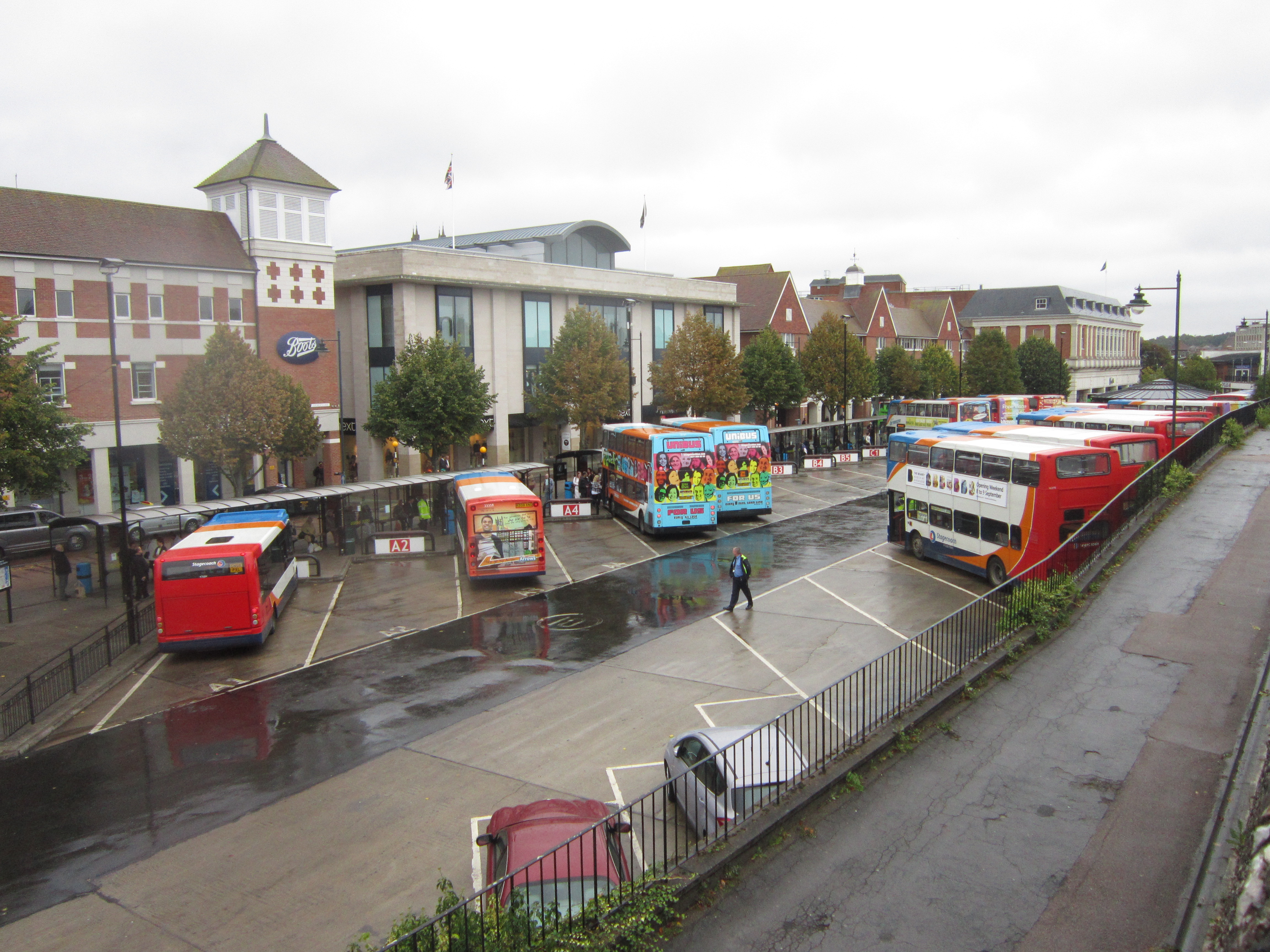
Canterbury bus station

Stagecoach South East run local bus routes in Canterbury, as well as long-distance services. Its bio fuel 'Unibus' service operates between the city centre and University of Kent. Canterbury has three operational park and ride sites at Wincheap and New Dover Road, intended for visitors arriving from the south by road, and at Sturry Road, intended for visitors arriving from the east by road.

National Express run coaches to Dover or London.

=== Cycling ===
National Cycle Route 1 runs through Canterbury from Dover and Sandwich to Whitstable. National Cycle Route 18 runs from Canterbury to Ashford.

== Local media ==
=== Newspapers ===
Canterbury's first newspaper was the Kentish Post, founded in 1717. It merged with newly founded Kentish Gazette in 1768 which is still being published, claiming to be the country's second oldest surviving newspaper. It is currently produced as a paid-for newspaper by KM Group in Whitstable with a 25,000 circulation across East Kent.

Three free weekly newspapers provide local news. The Daily Mail and General Trust's Canterbury Times has a circulation of 55,000. Similar circulation Canterbury Extra is owned by KM Group. yourcanterbury is published by KOS Media, which also prints Kent on Sunday.

=== Radio ===
Local radio stations are BBC Radio Kent on 104.2FM, Heart South on 102.8FM and KMFM Canterbury on 106FM. KMFM Canterbury was formerly KMFM106, and from foundation in 1997 until KM Group took control CTFM, a reference to Canterbury's CT postcode. KMFM's studio moved from the city to Ashford in 2008. Canterbury Hospital Radio serves Kent and Canterbury Hospital, and SBSLive's coverage is limited to the Simon Langton Boys School grounds.

From 2007 to 2020 Canterbury was also served by the country's first student led community radio station CSR 97.4FM. CSR means "Canterbury Student Radio" but it was a radio station catering to the students of the University of Kent and Canterbury Christ Church University, other educational establishments and the wider community being a collaboration of the two university's and broadcasting from studios at both. It replaced the student radio stations that served both university's being UKCR and C4 Radio respectively. In 2020 due to the COVID pandemic the station management decided to hand back the FM licence to OFCOM due to rising costs and has been broadcasting online since. There are plans for CSR to go on the recently awarded digital radio multiplex when it launches in the near future.

=== Television ===
Local news and television programmes are provided by BBC South East and ITV Meridian from the Dover TV transmitter.

== Notable people ==
Composer Orlando Gibbons (1583–1625) died in Canterbury and is commemorated by a marble bust and memorial tablet in the cathedral. The grave of author Joseph Conrad, in Canterbury Cemetery, is a Grade II listed building.

Other people connected with Canterbury include:

- Aphra Behn, restoration playwright and novelist
- Orlando Bloom, actor
- Thomas Sidney Cooper, painter
- Benjamin Chandler, 18th-century surgeon
- Robert Davies, Anglican priest, Archdeacon of Hobart
- Peter Duffell, film and television director and screenwriter
- David Gower, cricketer
- William Harvey, physician
- Joseph Jacobs, magician
- Sir Freddie Laker, airline entrepreneur
- Christopher Marlowe, poet and playwright
- W. Somerset Maugham, writer
- PinkPantheress, singer
- Joseph McManners, singer and actor
- Fiona Phillips, TV presenter
- Trevor Pinnock, harpsichordist and conductor
- Michael Powell, film director
- Edmund Reid, detective
- Mary Tourtel, creator of Rupert Bear,
- Mimi Webb, singer
- Goran Stefanovski, playwright
- Alec MacKelden, British Army officer and Military Cross recipient, educated at St. Dunstan's School

== International relations ==
Canterbury is twinned with the following cities:

- Reims, France
- Esztergom, Hungary
- Saint-Omer, France, since 1995
- Wimereux, France, since 1995
- Certaldo, Italy, since 1997
- Vladimir, Russia, since 1997
- Mölndal, Sweden, since 1997
- Tournai, Belgium, since 1999
- Bloomington, Illinois, United States

== Religion ==
In 597, Pope Gregory the Great sent Augustine to convert its King Æthelberht to Christianity. After the conversion, Canterbury, being a Roman town, was chosen by Augustine as the centre for his episcopal see in Kent, and an abbey and cathedral were built. Augustine thus became the first Archbishop of Canterbury. In 672, the Synod of Hertford gave the see of Canterbury authority over the entire English Church. In 978, Archbishop Dunstan refounded the abbey built by Augustine, and named it St Augustine's Abbey. In 1504 the cathedral's main tower, the Bell Harry Tower, was completed, ending 400 years of building. Cardinal Wolsey visited in June 1518 and was given a present of fruit, nuts, and marchpane. During the Dissolution of the Monasteries, the city's priory, nunnery and three friaries were closed. St Augustine's Abbey, the 14th richest in England at the time, was surrendered to the Crown, and its church and cloister were levelled. The rest of the abbey was dismantled over the next 15 years, although part of the site was converted to a palace.

After the murder of the Archbishop Thomas Becket at the cathedral in 1170, Canterbury became one of the most notable towns in Europe, as pilgrims from all parts of Christendom came to visit his shrine. This pilgrimage provided the framework for Geoffrey Chaucer's 14th-century collection of stories, The Canterbury Tales. Thomas Becket's shrine in the cathedral was demolished in 1538 by King Henry VIII, all the gold, silver, and jewels were removed to the Tower of London, and Becket's images, name and feasts were obliterated throughout the kingdom, ending the pilgrimages. In 1620, Robert Cushman negotiated the lease of the Mayflower at 59 Palace Street for the purpose of transporting the Pilgrims to America. In 1647, during the English Civil War, riots broke out when Canterbury's puritan mayor banned church services on Christmas Day. In 1848, St Augustine's Abbey was refurbished for use as a missionary college for the Church of England's representatives in the British colonies. The extensive restoration of the cathedral that was underway in mid 2018 was part of a 2016–2021 schedule that includes replacement of the nave roof, improved landscaping and accessibility, new visitor facilities and a general external restoration. The so-called Canterbury Journey project was expected to cost nearly £25 million.

Canterbury Cathedral is Mother Church of the Anglican Communion and seat of the Archbishop of Canterbury. Founded in 597 AD by Augustine, it forms a World Heritage Site, along with Saxon St. Martin's Church and the ruins of St Augustine's Abbey. The cathedral receives a million visitors annually and is one of the most visited places in the country. Services are held three or more times a day.

St Thomas of Canterbury Church is the only Roman Catholic church in the city and contains relics of Thomas Becket.

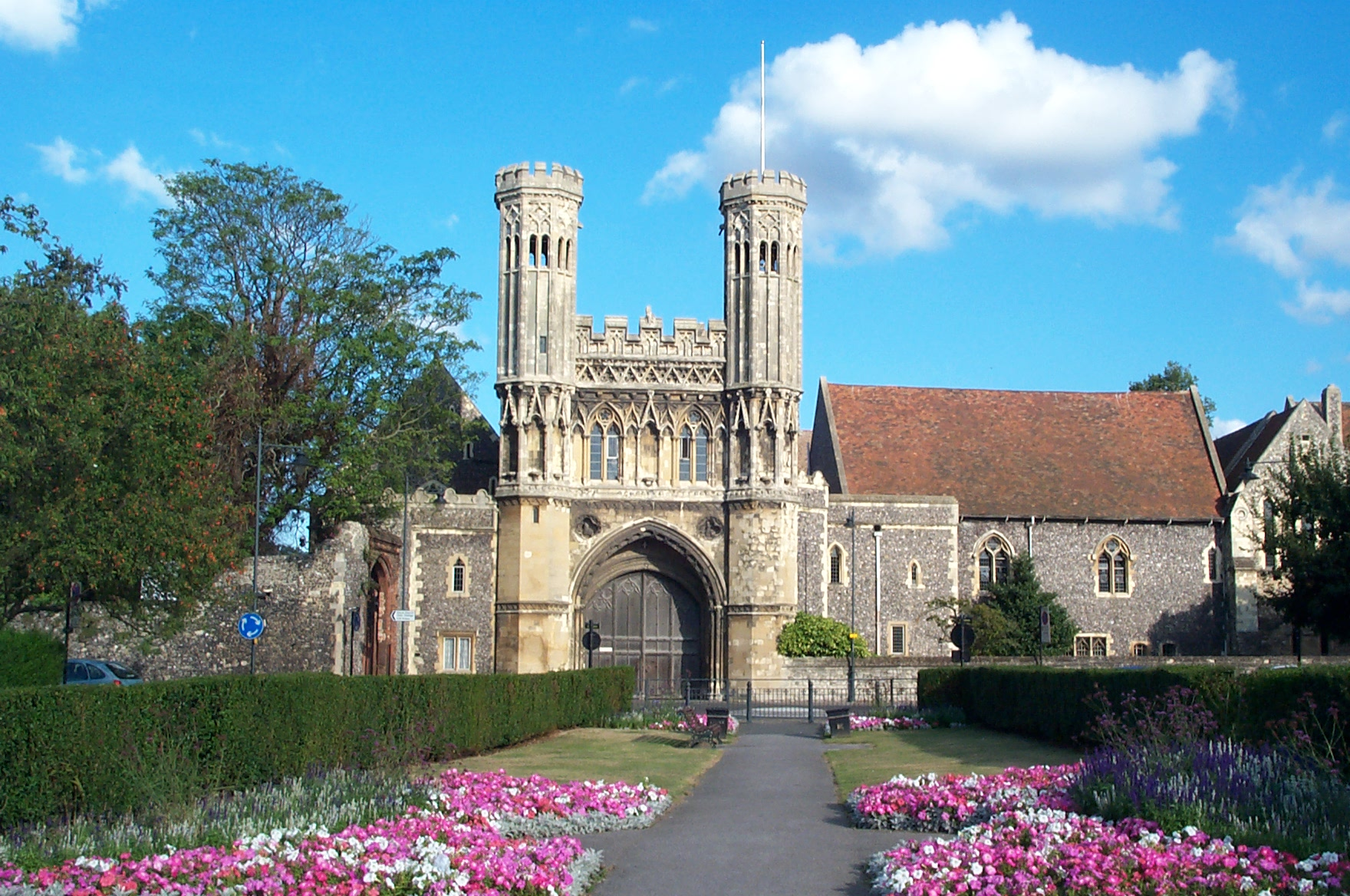
St. Augustine's Abbey gateway

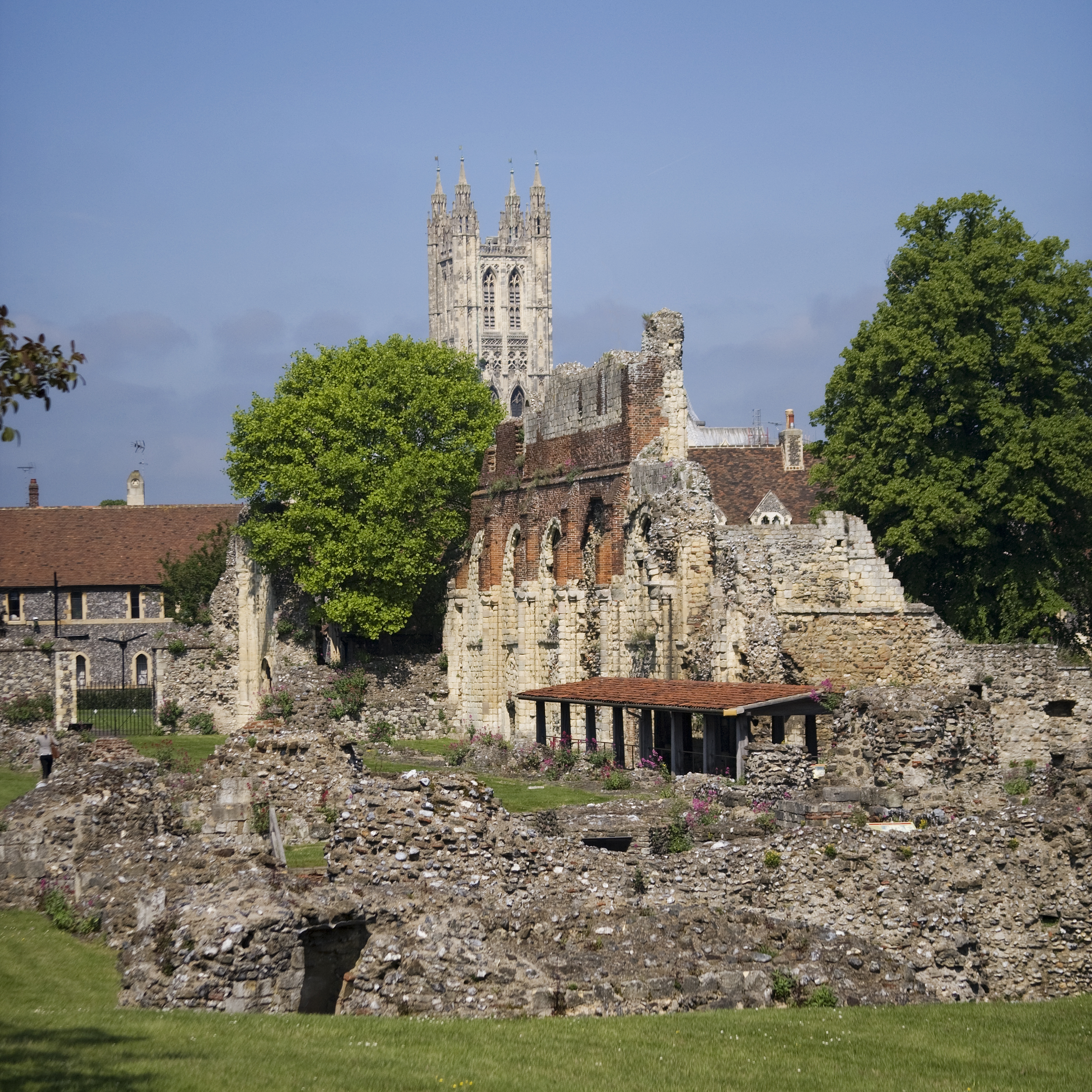
St. Augustine's Abbey

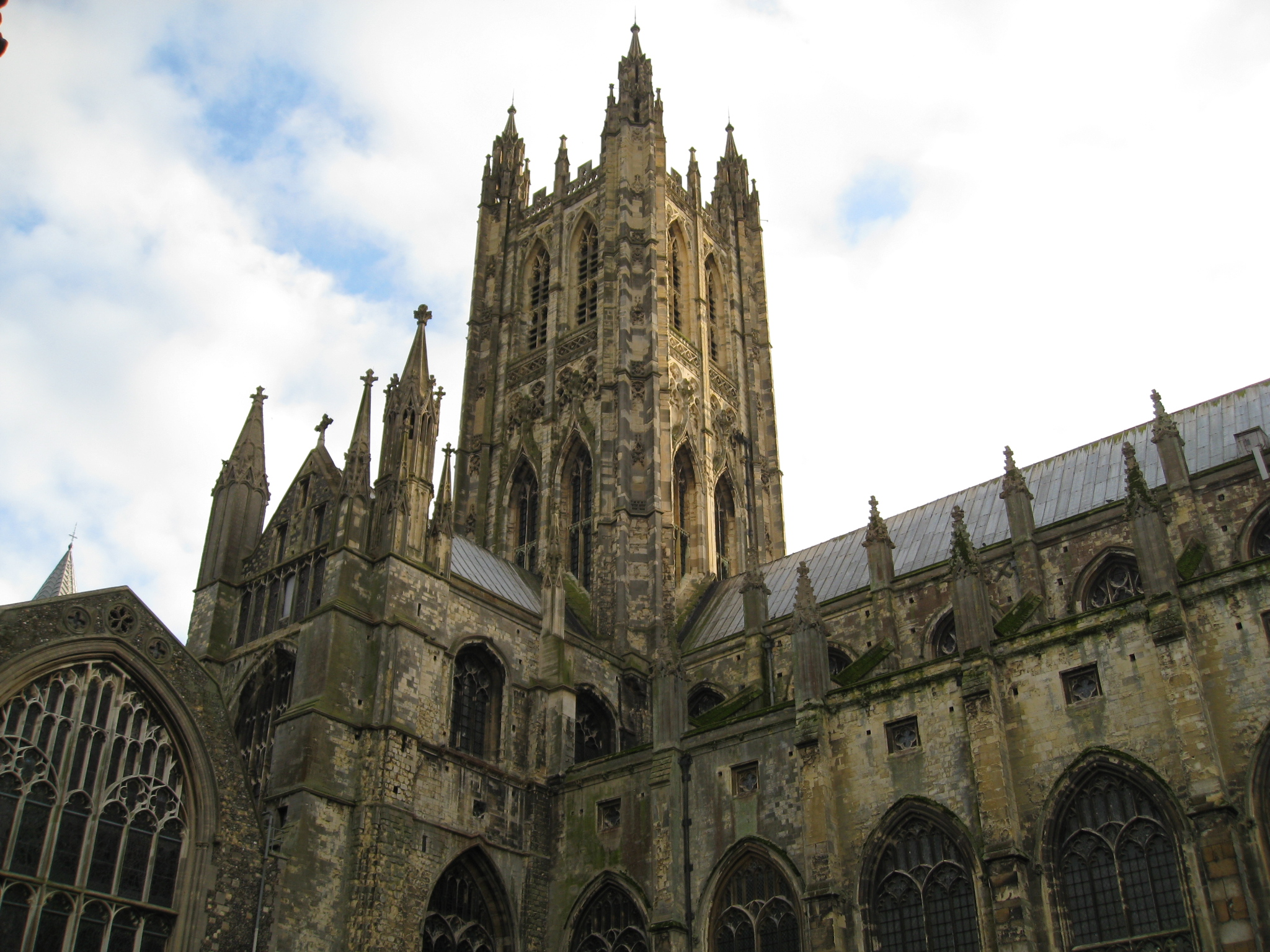
Canterbury Cathedral

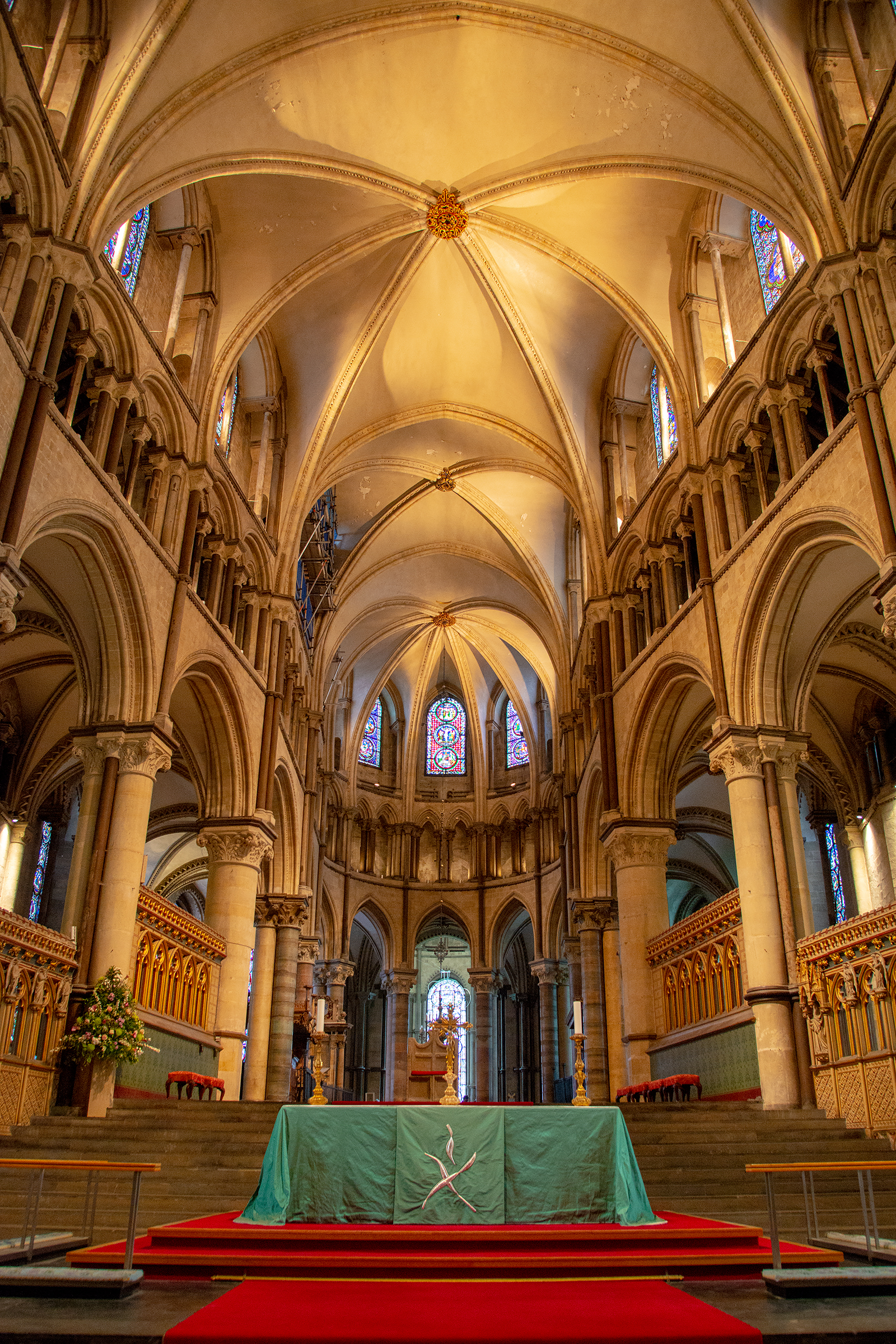
Canterbury Cathedral

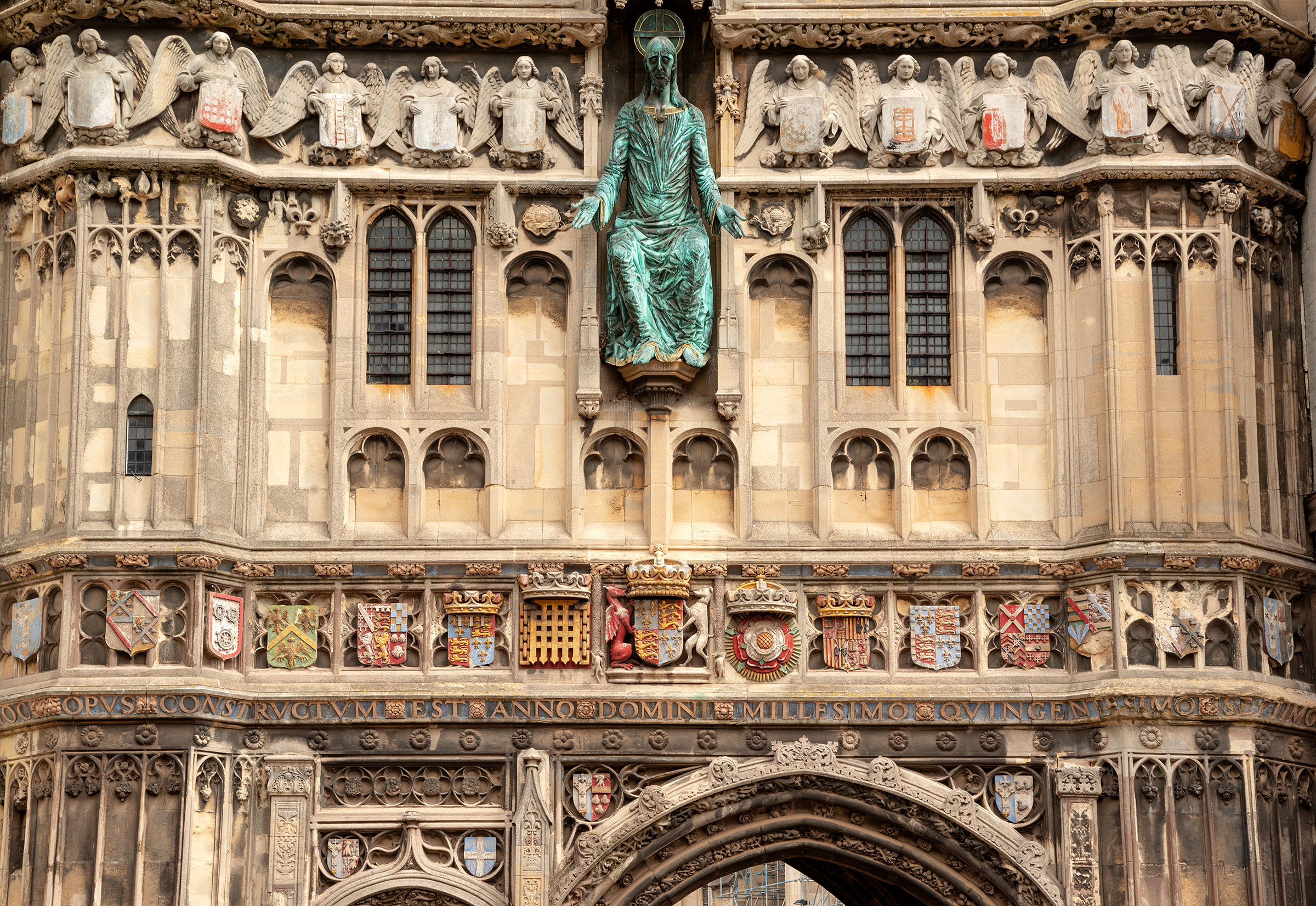
Christchurch Gate, Canterbury Cathedral

== In popular culture ==
Chaucer’s text became the inspiration for the 1944 British film, A Canterbury Tale by Michael Powell and Emeric Pressburger, starring Eric Portman, Sheila Sim, Dennis Price and Sgt. John Sweet, filmed in the city in the aftermath of the destruction caused by German bombing during World War Two.

In more recent popular culture, Canterbury appeared in Russell Hoban’s 1980 post apocalyptic novel Riddley Walker, renamed "Cambry". The English band Canterbury took this name from the place name.

== Sources ==
- Godfrey-Faussett, Thomas Godfrey (1878), "Canterbury (1.)" , in Baynes, T. S. (ed.), Encyclopædia Britannica, vol. 5 (9th ed.), New York: Charles Scribner's Sons, pp. 28–30
- Butler, Derek (2002), A Century of Canterbury, Sutton Publishing, ISBN 978-0-7509-3243-1
- Lyle, Marjorie (2002), Canterbury: 2000 Years of History, Tempus, ISBN 978-0-7524-1948-0
- Tellem, Geraint (2002), Canterbury and Kent, Jarrold Publishing, ISBN 978-0-7117-2079-4
