= François de la Rivière =

François de la Rivière may refer to:

- François Peruçel de la Rivière, 16th century French Protestant
- François Byssot de la Rivière (1612–1673), early figure in the New World
