= Joseph Jacobs (disambiguation) =

Joseph Jacobs (1854–1916) was a British-Jewish folklorist, literary critic and historian.

Joseph Jacobs may also refer to:

- Joseph Jacobs (magician) (1813–1870), English magician
- Joseph J. Jacobs (1916–2004), American chemical engineer
- Joseph E. Jacobs (1893–1971), US diplomat
- Josef Jacobs (1894–1978), German pilot
- Joey Jacobs (boxer, born 1960), British boxer
- Joey Jacobs Sr. (born 1937), his father, British boxer
- Joey Jacobs (footballer) (born 2000), Dutch footballer
- Joe Jacobs (American football) (born 1970), Arena Football league player
- Joe Jacobs (actor) (born 1983), English actor
- Joe Jacobs (speedway rider) (born 1993), British speedway rider
- Joe Jacobs (Emmerdale), in the UK TV soap opera Emmerdale, played by John Woodvine
- Josef Jakobs (1898–1941), German spy, last person executed in the Tower of London

== See also ==
- Joseph Jacob (disambiguation)
