= Robert Davies (priest) =

Robert Roland Davies (b Canterbury 15 September 1805- d Hobart 13 November 1880) was an Anglican priest in Australia.

Davies was educated at Trinity College, Dublin. He was ordained in 1828. His first post was a curacy at Kilbrin. In 1830 he arrived in Tasmania. In 1850 he came the Archdeacon of Launceston, Tasmania and in 1854 Archdeacon of Hobart.
