= Jacob Joseph (disambiguation) =

Jacob Joseph (1840–1902) was an American rabbi.

Jacob Joseph, or similar, may also refer to:

- Jacob Joseph (Malaysia football coach) (born 1958), football coach
- Yaakov Yosef Herman (1880–1967), Orthodox Jewish pioneer in the United States
- Ya'akov Yosef (1946–2013), Israeli rabbi

== See also ==
- Joseph Jacob (disambiguation)
- Rabbi Jacob Joseph School, in Staten Island, New York, U.S.
