= Benjamin Chandler =

English surgeon

- Born: 1737
- Died: 10 May 1786 (aged 48–49)
- Occupation: Surgeon

Benjamin Chandler (1737 – 10 May 1786) was an English surgeon.

== Biography ==
Chandler, who practised for many years at Canterbury, was admitted extra-licentiate of the London College of Physicians on 31 October 1783. He wrote "An Essay towards an Investigation of the resent successful and most general Methods of Inoculation" (1767), which was the earliest detailed account of the practice, and "An Enquiry into the various Theories and Methods of Cure in Apoplexies and Palsies" (1785), which is a criticism of William Cullen's two chapters on that subject, and a comparison of his views with those of others and the results of his own experience.

He died on 10 May 1786, and was buried in the church of St Mary Magdalene in Canterbury.
