= Valérand Poullain =

French minister

Valérand Poullain (Pollanus, Pullanus) (1509?–1557) was a French Calvinist minister. In a troubled career as minister, he was pastor to a congregation of Flemish or Walloon weavers brought to Southwest England around 1548.

== Life ==
Poullain was originally from Lille. He was willing to replace the martyred Pierre Brully at the Strasburg church, in 1544–1545. But there was local opposition from other local reformers, who found him unreasonable, notably Johannes Sturm. Poullain failed to gain the position from a short list of five, all of whom were required to preach in front of a committee including Sturm, Immanuel Tremellius, and Peter Martyr, supported by Martin Bucer and others. He shortly left the city for a teaching position at Romberg, being succeeded as pastor by Pierre Alexandre and then shortly by Jean Garnier.

Poullain owed his invitation to England to Jan Utenhove. He was in Canterbury, working with a French refugee congregation, around 1547. In doing so, he became part of the first congregation of Huguenots in England. The weavers he brought occupied the building of the dissolved Glastonbury Abbey from 1551 to 1554, initially under the auspices of Lord Protector Somerset, and using a Protestant liturgy of Poullain's devising. Poullain was probably an influence on the liturgy in the Book of Common Prayer of Edward VI. After the accession of Mary I of England Poullain left England with some 24 of his weavers, going to Wesel, and then Frankfurt. He became acquainted with John Foxe there; but a move to Basel led to his appearance before a matrimonial court in a case concerning his disputed betrothal.

Later, in 1556, Poullain was in charge of a quarrelsome French refugee congregation at Frankfurt. Jean Calvin himself had to intervene: Poullain was cleared of allegations against him, but had to resign his position, and Calvin questioned his judgement.
