= St Martin's Mill, Canterbury =

Windmill in Canterbury, Kent, England

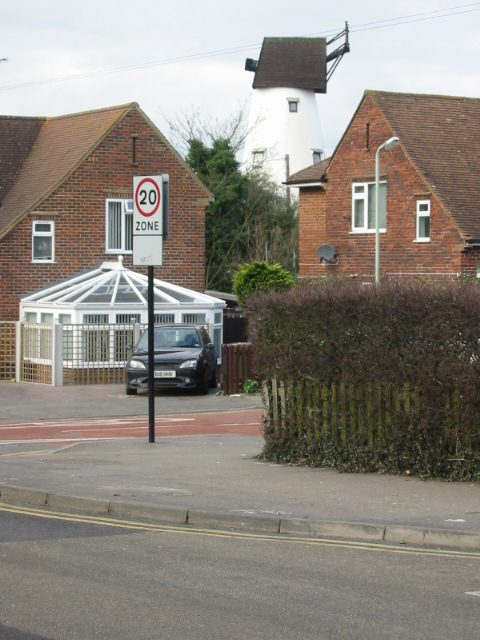

Origin
- Mill location: Windmill Close, Canterbury
- Grid reference: TR 165 578
- Coordinates: 51°16′42″N 1°5′48″E
- Year built: 1817

Information
- Purpose: Corn mill
- Type: Tower mill
- Storeys: Four storeys
- No. of sails: Four
- Type of sails: Patent sails
- Windshaft: Cast iron
- Winding: Fantail
- Fantail blades: Six blades
- No. of pairs of millstones: Three pairs

St Martin's Mill is a Grade II listed converted tower mill in Canterbury, Kent, England.

== History ==
St Martin's Mill was built in 1817 by John Adams. It was working until 1890 and was converted into a house by a Mr Couzens in 1920. There was a proposal to demolish the building in April 1958, but a preservation order was placed on the windmill by the Ministry of Housing and Local Government. The mill lost its sails in the great storm of 1987 and they have not been replaced.

== Description ==
St Martins Mill is a four-storey brick tower mill, rendered with cement. It had a Kentish-style cap, four single patent sails and was winded by a fantail. There was a stage at first-floor level. The windshaft is of cast iron. The brake wheel and wallower survive, as does the drive to the sack hoist. The mill drove three pairs of stones.

== Millers ==
- Samuel Beard 1839
- Thomas Marsh 1839, 1849
- William Cannon 1845
- M Gooderson 1859 – 1862
- J Durrant 1862
- Richardson
- Bradley
- Robinson
- Bax
- Coaks
- Rackham
- Lawrence

References for above:-
