= Joseph Jacob =

Joseph Jacob may refer to:

- Joseph Jacob (cellist), Belgian musician
- Joe Jacob, Irish politician

== See also ==
- Jacob Joseph (disambiguation)
- Joseph Jacobs (disambiguation)
