= Canterbury Park and Ride =

Park and ride system in England

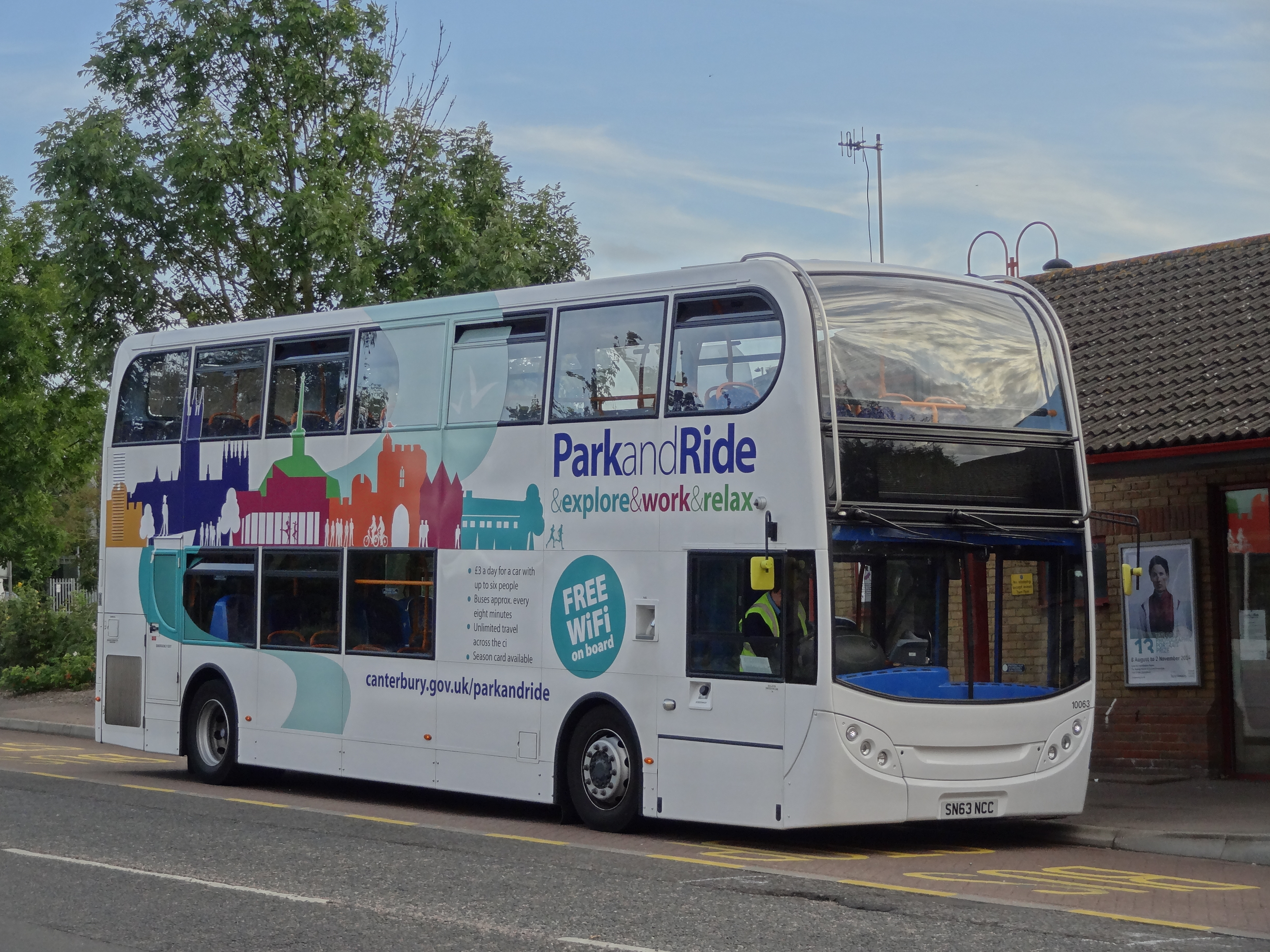

General information
- Location: Canterbury; Canterbury
- Operator: Stagecoach South East (with funding from Canterbury City Council)
- Connections: Canterbury East railway station, Canterbury Bus Station

Other information
- Website: https://www.canterbury.gov.uk/parking-and-roads/park-and-ride

Canterbury Park and Ride is a park and ride system operated by Stagecoach South East in the English historic cathedral city of Canterbury. It was designed to reduce pollution in the city centre.

== History ==
The Park and Ride scheme was launched in 1991. Initially, it was operated by the East Kent Road Car Company using three single-deck vehicles. The company was subsequently taken over by the Stagecoach Group in 1993. The service was then managed by Stagecoach until 2008 when it was transferred to the council-owned operator Kent Top Travel. In the summer of 2013, after the expiration of the five-year contract with Kent Top Travel, the service returned to Stagecoach operation. Stagecoach proposed improvements to the Park & Ride scheme, including free Wi-Fi, extended operating hours, and the use of a new fleet of environmentally friendly buses.

== Operation ==
Wincheap, Sturry Road and New Dover Road Park & Ride routes operate every 10 minutes.

The initial Stagecoach operation consisted of ALX200 and ALX400 buses in a silver and purple livery. Under Kent Top Travel ownership, a fleet of Volvo B9TL/Optare Olympus and Volvo B7RLE/Optare Esteem buses in a Lime and Silver "Love your city" branded livery. The previous Stagecoach fleet consisted of Enviro 300, Enviro 400 and Optare Solo SR buses in a branded white livery.

The current Stagecoach fleet used on all three routes consists of Enviro200 MMC and Enviro400 MMC buses in a predominantly white and purple Canterbury City Council Park & Ride livery.

== Routes ==
The scheme currently has three routes with each running to Canterbury Bus Station in the city centre.

The potential for further sites at Thanington, Cockering Farm and Harbledown were studied by the city council in 2009, but none were proceeded with.

The latest iteration of the council's local plan and transport strategy includes the relocation of the New Dover Road Park & Ride site as well as an additional site at Merton Lane and provision for a 'park and bus' site along the Old Thanet Way in Whitstable.

=== Sturry Road Park & Ride ===
This route runs from Sturry Road Park & Ride terminus along the A28/Sturry Road to Canterbury Bus Station, passing the Magistrates Court, City Wall and ASDA.

The site was mothballed by the council's previous Conservative administration but following manifesto promises by the Labour and Liberal Democrat parties to reopen the Sturry Road site ahead of the 2023 local elections, services restarted on 1 April 2024.

=== Wincheap Park & Ride ===
This route runs from Wincheap Park & Ride terminus through the Wincheap Industrial Estate, past Pin Hill bus stop and the connection to the Chatham Main Line at Canterbury East, before ending at Canterbury Bus Station.

=== New Dover Road Park & Ride ===
This route runs from New Dover Road Park & Ride terminus along Old Dover Road to Canterbury Bus Station, passing Canterbury Health Centre and returns via Old Dover Road and Canterbury College.
