= Joseph Jacobs (magician) =

- Born: c. 1813; Canterbury, Kent, United Kingdom
- Died: 13 October 1870 (aged 57)
- Other names: The Wizard Jacobs; Jacobs the Wizard; The Great Jacobs
- Occupation: Entertainer

Joseph Jacobs (c. 1813 – 13 October 1870), also known by the stage names The Wizard Jacobs, Jacobs the Wizard, and The Great Jacobs, was an English magician, improvisatore, and ventriloquist.

== Biography ==
Jacobs was born to a Jewish family in Canterbury, Kent. He appeared on stage at an early age, visiting Dover, Brighton, Bath, and other provincial towns during the summer and autumn of 1834. He first appeared in London at Horn's Tavern, Kennington, in 1835, where he performed the Chinese ring trick. Four years later he had the honour of performing before the Princess Augusta at Brighton.

At the Strand Theatre in 1841, he made a great show of expensive apparatus in imitation of J. H. Anderson. He performed in 1846 the trick of turning ink into transparent water in which goldfish swam, and in 1850 he introduced the trick of producing from under a shawl bowls of water containing goldfish, afterwards throwing the shawl on the floor, and then, on raising it again, disclosing live ducks or rabbits.

He appeared at the Adelaide Gallery in 1853, in America in 1854, and in 1860 in Australia and New Zealand. In 1860 he also opened the Polygraphic Hall in London.
