= Jan Utenhove =

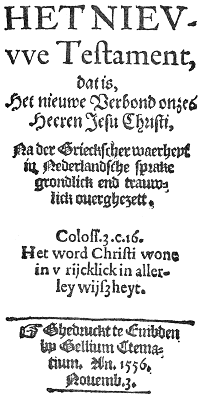
A photo of the New Testament-The New Covenant of our Lord.Emden, Gellius Clemasius (Gilles van der Erven)1556.

Jan Utenhove (Ghent or Roborst, 1516 – London, January 6, 1566) was a writer from the Low Countries best known for his translations into the Dutch language of the Psalms and the New Testament.

== Life ==
Utenhove was born into a Flemish patrician family in Ghent; he belonged to the Van der Gracht branch. His relation Karel Utenhove, who worked as an amanuensis to Erasmus, was from another branch (Van Markegen). He was acquainted with John Laski, with whom Karel had travelled to Italy in 1525; and became a Protestant.

Utenhove left Flanders in 1544; a morality play, written by him in 1532, was ill-received when performed in 1543. From this time, he had a peripatetic existence, and would travel all over Europe. In the summer of 1548 Utenhove came to England from Strasbourg in advance of Laski, and co-operated with him in the organisation of the strangers' churches in London and Canterbury. It was on his recommendation that Valérand Poullain of Lille was brought over from Strasbourg as pastor of the French-speaking Protestant exiles at Canterbury. Poullain organised an offshoot from this community at Glastonbury, under the patronage of Lord Protector Somerset. To Glastonbury Utenhove sent Flemish and Walloon weavers, who introduced the manufacture of broadcloth and blankets in the west of England. John Hooper employed Utenhove on a mission to Heinrich Bullinger in Switzerland in April 1549. He left England with Laski in 1553.

He lived in Strasbourg, Emden and Poland, where he met and married his wife, Anna. From 1559, at the accession of Elizabeth I of England, Utenhove once more took up residence in London, where he remained until his death in 1566. He took a leading part in affairs as the 'first elder' of the Dutch church. He died in London in 1565, leaving a widow (Anna de Grutere de Lannoy) and three children.

== Works ==
During his stay in London, where he played an important role in the local Dutch church community, Utenhove translated the Psalms, which were published in 1566 as De Psalmen Davids ("The Psalms of David"). That same year saw the publication of his translation of the New Testament, Het Nieuwe Testament na der Griekscher waerheyt in Nederlandsche sprake grondlick end trauwelick overghezett ("The New Testament Translated Thoroughly and Faithfully into the Dutch Tongue According to the Original Greek") at the request of the church community of Emden.

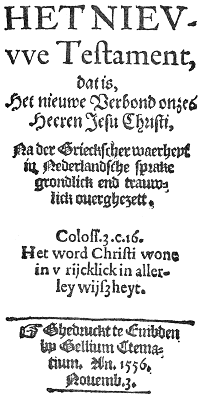
Title page, Emden 1556.

He also wrote ‘Simplex et Fidelis Narratio de … Belgarum aliorumque Peregrinorum in Anglia Ecclesia,’ Basle, 1560. Laski's London ‘Catechismus’ (distinct from the Emden one) is known in the Flemish version by Utenhove, printed at London in 1551.

His translation of the New Testament is important for Dutch literary history as it is the first complete translation of any Bible part into Dutch, and as it borrows significantly from the eastern Low Saxon dialects of Dutch, it is also one of the first literary documents from that part of the Low Countries. His attempt to translate the Greek text as literally as possible and highbrow choice of vocabulary, however, prevented widespread acceptance of the translation.

== Notes ==
Attribution

This article incorporates text from a publication now in the public domain: "Utenhove, John". Dictionary of National Biography. London: Smith, Elder & Co. 1885–1900.
