= François Peruçel de la Rivière =

François Perucel, also known as de la Rivière, was an influential 16th-century French Protestant.

Perucel led the first congregations of Huguenots in England, taking over from Jan Utenhove when he moved to London in 1549. Having spent some time at the pastor of the French Church, London, aided by Katherine Willoughby, Duchess of Suffolk, Perucel started a colony of Protestants in Wesel, which took in many of the Marian exiles, including in time, the Duchess and her husband, Richard Bertie.
