= Saye =

Woollen cloth from 15-16th century england

Saye is a woollen cloth woven in the west and south of England in and around the 15th and 16th centuries.

On 21 June 1661 the diary of Samuel Pepys recorded purchasing "green Say ... for curtains in my parler".

In 1541 Cecily Aylmer, the daughter of Richard Aylmer, Mayor of Norwich, leaves Mother Manfold 'my best petticoat and an apron of saye', while Mother Plank gets 'my worst petticoat and my worst apron.'

Norwich tailor Edmund Peckover, in his very long and detailed 1592 bill to Nathaniel Bacon of Stiffkey, Norfolk, charged xxxv s (35 shillings - £1.75) for 15 yards of saye to line three ladies gowns.

A related sort of cloth was serica, which was finer, since it also contained silk.
