= Pierre Brully =

Pierre Brully (Brusly, Petrus Brulius; 1518?–1545) was a Calvinist minister from Lorraine, executed for teaching his beliefs.

== Life ==
He was born at Mersilhaut (Mercy-le-Haut) near Metz. Educated for the Catholic Church, he became lector in the Dominican convent at Metz and was expelled in 1540 or 1541 for his sympathies with the Protestant Reformation.

In July 1541, he was in Strasbourg and intimate with Jean Calvin, in whose house he lived. When Calvin was recalled to Geneva later in that year, Brully succeeded him in the Strasburg pastorate. In September 1544, he undertook a missionary journey to Flanders, invited to Tournai by some who wished instruction. He preached there and in other cities, in secret, as teaching Protestant doctrine was forbidden. He was arrested at Tournai in November, condemned and burned at the stake on 19 February 1545, despite efforts to save him from Strasbourg and by Protestant princes in Germany.
