= Black Mill =

Black Mill is the name of a number of windmills, and to a lesser extent watermills in the United Kingdom.

== Windmills ==
- Black Mill, Aldeburgh, a windmill in Suffolk
- Black Mill, Barham, a windmill in Kent
- Black Mill, Bethersden, a windmill in Kent
- Black Mill, Belton, a windmill now in Norfolk
- Black Mill, Beverley, a windmill in the East Riding of Yorkshire
- Black Mill, Bexhill, a windmill in East Sussex
- Black Mill, Bognor Regis, a windmill in West Sussex
- Black Mill, Botesdale, a windmill in Suffolk
- Black Mill, Brighton, a windmill in East Sussex
- Black Mill, Burgh Castle, a windmill now in Norfolk
- Black Mill, Cawston, a windmill in Norfolk
- Black Mill, Chatteris, a windmill in Cambridgeshire
- Black Mill, The Dicker, Chiddingly, a windmill in East Sussex
- Black Mill, Corpusty, a windmill in Norfolk
- Black Mill, Croydon a windmill in Surrey
- Black Mill, East Blatchington a windmill in East Sussed
- Black Mill, East Bergholt, a windmill in Suffolk
- Black Mill, Eastbourne, a windmill in East Sussex
- Black Mill, Elsworth, a windmill in Cambridgeshire
- Black Mill, Felpham, a windmill in West Sussex
- Black Mill, Forncett St Peter, a windmill in Norfolk
- Black Mill, Harbledown, a windmill in Kent
- Black Mill, Headcorn, a windmill in Kent
- Black Mill, Horsey, a windmill in Norfolk
- Black Mill, Loddon, a windmill in Norfolk
- Black Mill, Ludham, a Norfolk
- Black Mill, Lyminge, a windmill in Kent
- Black Mill, Moulton St Mary, a windmill in Norfolk
- Black Mill, North Cove, a windmill in Suffolk
- Black Mill, Ore, a windmill in East Sussex
- Black Mill, Orford, a windmill in Suffolk
- Black Mill, Patrington a windmill in the East Riding of Yorkshire
- Black Mill, Playden, a windmill in East Sussex
- Black Mill, Sandwich, a windmill in Kent
- Black Mill, Sidestrand, a windmill in Norfolk
- Black Mill, Smarden, a windmill in Kent
- Black Mill, Southwold, a windmill in Suffolk
- Black Mill, Stone Cross, a windmill in East Sussex
- Black Mill, Storrington, a West Sussex
- Black Mill, Thorpe, a Windmill in Norfolk
- Black Mill, Upton, a windmill in Norfolk
- Black Mill, Waxholme, East Riding of Yorkshire
- Black Mill, Wheatacre, a windmill in Norfolk
- Black Mill, Whitstable, a windmill in Kent
- Black Mill, Wyverstone, a, windmill in Suffolk
- Black Mill, Yaxley, a windmill in Cambridgeshire
- St Martin's Black Mill, Canterbury, a windmill in Kent
- Banham's Black Mill, Freethorpe, a windmill in Norfolk
- Greengrass's Black Mill, Great Yarmouth, a windmill in Norfolk

== Watermills ==
- Black Mill, Sturry

== See also ==
- Blackmill (disambiguation)
