= Blackmill (disambiguation) =

Blackmill is a small village in the south of Wales, UK.

Blackmill may also refer to:

- Blackmill (musician), British electronic music producer
- Blackmill Games, a gaming company that co-developed Verdun
- Blackmill Loch, a dammed reservoir in Argyll and Bute, Scotland
- Blackmill Woodlands, an oak forest near the village of Blackmill in Wales

== See also ==
- Black Mill (disambiguation)
- Blackmail (disambiguation)
