= H.S. Pledge & Sons Ltd =

English milling company

H S Pledge & Sons Ltd
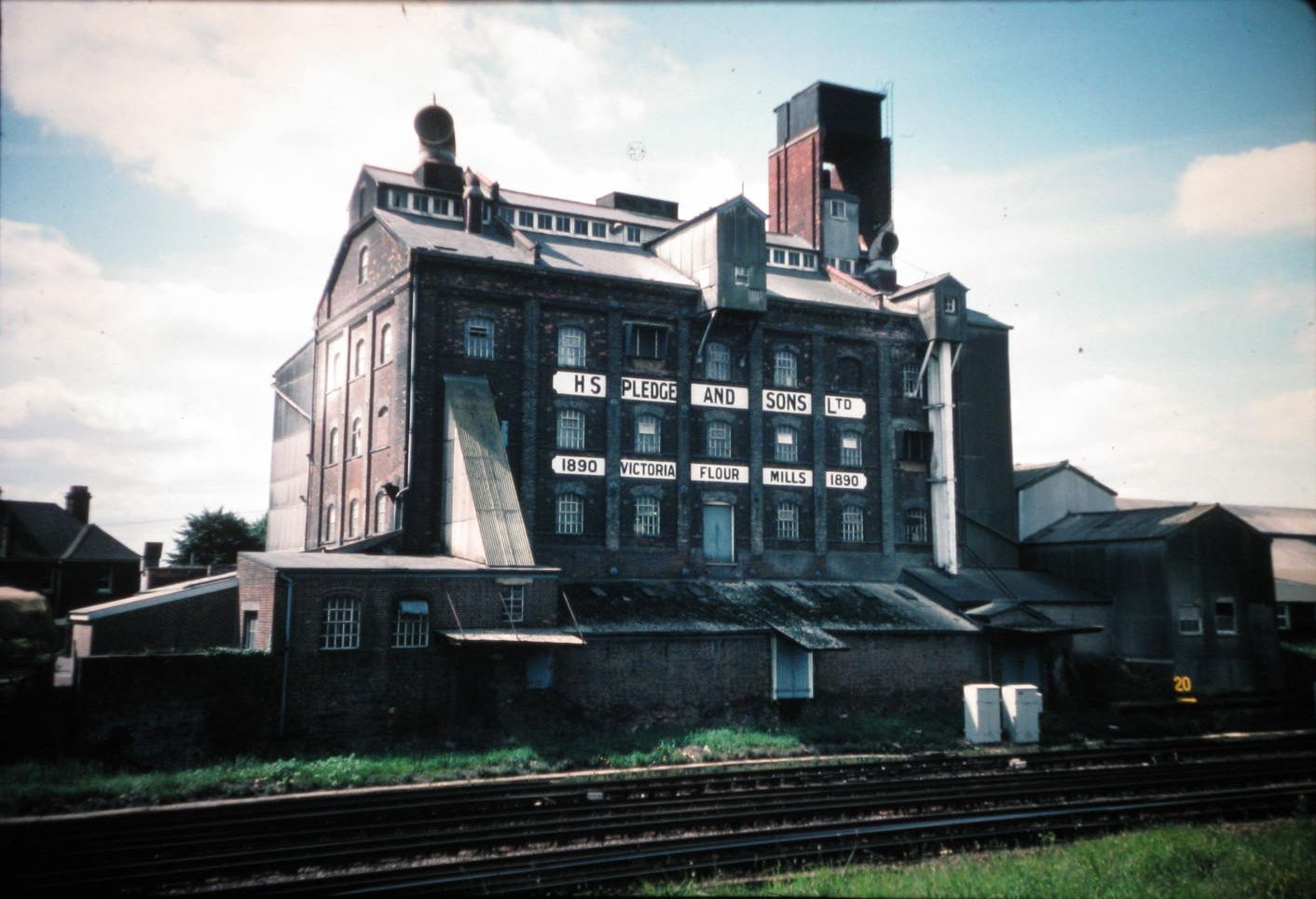
- Victoria Mills, Ashford, August 1982
- Type: Private
- Industry: Food
- Founded: 1890
- Founder: Henry Sturgess Pledge
- Headquarters: Ashford, Kent, England
- Products: Flour, animal feed

H. S. Pledge & Sons Ltd was a business engaged in the milling industry in England. The firm was started by Henry Sturgess Pledge, who learnt his trade at the Black Mill at Barham near Canterbury in Kent. The company operated at Ashford until 1984 when its remaining mill was destroyed by fire.

== History ==
The firm was started in 1890 by Henry Sturgess Pledge. He was apprenticed at the Black Mill, Barham around 1850. Upon leaving Barham some time before 1882, Pledge ran the Wind, Steam and Water Mills at Kennington until 1892. Pledge ran the company with his sons Lawrence John Pledge and Walter Ebeneser Pledge. H S Pledge & Sons Ltd were millers and corn merchants owning two mills in Ashford; Victoria Mills and East Hill Mill.

=== East Hill Mill – grid reference TR 015 427 ===
East Hill Mill was a watermill and steam mill. It is still standing at the bottom of East Hill Road, Ashford. As of 2010, it is a nightclub owned by Luminar Leisure called Liquid and Envy.

The building date is stated on the mill: "Flour Mill 1901". In the 1901 census of West Ashford the miller was Pledge's son Lawrence; he lived at the mill with his wife Ellen and six children.

=== Victoria Mills – TR 008 423 ===
The Victoria Mills was a steam mill. It was built in 1890. The date was prominently displayed on the mill building. In the 1901 census the miller was Pledge's son Walter, who lived at the Mill with his wife Emma. Victoria Mills continued functioning until September 1984, when the building was gutted by fire. The mill was then demolished as it was in an unsafe condition. The company had been taken over by the Garnham Family. In 2014 the company was dissolved.

== Sources ==
- Coles Finch, William (1933). Watermills & Windmills. London: C W Daniel & Co.
- Kelly, E R (1882). Directory of Kent. London: Kelly & Co.
- Kelly, E R (1903). Directory of Kent. London: Kelly & Co.
- Kelly, E R (1913). Directory of Kent. London: Kelly & Co.
