= Draper's Mill, Margate =

Windmill in Margate, Kent, England

Draper's Windmill, Margate
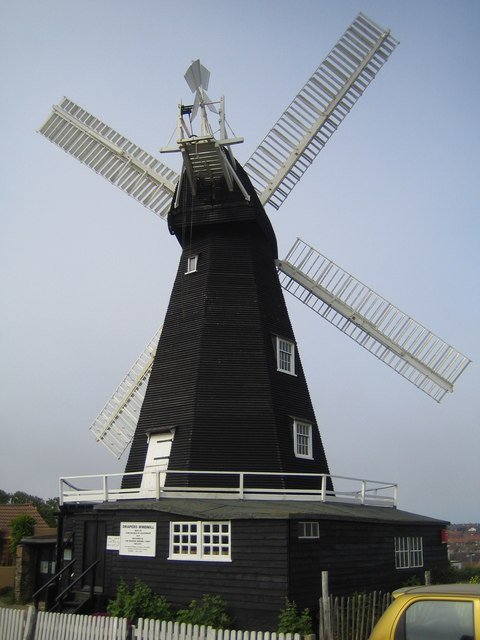
- Interactive map of Draper's Windmill, Margate

Origin
- Grid reference: TR 363 700
- Coordinates: 51°22′47.7″N 1°23′36″E
- Operator: Kent County Council
- Year built: 1845

Information
- Purpose: Corn mill
- Type: Smock mill
- Storeys: Four-storey smock
- Base storeys: Single-storey base
- Smock sides: Eight-sided
- No. of sails: Four
- Type of sails: Double Patent sails
- Windshaft: Cast iron
- Winding: Fantail
- Fantail blades: Six blades
- Auxiliary power: Gas engine
- No. of pairs of millstones: Three pairs

Draper's Windmill or Old Mill is a Grade II* listed smock mill in Margate, Kent, England that was built in 1845.

== History ==
Draper's Windmill was built in 1845 by John Holman, the Canterbury millwright, replacing an earlier mill that had previously been moved here from Nayland Point. It is the sole survivor of a group of three windmills, Draper's Mill, Little Draper's Mill and The Pumper. A mill was marked on Robert Morden's map of 1695, Harris's map of 1719 and the 1819-43 Ordnance Survey (OS) map. The 1858-72 OS map shows three mills. The 1903-10 OS map shows two mills. The mill worked by wind until 1916, and by a 20 horsepower (15 kW) gas engine until the late 1930s. The sails and fantail were removed in 1927. The mill was threatened with demolition in 1965, but the Draper's Windmill Trust was formed by Mr R M Towes the then Head Master of Drapers Mills School (opposite Drapers Windmill) to preserve the mill, and in 1968 the Kent Education Committee acquired the mill, which was restored at a cost of over £2,000. The fantail was replaced in 1970, and one pair of sails were erected in December 1971. The new stage that had been prepared for fitting on Black Mill, Barham was donated to Draper's mill, when Black Mill was destroyed by fire, it was adapted to fit by Vincent Pargeter. The second pair of sails were fitted in the autumn of 1974.

== Description ==
Draper's Windmill is a four-storey smock mill on a single-storey brick base. There is a stage at first-floor level. It has four double Patent sails are 26 feet 6 inches (8.08 m) long and 6 feet 6 inches (1.98 m) wide, spanning 66 feet (20.12 m). They are carried on a cast-iron windshaft. The mill is winded by a fantail. The Brake Wheel is 8 feet 6 inches (2.59 m) diameter. The three pairs of millstones are driven overdrift.

== Millers ==
- J Banks 1847
- F & E Darby
- Thomas Messiter Ind JP
- Thomas R Laidlaw

References for above:-
