= Mills in Canterbury =

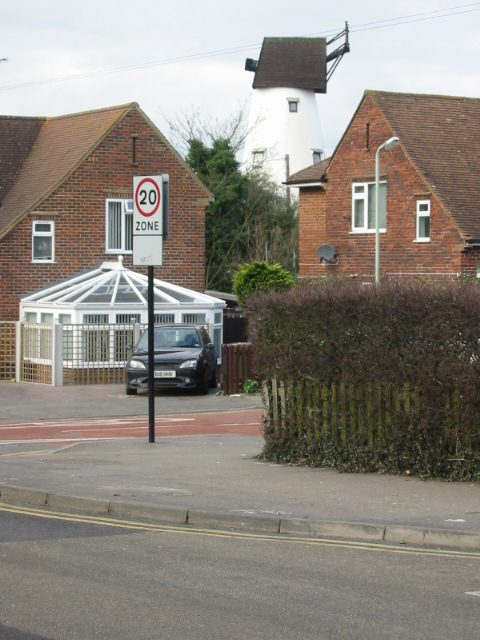
St Martin's mill

The city of Canterbury in Kent, England has been served by mills over the centuries. These include animal engines, watermills and windmills.

== Animal engines ==
A rare survivor is the treadwheel in the Bell Harry tower of Canterbury Cathedral.

== Watermills ==
There were a total of ten watermills at various time on the Great Stour river. They are covered in the article on the Stour watermills.

== Windmills ==
A total of six windmills are known to have stood in Canterbury.

- St Martin's Mill, (TR 165 578 51°16′41″N 1°06′11″E) a tower mill built in 1817 and working until 1890, now a house conversion.
- St Martin's Black Mill, a smock mill that was marked on the 1819-43 Ordnance Survey map and demolished in 1868. The sails and major machinery being installed in New Mill, Blean. The mill had a three storey smock on a two storey base, with a stage at first floor level. There was one pair of shuttered sails and one pair of common sails. It was winded by a fantail.
- St Lawrence Mill, a smock mill marked on the 1819-43 Ordnance Survey map that was burnt down on 15 May 1873. The millers were Richard Fuller in 1845 and J Chantler in 1862. This mill stood on or near the site of Canterbury's earliest recorded windmill, which stood at Little Foxmould in the Ridingate area. This mill was granted to the Hospital of Eastbridge by the Prioress and Nuns of the church of St Sepulchre early in the thirteenth century.
- Dane John Mill, (TR 148 574 51°16′30″N 1°04′41″E) a post mill advertised for sale in the Kentish Post in 1731 and rebuilt in 1790 by James Simmonds. John Parker was the miller in 1839.
- Franciscan Gardens, a smock mill shown in a print dated 1846.
- St. Thomas' Hill, a mill shown in prints dated 1816, 1835 and 1856. John Goble or Gobell was the miller in 1839.
