= List of windmills in Cambridgeshire =

Extant windmills in Cambridgeshire.
1 Barnack, 2 Barrington, 3 Bourn, 4 Burwell, 5 Chesterton, 6 Castor, 7 Chippenham, 8 Cottenham, 9 Doddington, 10 Eaton Socon, 11 Elsworth, 12 Foxton, 13 Fulbourn, 14 Great Chishill, 15 Great Gidding, 16 Great Gransden, 17 Guilden Morden, 18 Haddenham, 19 Hemingford Grey, 20 Hildersham, 21 Ickleton, 22 Impington, 23 Little Downham, 24 Little Wilbraham, 25 Madingley, 26 Over, 27 Pymore, 28 Ramsey St Mary's, 29 Sawtry, 30 Six Mile Bottom, 31 Soham (Downfield), 32 Soham (Northfield), 33 Spaldwick, 34 Steeple Morden, 35 Stretham, 36 Swaffham Prior, 37 Swaffham Prior (Foster's), 38 Swavesey, 39 Thorney, 40 Upwood, 41 Werrington, 42 West Wickham, 43 West Wratting, 44 Whittlesey, 45 Wicken, 46 Wicken Fen, 47 Willingham, 48 Wisbech.

A list of all windmills and windmill sites which lie in the current ceremonial county of Cambridgeshire.

== Locations ==
=== A - B ===
Location	Name of mill and grid reference	Type	Maps	First mention or built	Last mention or demise	Photograph
Alconbury	Alconbury Mill; TL 181 758	Post			Blown down 1936	
Arrington	TL 323 511	Tower		1891	1926; Windmill World	
Ashley	TL 715 617	Smock		1741	1940; Windmill World	
Balsham	TL 578 504	Smock		1831	Demolished 1963; Windmill World	
Barnack	Barnack Mill; TF 069 049	Tower			Windmill World	
Barrington	Orwell Mill; TL 386 492	Tower		1822	Windmill World	
Bluntisham	Town Mill; TL 375 748	Post		18th century	Demolished 1899	
Bluntisham	Wood End Mill; TL 359 751	Tower		19th century	Demolished 1926	
Bourn	Bourn Windmill; TL 3118 5800	Post		1636	Windmill World	
Buckden	Buckden Mill; TL 187 673	Tower		1830	Demolished c. 1893; Windmill World	
Burrough Green		Post		1764	1796, moved to Westley Waterless by 1810	
Burwell	Stevens' Mill; TL 590 665	Tower		c. 1820	Windmill World	
Burwell	Big Mill; TL 591 666	Smock		Early 19th century	Windmill World	
Burwell	Busy Bee Mill; TL 592 676	Smock				

=== C - D ===
Location	Name of mill and grid reference	Type	Maps	First mention or built	Last mention or demise	Photograph
Chesterton	Milton Road; TL 456 601	Smock		1827	Burnt down 12 May 1855	
Chesterton	Milton Road aka Union Mill aka Hurst Park Mill; TL 456 601	Tower	1885	1855	Demolished April 1957	Images available for viewing here or here
Chesterton	French's Mill; TL 445 599	Smock		1847	Windmill World	
Castor	Castor Mill; TL 129 968	Tower			Windmill World	
Chatteris	Black Mill; TL 391849	Smock				
Cherry Hinton		Sunk post				
Chippenham	Chippenham Mill; TL 657 706	Smock		1883	Base remains, house converted Windmill World	
Christchurch	Lavender's Mill; TL 492 984	Smock				
Christchurch	Drake's Mill	Tower		1860	1903	
Christchurch	Key's Mill	Smock		1875	Demolished c. 1950	
Coates	TL 303 974	Tower			Windmill World	
Cottenham	Cottenham Windmill; TL 444 674	Tower			Windmill World	
Doddington		Post		1669	Demolished 16 April 1879	
Doddington	Doddington Mill; TL 400 909	Tower		1810	Windmill World	

=== E ===
Location	Name of mill and grid reference	Type	Maps	First mention or built	Last mention or demise	Photograph
Easton	Mill Hill Mill	Post		c. 1820	Moved to Ellington c. 1845	
Eaton Socon		Post		c. 1700	Burnt down 1814	
Eaton Socon	Duloe Mill; TL 171 602	Tower		1815	Windmill World	
Ellington	Ellington Mill; TL 159 718	Post		c. 1845	Moved to Madingley 1936	
Elm		Smock		1616	1616	
Elm	Chapel Lane; TF 4805 0670	Smock	1797; 1826	1797	1904	
Elsworth	Papworth's Mill; Black Mill; TL 326 642	Tower		c. 1825	Windmill World	
Elsworth	TL 304 637	Smock			1930s	
Ely	Cobbin's Mill; TL 533 818	Smock			Carried 1732 datestone. Demolished April 1954. Windmill World	
Ely	Mount Hill Mill		1610	1610	1610	
Ely	North of the city		1610	1610	1610	
Ely	North east of the city		1610	1610	1610	
Eye	Eye Windmill; TF 231 030	Tower		1850	Demolished 1954	
Eye Green	Eye Green Mill; TF 229 036	Smock				

=== F - G ===
Location	Name of mill and grid reference	Type	Maps	First mention or built	Last mention or demise	Photograph
Fenstanton	Fenstanton Mill; TL 312 703	Post			Windmill World	
Fordham	TL 639 724	Smock				
Foxton	Foxton Mill; TL 407 483	Smock			Windmill World	
Fulbourn	Fulbourn Mill; TL 510 559	Smock		1808	Windmill World	
Gamlingay	TL 237 512	Smock			Demolished 1977	
Gorefield	New Mill; Ward's Mill; TF 412 121	Smock		1836	1933	
Great Chishill	Great Chishill Mill; TL 413 388	Post		1819	Windmill World	
Great Gidding		Post			Demolished c. 1820	
Great Gidding	Great Gidding Mill; TL 123 831	Tower		c. 1820	Windmill World	
Great Gransden	Great Gransden Mill; TL 277 555	Post		1612	Windmill World	
Great Wilbraham	TL 552 565	Smock				
Guilden Morden	Hook's Mill; TL 271 453	Tower		1865	Windmill World	
Guyhirn		Tower		1871	1871	

=== H - I ===
Location	Name of mill and grid reference	Type	Maps	First mention or built	Last mention or demise	Photograph
Haddenham	Great Mill; TL 458 745	Tower		1803	Windmill World	
Haddenham	Setchell's Mill; TL 456 745	Tower				
Harston	TL 433 502	Tower			Windmill World	
Hemingford Grey	Hemingford Grey Mill; TL 300 708	Tower		1820	Windmill World	
Hildersham	Hildersham Mill; TL 545 480	Tower		1863	Windmill World	
Holywell	Holywell Mill; TL 341 715	Post		1741	Demolished 1930s Windmill World	
Ickleton	Ickleton Mill; TL 486 443	Tower			Windmill World	
Ickleton	Great Chesterford Mill	Smock		1903	Demolished c. 1918	
Impington	Histon Mill; TL 442 624	Smock		1808	Windmill World	

=== K - L ===
Location	Name of mill and grid reference	Type	Maps	First mention or built	Last mention or demise	Photograph
Kneesworth	TL 339 444	Tower			Demolished 1976	
Leverington				Pre 1317		
Leverington		Post		1581	1597	
Leverington	Horseshoe Corner			1727	Moved to Walsoken, Norfolk, 1778	
Leverington	Gooden's Mill			1732	1732	
Leverington	White Engine Mill	Smock		1796	Burnt down 19 March 1826	
Leverington	White Engine Mill	Tower		1827	1916, gone by 1920	
Linton	TL 567 441	Tower		1836	Demolished 1926	
Little Downham				1251		
Little Downham	Cornwell's Mill; TL 532 838	Tower			Windmill World	
Little Downham	Good Intent Mill	Tower			Burnt down 13 June 1884.	
Little Paxton	Little Paxton Mill; TL 184 618	Smock			Standing c. 1864	
Littleport	Arber's Mill; TL 580 883	Tower		1840s		
Little Wilbraham	Little Wilbraham Mill; TL 536 583	Tower		c. 1820	Windmill World	
Lode	TL 511 656	Smock			Demolished c. 1885	

=== M - O ===
Location	Name of mill and grid reference	Type	Maps	First mention or built	Last mention or demise	Photograph
Madingley	Madingley Mill; TL 407 596	Post			Collapsed July 1909	
Madingley	Madingley Mill; TL 407 596	Post		1936	Windmill World	
Manea	TL 481 903	Tower				
March	Southwell's Mill; TL 409 975	Smock				
March	Billitt's Mill			1862	1929	
Murrow			1826	1826		
New Fletton	New Fletton Mill; TL 192 978	Tower		c. 1870	Demolished 1974	
Oakington	TL 403 650	Tower		1863		
Old Weston	Old Weston Mill; TL 101 762	Post		c. 1700	Standing 1918	
Over	Over Mill; TL 380 689	Tower		c. 1860	Windmill World	

=== P - R ===
Location	Name of mill and grid reference	Type	Maps	First mention or built	Last mention or demise	Photograph
Pymore	Pymore Mill; TL 501 864	Tower			Windmill World	
Ramsey	Ramsey Mill; TL 289 856	Tower			Windmill World	
Ramsey	Lotting Fen Mill	Tower				
Ramsey	Ramsey Mere; TL 307 897	Tower				
Ramsey	Ramsey Mere; TL 305 894	Tower		1870	1938	
Ramsey Heights	TL 239 850	Tower		1870	1916	
Ramsey St Mary's	Ugg Mere Mill; St Mary's Mill; TL 248 875	Tower			Windmill World	
Royston	Mill Road Mill; TL 359 415	Midlands Post				
Royston	Melbourn Road Mill; TL 367 426					

=== S ===
Location	Name of mill and grid reference	Type	Maps	First mention or built	Last mention or demise	Photograph
Sawtry	Bannister's Mill; TL 163 836	Smock		1778	Windmill World	
Shudy Camps	TL 619 442	Post			1920	
Six Mile Bottom	Bungalow Hill Mill; TL 588 582	Post		1846	Windmill World	
Soham	Pollards Mill; Downfield Mill; TL 608 717	Smock		1726	Severely damaged 1887, rebuilt as tower mill	
Soham	Downfield Mill; TL 608 717	Tower		1887	Windmill World	
Soham	Northfield Mill also known as Shade Mill; Townsend Mill; TL 587 751	Smock		1830s	Northfield Windmill; Windmill World	
Soham	Hardfield Mill; TL 607 718	Smock				
Soham	Soham Mere; TL 565 741	Smock		1867	Demolished 1948	
Soham	White Top Mills (four); TL 618 810	Smock x4			One mill standing 1930	
Somersham	Mill Farm Mill; Approximately TL 366 817	Smock				
Spaldwick	TL 129 737	Post			Burnt down c. 1881	
Spaldwick	Belton's Mill; TL 129 737	Tower		1881	Windmill World	
Stanground	Farcet Mill; TL 202 957	Tower		19th century	Demolished c. 1910; Windmill World	
Stapleford	TL 483 521	Smock			c. 1930	
Steeple Morden	Saunderson's Mill; TL 284 420	Smock		1805	Windmill World	
Stretham	TL 512 750	Post			Demolished c. 1880	
Stretham	Stretham Windmill; TL 512 750	Tower		1880	Windmill World	
Sutton-in-the-Isle	Sutton Mill	Post			Destroyed by fire 20 June 1912.	
Swaffham Bulbeck	TL 559 623	Smock				
Swaffham Prior	TL 574 642	Smock		1830	Demolished c. 1875	
Swaffham Prior	Swaffham Prior Mill; TL 574 642	Smock		1864	Windmill World	
Swaffham Prior	TL 572 643	Post			Demolished c. 1860	
Swaffham Prior	Foster's Mill; TL 572 643	Tower		1860	Windmill World	
Swavesey	TL 354 687				Demolished c. 1866	
Swavesey	Hale Mill; TL 354 687	tower		1866	Windmill World	

=== T ===
Location	Name of mill and grid reference	Type	Maps	First mention or built	Last mention or demise	Photograph
Thorney	Thorney Mill; TF 278 043	Tower		1787	Windmill World	
Tilbrook	Tilbrook Mill; TL 070 695	Post			Standing 1906	
Trumpington	TL 448 557	Tower				
Tydd St Giles				1871	1929	
Tydd St Giles	Redmoor Mill	Post		1879	1883	
Tydd St Giles		Smock				

=== U - Y ===
Location	Name of mill and grid reference	Type	Maps	First mention or built	Last mention or demise	Photograph
Upwood	Setchell's Mill; TL 259 821	Tower		1852	Windmill World	
Warboys	Ramsey Road Mill; TL 294 808	Tower				
Warboys	Mill Green Mill; TL 310 804	Tower		19th century		
Warboys	Behagg's Mill; TL 311 802	Tower		c. 1850	Standing 1926	
Werrington	Werrington Mill; TF 165 034	Tower			Windmill World	
Westley Waterless		Post		1810	Moved to Six Mile Bottom 1846	
Weston Colville	Weston Colville; TL 619 529	Smock		c. 1830	Windmill World	
West Wickham	Streetley End Mill; TL 614 482	Tower		1802	Windmill World	
West Wratting	West Wratting Mill; TL 604 510	Smock		1726	Windmill World	
Whittlesey	Fletcher's Mill; TL 281 960	Tower			Windmill World	
Whittlesey	Elderkin's Mill; TL 264 975	Tower		Early to mid-19th century	Windmill World	
Wicken	Wicken Mill; TL 571 706	Smock			Windmill World	
Wicken	Adventurer's Fen	Smock		1908	Moved to Wicken Fen 1956	
Wicken	Spinney Bank Mill; TL 552 709	Smock			1920s	
Wicken Fen	Wicken Fen Windpump; TL 562 706	Smock		1956	Windmill World	
Willingham	Cattell's Mill; TL 404 698			1828	Windmill World	
Willingham	Ingle's Mill; TL 408 696	Smock		c. 1812	Demolished 1956; Windmill World	
Winwick	Winwick Mill; TL 100 181	Tower			Demolished 1935	
Wisbech	TF 464 101	Post		1583	Struck by lightning and demolished 1778	
Wisbech	Leach's Mill; TF 464 101	Tower		1778	Windmill World	
Wisbech				1277	1356	
Wisbech				1356	1356	
Wisbech	Market Place			1571	Demolished 1750	
Wisbech	Lynn Road, Clarkson Mill	Post		1690	Demolished May 1886	
Wisbech	Leverington Road, Red Engine Mill	Smock		1792	Demolished July 1890	
Wisbech	Old Playhouse	Post		1752	Demolished c. 1805	
Wisbech	Leverington Road, Webster's Mill	Post		1750s	1887, gone by 1895	
Wisbech	Leverington Road	Post		1772	Burnt down 1792	
Wisbech	Leverington Road, Bell's Mill	Post		1772	1846	
Wisbech	North Brink, Bowles Mill	Tower		c. 1772	Demolished 1928	
Wisbech	Timber Market			1348	1348	
Wisbech	Timber Market, Brewin's Mill			1752	1865, gone by 1886	
Wistow	Wistow Mill; TL 271 803	Tower				
Woodditton	TL 664 593	Smock		c. 1840	Demolished 1936; Windmill World	
Wood Walton Fen	Higney Mill; Charterhouse mill TL 215 863	Tower		1874	1924; Windmill World	
Yaxley	Black Mill; TL 172 916	Tower		1671	Demolished 1935	
Yaxley	Yaxley Mill; TL 179 924	Tower		1842		
Yelling	Yelling Mill; TL 249 625	Post				

== Locations formerly within Cambridgeshire ==
For mills in Upwell and Walpole St Peter see List of windmills in Norfolk.

== Maps ==
- 1610 - Map of Huntingdonshire, 1610, John Speed
- 1797 - William Faden
- 1826 - Andrew Bryant
- 1885 - Ordnance Survey 25 inch England and Wales

== Notes ==
Mills in bold are still standing, known building dates are indicated in bold. Text in italics denotes indicates that the information is not confirmed, but is likely to be the case stated.

== Sources ==
Unless otherwise stated, the source for all entries is Stevens, Robert (1985). Cambridgeshire Windmills and Watermills. Cambridge: Cambridgeshire Wind and Watermill Society.
