= Black Mill, Barham =

Windmill in Barham, Kent, England

- The mill when a working mill
- Interactive map of Black Mill, Barham

Origin
- Mill name: Black Mill; Barham Downs Mill
- Grid reference: TR 214 510
- Coordinates: 51.215°N 1.169°E
- Year built: 1834

Information
- Purpose: Corn mill
- Type: Smock mill
- Storeys: Three-storey smock
- Base storeys: Two-storey base
- Smock sides: Eight-sided
- No. of sails: Four
- Type of sails: Patent sails
- Windshaft: cast iron
- Winding: Fantail
- Fantail blades: Six blades
- No. of pairs of millstones: Four pairs
- Year lost: 1970
- Other information: Burnt down while under restoration.

Black Mill or Barham Downs Mill was a smock mill at Barham, Kent, England which was accidentally burnt down in 1970 while under restoration.

== History ==
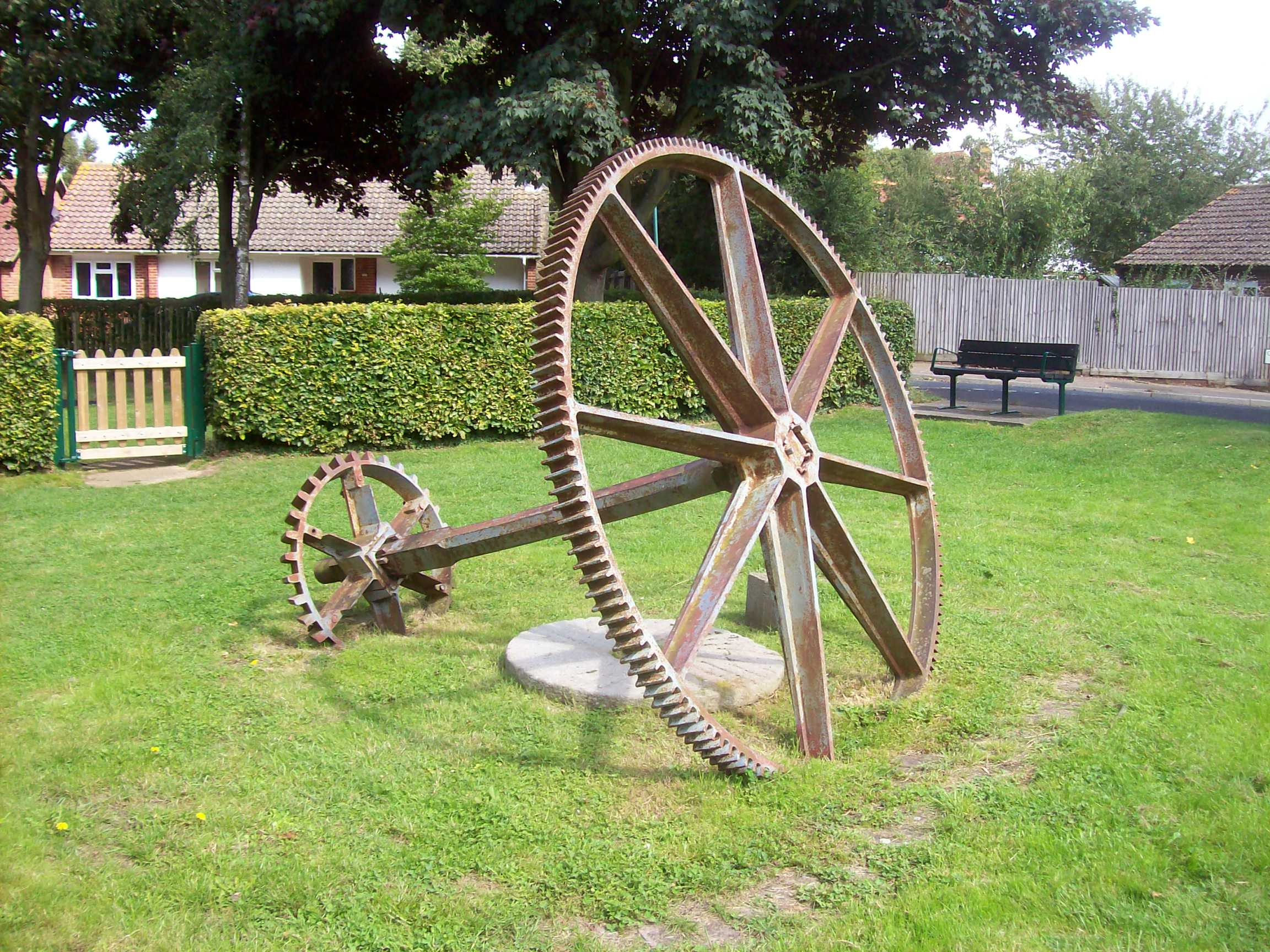
The machinery displayed on the village green.

Black Mill was the third mill on the site. There was a mill on Barham Down in the thirteenth century. A mill was marked on Philip Symonson's map of 1596, John Speed's map of 1611, Robert Morden's map of 1695 and Emanuel Bowen's map of 1736. This mill was originally a little lower down the hill, and was moved to a new position higher up.

The second mill was marked on the 1819–43 Ordnance Survey map.

The Black Mill was built by John Holman, the Canterbury millwright in 1834. She was worked for many years by H S Pledge, then R Walter for over 50 years, and after that by T Denne and Sons. The mill was struck by lightning on 17 June 1878 and lost a sail. Over £150 had to be spent to repair the mill. The last owner, Mr E Mannering, fitted the fantail from Willesborough windmill in 1946, and restored the mill in 1956. He was awarded a Windmill Certificate by the Society for the Protection of Ancient Buildings for his efforts. The work was done by Holman's of Canterbury, the last millwrighting they did before the firm stopped doing millwrighting work. Kent County Council contributed £400 towards the restoration work. The work included the replacement of two sails that had been blown off in a storm on 13 March 1951. The mill featured in the 1955 film "Raising a Riot" starring Kenneth More. The mill was purchased by Kent County Council in the late 1960s and burnt down on 3 March 1970 when a spark from a bonfire set light to the mill. A new stage had been prepared for the restored mill, and this was donated to Draper's Windmill, Margate and erected there by Vincent Pargeter.

== Description ==
Black Mill was a four-storey smock mill mounted on a single-storey brick base. It had four single patent sails mounted on a cast-iron windshaft and was winded by a fantail. The mill drove four pairs of millstones.

== Millers ==
- E Lawrence, miller in 1845
- Henry Sturgess Pledge, miller in 1850, later working the Wind, Steam and Water mill at Kennington.
- Richard Walter
- T Denne and Sons Ltd, millers in 1933, still in business at Hanover Mill, Mersham.
- W Mannering
