= Blackmail (disambiguation) =

Blackmail is the act of threatening to reveal potentially incriminating information about a person or group unless a specific demand is met.

Blackmailer, Blackmailed or Blackmail may also refer to:

== Films, TV episodes and plays ==
- Blackmail (1920 film), American silent drama directed by Dallas M. Fitzgerald
- Blackmailed (1920 film), German silent crime drama
- Blackmail (play), 1928 British thriller by Charles Bennett
- Blackmail (1929 film), British adaptation of Bennett's play, directed by Alfred Hitchcock
- Blackmailer (1936 film), American thriller directed by Gordon Wiles
- Blackmailer (1937 film), Czechoslovak drama directed by Ladislav Brom
- Blackmail (1939 film), American crime drama starring Edward G. Robinson
- Blackmail (1947 film), American crime noir
- Blackmailed (1951 film), British drama directed by Marc Allegret
- Blackmail (1955 film), French crime film directed by Guy Lefranc
- Blackmail (1973 film), Indian Bollywood thriller directed by Vijay Anand
- Black Mail (1985 film), Indian Malayalam drama directed by Crossbelt Mani
- Blackmail (1991 film), American TV film for USA Network, starring Susan Blakely
- Blackmail (2005 film), Indian Hindi-language action thriller directed by Anil Devgan
- Blackmail (webisodes), 2009 spin-off series of The Office mini-episodes
- "Blackmail" (Law & Order), 2010 episode of NBC legal drama, Law & Order
- Blackmail (2018 film), Indian Hindi-language black comedy directed by Abhinay Deo

== Music ==
- "Blackmail", 1975 song by 10cc from album The Original Soundtrack
- Blackmail (band), German alternative rock performers active since 1993
- Blackmail (album), 1994–1997 debut recordings of above band
- "Blackmail", a song by Swans originally from the EP A Screw

== Other ==
- Emotional blackmail, a form of psychological manipulation
