= Burwell Museum =

Mill museum in Cambridgeshire, England

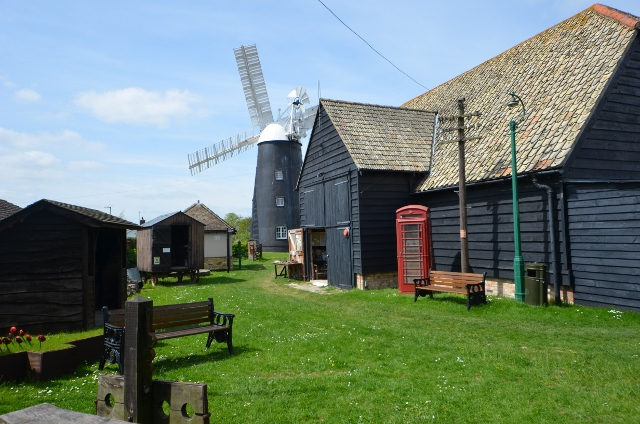

- Location within Cambridgeshire
- Established: 1992
- Location: Burwell, Cambridgeshire
- Coordinates: 52°16′23″N 0°19′47″E
- Type: Agricultural and domestic history

The Burwell Museum (also known as Burwell Museum and Windmill) is located in Burwell, Cambridgeshire, England. The museum depicts life through the centuries on the edge of the Cambridgeshire Fens.

Opened in 1992, it is housed in a collection of different period and period style agricultural buildings. Some are reconstructed from other sites, such as the 18th century timber-framed barn, and others are built in the local style using mainly reclaimed materials, such as the wagon sheds/granary display area.

The displays are set out as 'scenes' (rather like stage sets) with many individual artefacts making each display, in order to give visitors a better idea of how, where and when items were used. Themes and exhibits include agriculture, period rooms and household items, military life, a blacksmith's shop, a reconstruction of a Roman potter's workshop, Victorian school room, vintage vehicles, carts and farm equipment

The museum is also welcoming to school trips and was used in 2012 to film a TV documentary about Cambridgeshire fen folklore, featuring eight local school children. Adult groups are also welcome.

The neighbouring Grade II* listed windmill, Stevens' Mill, is also part of the museum and can be visited when the museum is open.
