= Barham, Kent =

Village in Kent, England

Coordinates: 51.207°N 1.157°E

Barham
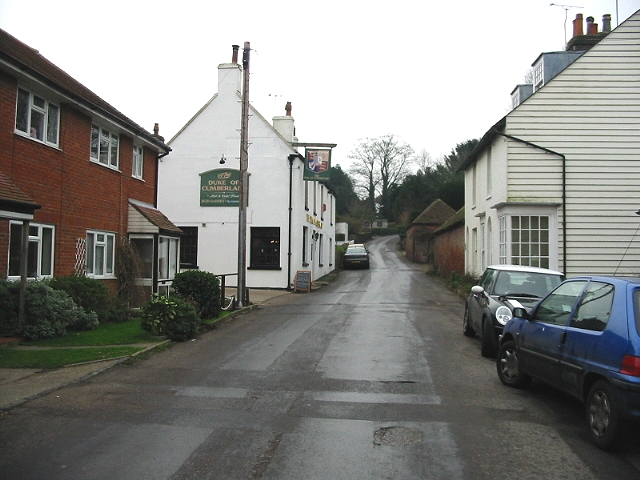
- Duke of Cumberland pub, Barham

- Location within Kent
- Area: 14.54 km^{2} (5.61 sq mi)
- Population: 1,355 (Civil Parish 2011)
  - Density: 93/km^{2} (240/sq mi)
- OS grid reference: TR206495
- Civil parish: Barham
- District: Canterbury
- Shire county: Kent
- Region: South East
- Country: England
- Sovereign state: United Kingdom
- Post town: CANTERBURY
- Postcode district: CT4
- Dialling code: 01227
- Police: Kent
- Fire: Kent
- Ambulance: South East Coast
- UK Parliament: Canterbury

Barham /ˈbærəm/ BARR-əm is a village and civil parish in the City of Canterbury district of Kent, England. Barham village is approximately 6 miles (10 km) south-east from Canterbury and 8 miles (13 km) north from Folkestone. The parish includes Heart's Delight. In 2011 the parish had a population of 1355.

== History ==
The name Barham was spelt Bioraham in 799, from Biora (derived from Beora, a Saxon chief) and Ham ("settlement" or "homestead").

Just outside Barham stood the Black Mill, a windmill which was accidentally burnt down in 1970. Barham Downs Golf Club (now defunct) was founded in 1890. The club disappeared following the First World War.

== Geography ==
The land of the village is a mostly rural and wooded right-angled triangle of land (irregular in shape) commencing with the A2 road between Canterbury and Dover on its north-east border, with its housing grouped among wooded hills and pasture of the village. Elevations range between 138 feet (42m) in the north to 427 feet (130 m) in the south-west. Barham Downs are wooded hills north-west of the village centre. The Nailbourne, a tributary of the Little Stour, rises in Lyminge and flows intermittently in line with the seasons and rainfall through the centre of the village.

To the south of Barham village is the residential area of Derringstone (conjoined to the village), and the hamlet of Breach at 1 mile (1.6 km) south. At the north of the parish is the hamlet of Out Elmstead.

== Community ==
Barham village has its own C of E primary school, and a shop, Post Office and village hall with bowls club attached. On The Street is the village green sports field, the Duke of Cumberland public house, and a care home. Parish Anglican religion is provided by the Church of St John the Baptist. Opposite the church on Church Lane is a farm complex, including barns for storage and services, which is the headquarters of a wine estate.

The tennis club, allotments, picnic area and playing fields are off Brickfield Lane. Another small play area is on Valley Road in the Derringstone direction.

At Breach, to the west of Elham Valley Road, is a vineyard with garden centre, pottery, and day care centre. To the east of the road are the light industrial, services and offices units of Barham Business Park.

Out Elmstead, the most residential of the three parish outliers in terms of the anciently named hamlets, contains a farm nursery. Access to the hamlet from the village is either from Valley Road, part of the main north–south road through the parish, or from the northbound side of the A2 which runs at the east of the parish.

At the southeast of the parish is Barham Crematorium, which opened in 1956.

Barham parish is part of the Barham Downs electoral ward, which stretches north to Adisham, and has a total population taken at the 2011 Census of 2,797.

== Landmarks ==
Broome Park, at the southeast of the parish, is a Grade I listed building dating to the 17th century; its park and gardens, occupying approximately one-sixth of parish land, are Grade II listed in the initial category of the national grading system.

The Church of St John the Baptist is on Church Lane on the eastern hillside of the village. Built in the 14th century, it has a green copper spire and has been partially remodelled inside.

Out Elmstead has eight listed buildings.

== Notable people ==
- David Starkey (1945–), historian
- Field Marshal Horatio Herbert Kitchener, 1st Earl Kitchener, Field Marshal, diplomat and statesman, lived the last few years of his life at Broome Park. His name appears on the war memorial in the porch of the parish church.
- Reginald Fitz Urse – Knight to Henry II of England and one of four assassins of Thomas Becket.
