= Stour watermills =

Watermills on the River Stour in Kent, England

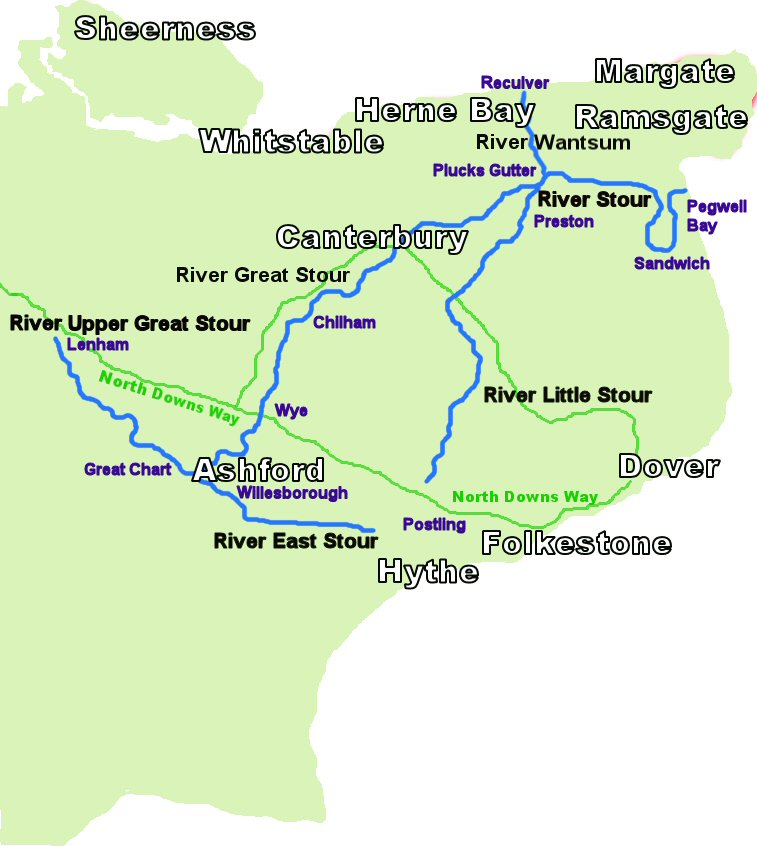
River Stour and tributaries

The River Stour has been used for centuries as a source of power. Many different processes were performed by the use of water power:- Corn milling, fulling, paper making and electricity generation. Many of the mills survive today as house conversions, with two of them still working commercially.

== Upper Great Stour ==
The upper reaches of the Great Stour powered eight watermills, with a further two on tributaries.

=== Chapel Mill, Lenham ===
TQ 903 503 51°13′12″N 0°43′26″E

This corn mill in Lenham is the only one that was powered by the Upper Great Stour, the other watermills in Lenham were powered by the River Len. The mill building has been converted to residential use, devoid of machinery. It had a breast shot waterwheel.

=== Bowley Mill, Boughton Malherbe ===
TQ 902 496 51°12′50″N 0°43′19″E

This corn mill in Boughton Malherbe is now a derelict ruin, with the remains of the ground floor, waterwheel and some machinery remaining. The waterwheel was overshot, some 12 feet (3.66 m) diameter and 6 feet (1.83 m) wide, carried on a 8 inches (200 mm) diameter cast-iron axle. The Pit Wheel is of cast iron, and had 96 cogs. The Upright Shaft was wood, as was the clasp arm Great Spur Wheel, which drove three pairs of millstones. The mill building was 30 feet (9.14 m) by 15 feet (4.57 m) in plan, and new machinery was installed in 1881. The upper floors of the mill were pulled down in the 1960s as they had become unsafe.

=== Burnt Mill, Charing ===
TQ 913 492 51°12′36″N 0°44′10″E

This corn mill at Charing still remains in a derelict condition, with most of its machinery intact. The mill was working until the mid-1950s. The cast-iron waterwheel was 10 feet 4 inches (3.15 m) diameter and 5 feet (1.52 m) wide, on a 9 inches (230 mm) cast-iron axle. It bears the legend J HILL, ASHFORD, 1863. The pit wheel is 8 feet (2.44 m) diameter with 80 cogs, driving a cast-iron Wallower carried on the upright shaft and driving a 6 feet (1.83 m) diameter Great Spur Wheel which drove three pairs of millstones. A Crown Wheel drove two lineshafts. The mill was run by the Tanton family for many years. A John Tanton was the miller in 1764, and another John Tanton died in 1837 aged 72.

=== Field Mill, Charing ===
TQ 915 483 51°12′07″N 0°44′24″E

This corn mill at Charing still stands, retaining a little machinery. The overshot waterwheel was 10 feet 6 inches (3.20 m) diameter and 5 feet (1.52 m) wide. It bears the legend HILL & SON ASHFORD 1877. The waterwheel is carried on a 11-inch-diameter (280 mm) cast-iron axle, driving a cast-iron Pit Wheel. All other machinery has been removed. The mill had two pairs of millstones. Millers were a Mr Pay and Mr Pope from 1878 - 1892, and Walter Hicks in 1892, having previously been at the windmill.

=== Swallow Mill, Little Chart ===
TQ 934 469 51°11′20″N 0°45′58″E

This corn mill at Little Chart had an internal waterwheel. The millers in the 1850s and 1860s were the Large family.

=== Ford Mill, Little Chart ===
TQ 943 459 51°10′44″N 0°46′44″E

This was a paper mill. It was in use as a paper mill as early as 1776 and took its name from the ford which was near the mill. This was replaced by a bridge in 1836. George Langley ran the mill from the 1840s until 1876. The mill was owned by the Dering Estate at Pluckley. The overshot waterwheel was replaced by a turbine. In 1941, the mill was switched to the manufacture of flong for the Daily Express newspaper. Changing economic conditions meant that flong manufacture ceased in 1986.

=== Worten Mill, Godinton ===
TQ 970 435 51°09′25″N 0°48′58″E

The mill at Godinton was a corn mill. The building survives, converted to residential use and was the former home of Victor Ross, chairman of Reader's Digest. This is one of the oldest mills in Kent, recorded in a charter in 762, and is Grade II listed. The waterwheel, although in a poor state of repair, is still in the building.

=== Buxford Mill, Great Chart ===
TQ 989 426 51°08′53″N 0°50′31″E

Buxford Mill ceased operating as a corn mill after the war and was changed to residential use before several attempts at making it a restaurant and hotel failed. The house was derelict for some time before it ultimately settled as a domestic residence. The house now standing was built in 1600 with numerous additions but the waterwheel and all mill workings have now gone. There is still a waterfall and sluice adjacent to the house but old maps suggest that the wheel was located inside the current granary and there is evidence of an outflow emerging from underneath the building, that has now been largely filled in. It is likely that the wheel was either breast-shot or under-shot given the relatively small fall of approximately 6 feet.

=== Tributaries of the Upper Great Stour ===
==== Hothfield (Potters Corner) Mill ====
TQ 989 450 51°10′12″N 0°50′38″E

The corn mill to the north of Hothfield still retains most of its machinery. It stood on a stream which feeds into the Great Stour. The cast-iron overshot waterwheel is 11 feet (3.35 m) diameter and 7 feet 6 inches (2.29 m) wide, carried on a 7 inches (180 mm) square cast-iron axle, driving a cast-iron Pit Wheel with 88 cogs. This drove a cast-iron wallower carried on a 6.5 inches (170 mm) square cast-iron Upright Shaft, which also carried a 6-foot-10-inch-diameter (2.08 m) Great Spur Wheel which originally drove four pairs of millstones and latterly drove two pairs.

==== Westwell Mill ====
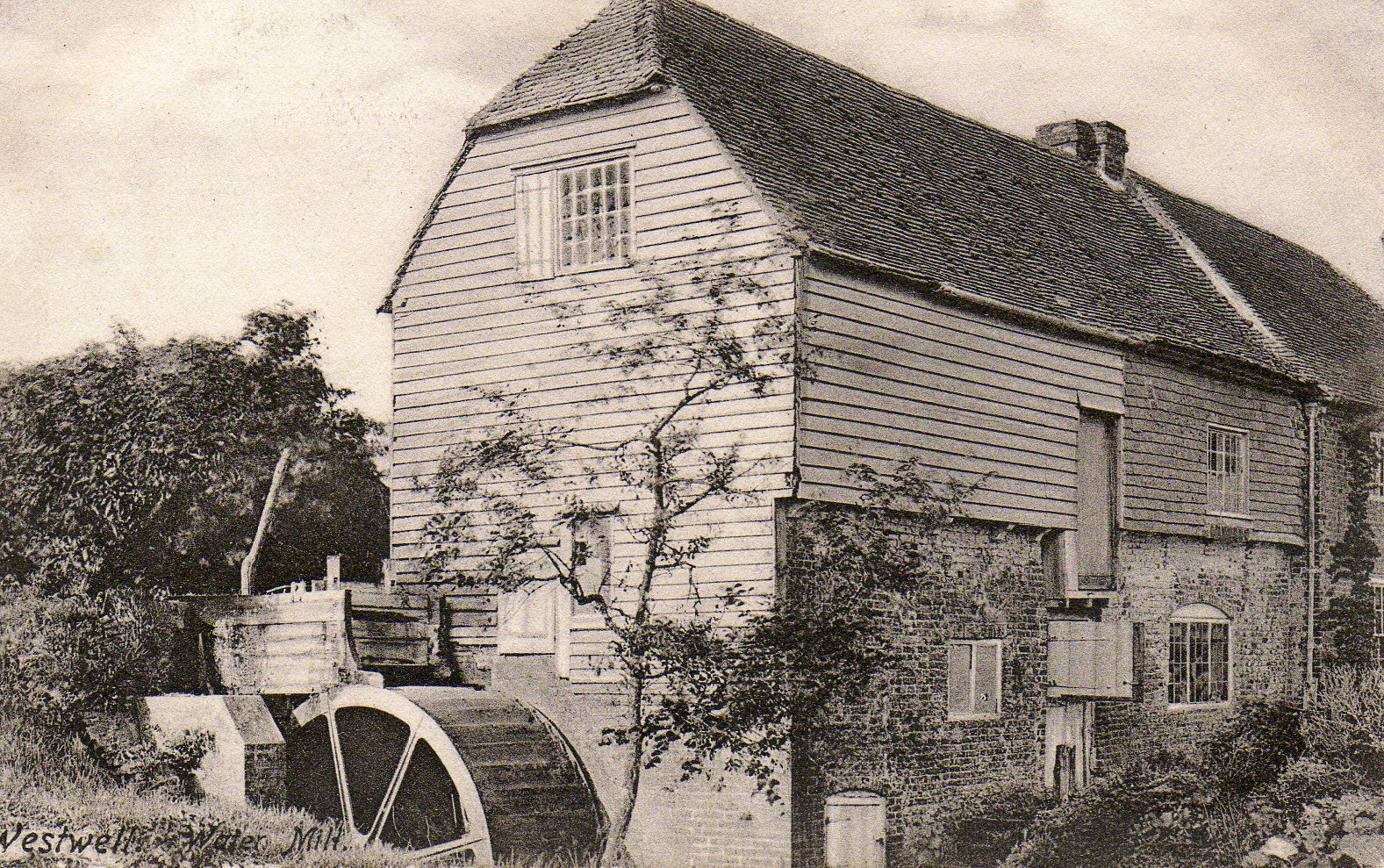
The mill c1903

TQ 992 474 51°11′28″N 0°50′56″E This corn mill at Westwell has been converted to residential use, retaining its overshot waterwheel.

== East Stour ==
The East Stour powered four watermills.

=== Evegate Mill, Smeeth ===
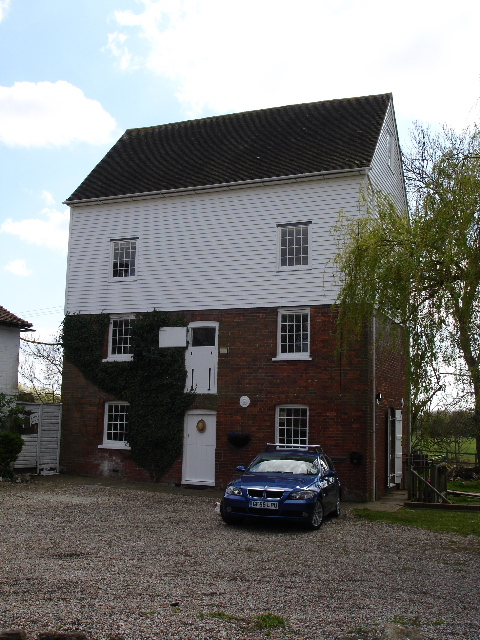
Evegate mill

TR 063 380 51°06′14″N 0°56′42″E

=== Hanover Mill, Mersham ===
TR 049 391 51°06′54″N 0°55′34″E

The corn mill at Mersham is still engaged in the milling trade, owned by T Denne and Sons.

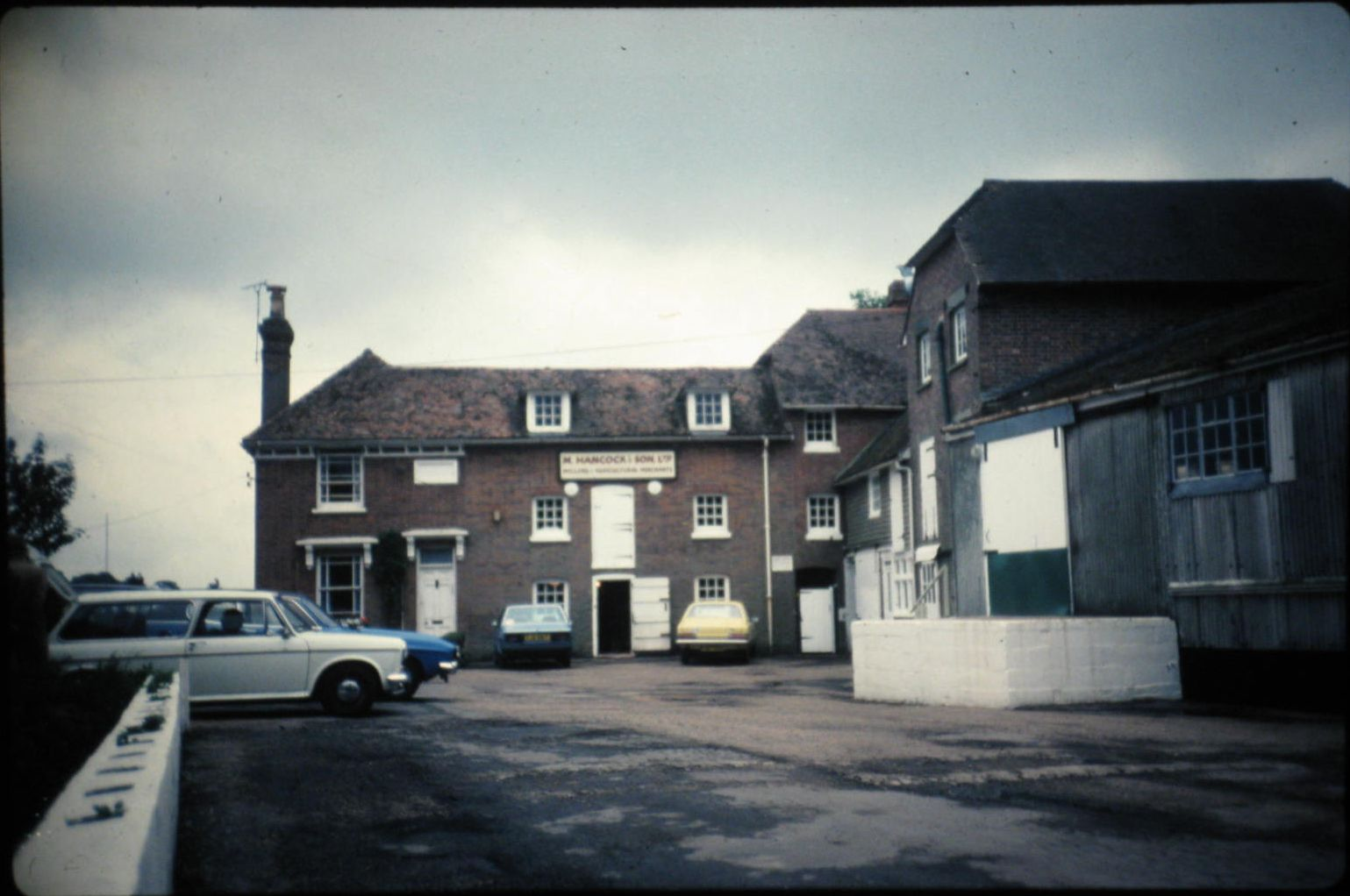
Hanover Mill, Mersham, 1982

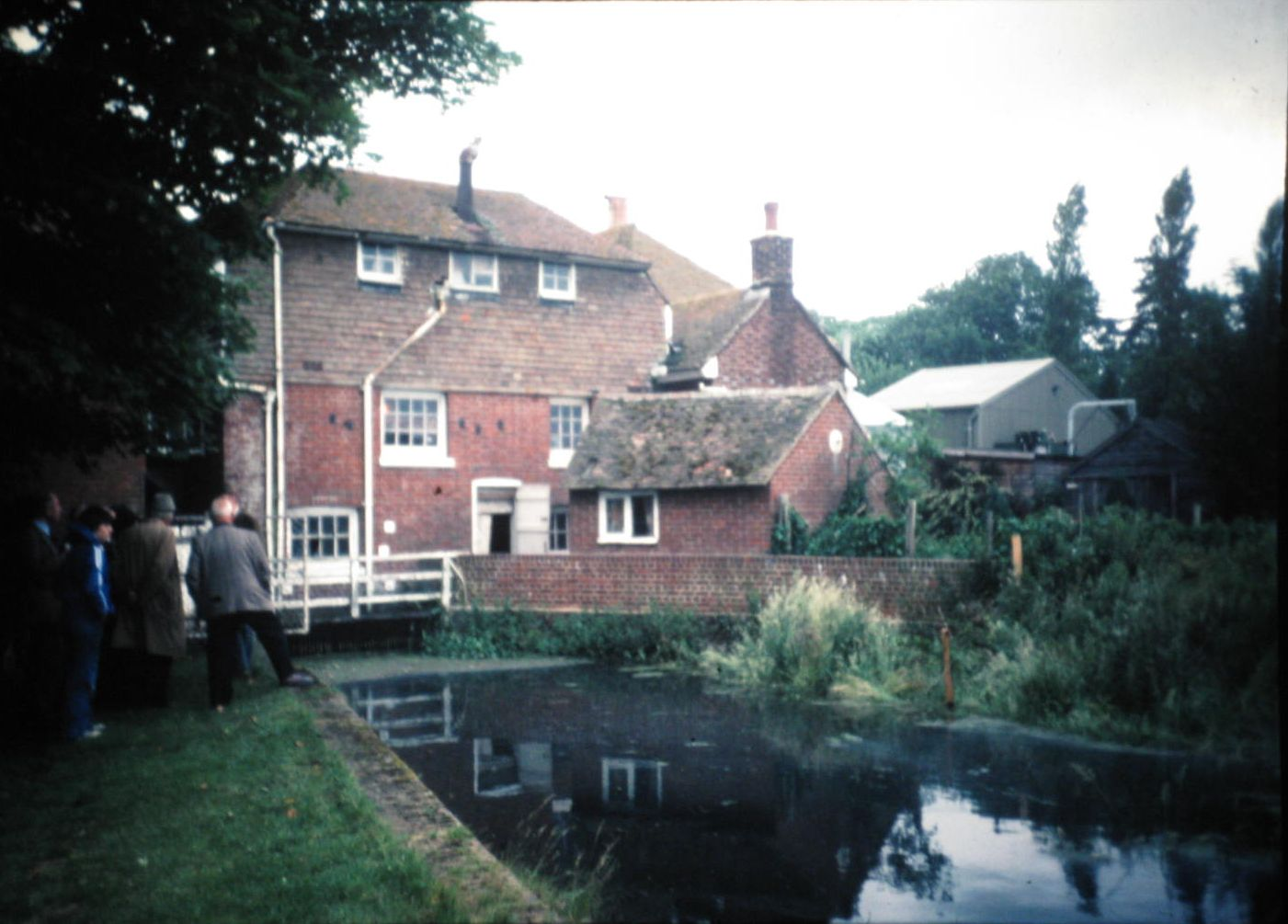
Hanover Mill viewed from upstream

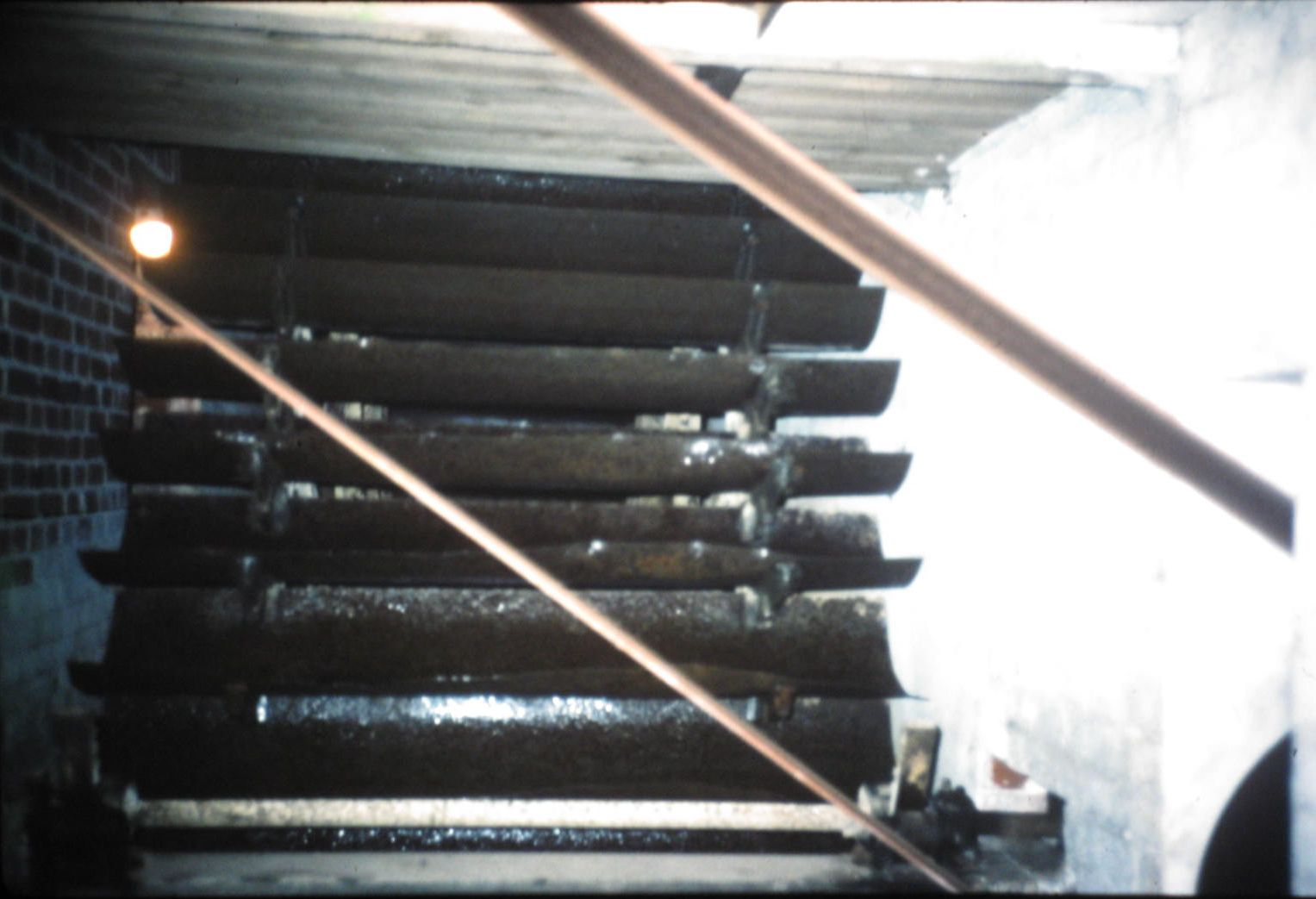
Waterwheel from front

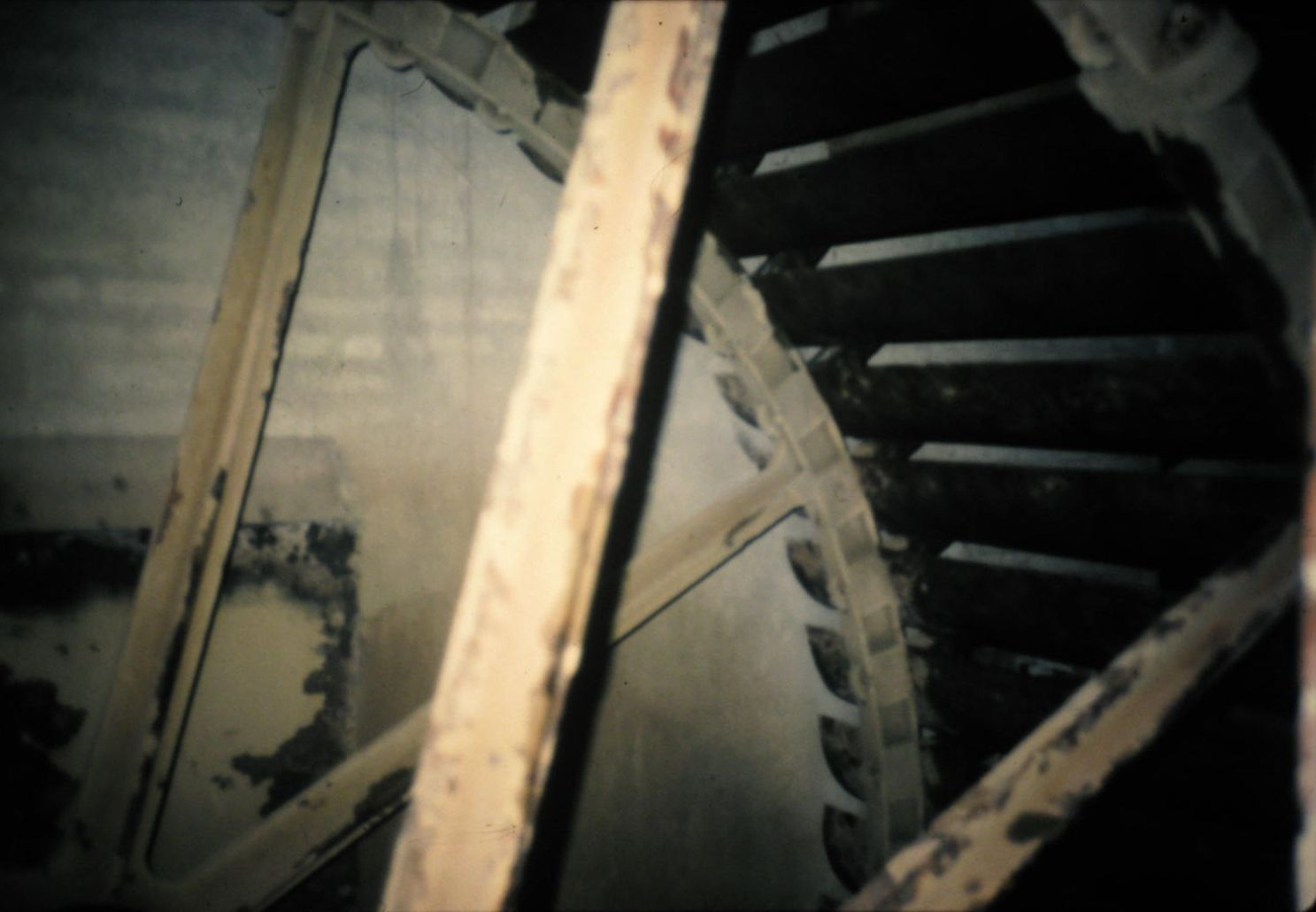
Waterwheel from side

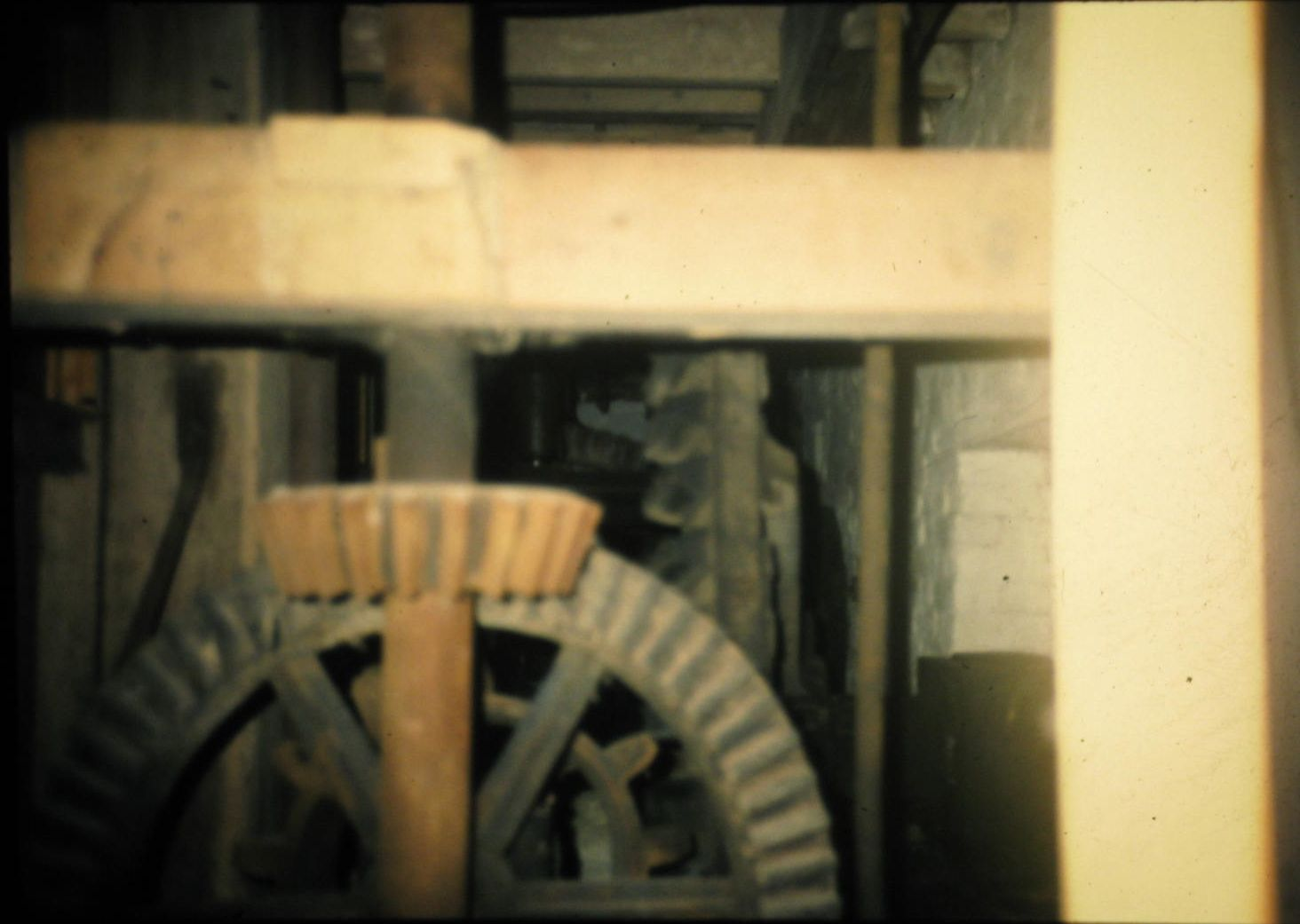
The cog pit

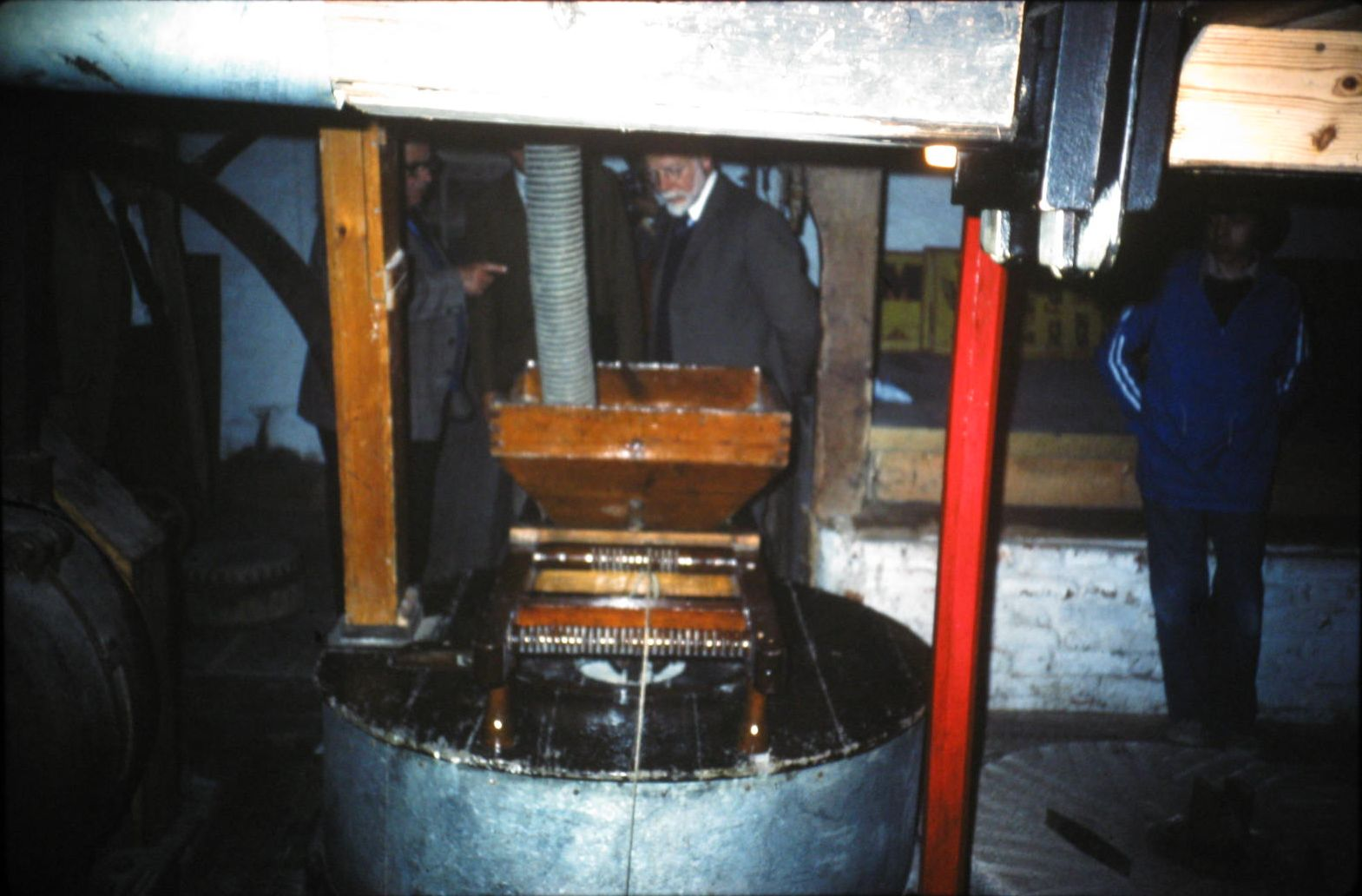
The stone floor

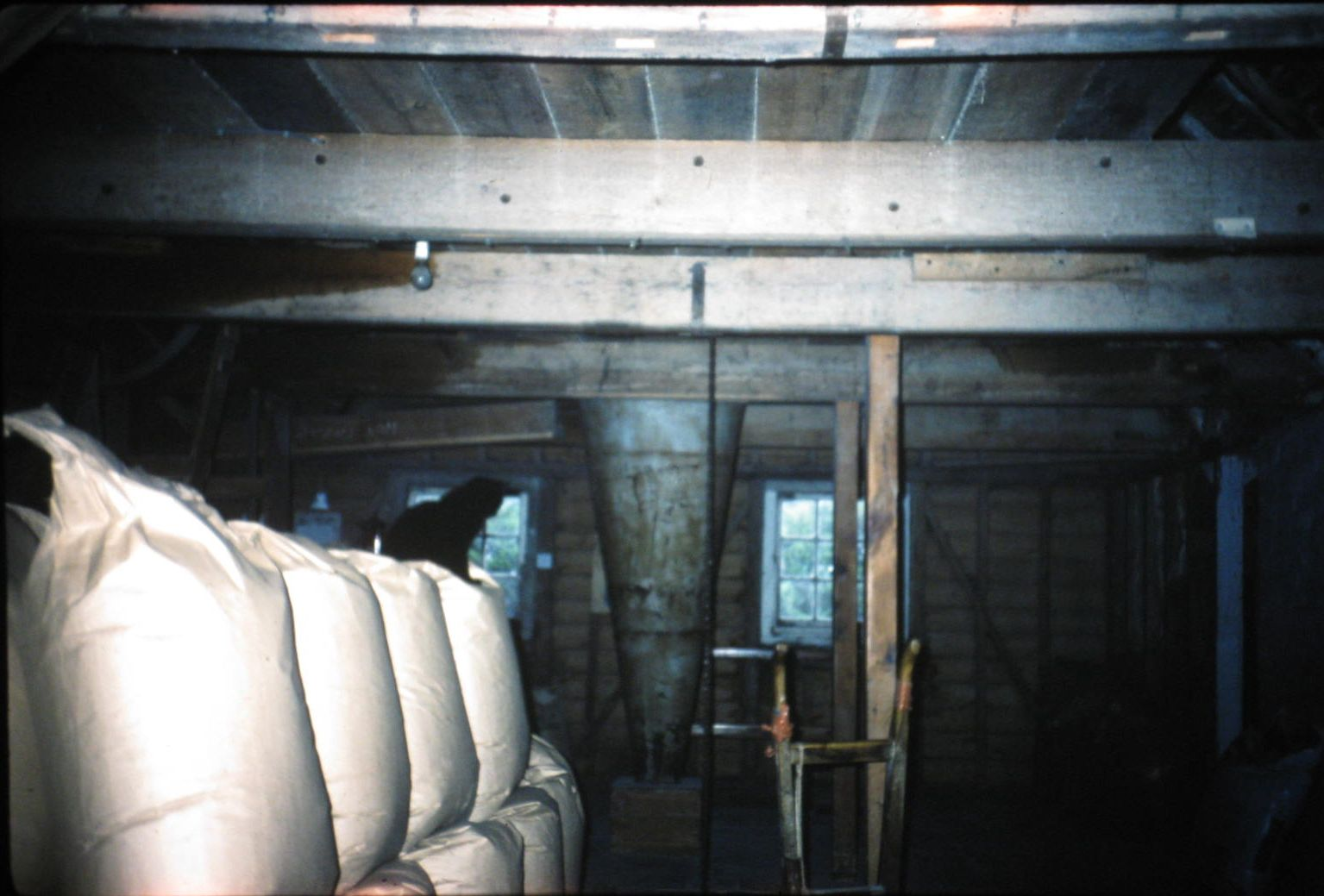
The bin floor

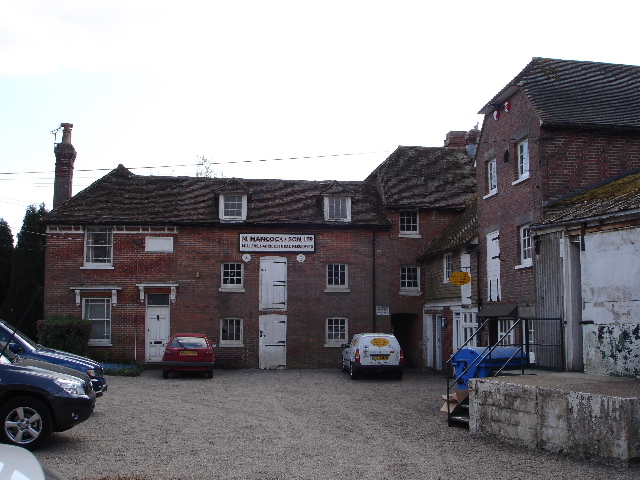
Hanover Mill, Mersham, 2007

=== Swanton Mill, Mersham ===
TR 039 388 51°06′43″N 0°54′43″E

This corn mill still retains its machinery. The overshot waterwheel is 8 feet 4 inches (2.54 m) wide and 6 feet 8 inches (2.03 m) diameter, driving the machinery via a cast-iron ring gear with 72 teeth. There were originally four pairs of millstones, of which two remain, driven by a system of belts and pulleys. This dates from the 1840s, when the mill was reworked by Messrs. Holman's of Canterbury. There was a twin cylinder self-condensing steam engine by Hall's of Dartford, built in 1840 which provided auxiliary power. This was dismantled and donated to the Newcomen Society in 1920. The original intention was that this would be displayed in the Science Museum, but it later passed to the Henry Ford Museum in America.

=== Sevington Mill, Willesborough ===
TR 032 415 51°08′13″N 0°54′11″E

Sevington mill was a corn mill which had two overshot wheels driving a total of five pairs of millstones. The mill was refitted in 1852. It burnt down and was a ruin by 1939.

=== Tributaries of the East Stour ===
A stream rises above Stowting and flows inte the East Stour above Evegate Mill. It powered a watermill.

==== Stowting Mill ====
TR 124 418 51°08′10″N 1°02′06″E
This millstones in the watermill were driven overdrift.

== Great Stour ==
The Great Stour powered sixteen watermills, with another on the Kennington Stream.

=== East Hill Mill, Ashford ===
TR 015 427 51°08′53″N 0°52′48″E

This water and steam mill was a corn mill, one of those run by H.S. Pledge & Sons Ltd. The converted building survives, used as a nightclub until 2014, with a dummy waterwheel outside. It was the only watermill in Ashford, which was well supplied with windmills and steam mills.

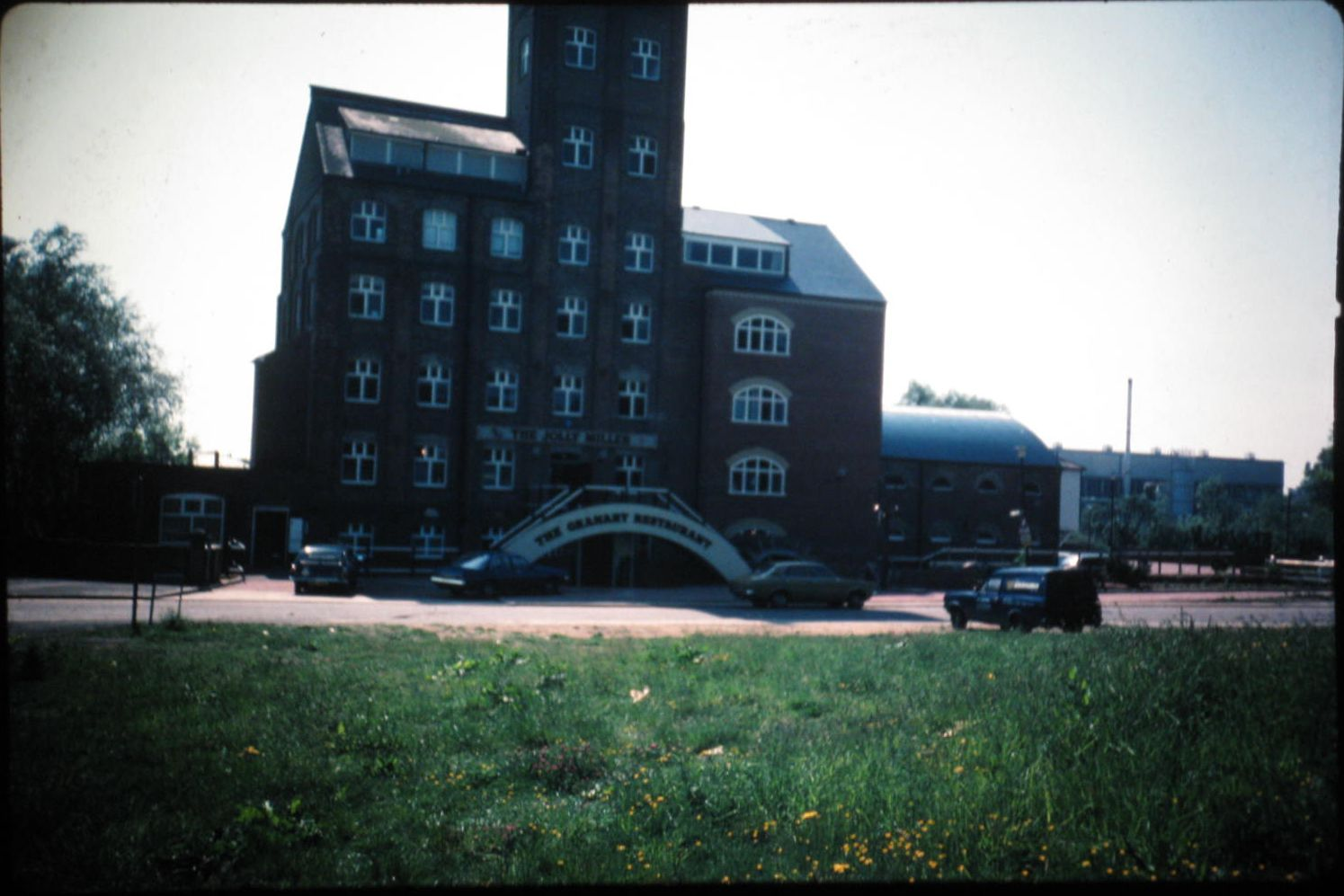
East Hill Mill, 1982

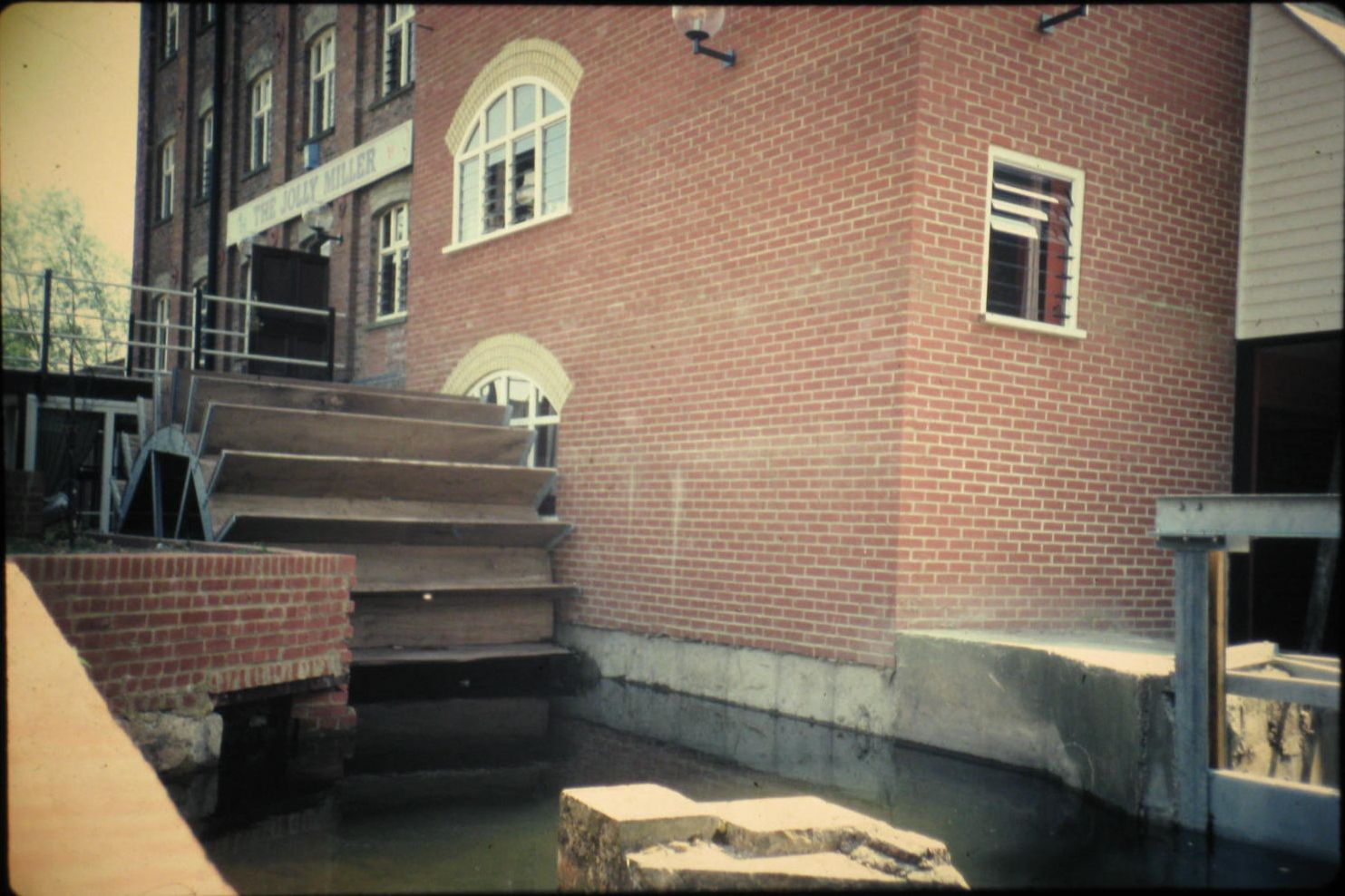
Reproduction waterwheel.

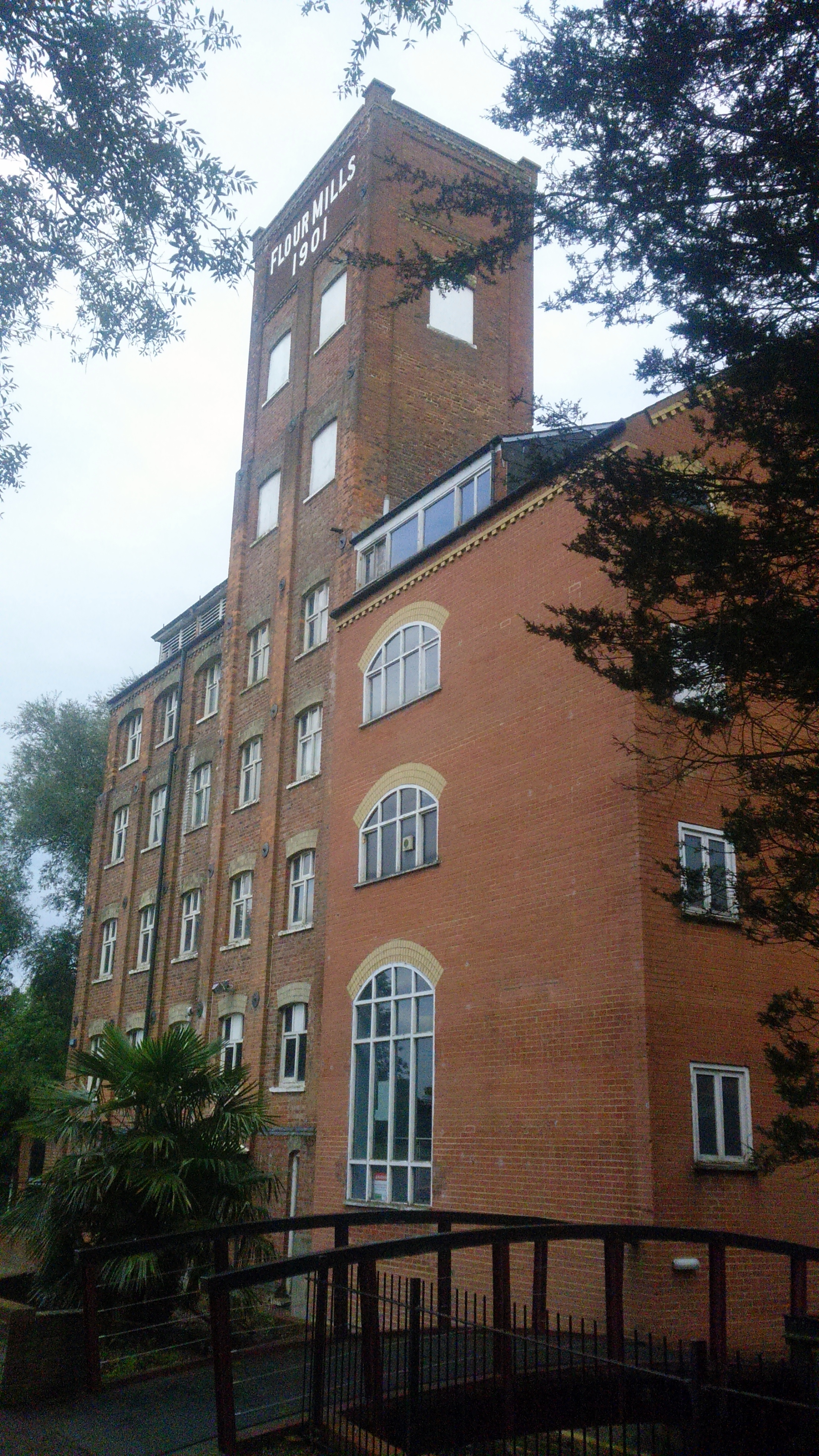
East Hill Mill, 2015

=== Wye Mill ===
TR 049 469 51°11′04″N 0°55′49″E

The mill at Wye was run for many years by the Denne family. The building survives today having been extensively restored around 2000.

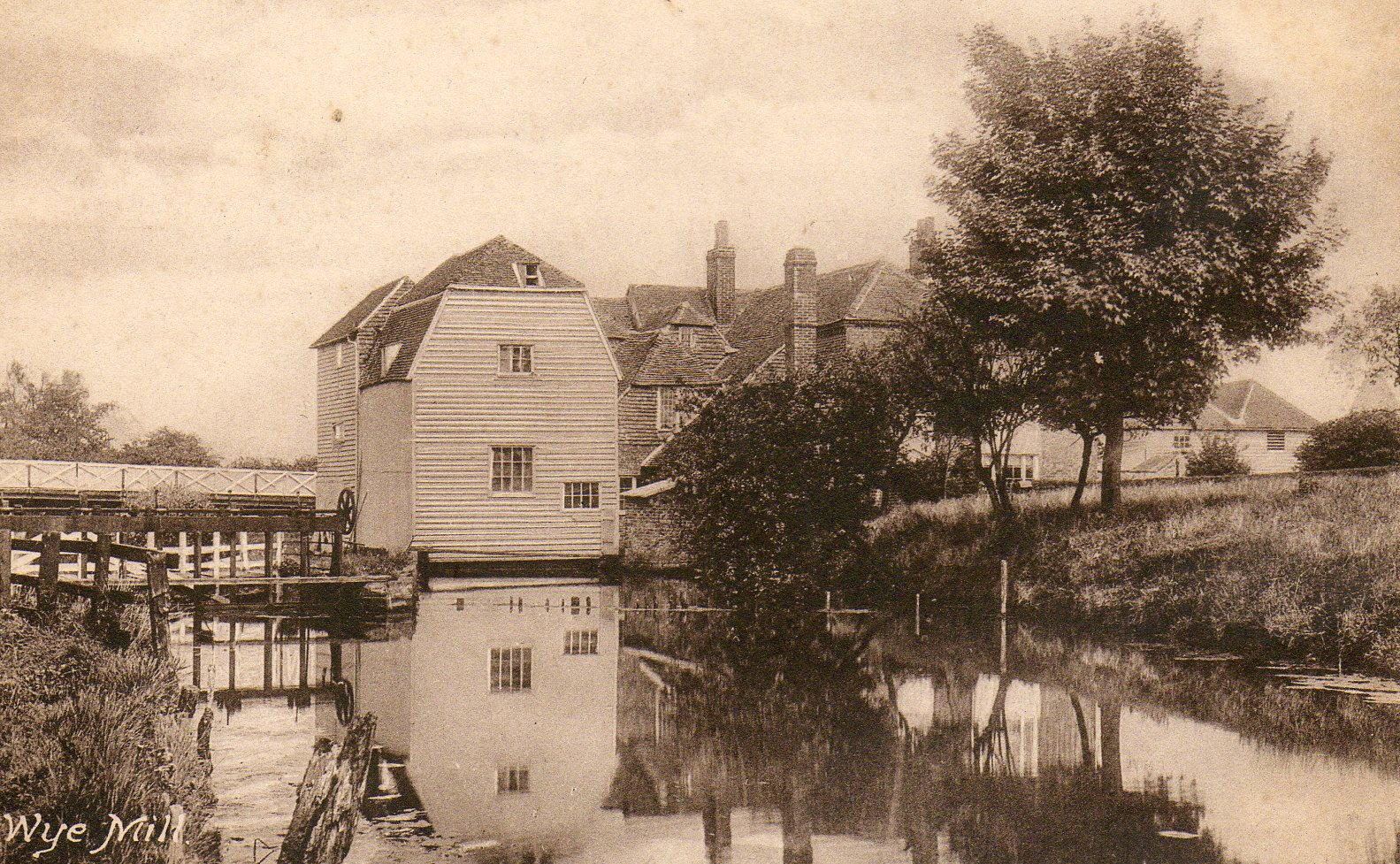
Wye watermill c1910

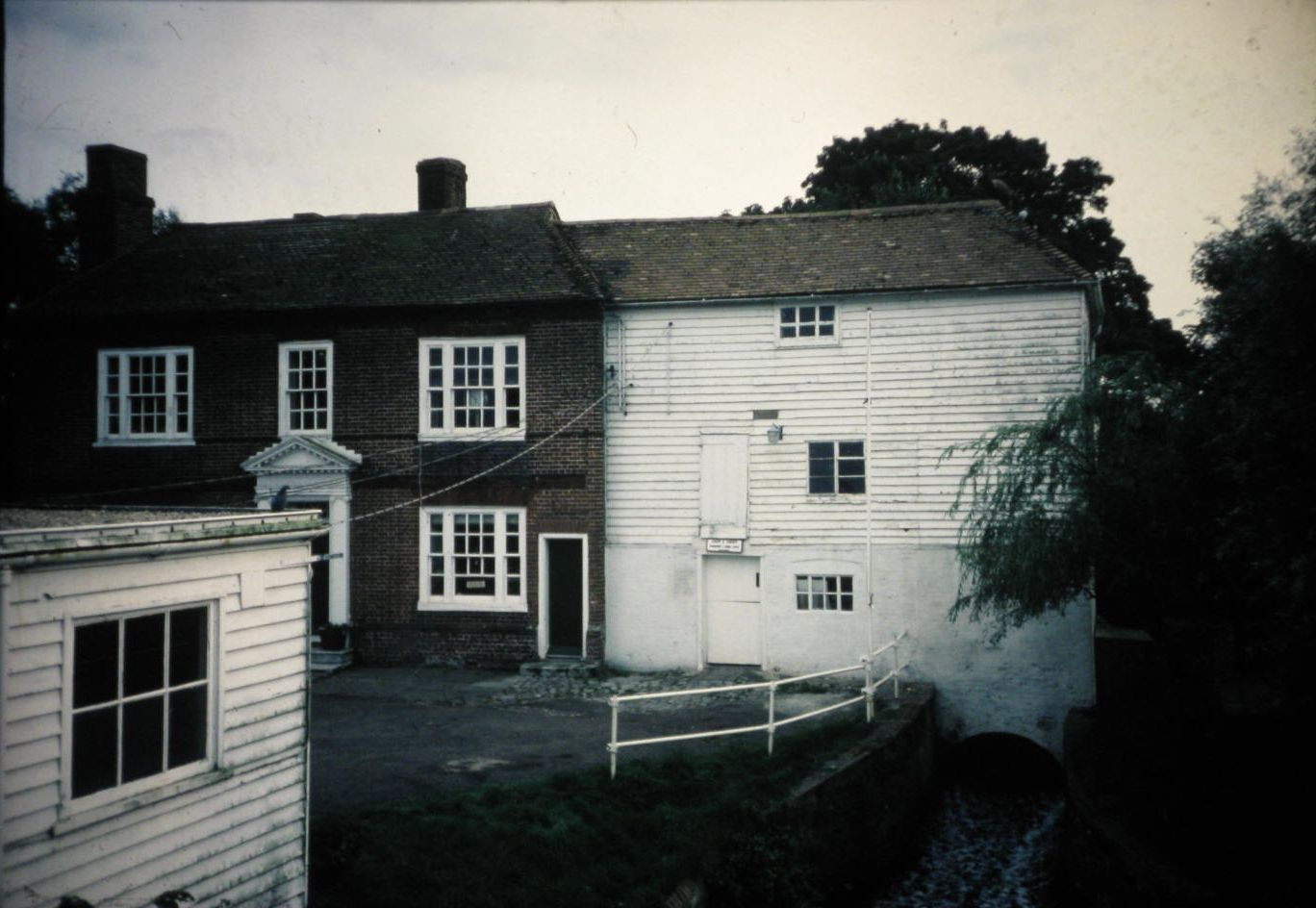
Wye mill in 1982

=== Chilham Mill ===
TR 078 534 51°14′31″N 0°58′34″E

The large corn mill at Chilham is the best preserved on the River Stour. The waterwheel is 14 feet 6 inches (4.42 m) diameter and 7 feet 10 inches (2.39 m) wide, carried on a + section cast-iron axle of a nominal 20 inches (510 mm) diameter. This also carried a cast-iron Pit Wheel 10 feet 8 inches (3.25 m) diameter with 96 cogs driving a Wallower with 34 teeth on a cast-iron Upright Shaft carrying a cast-iron Great Spur Wheel with 114 cogs. This drove six pairs of millstones, originally all underdrift, but one of the Stone Nuts has been adapted to drive a vertical shaft which powered auxiliary machinery and drove the sixth pair of stones overdrift by belt and pulley.

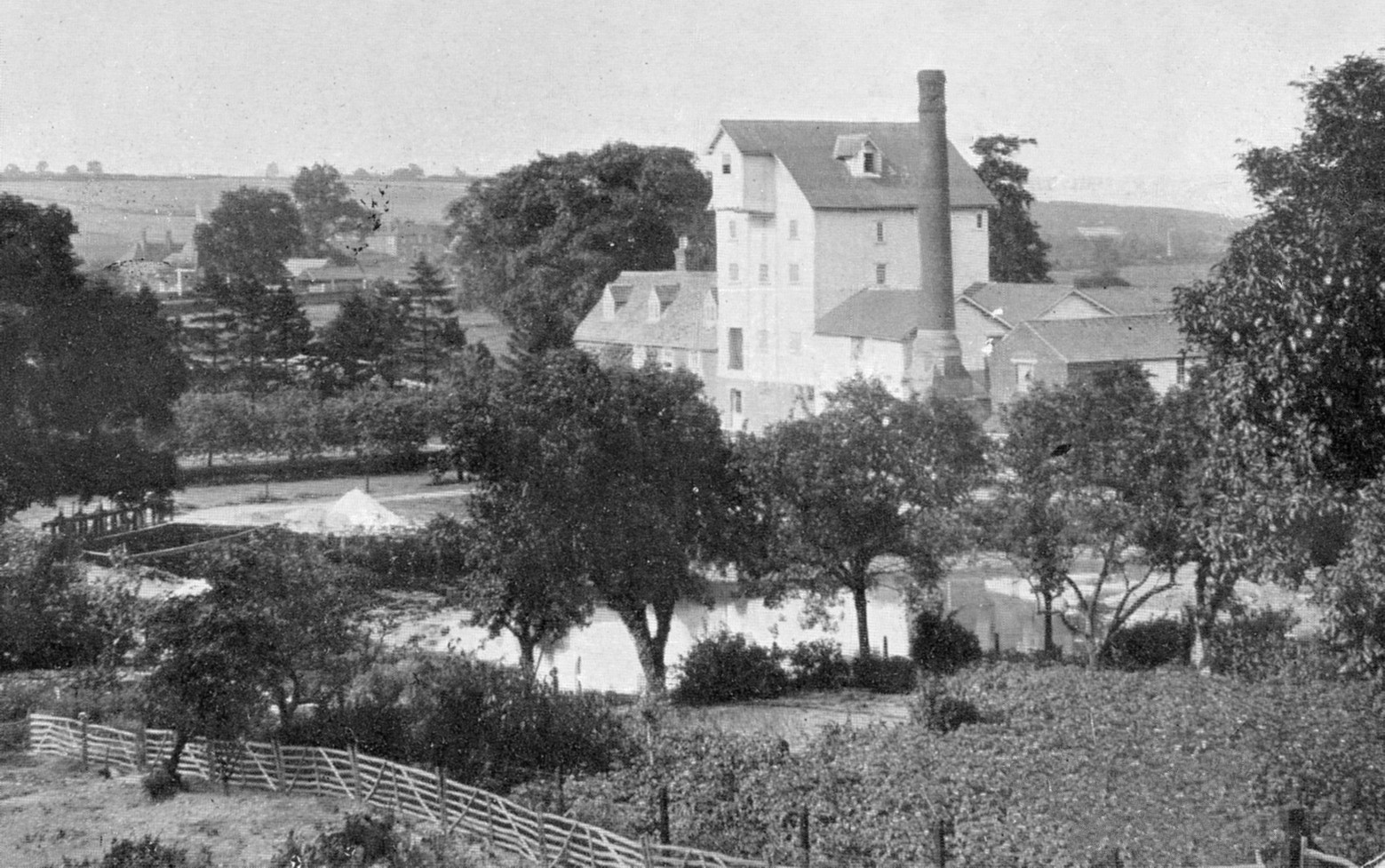
The mill c1906

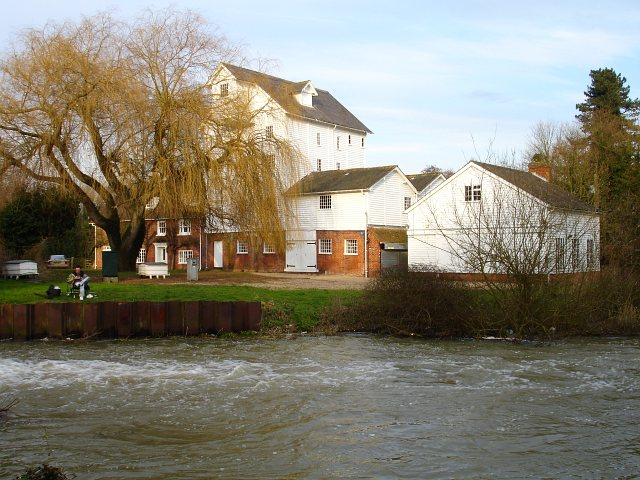
Chilham mill today

=== Chartham Corn Mill ===
TR 097 554 51°15′32″N 1°00′14″E

The building of this corn mill at Chartham survives converted to residential use and devoid of machinery. It was powered by a low breast shot waterwheel some 10 feet (3.05 m) wide. There was also a turbine some 4 feet (1.22 m) in diameter which drove a pump.

=== Chartham Paper Mill ===
TR 108 549 51°15′14″N 1°01′12″E

This mill is a Domesday mill. There was a fulling mill in 1438 and paper production started circa 1730. Tracing paper was discovered here after a worker accidentally added too much starch to the mixture. The paper mill is still working commercially, producing tracing paper to this day. It is owned by Arjo Wiggins.

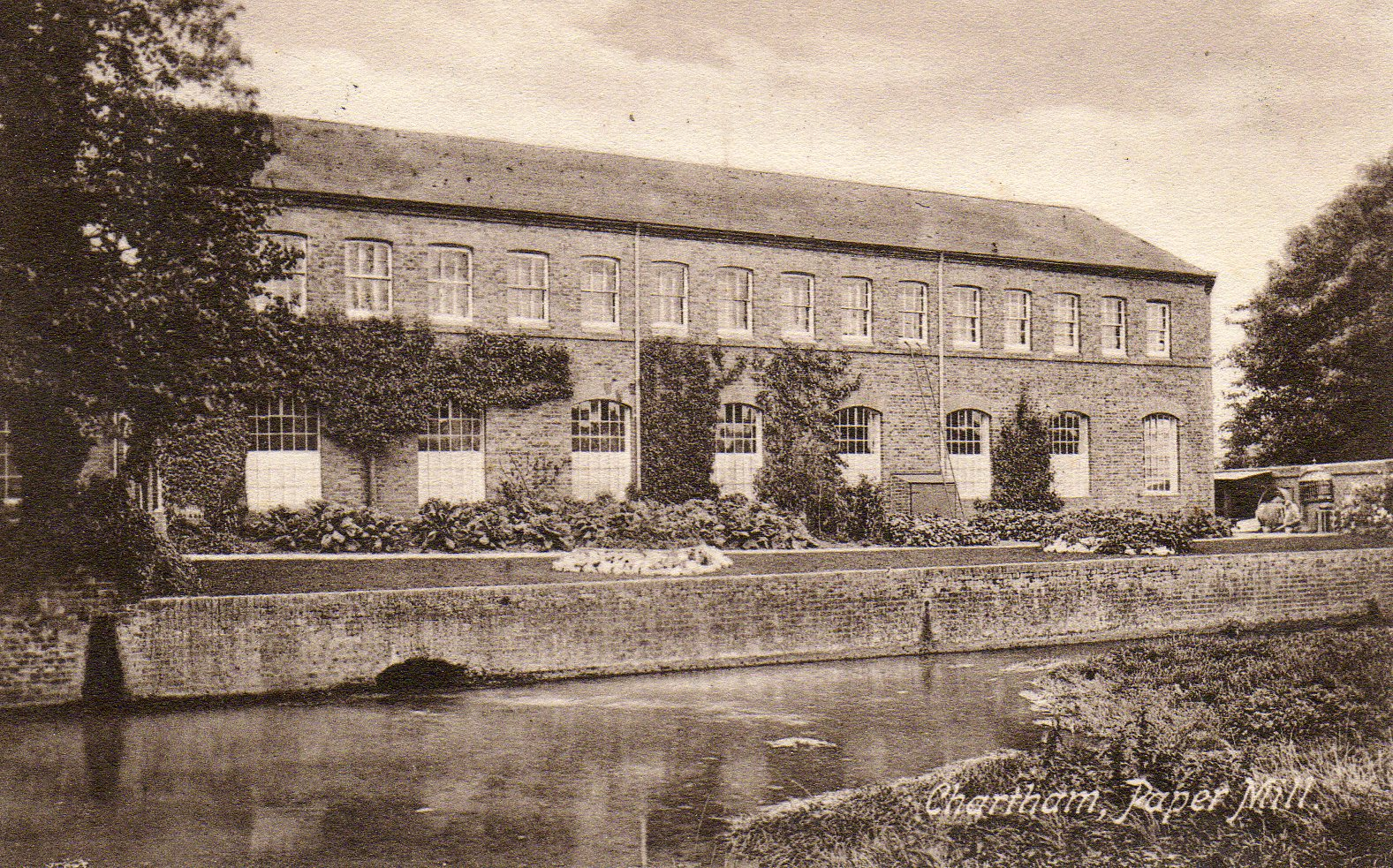
c1908

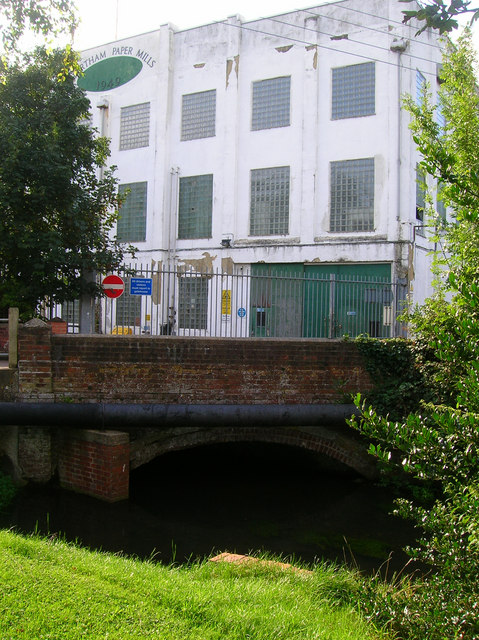
The mill today

=== Cock Mill, Canterbury ===
TR 145 580 51°16′52″N 1°04′26″E

The River Stour bifurcates through Canterbury, the western stream powered two watermills and the eastern stream powered eight.

Cock Mill was a small mill with a single waterwheel. It was demolished in the 19th century.

=== Dean's (Westgate, Shafford's, Hooker's) Mill, Canterbury ===
TR 148 583 51°16′59″N 1°04′44″E

This was a corn mill. The mill was rebuilt circa 1790 and had two internal waterwheels driving eight pairs of stones. The mill was bought by William Hooker in the 1890s and was renamed Westgate mill. The mill burnt down in June 1954.

=== Barton Mill, Canterbury ===
TR 156 588 51°17′17″N 1°05′28″E

The following mills are those on the eastern stream of the River Stour in Canterbury.

This was the last watermill in Canterbury that was working for trade. For many years it was a paper mill, and then a corn mill. There were two waterwheels driving the millstones, and probably another waterwheel which drove other machinery. The millstones were latterly replaced by roller mills. There was a fire in 1951, after which the mill was modernised, and another fire in July 2004 meant the end of milling at Barton mill. Some of the buildings survive, converted to residential use.

=== St. Mildred's Mill, Canterbury ===
This corn mill stood within the city walls, and disappeared in mediaeval times.

=== St. Mildred's Tannery, Canterbury ===
The tannery in Canterbury occupies a very old site, even older than the cathedral. The current firm was established in 1878 by Joseph and Samuel Conolly. Leather from the tannery was of the highest quality, and has been used in the coronation coach of King Edward VII, Rolls-Royces, Concorde, the QE2, Ferraris, and the Houses of Parliament. The tannery buildings are now converted to residential use.

=== Mead Mill, Canterbury ===
Little is known of this mill, which disappeared centuries ago.

=== King's Mill, Canterbury ===
TR 148 580 51°16′52″N 1°04′44″E

This corn mill stood on an ancient mill site. The mill was granted to St Augustine's Abbey by King Stephen in 1144. In 1174 it was repossessed by the Crown, and granted to Rohesia, the sister of Thomas Becket. The mill stood opposite The Weavers House, and marks in the brickwork show where the waterwheel was.

=== Abbott's (City, Denne's) Mill, Canterbury ===
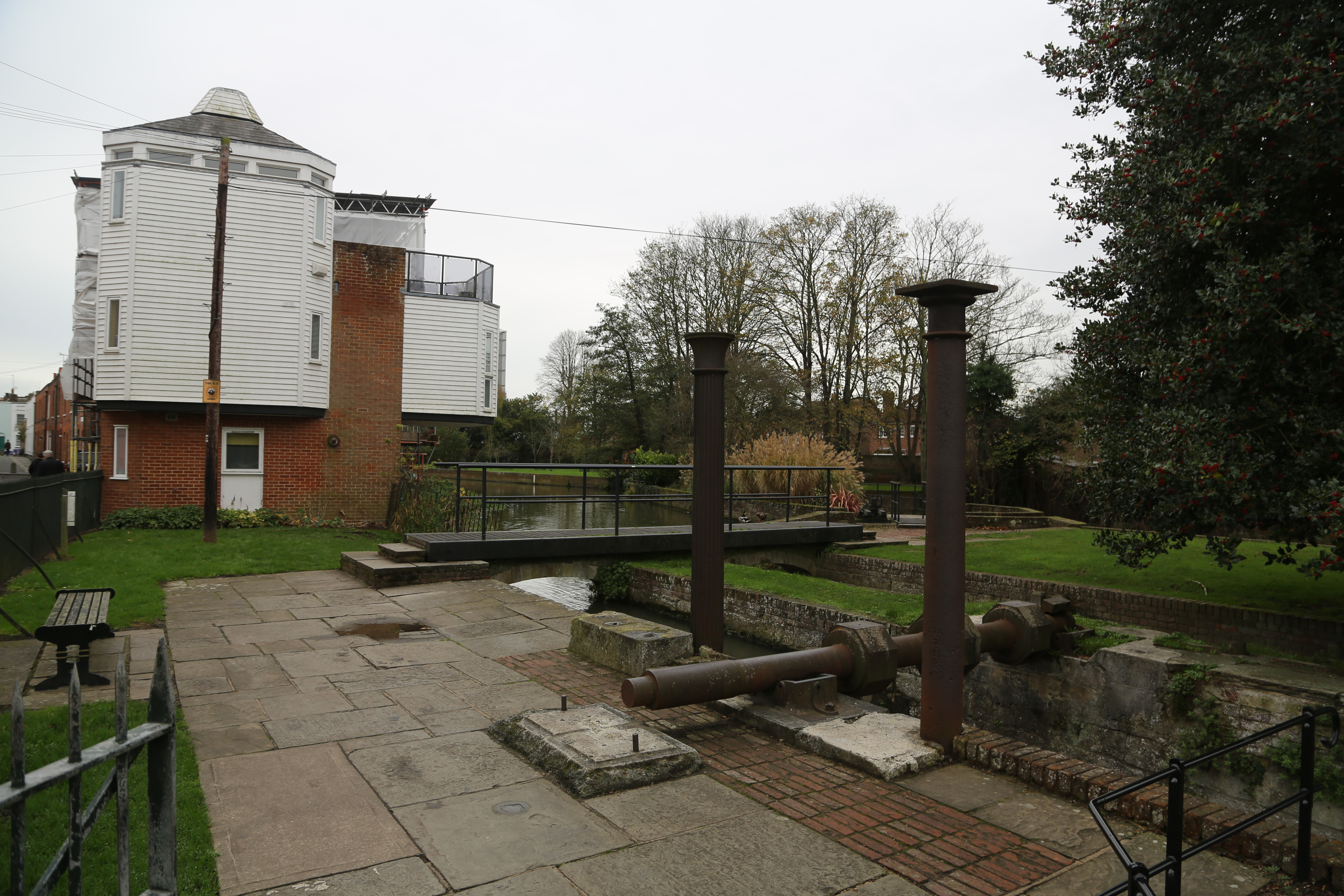
The remains of the mill

TR 148 582 51°16′55″N 1°04′44″E

This corn mill stood on the site of a medieval mill owned by the Abbot. The building dated from 1792 and was originally designed as a granary by John Smeaton. In 1794 it was converted into a watermill by Joseph Royle and James Simmons. The building was 60 feet (18.29 m) square in plan, and six storeys tall. The base was brick and the upper five storeys were wood, clad in white painted weatherboarding. At the time it was built, it was the second tallest building in Canterbury, after the Cathedral. There were two waterwheels each 12 feet (3.66 m) diameter and 6 feet (1.83 m) diameter driving a total of eight pairs of stones. In 1896 it was bought by Denne's. The mill was destroyed by fire on 17 October 1933. The cast-iron axle survives on site.

=== Black Mill, Sturry ===
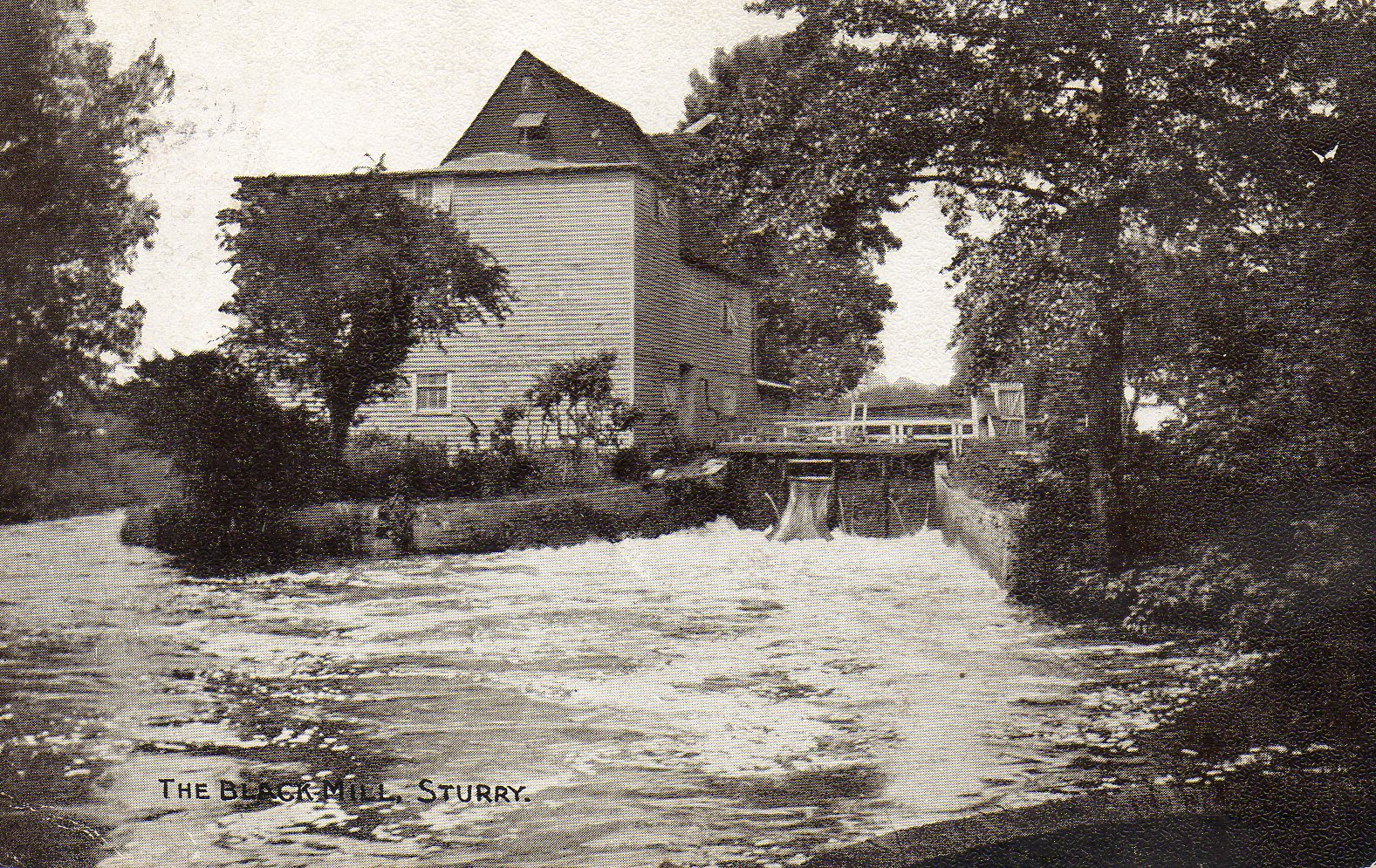
The Black Mill, c1920

Sturry had two watermills, neither of which survive today.

=== White Mill, Sturry ===
TR 175 600 51°17′53″N 1°07′05″E

This corn mill has been demolished, with only scant remains of the machinery remaining. There is a turbine of some 4 feet (1.22 m) diameter, and a low breast shot waterwheel 14 feet 10 inches (4.52 m) diameter and 7 feet 2 inches (2.18 m) wide.

=== Tributaries of Great Stour ===
==== Kennington Mills ====
TR 032 454 51°10′19″N 0°54′18″E

The mills at Kennington were powered by wind, steam and water. The windmill was built in 1813 by Messrs. Hill, the Ashford millwrights. The millers in 1886 were Messrs. Pledge, who had several mills in the Ashford area. In 1892 Charles Stanley took the mills. The sails from the windmill were taken to Pluckley windmill when Kennington mills closed. The windmill was an empty shell by the 1930s and was demolished in 1952. The windmill was connected by a footbridge to the watermill building and the steam mill building was attached to the windmill base, which survives today. The watermill was powered by the Kennington Stream.

== Little Stour ==
The Little Stour powered four watermills.

=== Littlebourne (Hovis, Jarvis, White) Mill ===
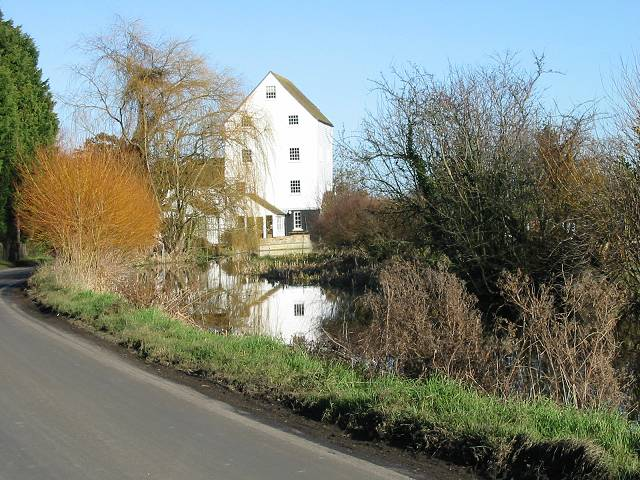
Littlebourne mill

TR 214 581 51°16′44″N 1°10′23″E

Littlebourne mill was a corn mill with a breastshot waterwheel. The building survives, converted to residential use. The mill was standing in 1803, when it was leased to William White. In 1820, a 12-foot-6-inch-diameter (3.81 m) by 5-foot-7-inch-wide (1.70 m) waterwheel was installed for Mr Kingsford, replacing a smaller waterwheel. The mill was being run by William Halliday in 1851. In 1894, Messrs Holman Bros, millwrights of Canterbury, quoted £45.10.0 for a new iron waterwheel and pit wheel, or £36.0.0 for a new wooden one. The mill was owned by Mr Jarvis in 1944, in which year it was sold to Vitovis Ltd. In 1945, the mill was modernised by the fitting of roller milling machinery and converting the whole to be powered by electricity. A large sign on the mill advertised Hovis flour. The mill was later sold to Gardener & Sons of Birchington but had closed by 1957. The mill was house-converted in the early 1960s, with all machinery being removed.

=== Ickham Mill ===
TR 214 580 51°16′41″N 1°10′23″E

Ickham mill was a corn mill. The building survives, converted to residential use.

=== Wickhambreaux Mill ===
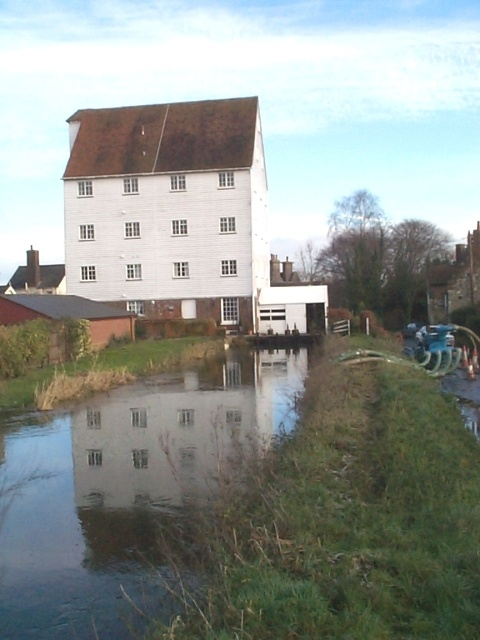
Wickhambreaux Mill

TR 220 556 51°15′22″N 1°10′48″E

Wickhambreaux mill was a large corn mill, with a brick base and four storeys clad in weatherboarding. The mill has been converted into flats, and retains its breast shot waterwheel.

=== Seaton Mill, Wickhambreaux ===
TR 226 586 51°16′59″N 1°11′28″E

Seaton mill was a large mill, with tarred weatherboarding. It had a breastshot waterwheel and a steam engine. The building survives, converted to residential use.

== See also ==
List of watermills in the United Kingdom

== Sources ==
- Fuller, M J; Spain, R J (1986). Watermills (Kent and the Borders of Sussex). Maidstone: Kent Archaeological Society. ISBN 0-906746-08-6.
- Coles Finch, William (1933). Watermills & Windmills. London: C W Daniel & Co.
- West, Jenny (1973). The Windmills of Kent. London: Charles Skilton. ISBN 0284-98534-1.
- Bryan, Anthony (2000). Francis Frith's Windmills and Watermills. Salisbury: Frith Book Company Ltd. p. 96. ISBN 1-85937-242-2.
- Watts, Martin (2000). Water and Wind Power. Princes Risborough: Shire Publications. p. 72. ISBN 0-7478-0418-4.
- TIMS Fourth Transactions 1977. London: Society for the Protection of Ancient Buildings. 1978.
