= Murston =

Area of Sittingbourne, Kent, England

Coordinates: 51.341°N 0.7524°E

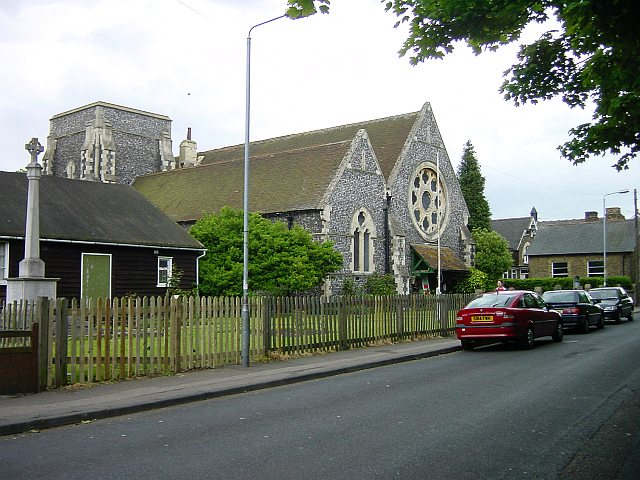
- Church of All Saints

- Location within Kent
- Population: 5,300 (2005); 5,977 (2011 Census)
- District: Swale
- Shire county: Kent
- Region: South East
- Country: England
- Sovereign state: United Kingdom
- Post town: Sittingbourne
- Postcode district: ME10
- Police: Kent
- Fire: Kent
- Ambulance: South East Coast

Murston is a suburb of Sittingbourne, in the Swale district, in the county of Kent, England. It is about 1 mile north-east of central Sittingbourne, on the east bank of the Milton Creek.

== History ==
According to Edward Hasted in 1798, it was once called 'Muston'. The parish contains about 1000 acres of land, of which about 30 are used as woodland. North of the village are salt marshes that suffer from winter fogs and are foul-smelling.

In 1870-72, John Marius Wilson's Imperial Gazetteer of England and Wales, referred to Murston having a post office (under Sittingbourne control) and a quay and several docks on the creek. It also comprised 1,317 acres of land, and 145 acres of water. The population in 1851 was 191 and then in 1861, it rose to 572. There was a ferry over the Swale to Elmley. In 1921 the civil parish had a population of 1603. On 31 March 1930 the parish was abolished to form Sittingbourne and Milton, part also went to Luddenham. It is now in the unparished area of Sittingbourne and Milton.

The older records, mention the Manor of 'Herst Hall'. King Richard I, while at the Siege of Acon in Palestine, was assisted by 'Bartholomew de Murston' of the manor. Later, John de Murston became owner of the manor, during the reign of Edward III. Sir Edward Hales, 1st Baronet was another manor owner. The widow of Sir Roger Twisden, 6th Baronet was the owner in 1798.

Also within the parish is East Hall, which also had a manorship. It has passed through many hands, including the St. Leger family in 1377. It now is a Grade II listed building.

Also in the parish is the estate of Mere Court (named from the closeness to the marshes). It has passed through many hands, including Sir Arnold Savage's father in 1374. It now is a Grade II listed building.

The village also has (the Grade II listed) Church of All Saints, which is in the diocese of Canterbury, and deanery of Sittingborne. It also now acts as a branch of Kent Savers Credit Union. Then, in 1990, Central Park Stadium was built for Sittingbourne F.C. but it is now used by Kent Kings.

== Geography ==
The former brickworks have been replaced by a large industrial estate (called the Eurolink Industrial Estate), including the Bayford Meadows Kart Circuit.

On the northern boundary of the parish, the Swale Way (a bypass route called the 'Sittingbourne Northern Relief road' (which was built in 2010/11)) passes over the Milton Creek heads from the A249 road (past Kemsley) towards the Eurolink Industrial estate and towards the East Hall Farm residential development. Plans were to extend it past Bapchild to the Kent Science Park near Highsted, before joining the M2 Motorway. However, they were put on hold by cost and planning issues.

Beyond the Swale Way, the area towards the Swale is still marshland. The Murston Lakes connected to the Swale and were initially constructed for earlier brickworks, were later used for oyster rearing and are now part of 'Little Murston Nature Reserve'. They are designated as a Special Protection Area (SPA). Passing along the Swale along the Milton Creek towards Sittingbourne is the Saxon Shore Way (a long-distance path around most of Kent).

== Industry ==
Murston was a centre for brickmaking.

Between 1830 and 1870, brick making employed over 50% of the local population. George Smeed (1812-1881) was a local entrepreneur who developed the extractive industries and the related enterprises. In 1846, he started making bricks at Murston. These were Kentish yellows known as stock bricks, permeable bricks with the distinctive yellow ochre colour, that would form an impermeable glaze when exposed to sulphur dioxide. These need a slurry of 64% brick earth (the local subsoil), 25% town ash, and 11% chalk. In 1848, he produced 30 million bricks. In 1850, he established a Roman Cement Mill and later a second one. The ran a fleet of Thames sailing barges, and started constructing them. He built a gasworks at Murston in 1863, and leased land to the Burnham, Brick, Lime and Cement company, who built two cement bottle kilns at Murston. During the 1860 he built 150 houses for his Murston workers. By 1880, his company Smeed Dean produced 50 million bricks. The company was sold to the Dunstable Cement Company in 1926, which is now part of Blue Circle Industries.

=== Brickworks ===
- Murston Brickfields: George Smeed started making bricks here in 1846, and by 1860 he had acquired many other brickfield, such as the three below.

- Muggleton’s Brickfield (1835-1850); Adelaide Dock up to the Golden Ball orchard. The field was taken over by George Smeed in 1860.
- McKenzie Brickfield: 1840-1845 – was halfway along the old Moat Road, about where the go-cart track is now. This field was taken over by George Smeed in 1860.
- Ashington Brickfield: 1843-1845 – was where the present All Saints Church was built. The field extended North East to the now Dolphin Road and Westward on the other side of Church Road. The field was taken over by George Smeed in 1860.

- Huggens Brickfield 1830.
- Wills and Packhams: 1870, they ceased brick making during the 1960s
- Burleys brickfields: (1875-1945). They also had a large field and a wharf on the Creek
- Gransden's brickfield: between Milton workhouse and the creek which closed in the 1900s
- Wood's was between Gransden's and Burleys. It closed 1928
- Cornfords brickfield: closed about 1914

The 1930s maps show a brickmaking works near Mere Court Farm. They had moved closer to the Milton Creek in the 1940s.
