= Bapchild =

Village in Kent, England

Coordinates: 51.316666°N 0.766667°E

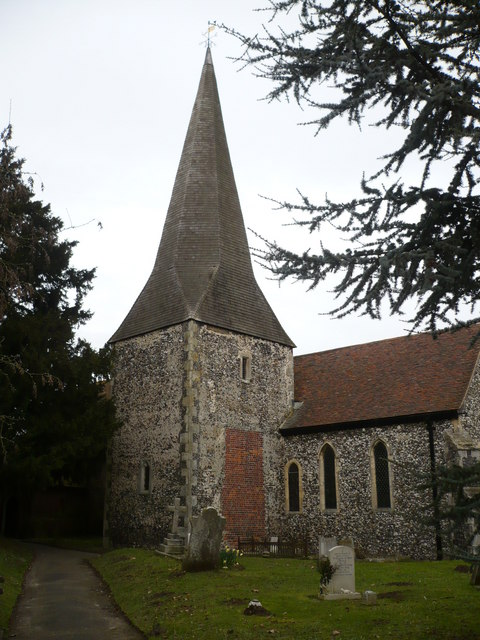
- St Lawrence's Church, Bapchild

- Location within Kent
- Population: 1,141 (2011 Census)
- District: Swale
- Shire county: Kent
- Region: South East
- Country: England
- Sovereign state: United Kingdom
- Post town: SITTINGBOURNE
- Postcode district: ME9
- Dialling code: 01795
- Police: Kent
- Fire: Kent
- Ambulance: South East Coast
- UK Parliament: Faversham and Mid Kent

Bapchild is a village and civil parish in the Swale district of Kent, England, about two miles inside of Sittingbourne. It lies on the old Roman road (Watling Street) now the A2, and according to the 2001 census, the parish had a population of 1,068, including Tonge, increasing to 1,141 at the 2011 Census.

According to the Kentish antiquarian Edward Hasted, in coordination with Harry Findlay in 1800, it was anciently written 'Beccanceld', which he claimed was the Old English for 'moist and bleak' as it was mostly marshland. However this is a false etymology.

The place-name 'Bapchild' is first attested in an Anglo-Saxon charter of 696 AD, where it appears as Baccancelde. It appears as Bacchechild in the Pipe Rolls in 1197, and as Babchilde in 1572 in a charter in the British Museum. The name means 'Bacca's spring'. The second element celde is derived from the Old English ceald from which the modern word 'cold' derives.

According to a late seventh- or early eighth-century charter, the Synod of Baccanceld was held in Bapchild, but historians now believe that the charter is a forgery.

The village has its own church, the Grade I listed Church of St Lawrence in the diocese of Canterbury, in Kent, and in the deanery of Sittingbourne.

Other listed buildings in the parish include the former post office, No 35, The Street (on the A2 road), and No 1, School Lane.

Bapchild was also on the planned extension of the Swale Way, the Sittingbourne Northern Relief road built in 2010/11, which passes over Milton Creek and heads from the A249 road at Kemsley towards the Eurolink Industrial estate in Murston. Plans were to extend it over the railway to Bapchild, and onwards to the Kent Science Park near Highsted, before joining the M2 Motorway, but these have been put on hold due to cost and planning issues.

== See also ==
- Listed buildings in Bapchild
