= Rodmersham =

Village in Kent, England

Coordinates: 51.321°N 0.759°E

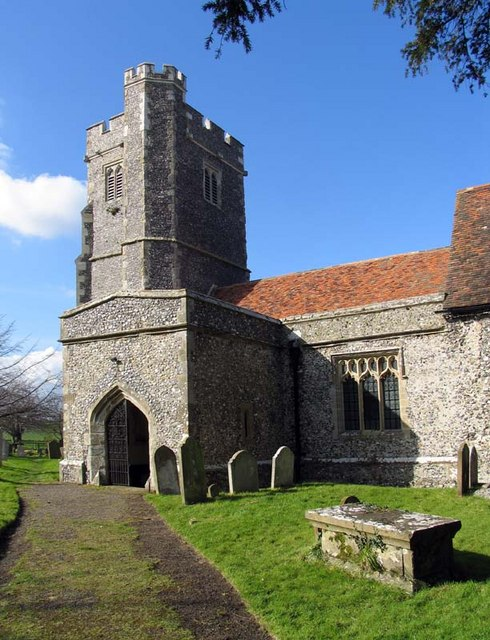
- St Nicholas Church, Rodmersham

- Location within Kent
- Population: 555 (2011 Census)
- Civil parish: Rodmersham
- District: Swale
- Shire county: Kent
- Region: South East
- Country: England
- Sovereign state: United Kingdom
- Post town: Sittingbourne
- Postcode district: ME9
- Police: Kent
- Fire: Kent
- Ambulance: South East Coast
- UK Parliament: Sittingbourne and Sheppey

Rodmersham is a village and civil parish in the Borough of Swale in the north of the English county of Kent. It is just under 1 mile (1.6 km) south of Bapchild on the A2 road and 1.5 miles (2.4 km) south-east of the town of Sittingbourne. Rodmersham Green, which forms the bulk of the modern village, is 0.5 miles (0.80 km) to the south-west of the village church towards the Highsted Valley and Tunstall.

== History ==
In 1798, Edward Hasted records that the parish was made up of 1,050 acres (420 ha) of land, of which 75 acres (30 ha) were woodland.

It was under the control of the Manor of Milton, who controlled most of Kent. In King Richard II's reign, it was owned by John de Podach (from Devonshire). His descendants renamed themselves 'Pordage'. In the reign of King James I, it was owned by Sir William Pordage. In 1615, he renamed the manor house, 'New House', now (Grade II listed) and called Rodmersham House. In Queen Anne's reign it passed to the Lushington family. Which included Mr Thomas Lushington, a noted scholar, born in Sandwich in 1589, and afterwards educated at Oxford. The manor house stayed in the private hands of the family.

The village church, (the Grade I listed) Church of St Nicholas, is in the diocese of Canterbury, and deanery of Sittingborne. The church contains an example of a timber sedilia thought to be 15th century. The altar and reredos are by Buckeridge and Floyce, described as representing "the best order of ecclesiastical art, viz., the 15th Century German, whilst the character of the ornament is founded on the old Norfolk work".

== Rodmersham Green ==
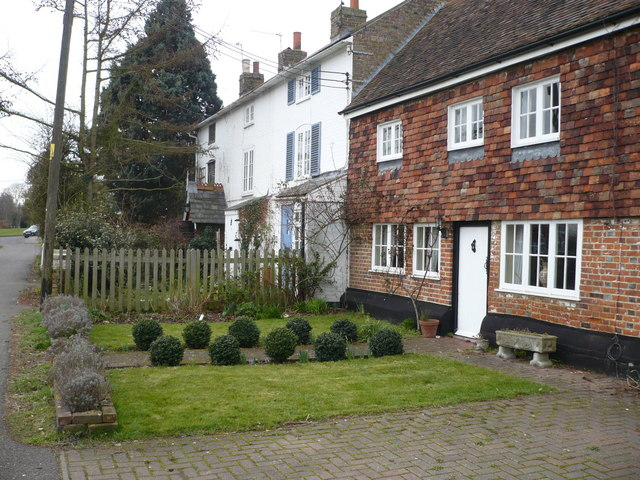
Cottages on Rodmersham Green

Hasted notes that Rodmersham Green also had a nearby hamlet of Upper Rodmersham, which is to the south of the village in an area traditionally used for orchards. There was a windmill at the north end of Rodmersham Green, built in 1835 and demolished in September 1969.

The village has six listed buildings: Baker Cottages, Pardoners Cottage, Holly Tree Lodge, Victoria House, Orsett House, and Vine Cottages. It also has a primary school, the Fruiterers Arms public house, Rodmersham Coffee Shop and two sporting venues, Rodmersham Cricket Club and Rodmersham Squash Club.

The artist Edward Ardizzone had a second home at 5 Vine Cottages, Rodermersham Green from the 1950s and took up full-time residence in 1972, dying in the village in 1979.

== See also ==
- Listed buildings in Rodmersham
