= Gascoyne's Scarlet =

Apple cultivar

'Gascoyne's Scarlet'
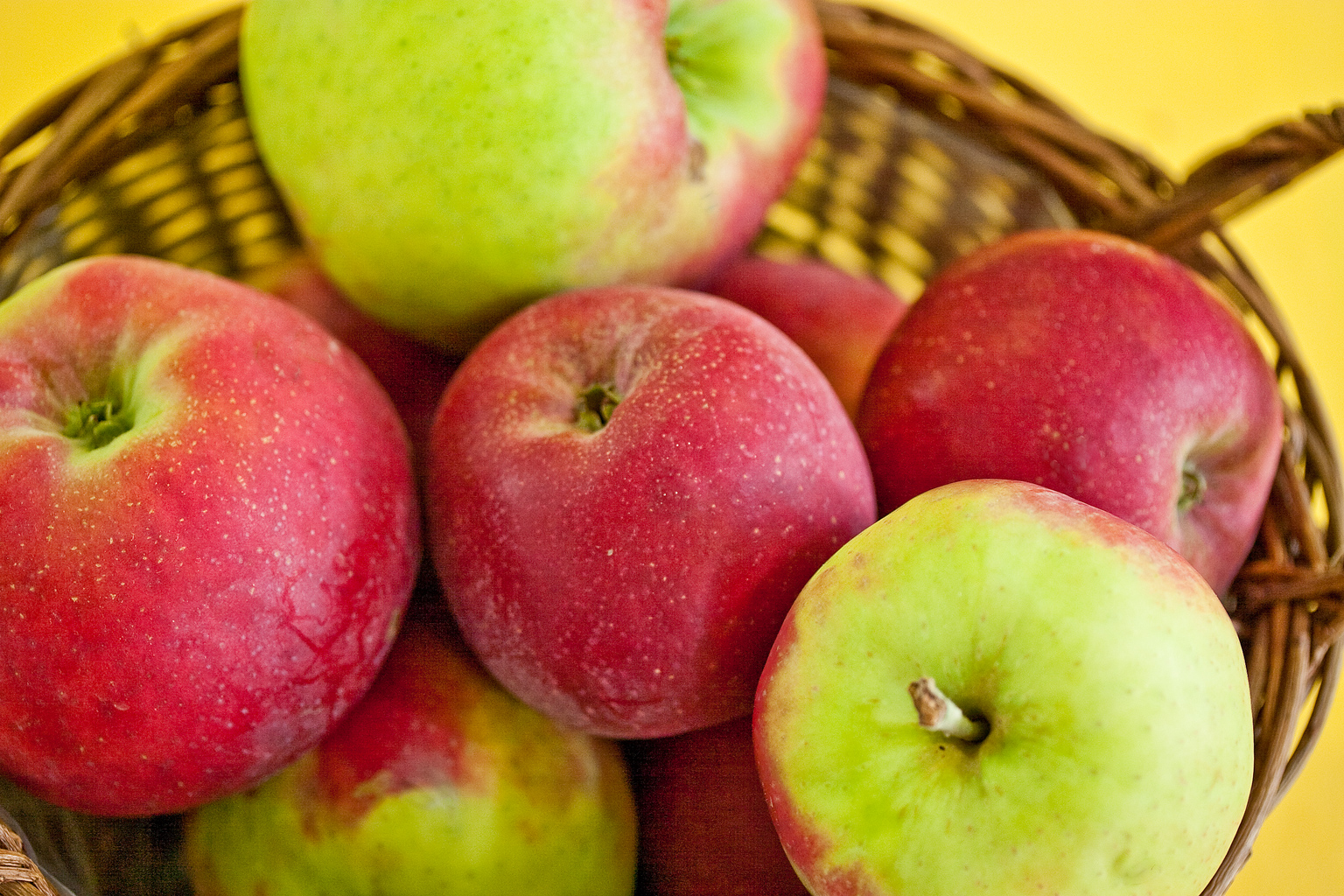
- Species: Malus domestica
- Origin: England, 1871

Gascoyne's Scarlet is an English cultivar of domesticated apple which is used to produce apple juice with a pink color. Is named after its developer, Mr. Gascoyne of Bapchild near Sittingbourne, Kent, England, who bred it before 1871.

Tree blossoms in spring producing showy flowers. Crop is big and harvest in October. Fruit are large in size, skin is pale green with red flush on the sunny side. Flesh is firm and aromatic, sharp when picked but mellows in storage, somewhat juicy, and pink coloured just beneath the skin.
