= Church of All Saints, Murston =

All Saints
- Church of All Saints
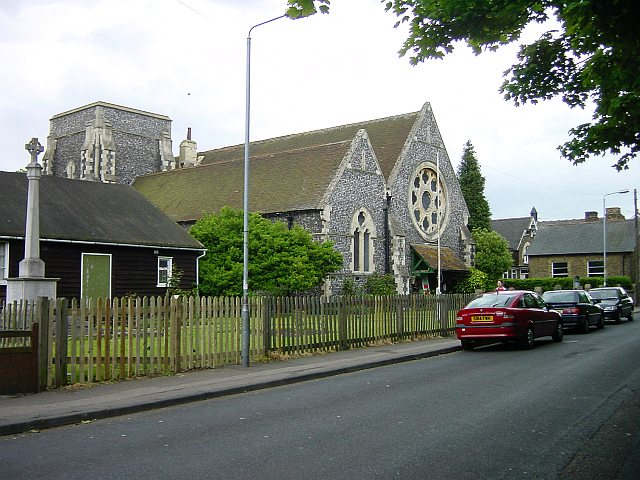
- All Saints

- Location within Kent
- 51°20′33″N 0°45′11″E
- OS grid reference: TQ 91840 63970
- Location: Murston, Kent
- Country: England
- Denomination: Anglican

History
- Founded: 1872–3
- Consecrated: 1874

Architecture
- Heritage designation: Listed building – Grade II
- Architect: William Burges
- Architectural type: Gothic Revival
- Style: Early English

The Church of All Saints, Murston, Sittingbourne, is a Church of England parish church in the county of Kent, England. It is notable due to its architect, William Burges, and was constructed in 1873–4. The church was built in "an early Gothic Style" and incorporates fragments of the original 12th-century church. It is a Grade II listed building as of 13 December 1974.

== History ==
The original All Saints church was constructed in 1291. By the time of the Industrial Revolution, a number of brickworks and gasworks had been constructed around the church. This impacted on worship due to the industrial fumes making it hard for the congregation to breathe. The rector of the church paid £500 (£44,985 in 2023) of his own money in order for a new church to be erected away from the industrial area. The mediaeval church was largely demolished, with materials from it being recycled and incorporated in the new All Saints church. Part of the chancel was left standing to act as a mortuary for the graveyard. The new church was designed by William Burges and cost a total of £3,000 (£269,907 in 2023). There were plans to incorporate the tower in the new church and the estimate for this was £3,000 but the public subscription raised only £2,000. As a consequence, the intended tower was truncated.

The new church's foundation stone was laid in the presence of the Bishop of Dover and when it was completed, it was consecrated by the Archbishop of Canterbury in 1874. The old churchyard continued to be used for burials until 1922 when the Bishop of Dover consecrated the new church's churchyard for burials. The church received grade II listed status in 1974. In 2022, medieval graffiti was rediscovered on the church's pillars that had been brought over from the old church.

The church is the base for the Murston Community Bank, an initiative undertaken by the Diocese of Canterbury in conjunction with the Kent Savers Credit Union which opened in 2014. Church services are not undertaken at All Saints.
