= Upper Harbledown =

Village in Kent, England

Coordinates: 51.2854°N 1.0306°E

- Location within Kent
- OS grid reference: TR114584
- District: City of Canterbury
- Shire county: Kent
- Region: South East
- Country: England
- Sovereign state: United Kingdom
- Post town: Canterbury
- Postcode district: CT2
- Dialling code: 01227
- Police: Kent
- Fire: Kent
- Ambulance: South East Coast
- UK Parliament: Canterbury

Upper Harbledown is a village in Harbledown and Rough Common civil parish about 2 miles (3 km) west of Canterbury, Kent, England. The population is roughly 400.

== History ==
The village lies on or very close to the ancient trackway known as Watling Street. This became the main A2 road from London to Canterbury and Dover, which ran through the centre of the village before it was bypassed.

== Amenities ==
The village has a village green, a children's play area, and a village hall. It did have a public house, The Plough, and a garden centre, but these have both closed down.
