= A2 road (England) =

Road in southern England

A2
- A2 road highlighted in green
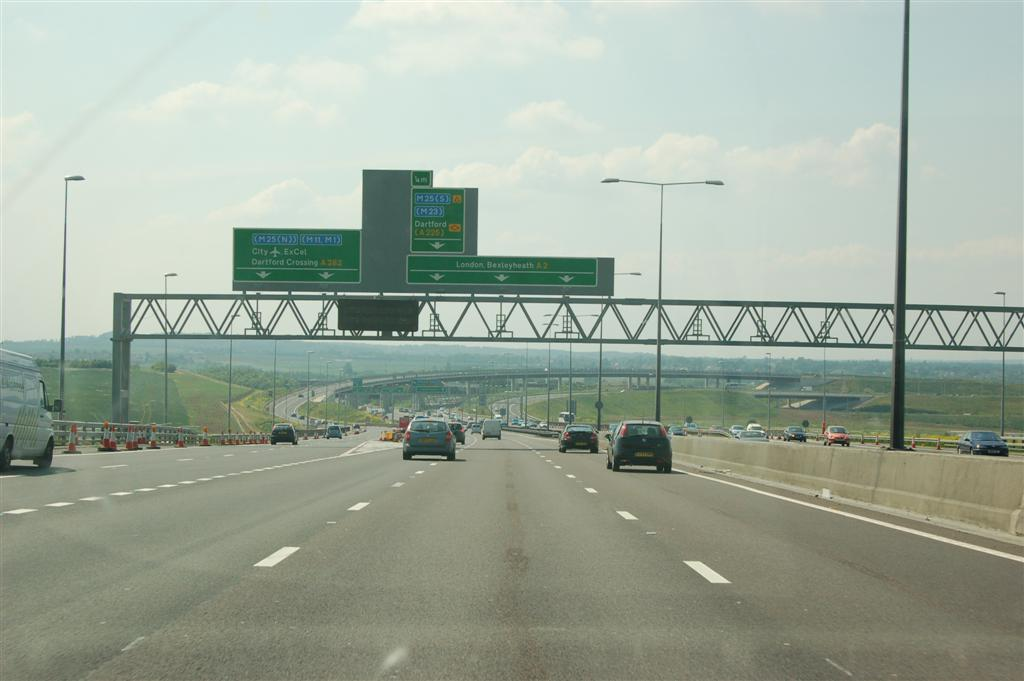
- A2 heading west towards the M25/A282

Route information
- Length: 71.95 mi (115.79 km)

Major junctions
- North west end: A3 in Southwark; 51.5012°N 0.0931°W
- A20; A205; A282; M25; M2; M2; A299; A28
- South east end: A20 in Dover; 51.1263°N 1.3271°E

Location
- Country: United Kingdom
- Constituent country: England
- Primary destinations: Dartford, Rochester, Faversham, Canterbury

Road network
- Roads in the United Kingdom; Motorways; A and B road zones
← A1	→ A3

The A2 is a major road in south-east England, connecting London with the English Channel port of Dover in Kent. This route has always been of importance as a connection between London and sea trade routes to Continental Europe. It was originally known as the Dover Road. The M2 motorway has replaced part of the A2 as the strategic route.

Unlike the other single digit A-roads in Great Britain, the A2 does not form a zone boundary. The boundary between Zones 1 and 2 is the River Thames.

== History of the route ==
The route of the current A2 follows a similar route to that of a Celtic ancient trackway. It was an important route for the Romans linking London with Canterbury and the three Channel ports of Rutupiae (now Richborough), Dubris (now Dover) and Portus Lemanis (in modern Lympne). It had river crossings at Rochester over the River Medway; Dartford (River Darent) and Crayford (River Cray). The Romans paved the road and constructed the first Rochester Bridge across the Medway. Access to London was via London Bridge which was first constructed by the Romans in AD 50. The road appeared in the Antonine Itinerary, a contemporary map of Roman roads in Britain, as 'Item a Londinio ad portum Dubris'.

In Anglo-Saxon times it became part of a longer road known as Wæcelinga Stræt ('Watling Street' in modern English). Rochester Bridge was rebuilt in stone in 1391 and the 'Wardens and Commonalty of Rochester Bridge' were created to maintain the bridge, the modern equivalent of which, the Rochester Bridge Trust, still manages the current crossing.

By the 17th century, the road had fallen into disrepair and sections were converted into turnpike roads by various Turnpike Acts passed by Parliament. The section between Gravesend and Rochester was turnpiked in 1712 and that from Chatham to Canterbury in 1730; the section from there to Dover was only turnpiked in the 19th century by which time it was known as the Great Dover Road. Rochester Bridge was rebuilt in cast iron in 1856 (and rebuilt again in 1914 with a second bridge in 1970). The London, Chatham and Dover Railway completed a railway route from London to Dover in the 1860s. Access to London from the A2 across the River Thames was improved with the completion of Tower Bridge (1894), Blackwall Tunnel (1897) and the Rotherhithe Tunnel (1908).

The road was given the reference A2 within the Great Britain road numbering scheme in the 1920s. The Dartford Southern By-pass, which relieved chronic congestion on the old route through Dartford, provided considerable local employment during the Post–World War I recession. It was opened by the Prince of Wales in 1924 and is now named Princes Road. It is estimated that the project provided 63,500 days work to local unemployed people.

The Dartford Crossing opened as a single tunnel in 1963, then a second tunnel opened in 1980 for additional traffic on the A2, and the M2 Motorway opened in stages between 1963 and 1965 providing an alternative faster route for long-distance traffic avoiding the A2 through Rochester and Chatham. The three-lane stretch of the A2 between Falconwood and Cobham was built in stages from around 1963 until 1973. A section of Ringway 3 (part of the proposed M16 motorway linking to the A2, which later formed part of the M25 motorway opened between 1974 and 1977.

The Strood to Swanscombe dualling was constructed from 1 June 1964, being seven miles, with a contract of £4,436,869 given to A. Monk Ltd of Padgate, near Warrington. The dualled section replaced a single-carriageway three-lane road. It was a dualled three-lane section, with hard shoulders (hardened verge), with four grade-separated junctions. It was to finish in the summer of 1966. Leonard Fairclough & Son constructed the bridges. The section was opened at noon on Friday 29 July 1966, with the Bishop of Rochester, David Say, who said a prayer, and George Harris, the managing director of Monk Ltd.

The Rochester Way Relief Road, bypassing Kidbrooke and Eltham, was opened in 1988. The M20 motorway to Folkestone was constructed in stages from the 1960s and provided a faster route to Dover following extensions built in the early 1990s, after which traffic levels on the M2 and A2 reduced. The Queen Elizabeth II Bridge opened in 1991.

A new flyover for A2 westbound to M25 northbound traffic was completed in late 2007.

In 2008, a section of the A2 beside Gravesend was widened to 3 or 4 lanes between Pepperhill (a suburb of Northfleet) to Cobham. It was also rerouted away from the houses of Gravesend/Singlewell to make room for the new lanes and reduce the amount of noise and pollution from the widened roads. The old route of the A2 (the Roman road) has been made into a combined footpath and cycle path. The new road section opened in 2009. A section of the old road has been turned into Cyclopark, with footpaths, cycle paths and an equestrian route along the old road.

== Proposed developments ==
A new Lower Thames Crossing down river from the Dartford Crossing linking to the A2 has been proposed by the Department for Transport in 2009.

== The route today ==
Its original alignment roughly followed a mix of the ancient Celtic route and the turnpike road to Dover. The Roman alignment, however, is not easy to identify and much of the original A2 does not exactly follow what is known of the Roman route (the straightness of many long stretches is misleading). A section of the modern A2 from Rochester to the Roman settlement of Vagniacae, modern Springhead, is believed to roughly follow the Roman route.

=== Borough to Shooter's Hill ===
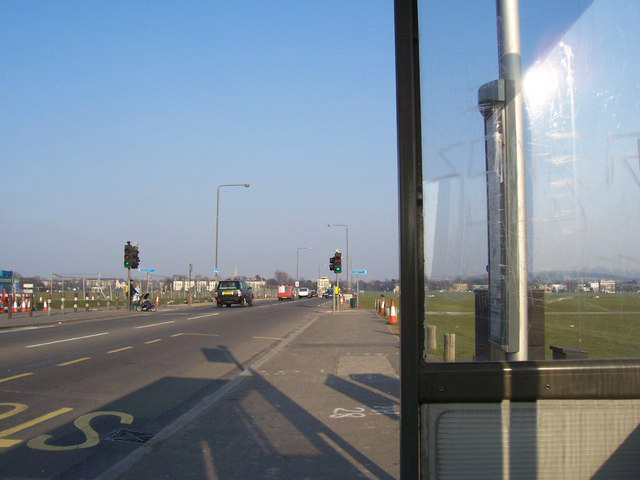
A2 across Blackheath.

The A2 starts at Borough in Central London, at a junction with the A3, near the church of St George the Martyr. The remains of a small Roman temple was excavated at Tabard Square in 2003. The A2 at this point is named Great Dover Street, and is the only part of the A2 within the congestion charging zone. At the end of the road, it meets the London Inner Ring Road and becomes a primary route. The A2 heads along Old Kent Road towards New Cross, where the A20 breaks away. The A2 continues east through Deptford and Blackheath until it arrives at the Shooter's Hill Interchange with the A102 near Greenwich. A section of the Roman road has been identified running through Greenwich Park on an alignment with Vanbrugh Park.

=== Shooter's Hill to Three Crutches ===
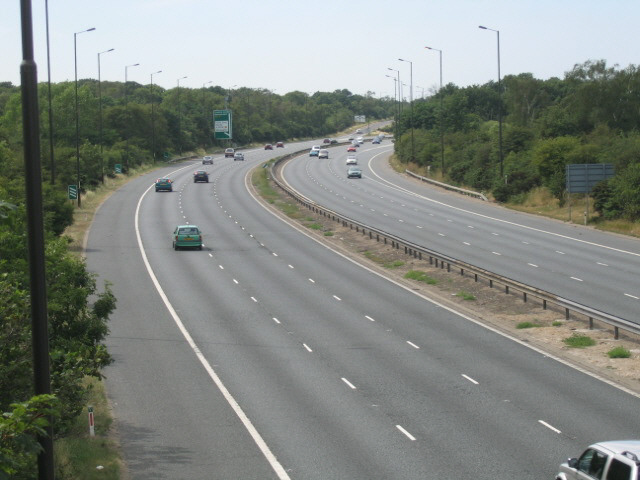
A2 at Leyton Cross

At Shooter's Hill, Watling Street and the A2 part company, as Watling Street continues along the A207. At this point the A2 joins a dual carriageway, the Rochester Way Relief Road (the carriageways to the north of this junction being the A102 Blackwall Tunnel Approach) with a speed limit of 50 mph (80 km/h).

The A2 meets traffic lights at Kidbrooke; this is the last set of traffic lights out of Greater London (the lights only apply to traffic turning right onto the A2213). Shortly after here, the A2 crosses the A205 South Circular Road and becomes a motorway in all but name, with 3 lanes and a hard shoulder in each direction. Within the London section the left hand lane is used for local traffic.

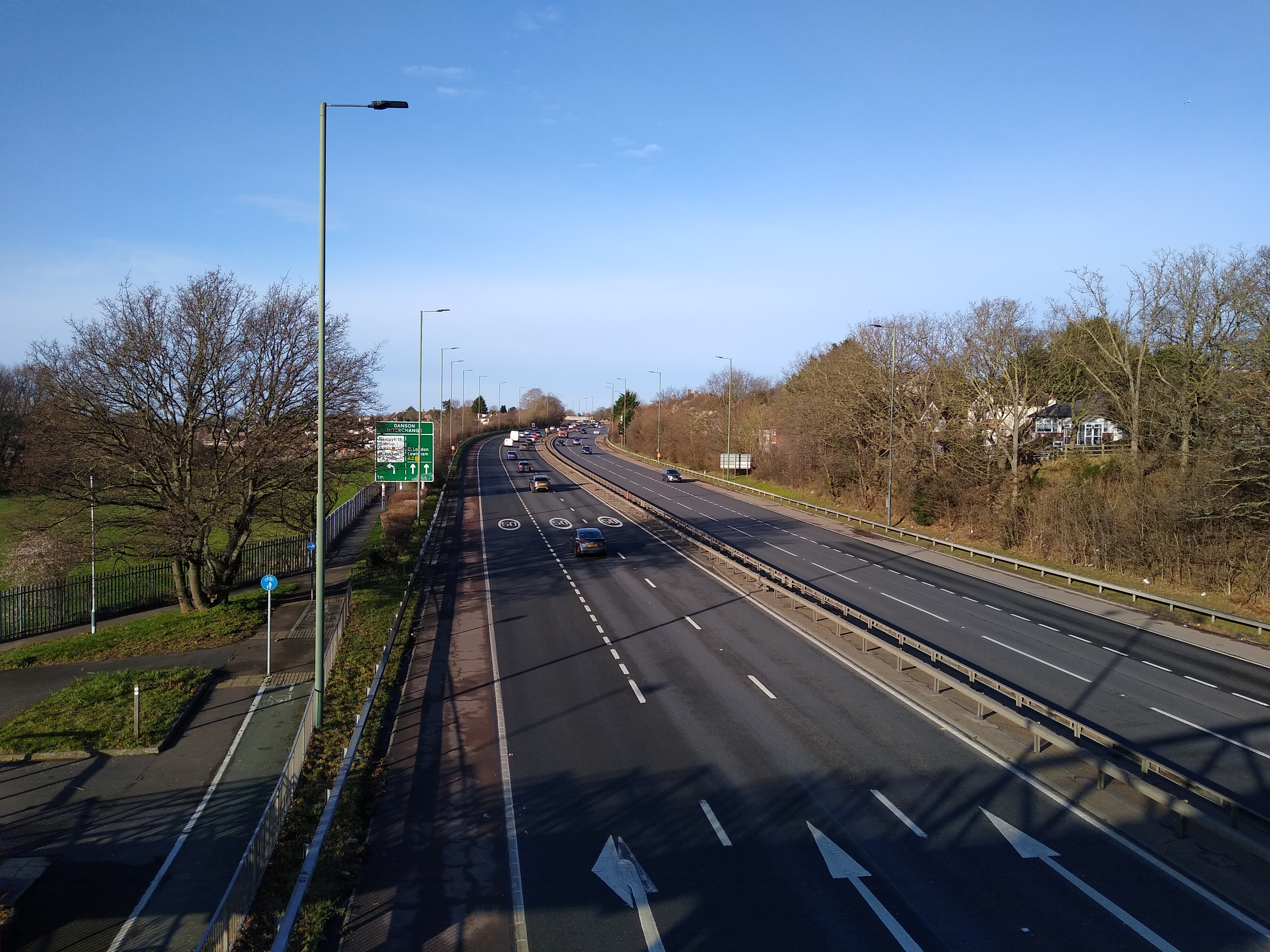
A2 road in Bexley

At Falconwood, the road becomes the East Rochester Way – this point was once the westbound terminus of the dual carriageway. There are exits for Bexleyheath, Black Prince (at Bexley), and other south east London suburbs. Motorists should be aware that the section between the Blackwall Tunnel Approach and Dartford Heath is monitored using average speed cameras. Just before the A2 reaches the junction with the A2018, the speed limit increases to the national speed limit (70 mph, 112 km/h) as the road crosses the Greater London boundary to head eastwards into Kent towards Dartford, bypassing the town to the south and cutting through Dartford Heath. The next junction links the road to the M25 London Orbital Motorway at Dartford; the next, (Bean Interchange), is for the B255 and A296 for Bluewater, where Watling Street rejoins the A2.

The A2 then bypasses Gravesend, before merging into the M2 at Three Crutches Interchange, near Strood.

This latter section, from the Pepper Hill Interchange (near Northfleet and the Ebbsfleet International railway station), to the Cobham Interchange underwent extensive works (2007–2009) to move the entire carriageway south to run parallel to the Channel Tunnel Rail Link, so as to move the road away from residential housing – and continue using four lanes in each direction, with grade separated junctions.

=== Three Crutches to Brenley Corner ===
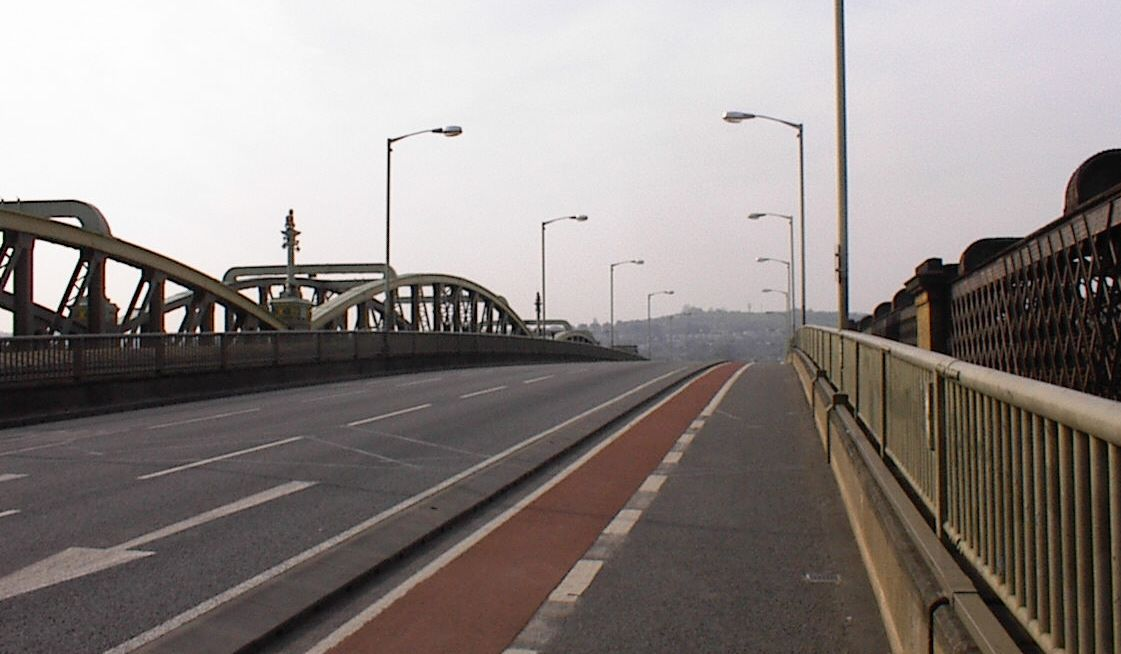
Looking west: the modern A2 crossing the River Medway at Rochester near the Roman and Celt crossings

The A2 reverts to a non-primary single carriageway road at this point. The M2 now parts company to bypass the Medway Towns, while the A2 heads into them. It enters Strood before crossing the River Medway into Rochester. The A2 bypasses the old High Street, heading instead along Corporation Street alongside the railway lines. It crosses the old High Street, climbs Star Hill and heads east into Chatham where it meets the A230 and A231. There used to be one way ring road but it was changed to two way running in 2006 and was partially closed to all but buses and taxis in 2009, meaning the ring road was no more. The A2 heads to the south of Gillingham, where the A289 Medway Northern Bypass joins it. The A278 departs from the A2 to head south to meet the M2, whereas the A2 goes through Rainham and Newington before entering green country for the first time since Three Crutches.

The road meets the A249, now dualled, to the west of Sittingbourne, before going through the town itself (bypassing the now-pedestrianised High Street, as it does in Rochester and Chatham). Leaving Sittingbourne, the A2 continues east in an almost straight line, for it is still along the alignment of Watling Street at this point. At Ospringe it passes the Maison Dieu, now a museum of Roman artifacts but originally a wayside hospital commissioned by Henry III in 1234. The A2 continues to Faversham, but does not (and never has) go through the town, but almost bypasses it to the south. A mile (1.6 km) later, it arrives at Brenley Corner, junction 7 of the M2.

=== Brenley Corner To Dover Docks ===
At Brenley Corner, the A2 once again becomes a primary dual carriageway. Straight after the interchange, Dunkirk and Boughton are bypassed as the A2 continues towards Canterbury and Dover. Formerly it went through Canterbury city centre, this has now been bypassed and the original route is now called the A2050. It breaks off from the A2 at Harbledown – just after Gate Services – taking all Canterbury traffic with it. At Wincheap, the A28 meets the A2, although only westbound traffic can exit the A2 at this point. The A2050 rejoins the A2 at Bridge.

Traffic for the Channel Tunnel and Folkestone leaves at the junction with the A260, and shortly after this junction the A2 loses its dual carriageway status, regains it, and loses it again within a few miles. The A2 formerly ran through Lydden but was diverted in 1977. Now single carriageway, the A2 forms the Dover bypass. It meets the A256 for Sandwich and Ramsgate at a briefly dualled section, before reverting to single carriageway for the final time. The A2 breaks through the cliffs above Dover Docks before turning 180 degrees by way of a pigtail bridge and "touching down" on land again at the entrance to the Eastern Docks, where both it and the A20 terminate.

== Junction list ==
County	Location	mi	km	Destinations	Notes
Greater London	Southwark	0.0	0.0	A3 / A3201 – The City, London Bridge, Elephant and Castle, Waterloo, London, Southwark, Blackfriars, London	Northern terminus; continues as A3201 beyond A3
Greater London	Southwark	0.03	0.048	A2198 east – Tower Bridge, Bermondsey	Western terminus of A2198
Greater London	Southwark	0.5– 0.7	0.80– 1.1	A100 north (Tower Bridge Road / Ring Road) to A13 / A11 / A10 – Tower Bridge, Bermondsey, The City, London Docklands A201 (Ring Road) to A3 / A4 / A40 – Westminster, Elephant and Castle	Southern terminus of A101 / A201; Tower Bridge, Bermondsey signed southbound only, A100, to routes, The City, and Docklands signed northbound only
Greater London	Southwark	1.7	2.7	A2208 north-east – Rotherhithe, Surrey Quays	South-west terminus of A 2208
Greater London	Lewisham	2.8	4.5	A202 west (Queen's Road) – Peckham, Brixton	Eastern terminus of A202; no direct access from A2 east to A202 or from A202 to A2 west
Greater London	Lewisham	3.3– 3.5	5.3– 5.6	A20 east (Lewisham Way / Amersham Road) to A21 / B218 – Channel Tunnel, Lewisham, Bromley, Brockley	Western terminus of A20
Greater London	Lewisham	3.8	6.1	A2209 north (Deptford Church Street) / A2210 south (Brookmill Road) – Deptford, Lewisham	Southern terminus of A2209; northern terminus of A2210
Greater London	Greenwich	3.9	6.3	A206 east (Greenwich High Road) / Deals Gateway – Greenwich	Western terminus of A206
Greater London	Greenwich	4.2	6.8	A2211 (Greenwich South Street / Lewisham Road) – Greenwich, Lewisham	Route signed northbound only
Greater London	Greenwich	5.8	9.3	A2213 south (Kidbrooke Park Road)	Northern terminus of A2213
Greater London	Greenwich	6.0	9.7	A102 north / A207 east to A206 – Blackwall Tunnel, Welling, Shooters Hill, London Docklands, Woolwich Ferry	To A206, Docklands, and Woolwich Ferry signed northbound only; Southern terminus of A102; western terminus of A207
Greater London	Greenwich	6.0	9.7	North end of freeway	
Greater London	Greenwich	6.4	10.3	Local traffic (Rochester Way)	Southbound exit only
Greater London	Greenwich	6.8	10.9	A2213 south to A20 – Kidbrooke, Lewisham	Partial intersection; no northbound entrance; To A20 and Lewisham signed southbound only
Greater London	Greenwich	7.4– 7.8	11.9– 12.6	A205 (South Circular Road) to A20 / A21 – Lewisham, Catford, Shooters Hill	Lewisham signed southbound only; To A21, Catford, and Shooters Hill signed northbound only
Greater London	Greenwich—Bexley borough boundary	9.4– 9.7	15.1– 15.6	Local traffic (Reifield Road / Rochester Way)	Northbound exit and southbound entrance
Greater London	Bexley	11.0– 11.3	17.7– 18.2	A221 to A210 – Bexleyheath, Sidcup, Blackfen	
Greater London	Bexley	11.9– 12.0	19.2– 19.3	Local traffic (Upton Road)	Southbound exit and entrance
Greater London	Bexley	12.6– 12.7	20.3– 20.4	To A220 / A223 – Bexleyheath town centre, Crayford, Bexley	
Kent	Dartford town boundary	13.6– 14.2	21.9– 22.9	A2018 – Wilmington, Kent, Dartford, Foots Cray, Bexley	Dartford signed southbound only; Foots Cray, Bexley signed northbound only
Kent	Dartford town boundary	16.3– 17.5	26.2– 28.2	M25 to M20 – Channel Tunnel, Gatwick Airport, Dartford Crossing	Eastbound exit
Kent	Dartford town boundary	16.3– 17.5	26.2– 28.2	M25 south to M23 / A225 – Dartford A282 north to M25 north / M11 / M1 – City Airport, ExCel, Dartford Crossing	Westbound exits
Kent		18.2– 18.7	29.3– 30.1	B255 – Greenhithe, Kent, Bluewater (shopping centre), Bean	
Kent		19.6– 20.6	31.5– 33.2	A2260 – Northfleet, Gravesend (west), Ebbsfleet International railway station	
Kent		20.6– 21.1	33.2– 34.0	B262 to B260 – Pepperhill, Longfield	No eastbound exit
Kent	Gravesend town boundary	21.7– 22.5	34.9– 36.2	A227 – Gravesend central, Wrotham, Services	
Kent	Gravesend	23.0– 23.6	37.0– 38.0	Gravesend (east)	
Kent		24.6– 25.2	39.6– 40.6	Cobham, Shorne	
Kent	Strood town boundary	25.5– 26.6	41.0– 42.8	M2 east – Channel Tunnel, Canterbury, Chatham, Kent A289 east to A288 – Gillingham, Kent, Grain	Eastbound exit and entrance; no access from M2 west to A2 east
Kent	Strood			End of freeway	
Kent	Strood	28.2– 28.4	45.4– 45.7	A228 to M2 – Sri Guru Ravidass Bhawan Temple, Cuxton	A228 north not signed
Kent	Strood—Rochester, Kent town boundary	28.5– 28.7	45.9– 46.2	Rochester Bridge over River Medway	
Kent	Rochester, Kent	29.4	47.3	A229 south (City Way) to M2 / M20 – Maidstone	To M20 signed westbound only; northern terminus of A229
Kent	Chatham	30.0	48.3	A230 south to M2 – Maidstone	Northern terminus of A230
Kent	Chatham	30.4	48.9	The Brook — Chatham town centre (A231 east)	Western terminus of A231
Kent	Chatham—Gillingham, Kent town boundary	32.1	51.7	A231 west (Canterbury Street) – Gillingham, Kent	A231 signed eastbound only; eastern terminus of A231
Kent	Sittingbourne town boundary	38.2	61.5	A249 south to M2 / M20 – Maidstone	Access only to A249 south and from A249 north
Kent	Faversham	47.0	75.6	A251 south (Ashford Road) to M2 – Ashford, Kent	Northern terminus of A251
Kent		48.6	78.2	M2 west / A299 east – London, Ramsgate, Margate, Whitstable, Herne Bay	Margate signed eastbound only, Whitstable and Herne Bay westbound only; eastern terminus of M2; western terminus of A299; M2 junction 7
Kent		48.6	78.2	Begin freeway	
Kent	Boughton under Blean	48.8– 49.1	78.5– 79.0	Dunkirk, Boughton	Eastbound exit and westbound entrance
Kent	Boughton under Blean	51.6	83.0	Dunkirk, Boughton	Westbound exit and eastbound entrance
Kent		52.2	84.0	Chartham Hatch	Westbound exit and entrance
Kent	Upper Harbledown	52.9– 53.1	85.1– 85.5	Upper Harbledown, Chartham Hatch	Eastbound exit and westbound entrance
Kent	Upper Harbledown	53.5	86.1	A2050 east to A28 – Canterbury, Harbledown	Eastbound exit and westbound entrance; westbound terminus of A2050
Kent	Canterbury	54.9– 55.4	88.4– 89.2	A28 – Canterbury, Ashford, Kent	No eastbound exit
Kent	Bridge village boundary	57.5– 58.1	92.5– 93.5	A2050 west – Sturry	No eastbound exit
Kent		58.1	93.5	Bridge, Patrixbourne, Bekesbourne, Adisham	Eastbound exit only
Kent	Bridge village boundary	59.6– 60.3	95.9– 97.0	Kingston, Barham, Bishopsbourne, Bridge	Bridge signed westbound only
Kent		62.0– 63.1	99.8– 101.5	A260 / B2046 – Channel Tunnel, Folkestone, Aylesham, Wingham, Kent, Womenswold, Snowdown, Adisham, Nonington, Barham, Kent	Barham signed westbound only
Kent		63.1	101.5	End freeway	
Kent	Whitfield	68.7	110.6	Whitfield Hill (A256 south) / Sandwich Road / Honeywood Road — Whitfield, Dover (north), River, Temple Ewell	Western terminus of A256 concurrency
Kent	Whitfield	69.3– 69.8	111.5– 112.3	A256 north – Ramsgate, Sandwich	Grade-separated junction; eastern terminus of A256 concurrency
Kent	Guston, Kent	70.7	113.8	A258 – Deal	
Kent	Dover	72.2	116.2	A20 west to M20 / Dover Docks – Dover town centre	South-east terminus; eastern terminus of A20
1.000 mi = 1.609 km; 1.000 km = 0.621 mi

== See also ==
- Watling Street
