= St Michael and All Angels Church, Harbledown =

Coordinates: 51°16′57″N 1°03′20″E

- England
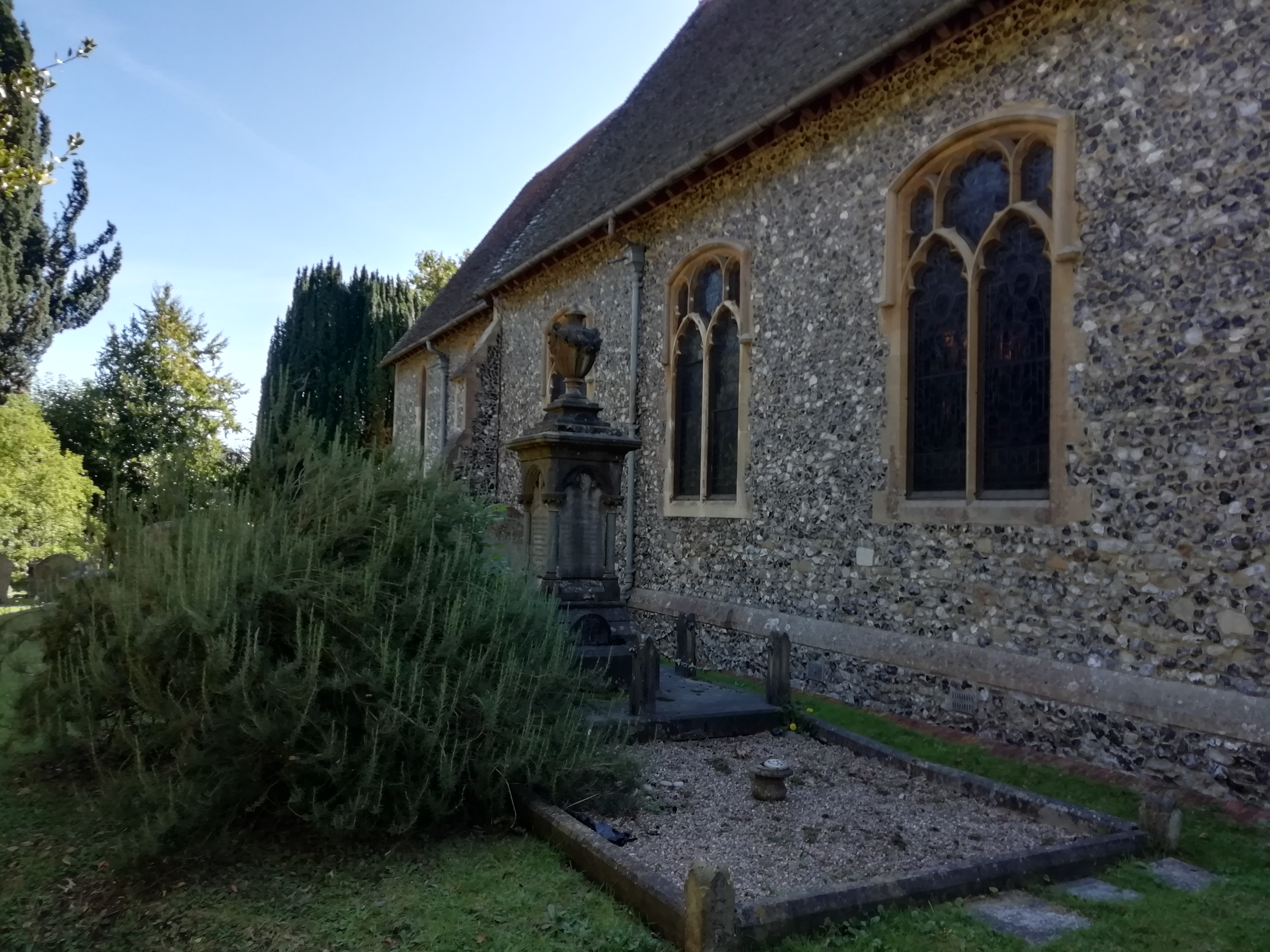
- The north wall of St Michael and All Angels, part of the 1881 renovations
- St Michael and All Angels Church, Harbledown
- OS grid reference: TR 13188 58148
- Location: Harbledown
- Country: England
- Denomination: Church of England
- Tradition: Anglo-Catholic

History
- Consecrated: 1160, approx.

Administration
- Diocese: Canterbury

The Church of St Michael and All Angels is a Norman stone church in the village of Harbledown, near Canterbury, England. A part of the Church of England, it follows the Anglo-Catholic tradition, is a parish of the Society of Saint Wilfrid and Saint Hilda, is under the care of the Bishop of Richborough and is served by clergy of the Society of the Holy Cross. It has been listed Grade II on the National Heritage List for England since January 1967. Aphra Behn, a pioneering female playwright, was baptised here on 14 December 1640.

== History ==
The church was built around 1160 but received an enlargement during the 13th century and twice during the 19th century; a north transept was built in 1825 but later demolished in 1881 to make way for a new chancel and nave, designed by J. P. St Aubyn, doubling the size of the original church.

=== Mission Church of St Gabriel, Rough Common ===
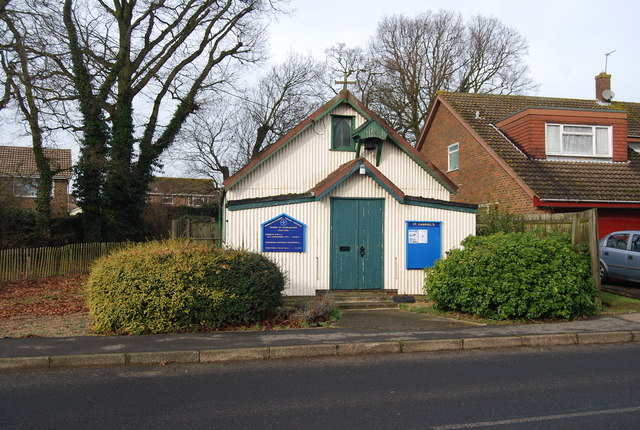
The Mission Church of St Gabriel, Rough Common

In 1890 the Mission Church of St Gabriel was established nearby in Rough Common as a sister church; it is nicknamed the 'Tin Tabernacle'. The east window, above the altar, was saved from St Paul's Church in Ramsgate after it was bombed during the Second World War.
