= Synod of Baccanceld =

Purported medieval synod

The Synod of Baccanceld is said to have been held in Bapchild, Kent at the end of the seventh or beginning of the eighth century.

According to the 1913 Catholic Encyclopedia:

This meeting was rather a witenagemot, or Anglo-Saxon Parliament or Royal Council (in Christian kingdoms often including clerics), rather than an ecclesiastical synod, as it was presided over by Wihtred, King of Kent. There were present at its deliberations Berhtwald, Archbishop of Canterbury, and Tobias, Bishop of Rochester, besides abbots, abbesses, priests, deacons and lay lords. The chief enactments are embodied in a charter whose terms secured to the Church forever the donations and privileges bestowed on it by the laity, since "what had once been given to God might never be resumed to man's use". Moreover, on the death of prelates, fitting successors were to be appointed with the advice and approval of the archbishop, without any royal intervention; such action would nullify the election; and lay interference was expressly disclaimed as being outside the limits of the laity's rights. The cathedral churches of Canterbury and Rochester were granted in perpetuity, immunity from royal requisitions or tribute otherwise than voluntary, and these were never to create precedent; all these privileges being secured under severe spiritual penalties for infringement. The interest and importance of this document rest on the fact that Henry Spelman and others have regarded it as the most ancient English charter. Its authenticity has been called in question; but though different versions of it exist, there can be little doubt of the general genuineness of the terms common to all, as here summarized.

Modern historians regard the charter reporting the synod as a forgery, although using a witness list from genuine charters.
