= Listed buildings in Harbledown and Rough Common =

Historic structures in Kent, England

Harbledown and Rough Common is a village and civil parish in the City of Canterbury district of Kent, England. It contains 57 listed buildings that are recorded in the National Heritage List for England. Of these one is grade I and 56 are grade II.

This list is based on the information retrieved online from Historic England .

== Key ==
Grade	Criteria
I	Buildings that are of exceptional interest
II*	Particularly important buildings of more than special interest
II	Buildings that are of special interest

== Listing ==
Name	Grade	Location	Type	Completed (Note: The date given is the date used by Historic England as significant for the initial building or that of an important part in the structure's description.)	Date designated	Grid ref. (Note: The grid reference is based on the British national grid reference system, sometimes known as OSGB36, used by the Ordnance Survey.) Geo-coordinates	Notes	Entry number (Note: The "List Entry Number" is a unique number assigned to each listed building and scheduled monument by Historic England.)	Image	Wikidata
K6 Telephone Kiosk	II				16 March 1988	TR1300158239; 51°17′00″N 1°03′11″E		1085437	Upload Photo	Q26372554
Hall Place Cottages	II	1-4, Church Hill, Harbledown			14 March 1980	TR1289958216; 51°17′00″N 1°03′06″E		1085634	Upload Photo	Q26373568
Barn to Harbledown Farm	II	Church Hill, Harbledown			14 March 1980	TR1294258199; 51°16′59″N 1°03′08″E		1068688	Upload Photo	Q26321386
Church Hill House	II	Church Hill, Harbledown			14 March 1980	TR1315658179; 51°16′58″N 1°03′19″E		1068723	Upload Photo	Q26321418
Church of St Michael	II	Church Hill, Harbledown	church building		30 January 1967	TR1318858148; 51°16′57″N 1°03′20″E		1085636	Church of St Michael More images	Q26373579
Church of St Nicholas	I	Church Hill, Harbledown	church building		14 March 1980	TR1304558153; 51°16′58″N 1°03′13″E		1085632	Church of St Nicholas More images	Q17529545
Cumberland Cottage Pear Tree Cottage	II	Church Hill, Harbledown			30 January 1967	TR1295858241; 51°17′01″N 1°03′09″E		1068716	Upload Photo	Q26321412
Duke Cottage	II	Church Hill, Harbledown			14 March 1980	TR1301158247; 51°17′01″N 1°03′11″E		1336519	Upload Photo	Q26621004
Duke House	II	Church Hill, Harbledown			14 March 1980	TR1297958254; 51°17′01″N 1°03′10″E		1085635	Upload Photo	Q26373574
Harbledown and Rough War Memorial, Including Steps and Gate	II	Church Hill, Harbledown, CT2 8NW	war memorial		7 May 2019	TR1320458111; 51°16′56″N 1°03′21″E		1463079	Harbledown and Rough War Memorial, Including Steps and Gate More images	Q66480115
Piece of Wall Belonging to the Original St Nicholas's Hospital	II	Church Hill, Harbledown			14 March 1980	TR1302158189; 51°16′59″N 1°03′12″E		1336556	Upload Photo	Q26621040
Retaining Walls to Black Prince's Well	II	Church Hill, Harbledown			14 March 1980	TR1295358162; 51°16′58″N 1°03′08″E		1336557	Upload Photo	Q26621041
The Gateway of St Nicholas's Hospital and St Nicholas's Farmhouse	II	Church Hill, Harbledown			29 September 1952	TR1303058202; 51°16′59″N 1°03′12″E		1085633	Upload Photo	Q26373563
The Old Rectory	II	Lanfranc Gardens, Summer Hill, Harbledown			14 March 1980	TR1324858122; 51°16′56″N 1°03′23″E		1068736	Upload Photo	Q26321431
Hopebourne	II	London Road, Harbledown			29 September 1952	TR1280258191; 51°16′59″N 1°03′00″E		1336520	Upload Photo	Q26621005
Neal's Place	II	Neal's Place Road, Neal's Place			14 March 1980	TR1310058834; 51°17′20″N 1°03′17″E		1085637	Upload Photo	Q26373586
Havisham House	II	Palmers Cross Hill, Upper Harbledown			14 March 1980	TR1242358293; 51°17′03″N 1°02′41″E		1356129	Upload Photo	Q26638824
Moat House	II	Rough Common Road, Moat House			14 March 1980	TR1283159512; 51°17′42″N 1°03′05″E		1336583	Upload Photo	Q26621065
Pennyless Bench	II	1, Summer Hill, Harbledown			14 March 1980	TR1344057993; 51°16′52″N 1°03′33″E		1336521	Upload Photo	Q26621006
2, Summer Hill	II	2, Summer Hill, Harbledown			14 March 1980	TR1342658018; 51°16′53″N 1°03′32″E		1068761	Upload Photo	Q26321456
3-9, Summer Hill	II	3-9, Summer Hill, Harbledown			14 March 1980	TR1340258028; 51°16′53″N 1°03′31″E		1085638	Upload Photo	Q26373591
Grove Cottage	II	10, Summer Hill, Harbledown			14 March 1980	TR1337358043; 51°16′54″N 1°03′30″E		1085639	Upload Photo	Q26373597
Harbledown Place	II	11-14, Summer Hill, Harbledown			30 January 1967	TR1333658046; 51°16′54″N 1°03′28″E		1343686	Upload Photo	Q26627467
Chestnut Cottage and Rosemount	II	15 and 16, Summer Hill, Harbledown			14 March 1980	TR1331258051; 51°16′54″N 1°03′26″E		1085640	Upload Photo	Q26373601
Harbledown Court	II	17, Summer Hill, Harbledown			14 March 1980	TR1329558054; 51°16′54″N 1°03′26″E		1068783	Upload Photo	Q26321477
Claverings	II	Summer Hill, Harbledown			14 March 1980	TR1315158092; 51°16′55″N 1°03′18″E		1085641	Upload Photo	Q26373606
13-16, the Mint	II	13-16, The Mint, Harbledown			14 March 1980	TR1310058121; 51°16′56″N 1°03′16″E		1356126	Upload Photo	Q26638821
New Cottages	II	1-6, Upper Harbledown			14 March 1980	TR1128658411; 51°17′08″N 1°01′43″E		1085642	Upload Photo	Q26373610
Willow Cottages	II	1 and 2, Upper Harbledown			14 March 1980	TR1177858269; 51°17′03″N 1°02′08″E		1085644	Upload Photo	Q26373622
Poldhurst Manor	II	Upper Harbledown			14 March 1980	TR1112258116; 51°16′59″N 1°01′34″E		1068792	Upload Photo	Q26321487
Upper Harbledown House	II	Upper Harbledown			1 October 1975	TR1131358406; 51°17′08″N 1°01′44″E		1068788	Upload Photo	Q26321484
Willow Farmhouse and the Granary Or Oasthouse Adjoining	II	Upper Harbledown			14 March 1980	TR1175258342; 51°17′05″N 1°02′07″E		1085643	Upload Photo	Q26373616
Woodside House	II	Upper Harbledown			2 May 1978	TR1072758510; 51°17′12″N 1°01′14″E		1356109	Upload Photo	Q26638806

== See also ==
- Grade I listed buildings in Kent
- Grade II* listed buildings in Kent

== Sources ==
- Newman, John (2013) [1969], Kent: North-East and East, The Buildings of England, New Haven and London: Yale University Press, ISBN 978-0-300-18506-5
