= Rough Common =

Village in Kent, England

Coordinates: 51.293°N 1.0485°E

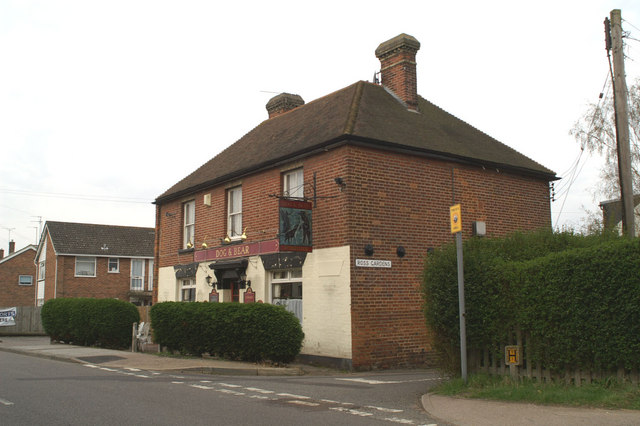
- The Dog and Bear public house

- Location within Kent
- District: City of Canterbury
- Shire county: Kent
- Region: South East
- Country: England
- Sovereign state: United Kingdom
- Post town: CANTERBURY
- Postcode district: CT2
- Dialling code: 01227
- Police: Kent
- Fire: Kent
- Ambulance: South East Coast

Rough Common is a village in Canterbury in the parish of Harbledown, Kent, England. It forms part of the civil parish of Harbledown and Rough Common.
