= Listed buildings in Bapchild =

Civil Parish in Kent, England

Bapchild is a village and civil parish in the Swale District of Kent, England. It contains five listed buildings that are recorded in the National Heritage List for England. Of these one is grade I and four are grade II.

This list is based on the information retrieved online from Historic England.

== Key ==
Grade	Criteria
I	Buildings that are of exceptional interest
II*	Particularly important buildings of more than special interest
II	Buildings that are of special interest

== Listing ==
Name	Grade	Location	Type	Completed (Note: The date given is the date used by Historic England as significant for the initial building or that of an important part in the structure's description.)	Date designated	Grid ref. (Note: The grid reference is based on the British national grid reference system, sometimes known as OSGB36, used by the Ordnance Survey.) Geo-coordinates	Notes	Entry number (Note: The "List Entry Number" is a unique number assigned to each listed building and scheduled monument by Historic England.)	Image	Wikidata
1, School Lane	II	1, School Lane			19 June 1995	TQ9281963138; 51°20′05″N 0°46′00″E		1253519	Upload Photo	Q26545265
Church of St Lawrence	I	School Lane	church building		24 January 1967	TQ9272962968; 51°19′59″N 0°45′55″E		1115459	Church of St Lawrence More images	Q17530079
Morris Court Farmhouse	II	School Lane			27 August 1952	TQ9286962651; 51°19′49″N 0°46′01″E		1069324	Upload Photo	Q26322215
35, the Street	II	35, The Street			16 March 1977	TQ9297463130; 51°20′04″N 0°46′08″E		1115443	Upload Photo	Q26409173
The Post Office	II	The Street			21 March 1985	TQ9292063140; 51°20′05″N 0°46′05″E		1343896	Upload Photo	Q26627663

== See also ==
- Grade I listed buildings in Kent
- Grade II* listed buildings in Kent

== Sources ==
- Newman, John (2013) [1969], Kent: North-East and East, The Buildings of England, New Haven and London: Yale University Press, ISBN 978-0-300-18506-5
