= Listed buildings in Rodmersham =

Historic structures in Kent, England

Rodmersham is a village and civil parish in the Swale District of Kent, England. It contains 20 listed buildings that are recorded in the National Heritage List for England. Of these one is grade I and 19 are grade II.

This list is based on the information retrieved online from Historic England.

== Key ==
Grade	Criteria
I	Buildings that are of exceptional interest
II*	Particularly important buildings of more than special interest
II	Buildings that are of special interest

== Listing ==
Name	Grade	Location	Type	Completed (Note: The date given is the date used by Historic England as significant for the initial building or that of an important part in the structure's description.)	Date designated	Grid ref. (Note: The grid reference is based on the British national grid reference system, sometimes known as OSGB36, used by the Ordnance Survey.) Geo-coordinates	Notes	Entry number (Note: The "List Entry Number" is a unique number assigned to each listed building and scheduled monument by Historic England.)	Image	Wikidata
Holly Tree Lodge	II				27 August 1952	TQ9169761389; 51°19′09″N 0°44′59″E		1069291	Upload Photo	Q26322153
Dungate House	II	Bargains Hill Road			21 March 1985	TQ9183059598; 51°18′11″N 0°45′02″E		1343919	Upload Photo	Q26627685
Barn at Tq 921 618	II	Church Street			21 March 1985	TQ9210561748; 51°19′21″N 0°45′20″E		1120908	Upload Photo	Q26414104
Church Cottage	II	Church Street			21 March 1985	TQ9262961831; 51°19′23″N 0°45′47″E		1069287	Upload Photo	Q26322145
Church House	II	Church Street			24 January 1967	TQ9263461880; 51°19′24″N 0°45′48″E		1323761	Upload Photo	Q26609460
Church of St Nicholas	I	Church Street	church building		24 January 1967	TQ9259761809; 51°19′22″N 0°45′46″E		1120902	Church of St Nicholas More images	Q17530081
Matsons	II	Church Street			24 January 1967	TQ9269361846; 51°19′23″N 0°45′51″E		1343920	Upload Photo	Q26627686
Rodmersham House	II	Church Street			24 January 1967	TQ9233961563; 51°19′14″N 0°45′32″E		1069288	Upload Photo	Q26322147
Barn at Dungate	II	Dungate			21 March 1985	TQ9165659322; 51°18′03″N 0°44′52″E		1120916	Upload Photo	Q26414111
Stanley Villas	II	1-2, Highsted Road			13 December 1974	TQ9096961280; 51°19′07″N 0°44′21″E		1343921	Upload Photo	Q26627687
Highsted Farmhouse	II	Highsted Road			13 December 1974	TQ9083761405; 51°19′11″N 0°44′14″E		1069289	Upload Photo	Q26322149
Old Cottage	II	Highsted Road			13 December 1974	TQ9101061080; 51°19′00″N 0°44′23″E		1120885	Upload Photo	Q26414085
Vine Cottages	II	3, Rodmersham Green			10 February 1976	TQ9159061332; 51°19′08″N 0°44′53″E		1120864	Upload Photo	Q26414067
Baker Cottages	II	Rodmersham Green			10 February 1976	TQ9172461305; 51°19′07″N 0°45′00″E		1069290	Upload Photo	Q26322151
Orsett House	II	Rodmersham Green			10 February 1976	TQ9161861373; 51°19′09″N 0°44′54″E		1069292	Upload Photo	Q26322155
Pardoners Cottage	II	Rodmersham Green			10 February 1976	TQ9169961343; 51°19′08″N 0°44′59″E		1323137	Upload Photo	Q26608889
Victoria House	II	Rodmersham Green			10 February 1976	TQ9164061404; 51°19′10″N 0°44′56″E		1323163	Upload Photo	Q26608914
Barn 20 Yards East of Orchard Farmhouse	II	Upper Rodmersham			21 March 1985	TQ9280960790; 51°18′49″N 0°45′55″E		1069253	Upload Photo	Q26322089
Hill Farm	II	Upper Rodmersham			21 March 1985	TQ9265560854; 51°18′51″N 0°45′47″E		1069293	Upload Photo	Q26322157
Orchard Farmhouse	II	Upper Rodmersham			21 March 1985	TQ9277760806; 51°18′49″N 0°45′53″E		1069294	Upload Photo	Q26322159

== See also ==
- Grade I listed buildings in Kent
- Grade II* listed buildings in Kent

== Sources ==
- Newman, John (2013) [1969], Kent: North-East and East, The Buildings of England, New Haven and London: Yale University Press, ISBN 978-0-300-18506-5
