= Highsted =

Village in Kent, England

Coordinates: 51.3207°N 0.7388°E

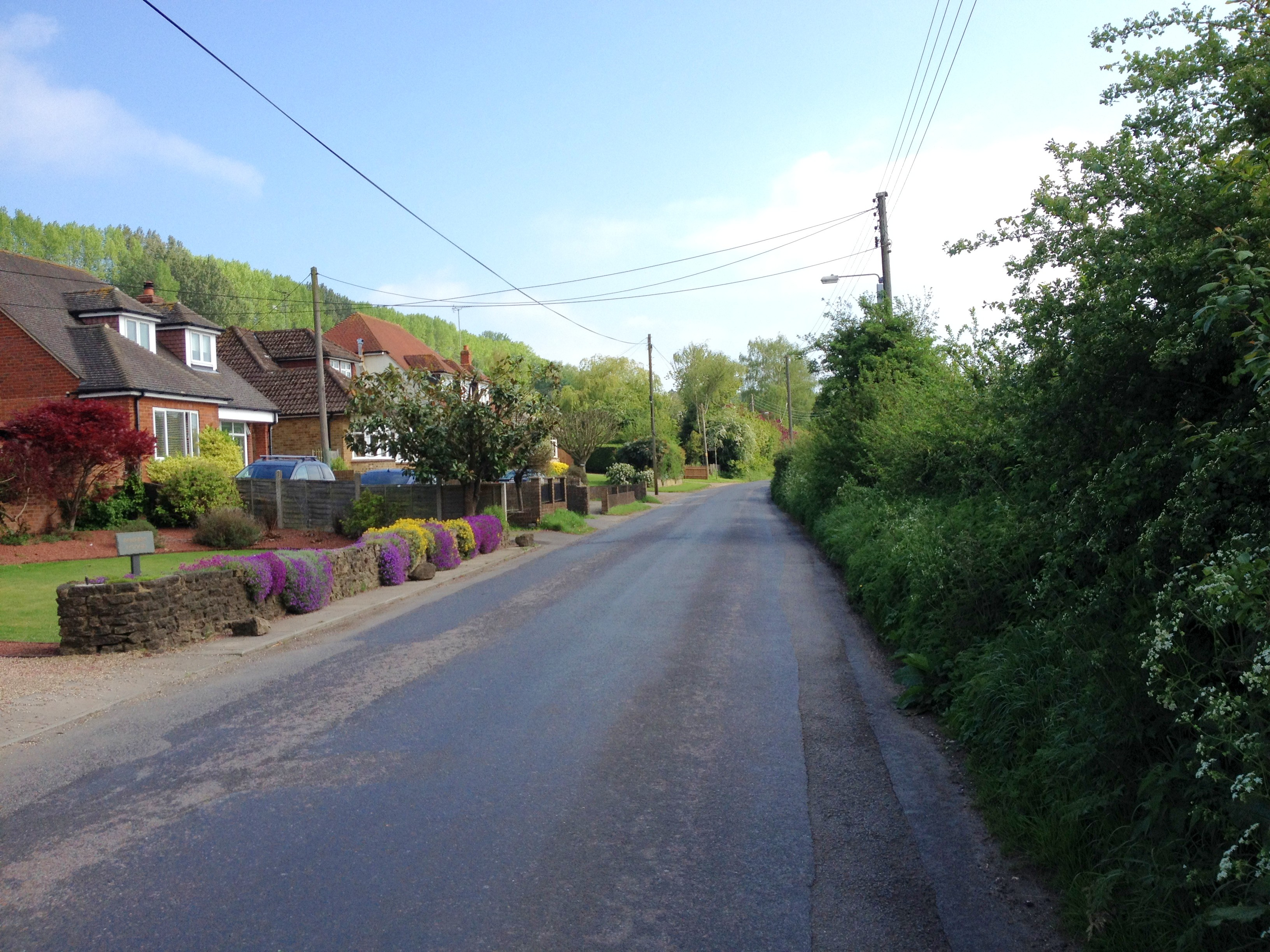
- Highsted Valley (road)

- Location within Kent
- District: Swale
- Shire county: Kent
- Region: South East
- Country: England
- Sovereign state: United Kingdom
- Post town: Sittingbourne
- Postcode district: ME9
- Police: Kent
- Fire: Kent
- Ambulance: South East Coast

Highsted is a village near Sittingbourne in Kent, England. It is in the civil parish of Rodmersham.

Most of the village is on Highsted Valley road leading northwards towards Cromer's Wood. The rest of the village is on Stockers Hill leading eastwards to Rodmersham Green.

According to Edward Hasted, in 1798, the estate of 'Hysted Forstall' with 'Chilston' and 'Fulston' were on the boundary of the Parish of Sittingbourne. Latterly, the manors of Chilston and Fulston have been absorbed into the outer suburbs of Sittingbourne in post-1940s house building.

Highsted contains three listed buildings, 'Highsted Farmhouse',(Grade II listed), 'Stanley Villas'(also Grade II listed) and 'Old Cottage' (also Grade II listed)

On the Broadoak Road (between Tunstall and Milstead), is the Kent Science Park.

Woodstock Sports F.C. 'The TClarke Stadium' is on the Broadoak Road as well.
