= Harbledown =

Village in Kent, England

Coordinates: 51.283°N 1.054°E

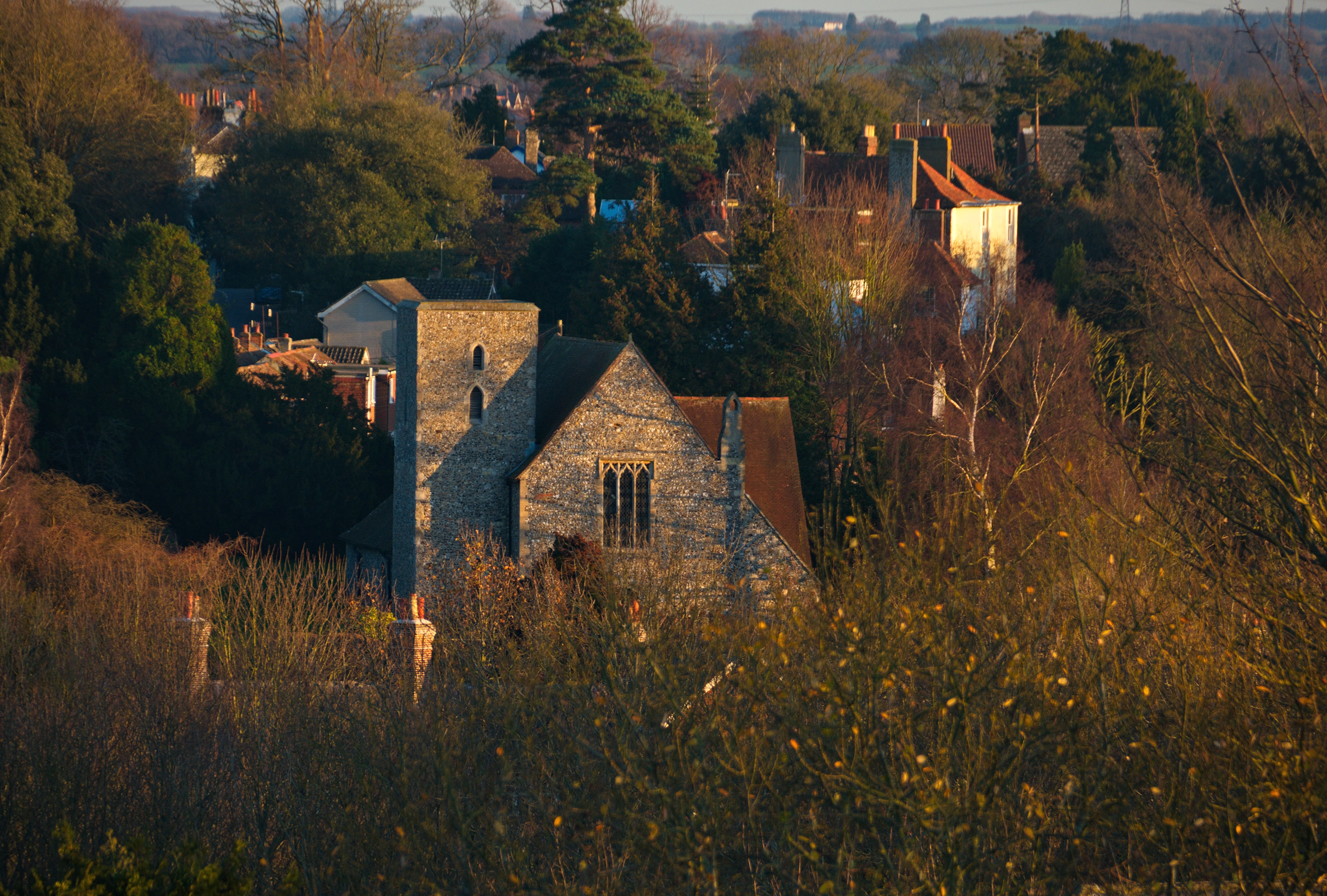
- St Nicholas' Church in Harbledown

- Location within Kent
- Area: 2.92 sq mi (7.6 km^{2})
- Population: 2,656 (2011 Ward)
  - Density: 910/sq mi (350/km^{2})
- OS grid reference: TR130579
- Civil parish: Harbledown and Rough Common
- District: City of Canterbury
- Shire county: Kent
- Region: South East
- Country: England
- Sovereign state: United Kingdom
- Post town: CANTERBURY
- Postcode district: CT2
- Dialling code: 01227
- Police: Kent
- Fire: Kent
- Ambulance: South East Coast
- UK Parliament: Canterbury

Harbledown is a village in the Canterbury district, in Kent, England, immediately west of Canterbury and contiguous with the city. At local government level the village is designated as a separate civil parish, that of Harbledown and Rough Common, which was renamed from Harbledown in 2007. The High Street is a conservation area with many listed buildings, including a tall and intact Georgian terrace on the south side. The area includes several orchards for fruit on its outskirts, within the parish boundaries.

== Etymology ==
Toponymists have determined that the village name means "Herebeald's hill".

A popular story is that the place was dubbed "hobble down", after Henry II of England walked barefoot through Harbledown on a pilgrimage to Canterbury Cathedral, in repentance for his mistaken involvement in the murder of Thomas Becket.

Another suggestion is that since the name has been recorded as Herbaldoun, it is possible that the name is related to the herbs growing in the hills. "The spot is remarked to be peculiarly healthful, and herbalists are said to come every year to collect medicinal plants which grow only on that particular place." For this reason the leprosy hospital was founded on this spot.

However Judith Glover in "The Place Names of Kent" gives the earliest rendition of the place names as Herebealding dun which would be AngloSaxon as Herebeald's Hill, Herebolddune in 1175, Herebaldon in 1196, Herbeldon in 1229 and established as Harbledoune in 1610.

== History and churches ==
The Parish Church of St Michael and All Angels is compact and attractive but more significant is the Hospital of St Nicholas: this is now an Almshouse with a range of cottages for elderly people. Formerly, it was a leper hospital whose inmates supported themselves by displaying a slipper that had been worn by St Thomas Becket; passing pilgrims would leave a donation for the privilege of seeing it.

The leper's hospital was founded in 1085 by Archbishop Lanfranc; "the hospital and well can still be seen". The old leper church of St Nicholas, built at about the same time, is a Grade I listed property; the summary states: "a late-C11 building with C12 and C14 additions ... a very well-preserved Norman and later medieval church". According to Kent County Council, the church and its buildings were converted into almshouses in 1859; that use continued until 1900. The buildings were "rebuilt in 1685 and again in 1840".

As you enter the Hospital of St Nicholas a plaque reads:

"This ancient Hospital of St Nicholas Harbledown was founded by Archbishop Lanfranc c. 1084 for the relief of Lepers. On the disappearance of Leprosy from England Lanfranc's foundation gradually developed into the Almshouses of today. The main door of the church is kept locked for security reasons but the interior of the building can be seen by appointment with the Sub Prior. Visitors are invited to walk in the grounds of the Hospital."

There is thought to be a reference to the village of Harbledown towards the close of Geoffrey Chaucer's Canterbury Tales. In the Prologue to the Manciple's tale, the pilgrims are said to near Bobbe-up-and-doun, | Under the Blee, in Canterbury Weye.

== Early cricket ==
Richard Culmer (1597–1662), a Puritan clergyman who had been suspended from his duties in 1635, was restored to the clergy in 1638 as a curate. He was sent to the Parish of Harbledown to assist the Reverend Austin. Culmer, known as "Blue Dick" because he always wore a blue gown, was vindictive towards drunkenness and Sabbath sports. Cricket at this time was played at an inter-parish level only in the south-eastern counties but there had been a number of ecclesiastical cases in which people playing the game on a Sunday were prosecuted. Whereas Culmer had managed to suppress Sabbath sport in other places, he was less successful in Harbledown where the parishioners provoked him by "crickit playing before his door, to spite him".

Having failed to stop cricket in the village by private remonstrances, Culmer in 1640 publicly denounced the sport as "profane", especially if played on a Sunday. This is one of cricket's earliest known references.

Organised Kent cricket was first established in 1835 in the nearby village of Hackington, with the formation of the club which became (by 1842) the Kent County Cricket Club.

== Demography ==
2001 census: Harbledown compared
	Harbledown	Canterbury district	England
Population	2,593	135,278	49,138,831
Foreign born	11.9%	7.6%	9.2%
White	94.3%	96.6%	90.9%
Asian	2.8%	1.5%	4.6%
Black	0.8%	0.5%	2.3%
Christian	73.3%	73.3%	72%
Muslim	0.6%	0.6%	3.1%
Hindu	0.4%	0.4%	1.1%
No religion	15.7%	16.7%	15%
Unemployed	1.5%	2.7%	3.3%
Retired	17.9%	15.2%	13.5%

At the 2001 UK census, the Harbledown electoral ward, which includes part of Chartham, had a population of 2,593. The ethnicity was 94.3% white, 1.2% mixed race, 2.8% Asian, 0.8% black and 0.9% other. The place of birth of residents was 88.1% United Kingdom, 0.8% Republic of Ireland, 3.1% other Western European countries, and 8% elsewhere. Religion was recorded as 73.3% Christian, 0.5% Buddhist, 0.4% Hindu, 0.2% Sikh, 0.2% Jewish and 0.6% Muslim. 15.7% were recorded as having no religion, 0.7% had an alternative religion and 8.5% did not state their religion.

The economic activity of residents aged 16–74 was 35.9% in full-time employment, 12.7% in part-time employment, 11.3% self-employed, 1.5% unemployed, 2.3% students with jobs, 8.3% students without jobs, 17.9% retired, 4.9% looking after home or family, 3.3% permanently sick or disabled and 1.9% economically inactive for other reasons. The industry of employment of residents was 15.1% retail, 8.2% manufacturing, 5.8% construction, 12% real estate, 10.8% health and social work, 24.1% education, 4.6% transport and communications, 6.7% public administration, 2.7% hotels and restaurants, 2.9% finance, 2.6% agriculture and 4.5% other. Compared with national figures, the ward had a relatively high proportion of workers in education and agriculture. There were a relatively low proportion in manufacturing, hotels and restaurants, and transport and communications. Of the ward's residents aged 16–74, 31.3% had a higher education qualification or the equivalent, compared with 19.9% nationwide.

== Gallery ==
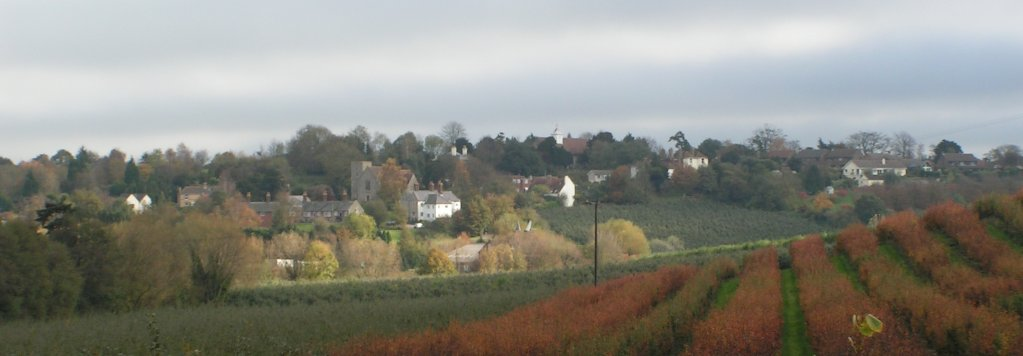
Harbledown across the orchards which surround it
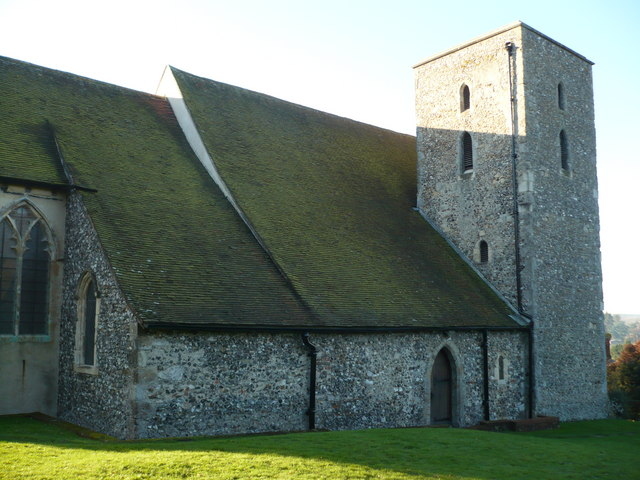
St Nicholas' Church, Harbledown, a former leper church

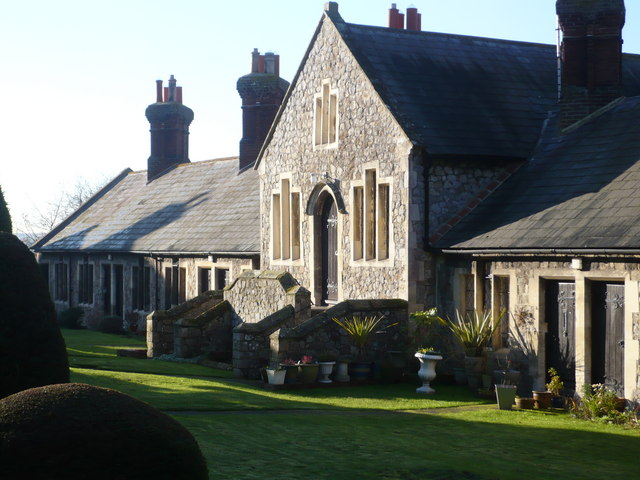
Almshouses at St Nicholas' Hospital

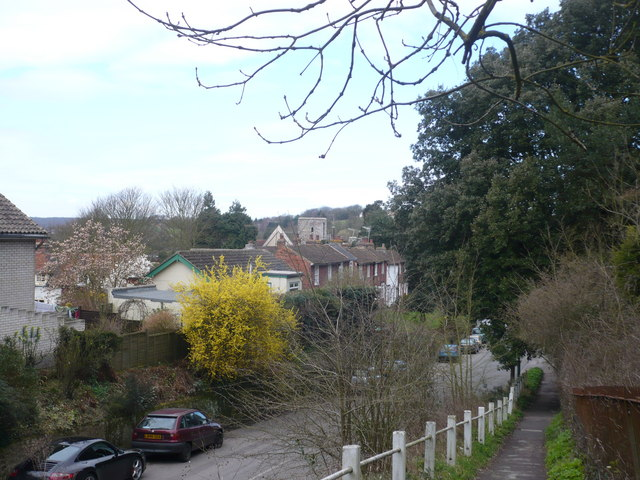
Church Hill

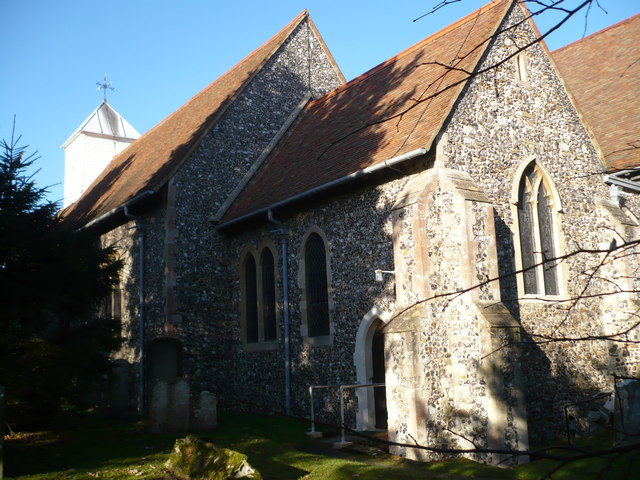
St Michael & All Angels Anglican Church, Harbledown

== See also ==
- Upper Harbledown
- Listed buildings in Harbledown and Rough Common
