= List of M2 roads =

This is a list of roads designated M2:

== Europe ==
- M2 motorway (Great Britain), a motorway in England
- M2 expressway (Hungary), a motorway in Hungary
- N2 road (Ireland)#M2 motorway, a motorway in the Republic of Ireland
- M-2 highway (Montenegro), a motorway in Montenegro
- M2 motorway (Northern Ireland), a motorway in Northern Ireland
- Highway M02 (Ukraine)

== Asia ==
- M2 motorway (Pakistan), a motorway in Pakistan
- M2 highway (Russia), a motorway in Russia

== Africa ==
- M2 (Johannesburg), a Metropolitan Route in Johannesburg, South Africa
- M2 (Pretoria), a Metropolitan Route in Pretoria, South Africa
- M2 road (Zambia), a road in Zambia
- M2 road (Malawi), a road in Malawi

== See also ==
- List of highways numbered 2

== Australia ==
=== New South Wales ===
- M2 Hills Motorway, a motorway in Sydney, Australia (part of the M2 route)
- Lane Cove Tunnel, a tunnel in Sydney
- M2 (Sydney), a motorway route in Sydney, Australia

=== Queensland ===
- Ipswich Motorway and Logan Motorways in Brisbane, Australia

=== South Australia ===
- Northern Expressway, in Adelaide, Australia
- Southern Expressway, in Adelaide, Australia

=== Victoria ===
- Tullamarine Freeway in Melbourne, Australia
- CityLink Tollway in Melbourne, Australia

== See also ==
- List of highways numbered 2
