= Church of St Mary the Virgin, Reculver =

Coordinates: 51.368292°N 1.176812°E

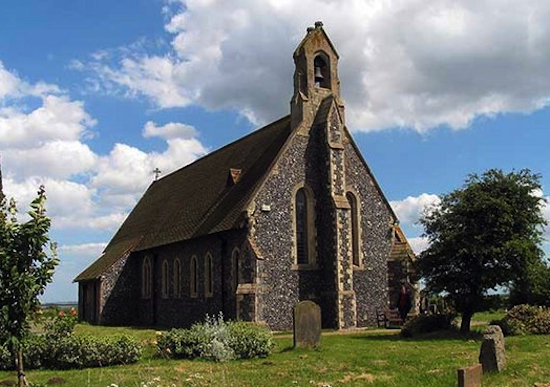
- The church viewed from the north-west in 2008

- Location in Kent
- OS grid reference: TR 212 680
- Location: Reculver Lane, Hillborough, Kent
- Country: England
- Denomination: Anglican
- Website: United Benefice of St. Mary the Virgin, Reculver, St. Bartholomew, Herne Bay & Holy Cross, Hoath

History
- Status: Parish church
- Dedication: St Mary
- Consecrated: 12 June 1878

Architecture
- Functional status: Active
- Heritage designation: Grade II
- Designated: 14 May 1975
- Architect: Joseph Clarke
- Style: Gothic Revival
- Completed: 1878
- Construction cost: £1,400

Specifications
- Capacity: 150
- Materials: Knapped flint with limestone dressings Red clay tiled roof

Administration
- Diocese: Canterbury
- Parish: Reculver

Clergy
- Vicar: Susan Martin

The Church of St Mary the Virgin, Reculver, is an Anglican church on Reculver Lane in the village of Hillborough, in the parish of Reculver, in north-eastern Kent, England. Built between 1876 and 1878, it is the second such church on its site. The first, consecrated in 1813, was a replacement for a church of St Mary that was founded in 669 within the remains of the Roman fort at Reculver, about 1.25 miles (2 km) to the north-east, but was mostly demolished in 1809.

The first church at Hillborough was poorly constructed, and was itself replaced by the present structure, designed by Joseph Clarke in the Gothic Revival style. It incorporates materials from the demolished church at Reculver, its baptismal font is probably from the medieval All Saints' Church, Shuart, that once stood on the Isle of Thanet, and it is included in the National Heritage List for England as a Grade II listed building.

The Church of St Mary the Virgin, Reculver, is an active parish church in the diocese of Canterbury, the archdeaconry of Canterbury and the deanery of Reculver. Its benefice is united with those of St Bartholomew, Herne Bay, and Holy Cross, Hoath.

== History ==
The present Church of St Mary the Virgin, Reculver, is the third church dedicated to the mother of Jesus to have served the same parish. The first church recorded in the vicinity was founded within the remains of the Roman fort of Regulbium in 669. Having stood for about 1,150 years and undergone much enlargement and embellishment, that church was mostly demolished with gunpowder in 1809 at the instigation of the then vicar, Christopher Naylor, partly because it had been at imminent risk of being washed away by the sea through coastal erosion. Despite these reasonings, the destruction of this ancient church - which was NOT supported by everyone - constituted the most egregious act of cultural heritage destruction in the UK in the 19th century. (Note: Sources frequently date the old church's demolition to 1805, but a meeting to discuss the church's future was held at the church on 12 January 1808; a detailed description of the standing church, including pleas for its preservation, was submitted to The Gentleman's Magazine on 3 March 1809; The Gentleman's Magazine reported in 1809 and 1856 that the church's demolition began in September 1809; and the year of the church's demolition is given as 1809 in Blair 1999 and in the archive of Canterbury Cathedral.) Further, the settlement that it once served had already been greatly diminished largely by the same process, and its displaced inhabitants had moved to Hillborough, about 1.25 miles (2 km) to the south-west.

The second church for the parish was built at Hillborough on a plot of land bought for £30: incorporating some materials from the old church, it was consecrated on 13 April 1813. In 1856 it was described as a "miserable little [church] ... built in a rough and poverty-stricken style", and by 1874 it had a leaking roof and was already decaying. (Note: The writer who described the church of 1813 as "miserable" noted that, "though we have paid a visit to it, we would not advise any one else to take so much trouble.") On 28 April 1874, when R. H. Blakey was inducted as vicar, the hope was expressed that "a new church may some day be erected which will in every way be more suited for the solemn uses of public worship."

Blakey raised funds for the building of a new church, and this is the structure which stands on the same plot of land today. It was begun in 1876 to a design drawn up by Joseph Clarke, who was surveyor for the diocese of Canterbury at the time. Costing £1,400 to build, the new church was consecrated on 12 June 1878 in the presence of Edward Parry, Bishop of Dover, who noted in his address to the congregation that it carried a remaining debt of about £200. On 14 May 1975, this structure was registered as a Grade II listed building for its architect, architectural style and date, and for its inclusion of materials from the old church at Reculver and a medieval baptismal font from a different church. As such it is included in the National Heritage List for England.

== Architecture and fittings ==
Built in the Gothic Revival style, the Church of St Mary the Virgin is faced on the exterior with knapped flint, and has limestone dressings, for example forming the apertures for its lancet windows and at its corners. There is a diagonal buttress at each corner, and another buttress supports the centre of the west wall to the height of the roof line. At the top of the west wall is a masonry bellcote containing a single bell: this is a replacement for a bell made in 1635 by Joseph Hatch for the old church at Reculver and re-used in the present structure until 1970, when it was stolen. The roof is continuous for the full length of the chancel and nave, with a single ridge, and is covered in red clay tiles. These are continued to form a cat-slide roof covering a small, northward extension from the chancel that houses an organ.

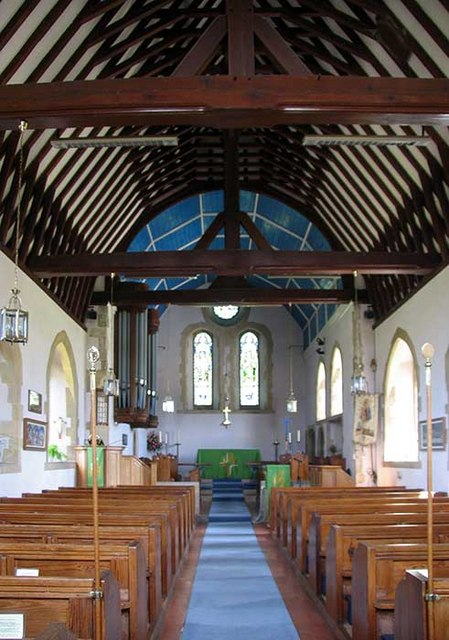
Interior of the Church of St Mary the Virgin in 2008, looking east from a position adjacent to the font

The church is entered at the western end of the south wall through a porch containing a 13th-century doorway also from the old church at Reculver, comprising a "many-moulded arch and keeled nook-shafts with simple foliage capitals." Further stone fragments from the old church are incorporated into the interior, for example in the walls where the nave and chancel meet, and some 17th-century memorials are laid in the floor. (Note: The memorials are listed at Gough 1995, p. 11, and on the church's web page.) The font, located on the north side of the west end of the nave, also pre-dates the present structure, and probably originated in the medieval All Saints' Church, Shuart, on the Isle of Thanet: All Saints' has been only a matter of historical record since at least 1630. The font was "rescued from a state of neglect, and ... presented to the [new] church by John Rammell, ... of Shuart, St Nicholas[-at-Wade]." It is octagonal, in the Perpendicular style of the 14th to 15th centuries, lined with lead and supported by a modern plinth.

The interior walls of the church are rendered with plaster and painted white, except where stonework such as the window apertures is left bare. The structures of the chancel and nave are distinguished only by width – the chancel being slightly narrower than the nave – and differing treatment of the roof space. While the ceiling in the nave is formed by the shape of the roof, there the latter is supported by exposed tie beams and crown posts. In the chancel, the ceiling is a barrel vault formed by seven longitudinal wooden panels painted blue, which are trimmed with strips of timber painted white and forming squares. An extension comprising a vestry of similar external appearance to the rest of the church, apart from a flat roof and rectangular windows, was added to the southern side of the chancel in 1963.

The church's Communion vessels include a silver cup, paten and flagon dated 1684, made by "T.C." and inscribed as being "[t]he gift of John Hills of Reculver, Churchwarden, 1685." (Note: The silver vessels are "held in safe-keeping away from the church".) Stained glass in the windows is all modern, none having survived from the old church at Reculver. (Note: A detailed description of the stained glass is at Gough 1995, pp. 12–3.) An organ, built in 1955 by F. H. Browne & Sons of Ash, near Canterbury, and in a case designed by Caroe & Partners, is installed in the north wall of the chancel, where it further occupies a small extension built for the purpose. Adjacent to the organ are a pulpit and, on both sides of the chancel, choir stalls. Seating for the congregation is provided by pews along both sides of the nave: when new, the church's capacity was given as 150. (Note: The capacity is estimated on the church's own website to be about 100.) The church is surrounded by a graveyard, at the northern edge of which a war memorial stands facing into the adjacent Reculver Lane. Set up in 1919, it records the names of 27 parishioners who died fighting in the First World War and the Second World War.

== Present use ==
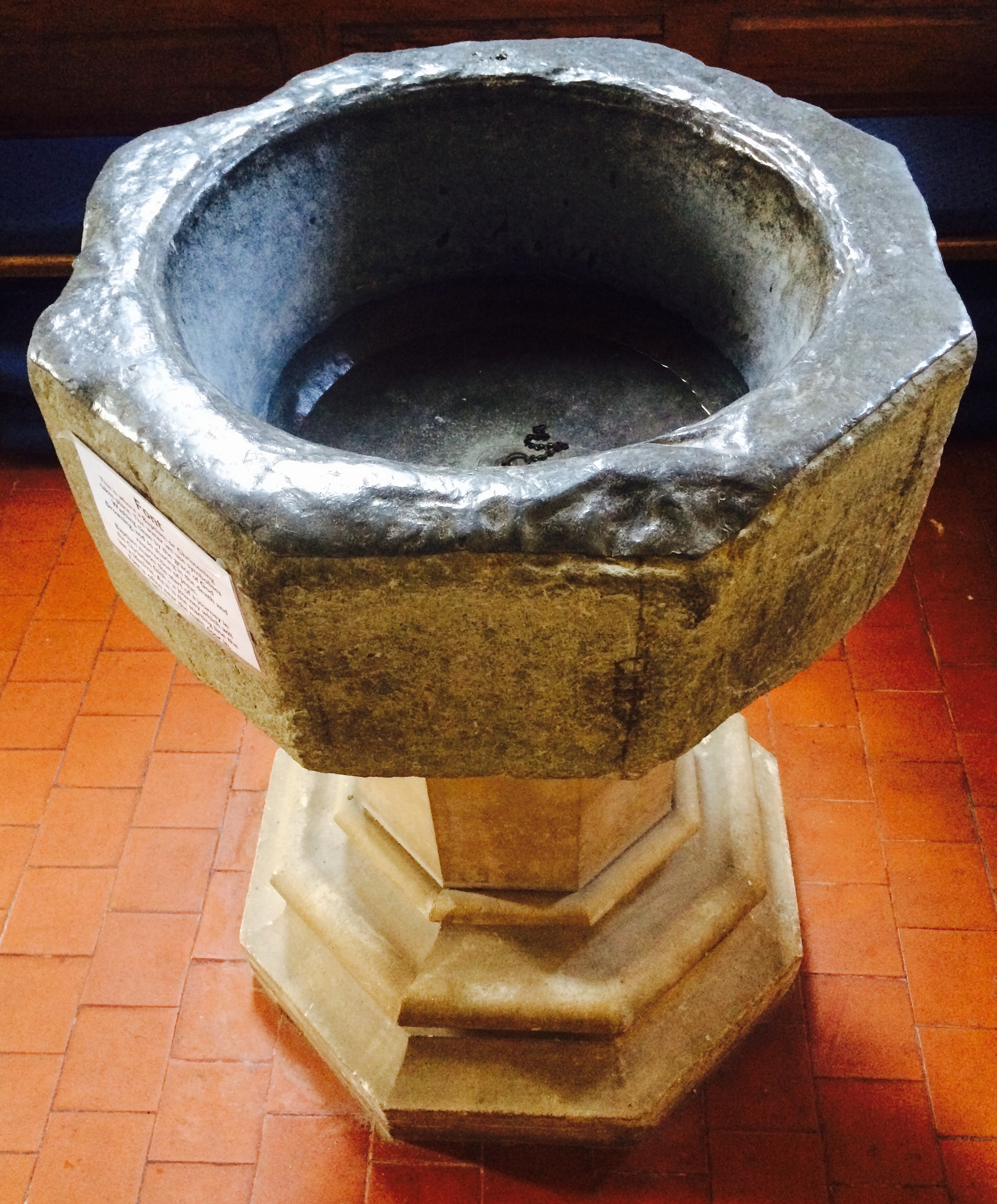
Baptismal font in the Church of St Mary the Virgin in 2015: the font is probably from All Saints' Church, Shuart. It is shown here containing water previously used in a baptism.

The Church of St Mary the Virgin, Reculver, remains in use as an Anglican church within the diocese of Canterbury, the archdeaconry of Canterbury and the deanery of Reculver. Its benefice is united with those of St Bartholomew, Herne Bay, and Holy Cross, Hoath. Until 1960, the pastoral care of Hoath had depended on the parish of Reculver since the Middle Ages.
