= St Mary's Church, Reculver =

Ruined church in Kent, England

Coordinates: 51.3796°N 1.1995°E

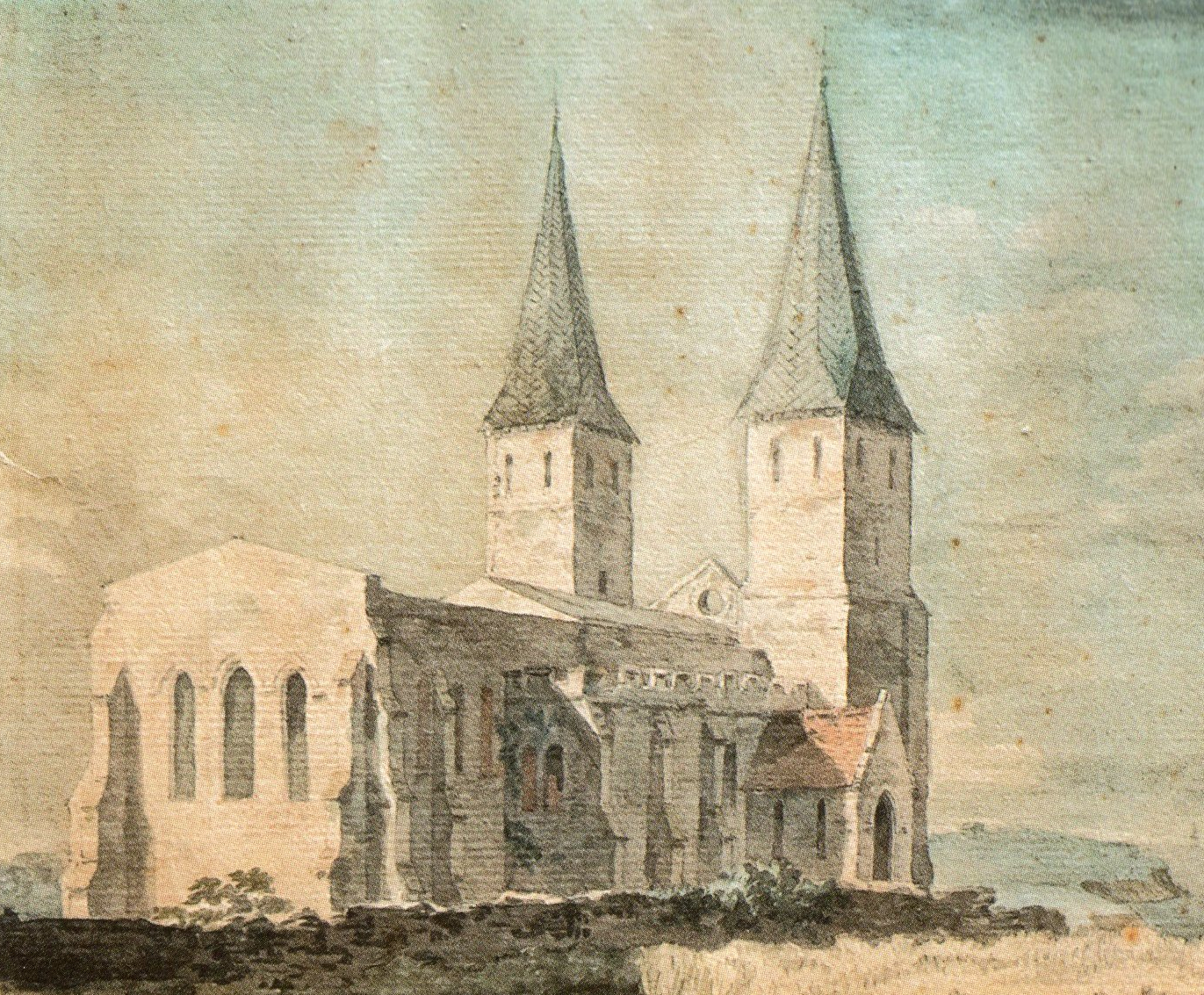
Watercolour of St Mary's Church in 1755, viewed from the north-east

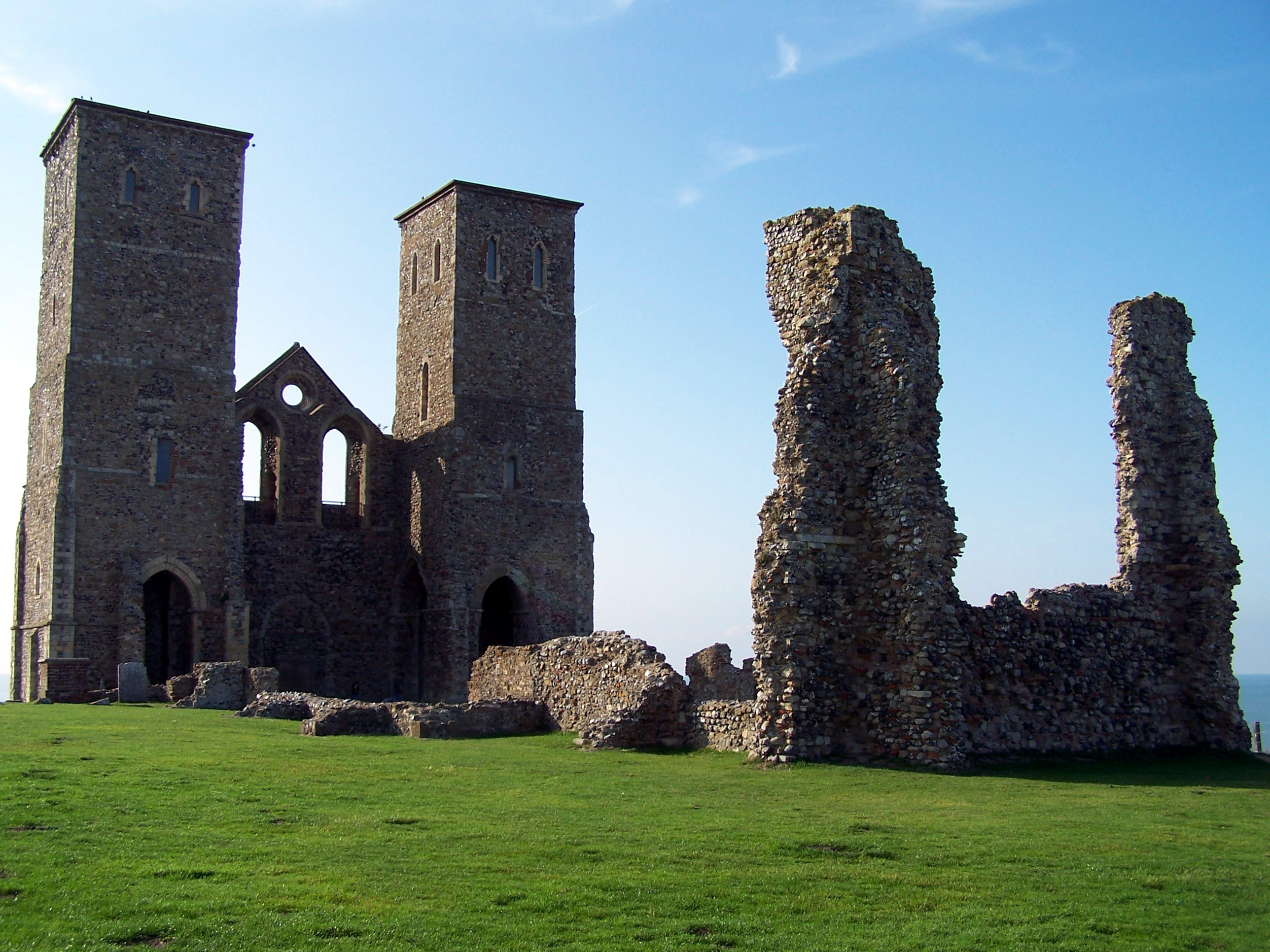
The ruined church today

St Mary's Church, Reculver, was founded in the 7th century as either a minster or a monastery on the site of Regulbium, the Roman fort at Reculver, which was then at the north-eastern extremity of Kent in south-eastern England. In 669, the site of the fort was given for this purpose by King Ecgberht of Kent to a priest named Bassa, beginning a connection with Kentish kings that led to King Eadberht II of Kent being buried there in the 760s, and the church becoming very wealthy by the beginning of the 9th century. From the early 9th century to the 11th the church was treated as essentially a piece of property, with control passing between kings of Mercia, Wessex and England and the archbishops of Canterbury. Viking attacks may have extinguished the church's religious community in the 9th century, although an early 11th-century record indicates that the church was then in the hands of a dean accompanied by monks. By the time of Domesday Book, completed in 1086, St Mary's was serving as a parish church.

The original building, which incorporated stone and tiles scavenged from the Roman fort, was a simple one consisting only of a nave and an apsidal chancel, with a small room, or porticus, built out from each of the church's northern and southern sides where the nave and chancel met. The church was much altered and expanded during the Middle Ages, including the addition of twin towers in the 12th century; the last addition, in the 15th century, was of north and south porches leading into the nave. This expansion coincided with a long period of prosperity for the settlement of Reculver: the settlement's decline led to the church's decay and, following unsuccessful attempts to prevent the erosion of the adjacent coastline, the building was almost completely demolished in 1809.

The church's remains were preserved by the intervention of Trinity House in 1810, since the towers had long been important as a landmark for shipping: preservation was achieved through the first effective effort to protect the cliff on which the church then stood from further erosion. Some materials from the structure were incorporated into a replacement church, also dedicated to St Mary, built at Hillborough in the same parish. Much of the rest was used for the building of a new harbour wall at Margate, known as Margate Pier. Other, surviving remnants include fragments of a high cross of stone that once stood inside the church, and two stone columns from a triple arch between the nave and chancel: the columns formed part of the original church and were still in place when demolition began. The cross fragments and columns are now kept in Canterbury Cathedral, and are among features that have led to the church being described as an exemplar of Anglo-Saxon church architecture and sculpture.

== Origins ==
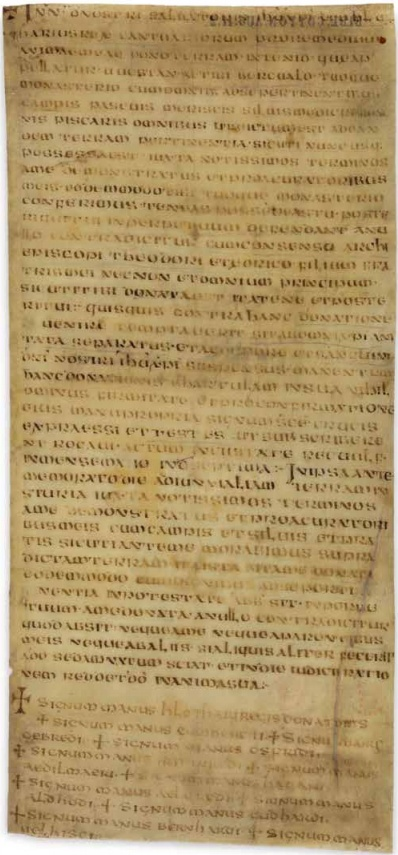
King Hlothhere of Kent grants land to Abbot Berhtwald and his monastery at Reculver in 679, in the earliest surviving original Anglo-Saxon charter.

The first church known to have existed at Reculver was founded in 669, when King Ecgberht of Kent gave land there to Bassa the priest for this purpose. (Note: The "A" manuscript of the Anglo-Saxon Chronicle, also known as the "Parker Chronicle", records that Bassa was a "mass-priest". According to Susan Kelly, "[h]e would have been a senior clergyman: a 'mass-priest' was ... a cleric who had attained the highest of the seven appointed orders and was thus qualified to celebrate the mass." Hussey 1852, p. 135, regards Bassa the priest as identical with the Northumbrian warrior Bassus who, according to Bede, had accompanied Paulinus of York and Æthelburh of Kent to Kent after the death of her husband King Edwin of Northumbria: this occurred in 633, 36 years before the foundation of the church at Reculver. Susan Kelly also references Bede in this connection, but only to indicate that Bassa's name was then current in England: she similarly refers to English place-names containing the same personal name.) The author of the Anglo-Saxon Chronicle "clearly considered this to be a significant event", and it may be that King Ecgberht's intention in founding a church at Reculver was to create an ecclesiastical centre with a strong English element, to counterbalance domination of the Canterbury Church by Archbishop Theodore, from Tarsus, now in Turkey, Abbot Hadrian of St Augustine's, from North Africa, probably Cyrenaica, and their equally "non-native followers." (Note: According to Hasted 1800, King Ecgberht gave Reculver for the establishment of a monastery "as an atonement for the murder of his two nephews [sons of Eormenred of Kent]", but Kelly 2008 does not refer to this, instead placing the church's establishment in the context of domination of the early Kentish Church by "non-native" leaders and observing that "[perhaps] it is no coincidence that in the year of Theodore's arrival [from Rome] King Ecgberht was involved in the establishment of a house of male religious [at Reculver] in a strategic location outside Canterbury. ... It may be significant that the next archbishop after the death of Theodore in 690 was Berhtwald, abbot of Reculver by 679 and perhaps Bassa's immediate successor." John Blair suggests that Reculver's foundation may have been prompted by Wilfrid.) Historians vary over whether to call the church a minster or a monastery – thus Susan Kelly uses the former term, but Nicholas Brooks uses the latter, commenting that:

[w]e do not know whether the Kentish monasteries had been founded as communities of monks and nuns dedicated to the service of God [and living in monasteries and nunneries], or whether the male communities were from the start bodies of secular clergy [operating from minsters] who, like the archiepiscopal familia at Canterbury, accepted a degree of communal (or monastic) discipline and who were responsible for the pastoral care of extensive rural areas. ... [T]he distinction between the regular and secular clergy was blurred from the very beginning in England. Indeed the word monasterium does not necessarily refer to a house of monks in the eighth and ninth centuries, but like its English equivalent, minster ..., was also the normal term for a church served by a body of clergy. ... By the ninth century the communities of the Kentish monasteries were certainly composed of priests, deacons, and clergy in lesser orders, just like the cathedral community at the 'head minster', [Canterbury Cathedral].

— Nicholas Brooks, The Early History of the Church of Canterbury, 1984

The foundation of this church, sited within the remains of the Roman fort of Regulbium, exemplifies the "widespread practice [in Anglo-Saxon England] of re-using Roman walled places for major churches"; the new church was built "almost completely from demolished Roman structures". The building formed a nave measuring 37.5 feet (11.4 m) by 24 feet (7.3 m) and an apsidal chancel, which was externally polygonal but internally round, and was separated from the nave by a triple arch formed by two columns made of limestone from Marquise, in the Pas-de-Calais region of northern France. The arches were formed using Roman tiles, but the columns were made for the church rather than being Roman in origin, and their form has been attributed to late-Roman and early Byzantine architectural influences, probably transmitted via the contemporary architecture of Merovingian France. (Note: An English Heritage information plaque for visitors to the site of the church, headed "An Anglo-Saxon Church", shows a reconstruction of the original church of Reculver, with monks robed in black in the chancel; a similar image is at Wilmott 2012, p. 24. Triple arches also featured in the near-contemporary churches of St Augustine's, Canterbury, St Peter-on-the-Wall, Bradwell-on-Sea, Essex, and at Lyminge, Kent.) Around the inside of the apse was a stone bench, and two small rooms, or porticus, forming rudimentary transepts were built out from the north and south sides of the church where the nave met the chancel, from which they could be accessed. (Note: The inclusion of porticus at Reculver in the 7th century was described in 1965 as being "without parallel in western Europe," except among contemporary churches in Kent and at the church of St Peter-on-the-Wall, Bradwell-on-Sea, Essex, but more recent analysis has shown that porticus were probably more common in early Anglo-Saxon churches.) The presence of a stone bench around the inside of the apse has been attributed to influence from the Syrian Church, at a time when its followers were being displaced. The walls of the church were rendered inside and out, giving them a plain appearance and hiding the masonry.

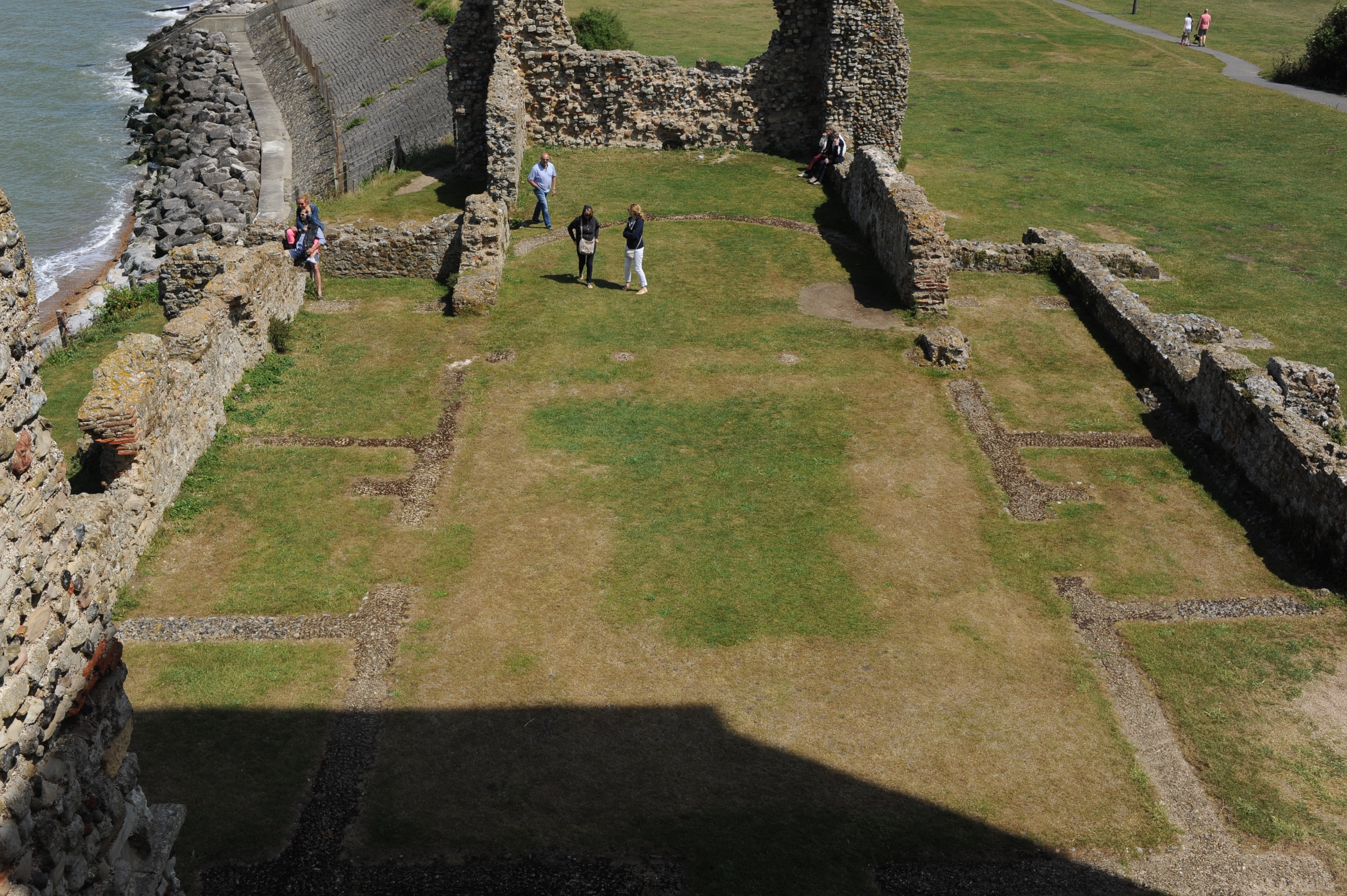
Interior of the ruined church, looking eastwards from an elevated gallery between the towers in 2015. A curved strip of concrete towards the top of the image marks the line of the apse, and two circles of concrete represent foundations for the columns of the triple chancel arch. To the right of these is the southern porticus, where King Eadberht II of Kent was buried in the 760s. Parched grass in the central, nave area indicates the underlying presence of original, concrete flooring.

Ten years after the foundation of the church, in 679, King Hlothhere of Kent granted lands at Sturry, about 6.2 miles (10 km) south-west of Reculver, and at Sarre, in the western part of the Isle of Thanet, across the Wantsum Channel to the east, to Abbot Berhtwald and his "monastery". (Note: The charter, S 8, uses the dative form of the Latin word "monasterium", and is the earliest genuine Anglo-Saxon charter known to have survived in its original form.) The grant was made at Reculver, and the charter in which it was recorded was probably written by a Reculver scribe. The grant of Sarre in particular is significant:

Sarre was a highly strategic place, overlooking the confluence of the Wantsum and the Great Stour, [and] directly linked to Canterbury ... In the early 760s it was the site of a toll-station, where the agents of the Kentish kings collected dues on trading ships using the Wantsum route ... The grant of Sarre to Reculver must be regarded as a sign of enormous royal favour to the [church there] ... and it may be that the [church at Reculver] received a share of the royal tolls levied at Sarre.

— Susan Kelly, "Reculver Minster and its early charters", 2008

In the original, 7th-century charter recording this grant, Reculver is referred to as a civitas, or city, but this is probably a reference to either its Roman past or the church's monastic status, rather than a large population centre. In 692 Reculver's abbot Berhtwald was elected Archbishop of Canterbury, from which position he probably offered Reculver patronage and support. Bede, writing no more than 40 years later, described Berhtwald as having been well educated in the Bible and experienced in ecclesiastical and monastic affairs, but in terms indicating that Berhtwald was not a scholar. (Note: Berhtwald is regarded as a saint, "apparently based on a single late calendar of St Augustine's Abbey, Canterbury".)

Further charters show that the monastery at Reculver continued to benefit from Kentish kings in the 8th century, under abbots Heahberht (fl. 748x762), Deneheah (fl. 760) and Hwitred (fl. 784), acquiring lands in Higham and Sheldwich and exemption from the toll due on one ship at Fordwich near Canterbury, and King Eadberht II of Kent was buried in the church in the 760s. (Note: In her 2004 entry for Æthelberht II in the Oxford Dictionary of National Biography, Susan Kelly wrote that Eadberht I of Kent was buried at Reculver "in 748". However, in Kelly 2008, she observes that there is "a much better context" for this royal burial to have been of Eadberht II, who "faded from view c. 763 x 764". The royal tomb at Reculver was "in a position corresponding to the south porticus (at St Augustine's kings were buried in the south porticus); an inscription or other record identifying [the occupant] as King Eadberht (grand-)son of King Æthelberht may have given rise to the later belief that it was the earlier King Æthelberht himself that was buried [at Reculver]." Ward 1946, p. 27, believes that, instead of Sheldwich, a grant was made of land at Shelvingford near Hoath, but this is not supported by e.g. Glover 1976, pp. 170–1.) Properties belonging to Reculver in the 7th and 8th centuries are indicated in passing by otherwise unrelated records, such as the estate at Higham, land probably in the High Weald area of Kent, from which iron may have been sourced for use or sale at or on behalf of Reculver, and an unidentified property named Dunwaling land in the district of Eastry. (Note: According to Ward 1946, p. 26, Abbot Berhtwald of Reculver was recorded as owning land at Lyminge: in the relevant record, land belonging to the "venerable presbyter abbot" is said to be adjacent to a curtilage that includes an iron mine and is being granted to St Augustine's Abbey – Ward dates the record to 674, but this is in error for 689.) Such records also identify other abbots of Reculver, namely Æthelmær (fl. 699), Bære (fl. 761x764), Æthelheah (fl. 803), Dudeman (fl. 805), Beornwine (fl. 811x826), Baegmund (fl. 832x839), Daegmund (fl. 825x883) and Beornhelm (fl. 867x905).

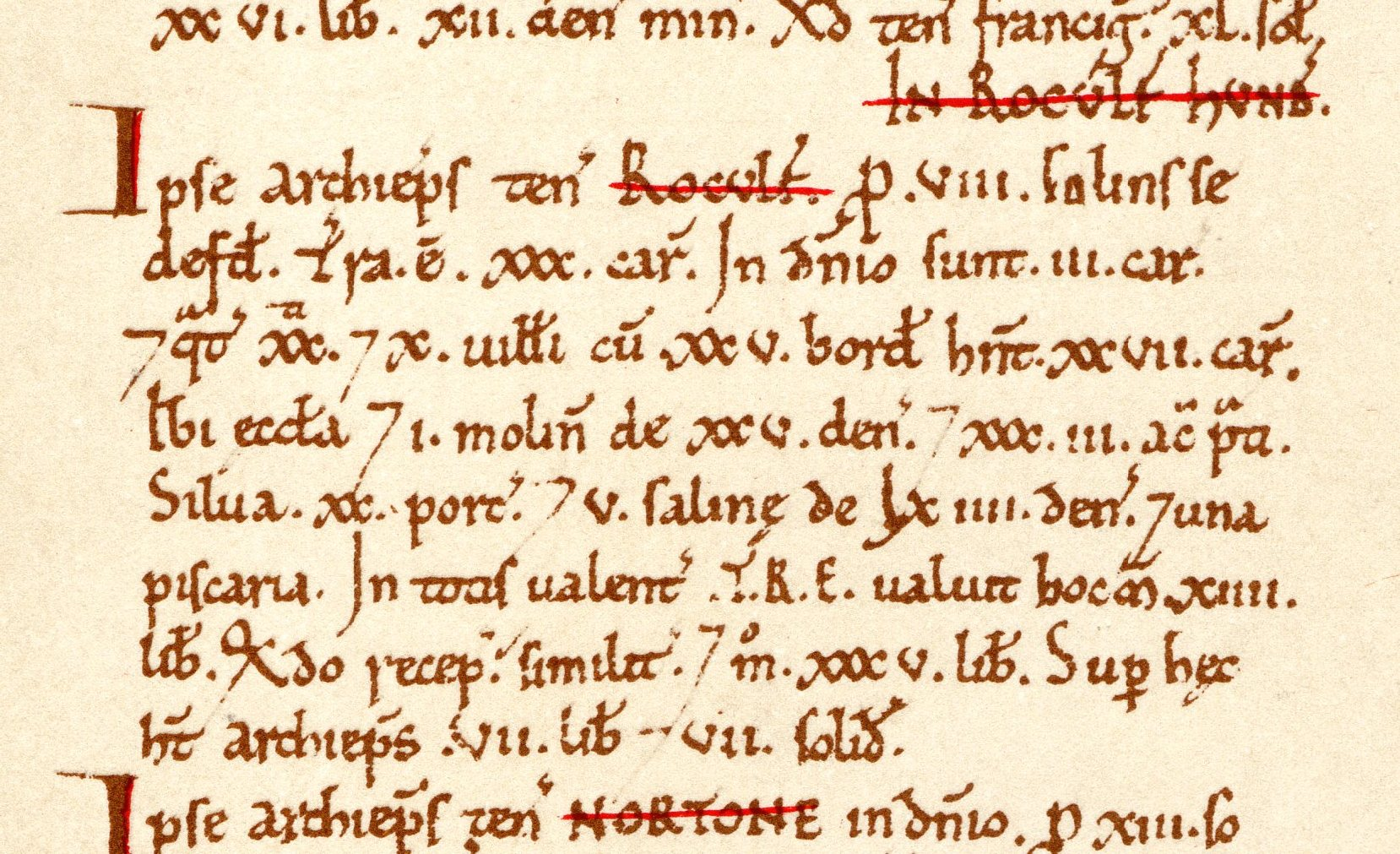
Triple arch of the 7th-century church, between the nave and the chancel until demolition in the early 19th century: the arch was 22 feet (6.7 m) high, and the columns 17 feet (5.2 m).

By the early 9th century the monastery had become "extremely wealthy", but from then on it appears in records as "essentially a piece of property". For most of the period from 764 to 825 Kent was under the control of kings of Mercia, beginning with Offa (757–96), who treated Kent as part of his patrimony: he may also have claimed direct control of Reculver, as he did with similar churches in other areas. In 811 control of the monastery appears to have been in the hands of Archbishop Wulfred of Canterbury, who is recorded as having deprived it of some of its land. But by 817 Reculver was in the hands of King Coenwulf of Mercia (796–821), together with the nunnery at Minster-in-Thanet, through which he would also have had strategically lucrative control of the Wantsum Channel: Coenwulf had by then secured a privilege from Pope Leo III that gave him the right to "dispose of his ... monasteries in [England] at will". In that year a "monumental showdown" began between Archbishop Wulfred and King Coenwulf over the control of monasteries, featuring Reculver and Minster-in-Thanet in particular. The dispute over Reculver continued until 821, when Wulfred "made a humiliating submission to [Coenwulf]", surrendering to him an estate of 300 hides, possibly at Eynsham in Oxfordshire, and paying a fine of £120, to secure the return of Reculver and Minster-in-Thanet. (Note: According to Nicholas Brooks, 300 hides was "almost as much as the entire archiepiscopal holding in Kent at the time of the Domesday survey [in 1086.] ... [T]he huge sum of £120 ... [was] in Mercian law ... the amount that had to be paid as the blood-price or wergild of a king.") The record of the dispute indicates that Wulfred continued to be denied control of Reculver and Minster-in-Thanet after 821 by Cwoenthryth, Coenwulf's heir and abbess of Minster-in-Thanet, until a final settlement was reached at a synod at Clofesho in 825. (Note: By 826 Cwoenthryth "would seem either to have died, or more probably to have resigned as abbess of [Minster-in-Thanet].")

From 825 control of Kent fell to the kings of Wessex, and a compromise was reached between Archbishop Ceolnoth and King Egbert in 838, confirmed by his son Æthelwulf in 839, recognising Egbert and Æthelwulf as lay lords and protectors of monasteries and reserving spiritual lordship, particularly over election of abbots and abbesses, to bishops. One copy of the record of this agreement was preserved either at Reculver or at Lyminge. A factor leading to this abandonment of Wulfred's strict policy may have been the increasing intensity of Viking attacks, which had begun in Kent in the late 8th century and had seen the ravaging of the Isle of Sheppey in 835. An army of Vikings spent the winter of 851 on the Isle of Thanet and the same occurred on the Isle of Sheppey in 855. Reculver, like most of the Kentish monasteries, lay in an exposed coastal location, and would have presented an obvious target for Vikings in search of treasure. By the 10th century the monastery at Reculver had ceased to be an important church in Kent and, together with its territory, it was in the hands of the kings of Wessex alone. In a charter of 949 King Eadred of England gave Reculver back to the archbishops of Canterbury, at which time the estate included Hoath and Herne, land at Sarre, in Thanet, and land at Chilmington, about 23.5 miles (37.8 km) south-west of Reculver. (Note: It may be that the estate was previously in the possession of Eadgifu, King Eadred's mother, and that it was bought from her by Archbishop Oda. The land at Chilmington is specified in the charter as "for the repair of the church", and was "probably a recent gift" to it.)

== Monastery to parish church ==
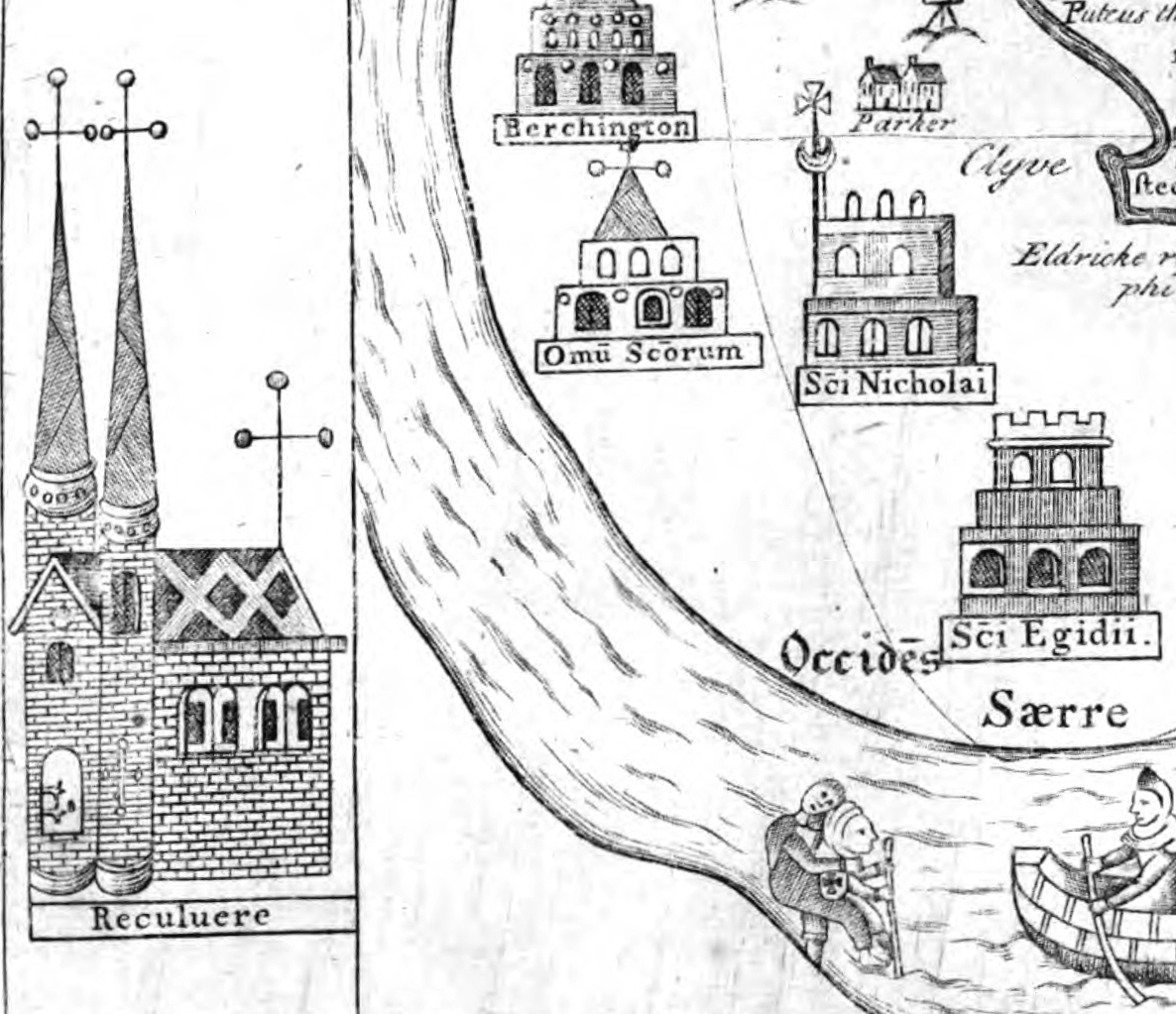
Detail from an adaptation of a 15th-century map of the Isle of Thanet by Thomas Elmham, with north on the left: a stylised view of St Mary's Church, Reculver, is inset at left, and the chapelries of St Nicholas-at-Wade and All Saints' Church, Shuart, marked as "Om[ni]u[m] S[an]c[t]orum", are shown on Thanet. The Wantsum Channel is shown separating the island from mainland Kent.

Reculver may have remained home to a religious community into the 10th century, despite its vulnerability to Viking attacks. It is possible that the abbot and community of Reculver took refuge from the Vikings in Canterbury, as the abbess and community of Lyminge did in 804. A monk of Reculver named Ymar was recorded as a saint in the early 15th century by Thomas Elmham, who found the name in a martyrology, and wrote that Ymar was buried in St John's Church, Margate: Ymar was probably killed by Vikings in the 10th century, and hence regarded as a martyr. The Church in East Kent seems broadly to have "preserved its primary ... character against all the odds", but evidence for the monastery at Reculver is lacking: by the 11th century the monastery had "dropped out of sight entirely". The last abbot is recorded as Wenredus: although it is unknown when he was abbot, it must have been after 890 – possibly 905 – when the name of Abbot Beornhelm last appears in Anglo-Saxon charters. The church was last described as a monastery in about 1030, when it was governed by a dean named Givehard and was home to monks, two of whom are named as Fresnot and Tancrad: these names indicate the presence of a religious community from the European continent, probably Flemings. (Note: In its listing for "Tancrad 1", the Prosopography of Anglo-Saxon England regards this Tancrad as identical with an otherwise unidentified "Þancred" (Thancred) named in an "account of the restoration of Sandwich to Christ Church, Canterbury, by King Harold" (i.e. Harold Harefoot), which occurred between 1037 and 1040.) This may have been nothing more than a temporary "resurgence of communal life at Reculver, at least for a period in the earlier eleventh century. ... [Perhaps] the old minster ... was provided as a refuge for a body of foreign clerics".

By 1066 the monastery had become a parish church, with no baptismal function. (Note: The statement that the church had no baptismal function by 1066 is at Kelly 2008, p. 82; Brooks 1984, pp. 203–4, notes that, in the 11th century, St Mary's was not among churches identified as receiving the chrism required for baptism from the archbishop.) In 1086, Reculver was listed in Domesday Book among lands belonging to the archbishop of Canterbury: in practice, however, it must previously have been lost to him again, since William the Conqueror is recorded as having returned it to the archbishop, along with other churches and properties, at his death, which occurred in 1087. (Note: The record states that the king "reddidit ecclesiae Christi omnes fere terras antiquis et modernis temporibus a iure ipsius ecclesiae ablatas ... Haec omnia reddidit ... gratis et sine ullo pretio." ("returned to Christ Church almost all the lands, its by right from ancient and modern times, that had been removed ... He returned all these things ... free and without any remuneration."). Among these, Reculver is listed first among 19 items in Kent but only by its place-name, while at Lyminge the monastery is specified.) The value of the manor of Reculver in 1066 is given as £14, but in 1086 it was worth a total of £42.7s. (£42.35): this can be compared with, for example, the £20 due to the archbishop from the manor of Maidstone, and £50 from the borough of Sandwich. (Note: Of the £42.7s. from Reculver, £7.7s. (£7.35) was from an unspecified source. While Hoath, Herne and western parts of the Isle of Thanet were Reculver possessions in the Anglo-Saxon period, and remained attached to Reculver long after 1086, of these only Reculver is named in Domesday Book: "[as] the name [Reculver] is used here, it means something larger than the parish but much smaller than the thirteenth-century manor of Reculver. It is fairly sure to have included Hoath ...; it may also have included the adjoining part of Thanet, [including Shuart] ... and St Nicholas-at-Wade ... [The archbishop's separate manor of Nortone is] Herne ... under another name." The value of the manor of Herne – if Flight 2010 is correct in identifying it with the Domesday manor of Nortone (Williams & Martin 2002, p. 8, identifies Nortone as "'Northwood' [in Whitstable]") – exceeded that of Reculver in both 1066 and 1086, at £25.5s (£25.25) and £50.14s.2d (£50.71) respectively. The "Domesday Monachorum", a collection of documents produced at Canterbury in connection with the Domesday survey, includes a list of churches, to each of which other churches are said to belong: while it makes no reference to Reculver, it states that a monastery at Herne belonged to a church at Charing, which is about 20 miles (32 km) south-west by west from Herne. Domesday Book's description of the manor of Nortone includes a church. According to Nellie Neilson, writing in 1932, the "churches attached to the minsters or chief churches [in the 'Domesday Monachorum' list] seem to be much scattered [and this] apparently represents an ecclesiastical arrangement which hitherto has not been traced".) Included in the Domesday account for Reculver, as well as the church, farmland, a mill, salt pans and a fishery, are 90 villeins and 25 bordars: these numbers can be multiplied four or five times to account for dependents, as they only represent "adult male heads of households". (Note: The multiplication indicated by Eales would give a peasant population for the whole of the estate centred on Reculver in 1086 of 460–575 people. The mill was probably a watermill, near Brook Farm, and King Eadred's charter of 949 refers to a mill-creek in the area. There are numerous medieval salt working sites in the area to the south and east of Reculver, many of which lie on land belonging to Reculver in the medieval period, for example at TR23316797.)

By the 13th century Reculver parish provided an ecclesiastical benefice of "exceptional wealth", which led to disputes between lay and Church interests. (Note: "From 1295 until 1308 there were rival rectors, and violent seizures of tithes for four summers.") In 1291 the Taxatio of Pope Nicholas IV put the total income due to the rector and vicar of Reculver at about £130. (Note: From 1310, the rector of Reculver was the archbishop of Canterbury.) Included in the parish were chapels of ease at St Nicholas-at-Wade and All Saints' Church, Shuart, both on the Isle of Thanet, and at Hoath and Herne. The parish was broken up in 1310 by Robert Winchelsey, archbishop of Canterbury from 1294 to 1313, who created parishes from Reculver's chapelries at Herne and, on the Isle of Thanet, St Nicholas-at-Wade and Shuart, in response to the difficulties posed by the distance between them and their mother church at Reculver, and a "steady increase in population", which Winchelsey estimated at more than 3,000. (Note: "The only burial ground for the whole parish was at Reculver, and the problem of finding a priest to minister to a dying parishioner and then to convey the body anything up to six miles for burial in a bleak, north Kent winter must have been as distressing as it was formidable." In 1274–75, the jurors of Bleangate hundred, in which Reculver then lay, reported that it had lately been made more difficult for the people of Thanet to reach the mainland: while previously access had been provided by a "wall", this had been cut off by a ditch dug for the abbot of St Augustine's, Canterbury.) At this time Shuart became part of St Nicholas-at-Wade parish, and its church was later demolished. However, St Mary's Church, Reculver, continued to receive payments from the parishes of Herne and St Nicholas-at-Wade in the 19th century as a "token of subjection to Reculver", as well as for the repair of St Mary's Church, and the parish retained a perpetual curacy at Hoath until 1960. (Note: In 1918 it was reported that a seal matrix had been discovered in the previous year "just to the south-east of the ruined church." The seal matrix dates to the early 14th century, and bears the inscription "S[igillum] Vicarii de Reiculvre", or "Seal of the Vicar of Reculver". It was probably created in connection with the grant of the peculiar status of Rural Dean to Nicholas Tingewick, physician to King Edward I and rector of Reculver until 1310, when he became Reculver's first recorded vicar.)

== Enlargement and decline ==
=== Enlargement ===
The church building was considerably enlarged over time. The outer walls of the north and south porticus were extended westwards to enclose the nave in the 8th century, forming a series of rooms, including chapels on both northern and southern sides, and a porch across the western side. The towers were added as part of an extension with a new west front in the late 12th century, when the internal walls of the rooms added in the 8th century were demolished, creating aisles on the north and south sides of the nave. In the 13th century the original apse was demolished and the chancel more than doubled in size, incorporating a triple east window of lancets with columns of Purbeck Marble, and in the 15th century north and south porches were added to the nave. (Note: Ground plans showing the development of the church from the 7th century to the 15th are at Wilmott 2012, pp. 24–5.) At some point in the same period, according to J. Russell Larkby, a sundial was added to the south wall of the south tower, about 3.5 feet (1.1 m) from the ground. A chantry in the church was endowed in 1354 in memory of Alicia de Brouke, and two more were endowed in 1371 by Thomas Niewe, a former vicar of Reculver. These chantries were suppressed in the reign of Edward VI, in 1548 or very early in 1549. (Note: The chantry priests are listed at Duncombe 1784, p. 158: the last chantry priest, Thomas Hewet, was drawing a pension of £6 in 1556.) The towers were topped with spires by 1414, since they are shown in an illustrated map drawn by Thomas Elmham in or before that year, and the north tower held a ring of bells, accessed by a spiral staircase. (Note: According to legend the towers were topped with spires early in the 16th century, and the legend gave rise to a by-name of the "Twin Sisters", in reference to a prioress of Davington and her sister. George Dowker wrote in 1878 that "[i]t is probable that there is some basis [for the legend], as the architectural features of the towers [of St Mary's Church, Reculver,] would agree well with [the date of Davington Priory's foundation in 1156]." The west front of Davington Priory originally had two towers, and in 1966 Robert H. Goodsall drew attention to the similarity between these and the towers at Reculver. A bell from the church was reported sold in 1606, and in 1683 it was reported that the ring of bells was in need of repair. Four bells were reported present by Francis Green, vicar of Reculver from 1695 to 1716, and by Bryan Faussett in 1758: Faussett added that they had been made in 1635 by Joseph Hatch. He also cast the bell known as "Bell Harry" at Canterbury Cathedral. The spiral staircase is a regular feature in plans of the church, for example that at Peers 1927, Fig. 4.) The addition of the towers, "an extraordinary investment ... for a parish church", and the extent to which the church was enlarged in the Middle Ages, suggest that "a thriving township must have developed nearby." Despite all the building work, the church retained many prominent Anglo-Saxon features, and one in particular roused John Leland to "an enthusiasm which he seldom displayed" when he visited Reculver in 1540:

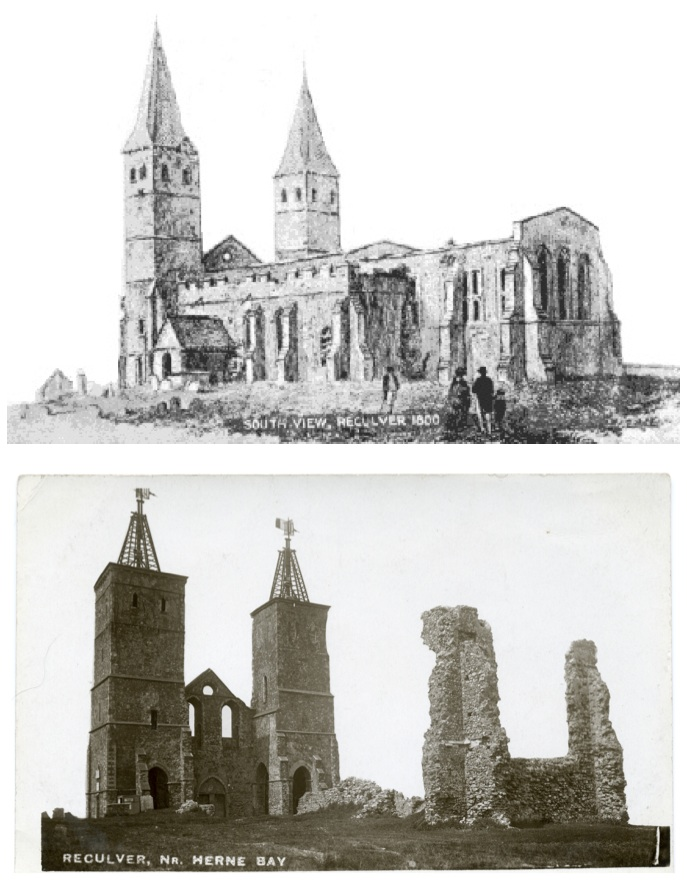
Two views of the Church: (top) in 1800 and (bottom) in 1900.

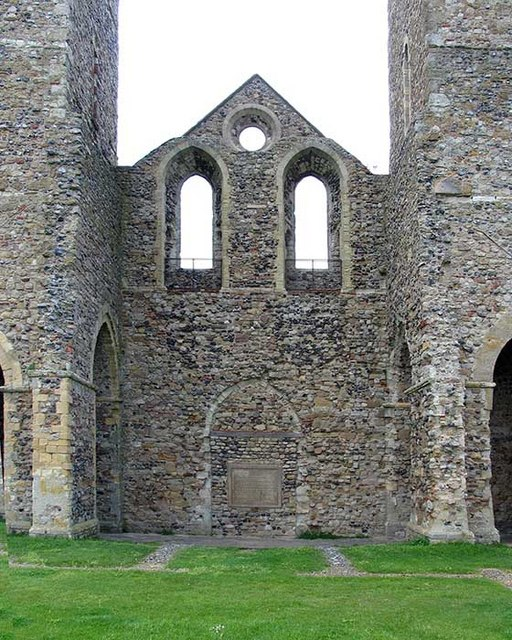
Interior of the west end of the ruins of St Mary's Church, Reculver, in 2008: the gallery between the towers passes through the openings for the two main windows.

Yn the enteryng of the quyer ys one of the fayrest and the most auncyent crosse that ever I saw, a ix footes, as I ges, yn highte. It standeth lyke a fayr columne. The base greate stone ys not wrought. The second stone being rownd hath curiously wrought and paynted the images of Christ, Peter, Paule, John and James, as I remember. Christ sayeth [I am the Alpha and the Omega]. Peter sayeth, [You are Christ, son of the living God]. The saing of the other iij when painted [was in Roman capitals] but now obliterated. The second stone is of the Passion. The third conteineth the xii Apostles. The iiii hath the image of Christ hanging and fastened with iiii nayles and [a support beneath the feet]. the hiest part of the pyller hath the figure of a crosse.

— John Leland, "Itinerary", 1540

The high cross described by Leland had been removed from the church by 1784. (Note: The cross probably stood until the English Reformation, when it was "presumably destroyed by sixteenth-century iconoclasts [after which] nothing more is recorded of it.") Archaeologists examined what was believed to be the base of a 7th-century cross in 1878 and the 1920s, and it has been suggested that the monastery at Reculver was originally built around it. The Reculver cross has been compared with the Anglo-Saxon Ruthwell Cross – an open-air preaching cross in Dumfries and Galloway, Scotland – and traces of paint on fragments of the Reculver cross show that its details were once multicoloured. Later, stylistic assessments indicate that the cross, carved from a re-used Roman column, probably dates from the 8th century or the 9th, and that the stone believed to have been the base may have been the foundation for the original, 7th-century altar. (Note: According to E.M. Jope, "[s]ome later 7th- or early 8th-century work ... contains a few blocks of freestone less likely to have been found among Roman ruins ... [Fine] stone from northern France was used for the cross-head". B.C. Worssam and T.W.T. Tatton-Brown conclude that all the surviving parts of the cross are of French "Calcaire Grossier", similar to the mid-Lutetian Limestone used for an Anglo-Saxon cross-head at Pagham, West Sussex, that was probably sourced from a Roman structure at nearby Chichester or Fishbourne. Susan Kelly regards it as "probable that it was against [the] complicated background [of Mercian control of Kentish monasteries early in the 9th century] that the Reculver cross was carved from an old Roman column and erected behind the altar before the chancel arch. A date in the early ninth century is certainly implied by ... Carolingian parallels and the stylistic evidence ... There was a strong Mercian tradition of stone sculpture in the eighth century (in Wessex this craft did not develop until the ninth), so it is tempting to suspect that the cross was set up while Reculver was under the control of the Mercian kings. The minster at Winchcombe in Gloucestershire [was] closely associated with King Coenwulf and his family ... The erection of a massive cross [at Reculver] perhaps reflected Winchcombe influence." The classicist Martin Henig notes that a Christian church and a baptismal font dating from Roman times have been identified at nearby Richborough (Rutupiae), and considers it possible that there may have been Christian churches replacing pagan aedes in other Saxon Shore forts, such as that at Reculver, where an aedes is known to have existed; he also suggests that the Reculver cross could have been a replacement for an earlier, "Christianised Roman monument", for example a re-used Jupiter column, as may have happened at Canterbury Cathedral and in Trigg, in Cornwall. In 1938 T.D. Kendrick observed that "[b]y hypothesis [the cross] should be an obvious reflection of a continental or eastern style; but the source cannot be found, and so far from showing itself to be immediately connected with any known Italian, Gaulish, or Syrian sculpture of the Late Antique schools, the Reculver figural style differs markedly from anything abroad. Moreover, its iconography is as startling as its figure-style, and as difficult to explain. The truth is that [this] Kentish sculpture stands alone, and its peculiarity and precociousness can only be accounted for on the grounds that it is already English and representative of a vigorously experimental insular art. It remains the most baffling and incomprehensible carving in the country". A reconstruction of the Reculver cross is at Kozodoy 1986, p. 86, Figs. 3 & 4, and this is reproduced at Canterbury City Council 2008, p. 5. A reconstruction showing only the front of the cross is at Wilmott 2012, p. 44.) Leland also reported a wall painting of an unidentified bishop, on the north side of the church under an arch. Another Anglo-Saxon item Leland found in the church was a gospel book: this was

'a very auncient boke of the Evangelyes [in Roman capital letters] and in the bordes thereof ys a christal stone thus inscribid: CLAUDIA . ATEPICCUS'. A gospel book written in 'Roman majuscules' is unlikely to have been later than the early ninth century: perhaps it was an Italian import, such as the celebrated sixth-century manuscript known as the 'Gospels of St Augustine' (CCCC 286), but it could also have been a native product, of the seventh to ninth century, written in uncial or half-uncial, such as the 'Royal Gospels' from St Augustine's (BL Royal I E VI). It appears to have had a lavish binding decorated with a Roman cameo.

— Susan Kelly, "Reculver Minster and its early charters", 2008 (Note: In 1903 Francis Grayling asserted that a similar book was on a desk under the north-west tower "in the time of James I" (1603–1625): this detail is otherwise unsupported.)

In its final form, the church consisted of a nave 67 feet (20.4 m) long by 24 feet (7.3 m) wide, with north and south aisles of the same length and 11 feet (3.4 m) wide, and a chancel 46 feet (14 m) long by 23 feet (7 m) wide. Including the spires, the towers were 106 feet (32.3 m) high, the surviving towers alone reaching 63 feet (19.2 m). The towers measure 12 feet (3.7 m) square internally, and are connected internally by a gallery that was about 25 feet (7.6 m) above the floor of the nave. The overall length of the church was 120 feet (36.6 m), and the breadth of the west front, which also survives, is 64 feet (19.5 m).

=== Decline ===
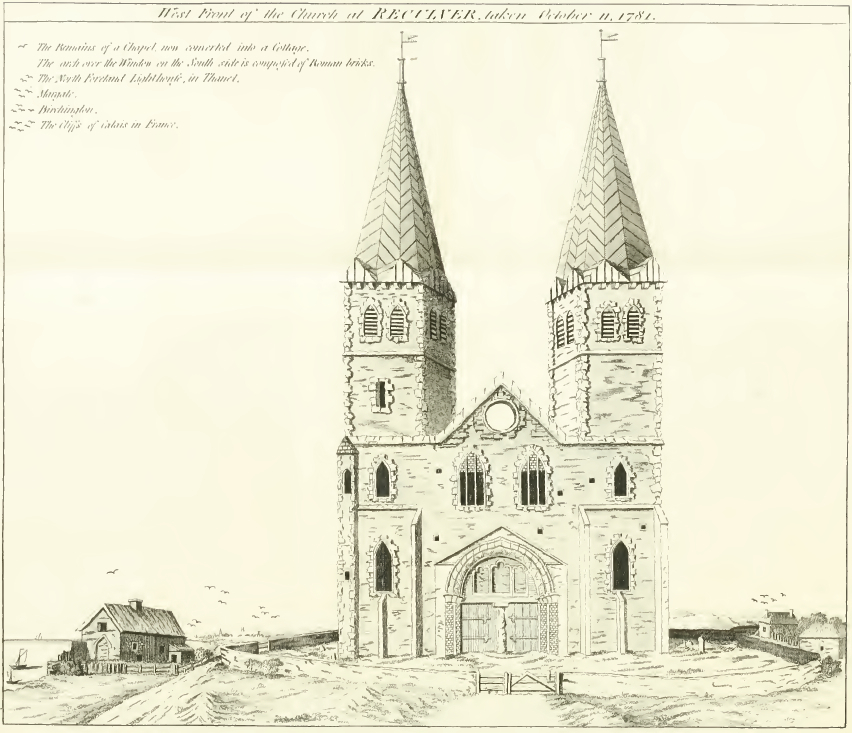
The decaying west front of St Mary's Church in 1781: the two windows above the double west door are partly bricked up, perhaps in connection with a lowering of the roof. The building at left is the former chapel of St James. The straight section of churchyard wall at right still stands.

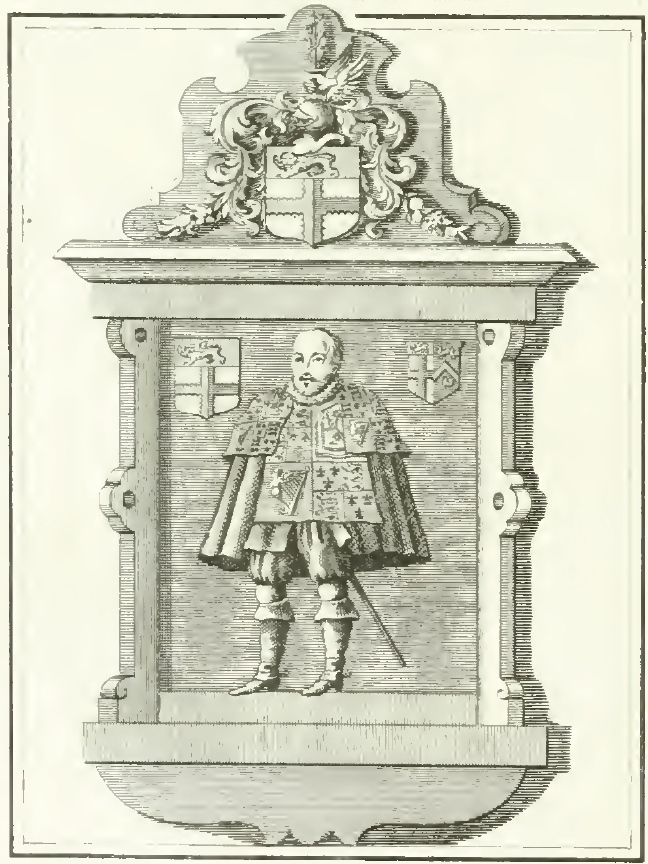
1784 engraving of mural monument to Ralph Brooke in the chancel of St Mary's Church, Reculver; destroyed when the church was rebuilt

When Leland visited Reculver in 1540, he noted that the coastline to the north had receded to within little more than a quarter of a mile (402 m) of the "Towne [which] at this tyme [was] but Village lyke". Soon after, in 1576, William Lambarde described Reculver as "poore and simple". In 1588 there were 165 communicants – people in Reculver parish taking part in services of holy communion at the church – and in 1640 there were 169, but a map of about 1630 shows that the church then stood only about 500 feet (152 m) from the shore. (Note: Part of this map is illustrated in Dowker 1878, facing page 8.) In January 1658 the local justices of the peace were petitioned concerning "encroachments of the sea ... [that had] since Michaelmas last [29 September 1657] encroached on the land near six rods [99 feet (30 m)], and will doubtless do more harm". The village's failure to support two "beer shops" in the 1660s points clearly to a declining population, and the village was mostly abandoned around the end of the 18th century, its residents moving to Hillborough, about 1.25 miles (2 km) south-west of Reculver but within Reculver parish.

The decline of the settlement led to the decline of the church. In 1776 Thomas Philipot described it as "full of solitude, and languished into decay". In 1787 John Pridden noticed that the roofline of the nave must have been lowered at some time, judging by the tops of the east and west walls, and the fact that the tops of the two windows over the west door were at that time filled in with brick; he also noted that the roof had been repaired in 1775 by A. Sayer, churchwarden, these details appearing embossed on replacement lead. But he described the church as "a weather-beaten building ... mouldering away by the fury of the elements", and a letter to The Gentleman's Magazine in 1809 said that it was then somewhat dilapidated, with "trifling ... repairs such as have only tended to obliterate its once-harmonizing beauties."

== Destruction ==
In the autumn of 1807 a northerly storm combined with a high tide to bring erosion of the cliff on which the church stood to within the churchyard, destroying "ten yards [9.1 m] of the wall around the churchyard, not ten yards from the foundation of the church". Sea defences had been in place since at least 1783, but although they had been costly to build their design had led to further undermining of the cliff. Two further schemes were devised by Sir Thomas Page and John Rennie to preserve the cliff by means of new sea defences, Rennie's being estimated to cost £8,277. Instead, at a vestry meeting on 12 January 1808, and at the instigation of the vicar, Christopher Naylor, it was decided that the church should be demolished. (Note: Taylor 1968, p. 291, gives the year in which the decision was made to demolish the church as 1802, Fletcher 1965, p. 24, and Kelly 2008, p. 67, give it as 1805, and Wilmott 2012, p. 45, gives it as 1807, but, while the chronology set out in Gough 2014 indicates a date in late 1807 or early 1808, the relevant article in The Literary Panorama is in a section headed "For March, 1808", is dated "January 17", and states that the vestry meeting was held "on Tuesday last".) The decision was reached by vote among eight of the leading residents of Reculver and Hoath, including the vicar: the votes were evenly split, so the vicar used his casting vote in favour of demolition. (Note: A record of events written by John Brett, parish clerk, states that, from 1802, "peopel [sic] come from all parts to see the ruines of village and the church Mr C B Nailor been vicar of the parish his mother fanced that the church wos keep for a poppet show and she persuade har son to take it down": Brett, who had been parish clerk for 40 years, voted against demolition, and wrote of the vicar, "whot wos [his thoughts] about [his] flock that day no one knows".) Naylor applied to the Archbishop of Canterbury, Charles Manners-Sutton, for permission to demolish, arguing that "in all human probability the parishioners [would] shortly be deprived of a place for the interment of their dead." The archbishop commissioned neighbouring clergy and landowners to assess the situation, and they reported in March 1809 that the church should be demolished "to save the materials for the erection of another church." (Note: The commissioners were the rector of Staplehurst, Robert Parry, the vicar of Willesborough, John Francis, and George May, John Ashbee and John Collard, all of Herne.)

Demolition was begun in September 1809 using gunpowder, in what has been described as "an act of vandalism for which there can be few parallels even in the blackest records of the nineteenth century": (Note: Sources frequently date the church's demolition to 1805, but a meeting to discuss the church's future was held at the church on 12 January 1808; a detailed description of the standing church, including pleas for its preservation, was submitted to The Gentleman's Magazine on 3 March 1809; The Gentleman's Magazine reported in 1809 and 1856 that the church's demolition began in September 1809; and the year of the church's demolition is given as 1809 in Blair 1999 and in the archive of Canterbury Cathedral.)

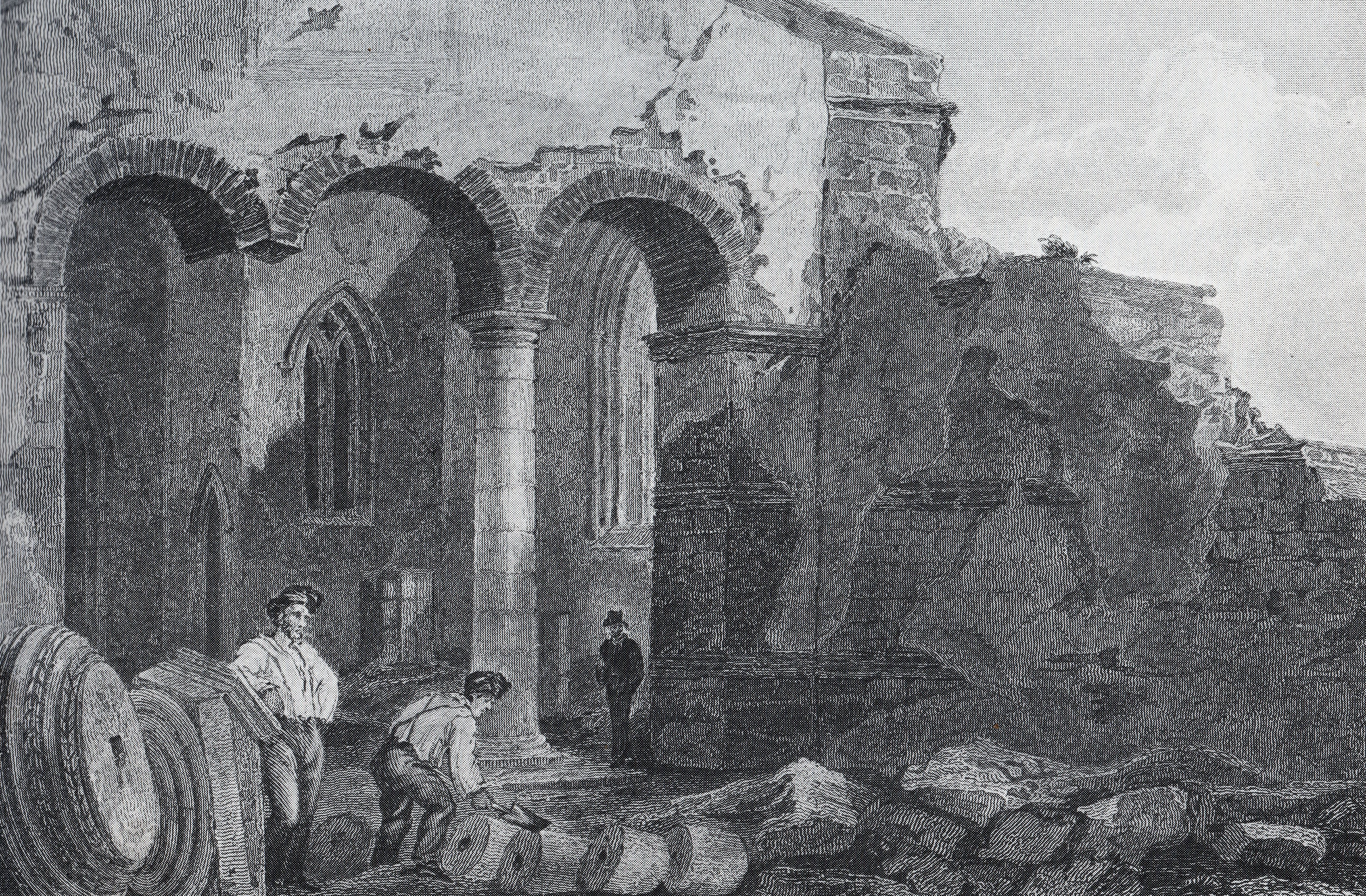
Demolition of the church in progress: viewed from the south-east, the main feature is the 7th-century triple chancel arch, with one of its two columns already taken down.

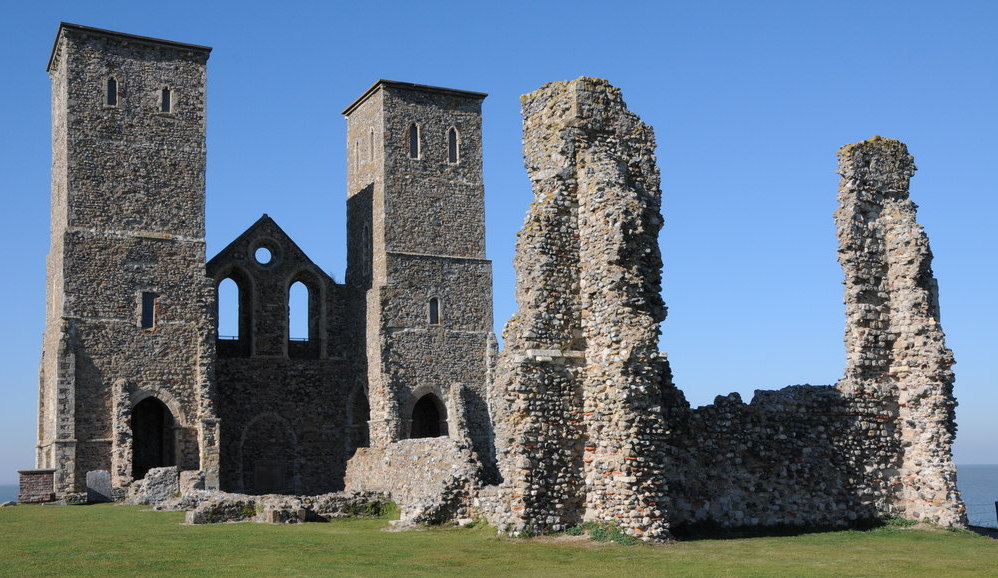
Ruins of St Mary's Church, Reculver, seen from the south-east in 2011

the young clergyman of the parish, urged on by his Philistine mother, rashly besought his parishioners to demolish this shrine of early Christendom. This they duly did and all save the western towers, which still act as a landmark for shipping, was razed to the ground.

— Nigel & Mary Kerr, A Guide to Anglo-Saxon Sites, 1982

The demolition of this "shrine of early Christendom", and exemplar of Anglo-Saxon church architecture and sculpture, was otherwise thorough, and it is now represented only by the ruins on the site, material incorporated into a replacement parish church at Hillborough, fragments of the cross, and the two stone columns that had been part of the church's triple arch. The columns and fragments of the cross are on display in Canterbury Cathedral. (Note: An aerial view of the ruins is at Witney 1982, Plate 8.) Two thousand tons of stone from the demolished church were sold and incorporated into the harbour wall at Margate, known as Margate Pier, which was completed in 1815, and more than 40 tons of lead was stripped from the church and sold for £900. (Note: Lead from the spires and roof of the church was offered for sale in the Kentish Gazette on 14 July 1809. Gough 1995, p. 10, says that "lead from the roof and spires was sold to Joseph Day of London for £860.8s.0d. [£860.40] at a rate of £25.10s.0d. [£25.50] per ton." Tenders were invited for the transport of large quantities of stone from Reculver to Margate on 2 June 1810. In 1887, J.C.L. Stahlschmidt wrote that one of the bells made by Joseph Hatch in 1635 was re-used in the new church at Hillborough and another in St Leonard's Church, Badlesmere, Kent: "the others, probably, ... [were] melted.") In 1810 Trinity House bought what was left of the structure from the parish for £100, to ensure that the towers were preserved as a navigational aid, and built the first groynes, designed to protect the cliff on which the ruins stand. (Note: Trinity House also repaired the towers' buttresses, and filled in the church's west door, with brick.) The spires had both been destroyed by storms by 1819, when Trinity House replaced them with similarly shaped, open structures, topped by wind vanes. (Note: A stone tablet incorporated into the church ruins reads: "These Towers the Remains of the once venerable Church of Reculvers, were purchased of the Parish by the Corporation of Trinity House, of Deptford Strond in the Year 1810, and Groins laid down at their Expence, to protect the Cliff on which the Church had stood. When the ancient Spires were afterwards blown down, the present Substitutes were erected, to render the Towers still sufficiently conspicuous to be useful to Navigation. Captn. Joseph Cotton, deputy Master in the year 1819." An anonymous engraving from 1812, entitled "N.E. View of Reculver Church, Kent, 1812", shows the church in ruins and only one of the spires remaining.) These structures remained until they were removed some time after 1928. The ruins of the church, and the site of the Roman fort within which it was built, are now in the care of English Heritage, and the sea defences around Reculver are maintained by the Environment Agency.

== Archaeology ==
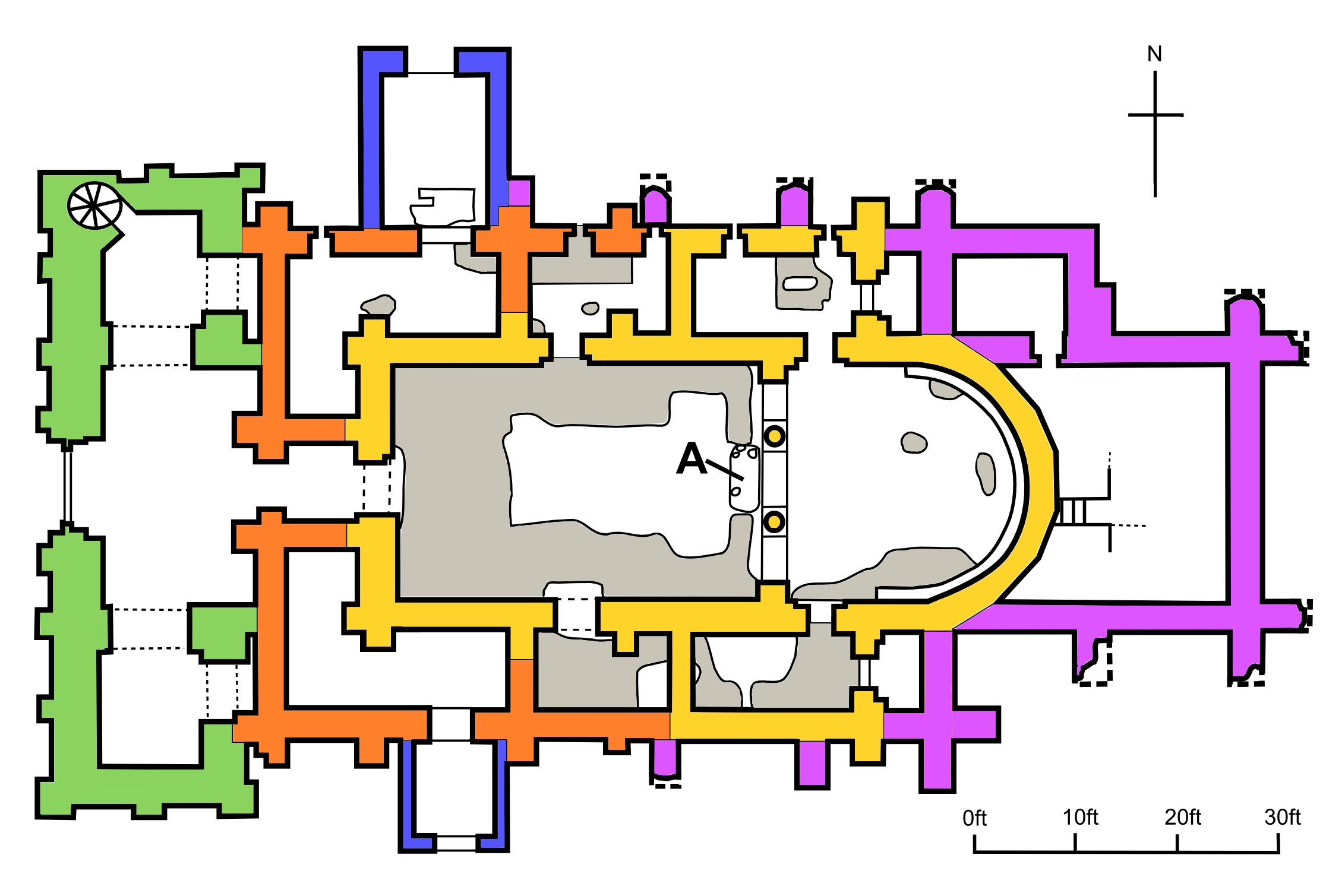
Ground plan of the church, based on that of C. R. Peers: the outline of the original, 7th-century structure is in yellow, 8th-century work is in orange, 12th-century in green, 13th-century in purple and 15th-century in blue; the site of the original altar, or possibly the foundation for the cross, is indicated by "A". Areas shaded grey indicate parts of the original 7th- and 8th-century concrete floor. Steps leading down to a burial vault are marked to the right of the semi-circular apse.

The first archaeological report on the then demolished church of St Mary was published by George Dowker in 1878. He described finding the foundations of the apsidal chancel and of the columns that formed part of the triple chancel arch, and noted that the original floor of the church was of concrete, or opus signinum, more than 6 inches (15 cm) thick. The floor had previously been described in 1782, prior to the church's demolition, as polished smooth and finished in red, a sample having been taken with difficulty using a pickaxe. Within the floor Dowker also found what he believed was the foundation for the stone cross described by Leland, and noted that the concrete floor appeared to have been laid around it. The floor of the chancel appeared to have been raised by about 10.5 inches (26.7 cm) when the chancel was extended in the Early English period, and had been covered with encaustic tiles. Dowker also reported hearing from a Mr Holmans about the existence of a large, circular burial vault at the east end of the chancel, containing coffins arranged in a circle. (Note: In a letter dated 7 May 1595, Archbishop John Whitgift of Canterbury gives his permission for Sir Cavalliero Maycote to create a burial vault for his family in the chancel at Reculver. Letters addressed to Mr Holman and Mrs Holman in 1862 and 1869 respectively were found in the King Ethelbert Inn at Reculver in 1999. John Holman was proprietor of the inn in about 1870, when he published a short guide to Reculver, in which the inn was commended for its "eggs and ham, and Margate ale", and was advertised as providing accommodation for tourists. A John Holman was also a farmer at Reculver in 1877 and 1878. In 1903, J. Russell Larkby named the "attendant" at the ruins as "Mr Holman".)

Further excavations were undertaken in the 1920s by C. R. Peers, who found that the nave of the original church had external doors on the north, south and west sides, and that the chancel had doors leading into the north and south porticus, which in turn had external doors on their eastern sides. (Note: According to Kelly 2008, p. 67(note), Peers' work is "the standard archaeological account of the church".) Regarding the concrete floor described by Dowker, Peers noted that the surface consisted of a thin layer of pounded brick, and believed that it was of the same date as the stone that Dowker described as the foundation for the stone cross. Excavations also revealed steps leading down to the burial vault reported by Dowker, although Peers did not refer to either the steps or the vault in his report. (Note: The location of the steps is illustrated at Peers 1927, p. 245, and Jessup 1936, p. 181. The vault does not appear to have been excavated.) Extensions of the porticus to the west and around the original west front were dated to no more than 100 years after the church was first built, and Peers observed that these extensions had been given the same type of floor as the original church. Drawing comparisons with the 7th-century chapel of St Peter-on-the-Wall at Bradwell-on-Sea, in Essex, and the abbey of St Augustine at Canterbury, Peers suggested that the original church at Reculver probably had windows set high in the northern and southern walls of the nave. Areas of wall found by archaeologists but now missing above ground are marked on the site by strips of concrete edged with flint. (Note: A photograph at Canterbury City Council 2008, p. 6, "View of late Norman ruins looking east", shows the curve of the 7th-century apse marked by a strip of concrete edged with flint. The burial vault reported at Dowker 1878, p. 261, lies between the apse and the further, eastern wall of the chancel. Two circles of concrete in the central area of grass mark the locations of the two columns that were part of the triple chancel arch, in front of which stood the stone cross. To the left and right of the concrete circles, the outlines of the 7th-century porticus can be seen, with gaps for the east-facing external doors: the standing walls beyond the doorways date to the 13th century.)

The church was found to have been free-standing, so any other monastic buildings must have stood apart. In 1966, archaeologists discovered the foundations of what they identified as probably a medieval building, rectangular and on an east-west axis, with its eastern wall aligned with that of the church precinct, which it pre-dated. Extending over and in contact with the western end of a Roman bath house, it stood a few yards east of the south-eastern corner of the 13th-century chancel. This building was not recorded by William Boys, who drew a plan of the Roman fort and the church in 1781. Otherwise no such buildings have been found, but they may all have been in the area to the north of the church, which has been lost to the sea. In this connection Peers noted that the cloisters of the early Canterbury churches of St Augustine's and Christ Church were both on their northern sides, and that St Augustine's had also been free-standing in the 7th century. A building that stood west-northwest of the church may have had an Anglo-Saxon doorway and the dimensions of an Anglo-Saxon church, and had "the appearance of having been part of some monastic erection". It was demolished after the sea weakened its foundations during storms in the winter of 1782. Leland reported another building outside the churchyard, where it was believed that a parish church had stood while the main church at Reculver was still a monastery: this building, formerly a chapel dedicated to St James, was later known as the "chapel-house", and stood in the north-eastern corner of the fort until it collapsed into the sea on 13 October 1802. Peers noted further that it seems to have had brick arches. (Note: In 1800 these buildings were described as follows: "[An] ancient gothic building, formerly the chapel of St. James, and belonging to the hermit of Reculver. It is now converted into a cottage, the walls of which are mostly composed of Roman bricks, and in the wall is an arch entirely so. [And] a small house, which has a religious gothic appearance, and is supposed to have been formerly the dwelling of the hermit, and king Richard II in his 3d year [22 June 1379 – 21 June 1380], granted a commission to Thomas Hamond, hermyte of the chapel of St. James, &c. being at our lady of Reculver, ordeyned for the sepulture of such persons as by casualtie of stormy or other misadventures were perished to receive the alms of charitable people for the building of the roof of the chapel fallen down." According to Jennifer Ward, the archbishop kept a hall at Reculver in the Middle Ages, "for his own visits, and those of [his] steward, treasurer and bailiff. [In 1273–74, this hall] was heightened and thatched". Ward raises the possibility that the hall in question was Ford Palace, which was near Hoath, in Reculver parish.)

== St John's Cathedral, Parramatta ==
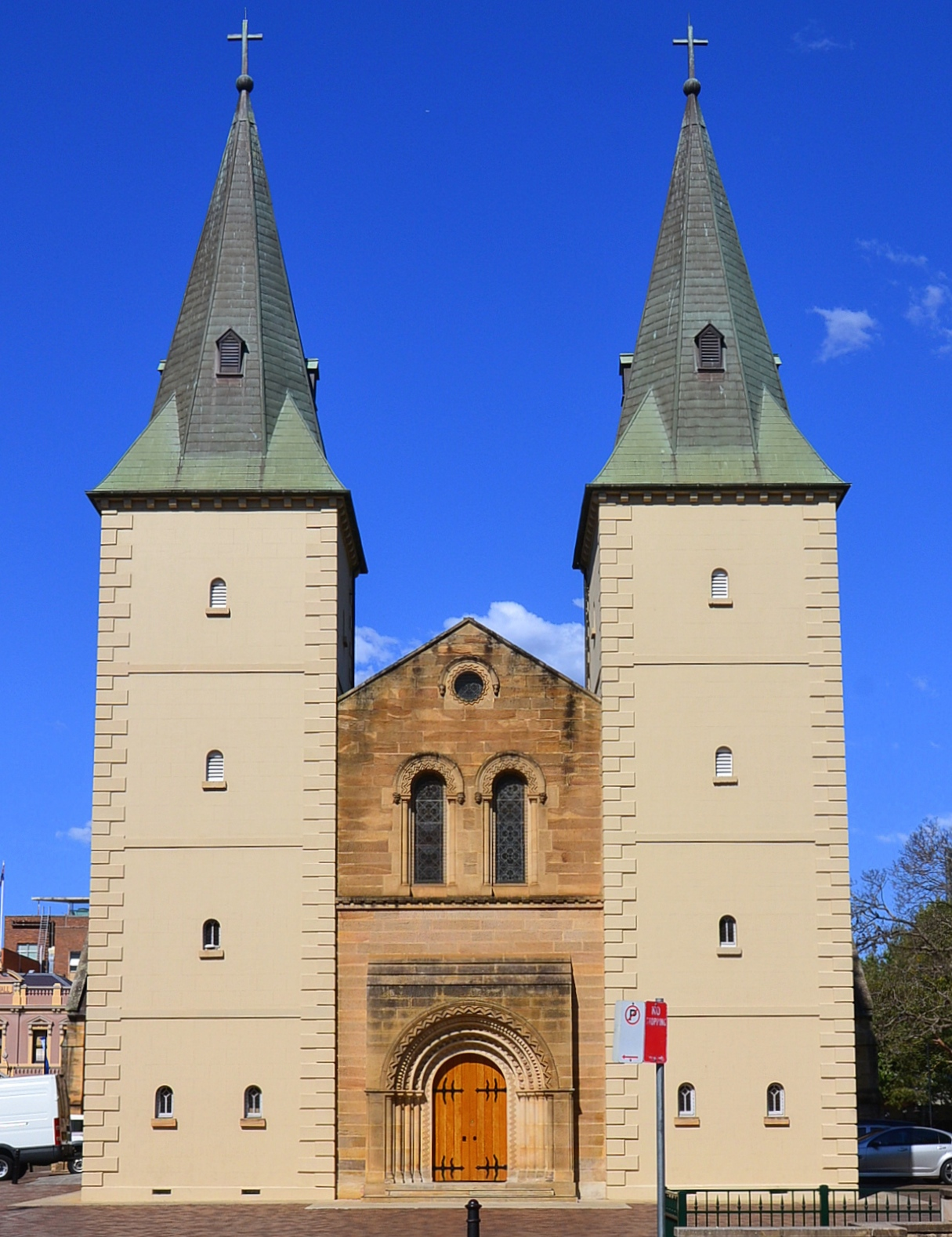
The facade of St John's Cathedral, Parramatta, NSW, Australia, in 2013

The design of the twin towers, spires and west front of St John's Cathedral, Parramatta, in Sydney, Australia, which were added in 1817–1819, is based on those of St Mary's Church at Reculver. Efforts to save St Mary's Church were under way when Governor Lachlan Macquarie and his wife Elizabeth left England for Australia in 1809. Elizabeth Macquarie asked John Watts, the governor's aide-de-camp from 1814 to 1819, to design the towers for St John's Cathedral, and these, together with its west front, are the oldest remaining parts of an Anglican church in Australia, and are on the oldest site of continuous Christian worship there. (Note: "Mrs Elizabeth Macquarie showed Lieutenant John Watts, Aide De Camp of the 46th Regiment a watercolour of the church and asked him to design some towers for [St John's, Parramatta]. A watercolour of Reculver Church in the [Mitchell Library section of the State Library of New South Wales] has a note in Macquarie's hand that he laid the foundation stone on 23 December 1818. Mrs Macquarie chose the plan and Lt. Watts was responsible for implementing the design". In the watercolour, the sea is shown washing against the cliff, and the spires have been replaced by the Trinity House wind vanes; the accompanying note is annotated with a reference to Jervis, J. (1935), "Parramatta During the Macquarie Period", Journal and Proceedings 4, Parramatta Historical Society, p. 163, saying that the note is "evidently a copy of what was evidently intended as an inscription upon the foundation stone of the towers of the Parramatta Church". The "46th Regiment" was the 46th (South Devonshire) Regiment of Foot.) In 1990 a stone from St Mary's Church was presented to St John's Cathedral by the Historic Building and Monuments Commission for England, now English Heritage.
