= Hatch bell foundry =

English manufacturer of large bells, c.1581–1664

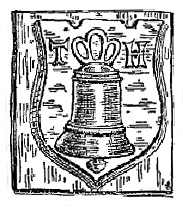
- Illustration of a foundry stamp of Thomas Hatch on a bell at Langley, Kent, cast in 1599
- Operated: c. 1581– 1664
- Location: Ulcombe, Kent, England
- Industry: Metalworking
- Products: Bells
- Owner: Hatch family

The Hatch bell foundry at Ulcombe, near Maidstone, in Kent, England, was operated by three generations of the Hatch family from 1581 or earlier until 1664. The bellfounders were based at nearby Broomfield from about 1587 until at least 1639. Joseph Hatch, bellfounder from 1602 to 1639, cast at least 155 bells, including "Bell Harry", after which the central tower of Canterbury Cathedral is named. Most Hatch bells were used in churches east of the River Medway in East Kent.

== The bellfounders ==
The first recorded member of the Hatch family of bellfounders, named Thomas, received payment for work in the church at Cranbrook, Kent, in 1581 and 1593. He also made bells for the church at Lyminge in 1585 and for St Margaret's Church, Canterbury, and the churches at Bearsted, Langley and Margate in 1599. In 1887, according to J. C. L. Stahlschmidt, the only remaining bells made by Thomas Hatch were the treble bells at Langley and in St Margaret's Church, Canterbury, the latter being "cracked and useless". (Note: "This treble bell has had an eventful life. Before 1902 the inscription read: 'By me Thomas Hatch T M C W 1599' and underneath the date was a crowned rose. [In] 1902, we learn from the [St Margaret's, Canterbury,] parish magazine of that year, ... an estimate [was] received from Goslin of the Bishopsgate foundry for £55 to recast the [bell] and repair the framework and chiming apparatus. ... [T]he bell ..., one of only two left in Kent by Thomas Hatch, fell to pieces in getting it down." It was recast in 1902, and installed in St Peter's Church, Canterbury, in 1969.) Stahlschmidt also wrote that a Bible belonging to the Hatch family gave Thomas Hatch's year of death as 1599, but he noted that a Thomas Hatch was recorded as a churchwarden for Broomfield, near Maidstone, in 1603. (Note: Stahlschmidt also found Thomas Hatch's name in a marriage licence of 1601.) A bell cast in 1602 for the church at Waltham, Kent, bears Thomas Hatch's foundry stamp of a bell on a shield with the letters "T" and "H" on either side, but the bell also bears the legend Iosephvs Hatch Me Fecit, meaning 'Joseph Hatch made me', in reference to Thomas Hatch's son Joseph. Robert H. Goodsall, writing in 1970, noted that marriage bonds were provided by a "Thomas Hatch of Broomfield, bellfounder", in December 1607, for the marriage of one Joseph Hatch, also a bellfounder of Broomfield, and Jane Prowd of Canterbury: this Thomas Hatch could have been either Joseph Hatch's father or a brother of the same name.

The bell cast for Waltham in 1602 was probably the first made by Joseph Hatch, who otherwise used a foundry stamp of a circle containing three bells, for example on two bells cast in the same year for Egerton. (Note: A representation of Joseph Hatch's inscription on a bell in St Martin's Church, Herne, cast by him in 1621, is at Offen 1984, p. 80.) In 1887 there remained 155 of his bells in Kent, and in 1969 there were 19 in Canterbury alone. While there were "probably a good many more of which no records have come to light", bells may also have been cast by him for buildings other than churches. Among Joseph Hatch's output was the bell known as "Bell Harry", dated 1635, after which the central tower of Canterbury Cathedral is known. (Note: Bell Harry is rung every day for matins and evensong, and to signal the death of the monarch or the Archbishop of Canterbury. The bell is hung "dead", or fixed, in a shelter on the roof of the tower, "and is sounded by means of an electro-magnetic hammer." "[T]radition affirms [Bell Harry] to have been the gift of Henry VIII, and to have been brought out of France. If this be correct – and the name given to it seems corroborative – it has been recast, as it now bears the date 1635.") Stahlschmidt wrote that, in 1887, there remained complete rings of bells by Joseph Hatch in the churches at Boughton Malherbe, Fordwich, High Halden, Waltham and Wouldham, all in Kent. (Note: Stahlschmidt noted in 1887 that many of Joseph Hatch's bells may have been recast, as were two at Barming. Other bells survived in 1887 but had been displaced, such as two of four cast by him in 1635 for St Mary's Church, Reculver, one of which was hanging in Reculver's replacement church at Hillborough and another in the church at Badlesmere; the other two were probably melted. The bell at Hillborough was stolen in 1970. In 1929, four of his bells that had hung in the church of St Mary's Northgate, Canterbury, one of which had been recast in 1813, were given to Bishop Nelson Fogarty for use in St George's Cathedral, Windhoek, in Damaraland, now in Namibia: only one was put to this use, the other three being used elsewhere in Damaraland. Three of Joseph Hatch's bells hanging in St George's Church, Canterbury, were destroyed in an air raid in 1942, during the Second World War. In 1969 it was reported that one bell made by Joseph Hatch in 1625 and hanging in St Margaret's Church, Canterbury, was to be moved to the parish of Droxford, in Hampshire, and another was to be moved to Newchurch, on Romney Marsh.) He also observed that Joseph Hatch's bell-foundry business over 37 to 38 years "may fairly be described as enormous". (Note: According to Stahlschmidt, and in particular reference to the Whitechapel Bell Foundry, in Joseph Hatch's time he and another bell foundry at Borden, near Sittingbourne, "practically drove the London men out of the field [in Kent].") In addition to the provisions of his written will, Joseph Hatch made oral bequests totalling £240 on 13 September 1639, the day before he died.

There was no explicit reference to the bell foundry in Joseph Hatch's will, and it may be that, while he was childless, it had already been passed on to his nephew William Hatch, who is described in the will as Joseph Hatch's servant. Stahlschmidt understood "servant" to mean "foreman", since William Hatch's initials occur on bells cast by Joseph Hatch from 1633. The business was disrupted in William Hatch's time by the English Civil War (1642–1651), and he is only known to have cast 25 bells, including rings at Lower Halstow and Minster-in-Sheppey. He died in 1664, and the bell foundry was discontinued.

== The bell foundry ==
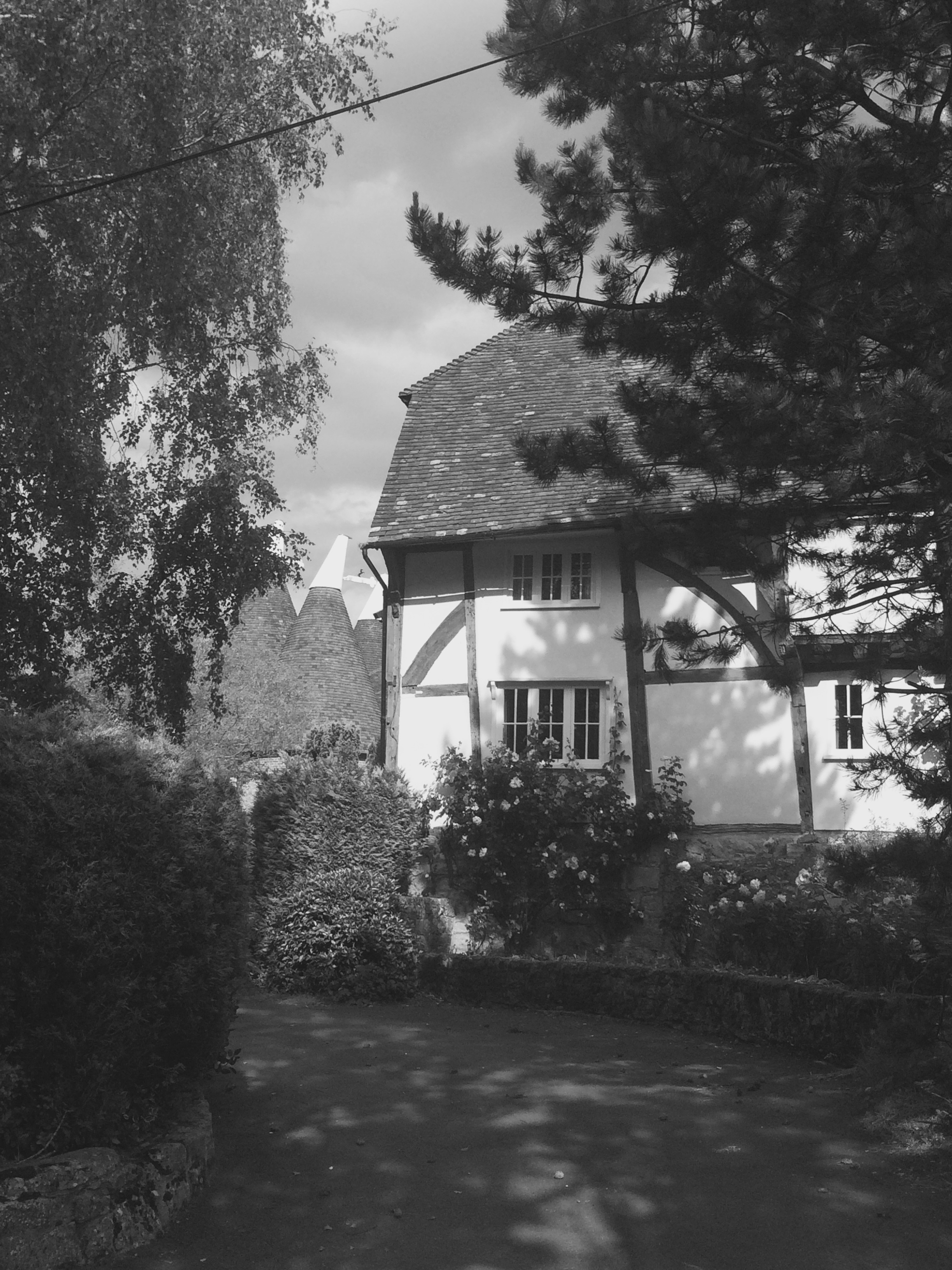
Roses farmhouse, Broomfield, near Maidstone, a partial survival of a Wealden hall house and home to the Hatch family of bellfounders from the late 16th century until 1639

Stahlschmidt suspected that Thomas Hatch was first based in Canterbury, but, from late in the 16th century, the Hatch family of bellfounders was based at Roses Farm, Broomfield, near Maidstone, where Thomas Hatch may have first taken up residence in 1587. (Note: "Cowper's Canterbury Marriage Licences (First Series) contains the record: 'Hatch, Thomas, of Tenterden, and Margaret King, of Cranbrook, w[idow], Sept[ember] 22, 1587', perhaps he became tenant of Roses Farm at this time.") In 1889, W. Scott Robertson noted that the property of Roses Farm straddled the boundary between the parishes of Broomfield and Ulcombe: in a receipt for work on the bells at Birchington-on-Sea in 1606 Joseph Hatch described himself as "of Bromfeild", and he was buried in the churchyard at Broomfield, but he said in his will of 1639 that he was "of Ulcombe". (Note: Two title deeds for Roses Farm, both dated 1 April 1606, bear the endorsement "The mark I. H. of Joseph Hatch".) Stahlschmidt considered it unlikely that the foundry was among the property bequeathed to Joseph Hatch's widow Jane, which included the main dwelling-house of Roses Farm, in Broomfield, and a smaller house adjacent, so it must have lain elsewhere. Bellfounding did not require dedicated buildings, and bells were sometimes cast in the vicinity of the churches for which they were made, but Stahlschmidt also reported a statement by James T. Hatch, a descendant of the same family, that the Hatch foundry was:

on the north side of King's Wood, in Ulcombe (which wood extends also into the parishes of Broomfield, Leeds and Langley), in a field [then called] 'the Welmonground', evidently a corruption of 'the bellman's ground,' and the scoriæ and debris remained upon the site within my time and memory. (Note: "Scoriae" are pieces of metal slag.)

— J. C. L. Stahlschmidt, The Church Bells of Kent: Their Inscriptions, Founders, Uses and Traditions (1887)

The Hatch bell foundry was thus located adjacent to the Weald, giving easy access to skilled metalworkers from the local iron industry and a plentiful supply of cheap charcoal, used to fuel the foundry. (Note: "The work of casting would have called for the services of a number of skilled craftsmen who would have lived in the surrounding district".) From their bells would have been carted to their destinations, some across the River Medway into West Kent, but most to East Kent. (Note: In 1606–1607 1s.8d. (9p) was paid "for fetching the great bell [of Cranbrook] from Broomfield". In 1640–1641, £12.8s. (£12.40) was paid to "belfounder [sic] ... Hatch" for "casting the greate bell [for Aylesford] and for the new mettall w[hich] was put in [and] ... [14s. (70p) was paid for] carying the said bell to casting and fetching the said bell home againe". In 1662–1663, 6s. (30p) was "spent [at Bethersden] when the Bellfounder [William Hatch] tooke the bells to cast ... [and 1s.2d. (6p) was spent] when the bell was taken out of the waggon when shee was brought home".) That the foundry produced items other than bells is indicated by a mortar held at Maidstone Museum, cast in bell metal, and bearing the initials "TH" and the year 1590.
