= Joseph Clarke (architect) =

British architect (1819–1888)

- Born: 27 March 1819
- Died: 9 March 1888 (aged 68)
- Occupation: Architect
- Projects: Gloucester and Bristol Diocesan Training Institution; Culham College

Joseph Clarke FRIBA (1819–1888) was a British Gothic Revival architect who practised in London, England.

== Career ==
In 1839, Clarke exhibited an antiquarian drawing with the Oxford Society for Promoting the Study of Gothic Architecture. He was made an Associate of the Royal Institute of British Architects (RIBA) in 1841 and a Fellow of the RIBA in 1850. He became a member of the Ecclesiological Society in 1853. He served as Diocesan Surveyor to the sees of Canterbury and Rochester, and from 1871 to the see of St Albans. He was also Consultant Architect to the Charity Commissioners.

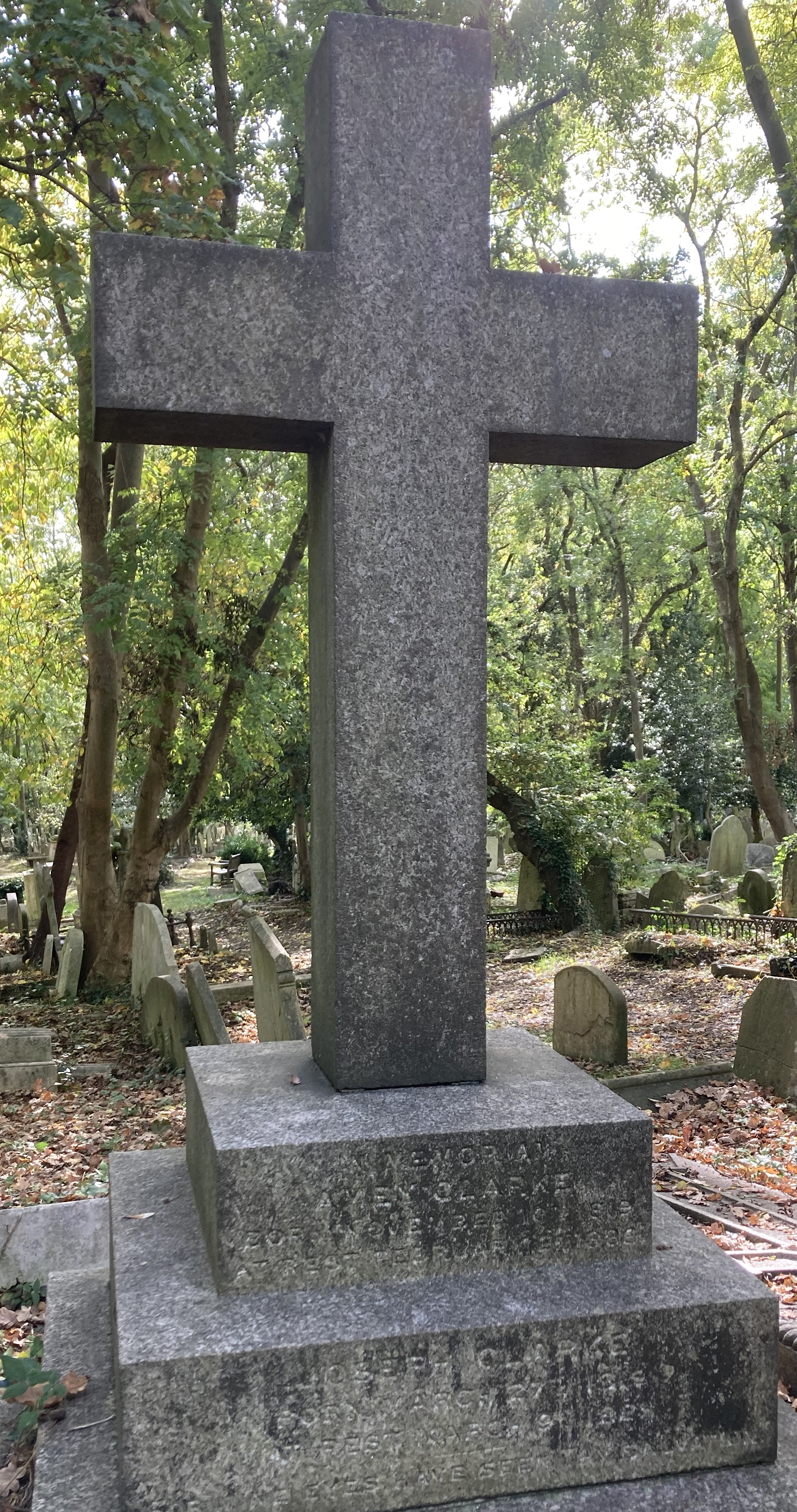
Grave of Joseph Clarke in Highgate Cemetery

In 1852, Clarke published Schools and Schoolhouses: a series of Views, Plans, and Details, for Rural Parishes. In this he condemned the set of model plans issued by the Committee of Council on Education as "unsuitable in every way" and stressed the advantages of employing an architect for every new school, rather than relying on a standardised design:

The plan should always be formed to the site, and reference had to local materials; the design of the school, again, should conform to the materials. Brick and stone each require their separate uses, and so their several applications.

The book included plans of twelve schools he had built in Kent, Essex and Oxfordshire, at Monks Horton, Lydd, Little Bentley, Coggeshall, Clifton Hampton, Coopershall, Wellesborough, Brabourne, Boreham, Foxearth, Hatfield and Leigh (Essex).

He drew up ambitious plans for an extension to the House of Charity in Greek Street Soho, including a chapel, refectory, dormitories and cloisters, although only the chapel (begun 1862) was built. His association with commissions in Oxfordshire make it possible that he was the "Joseph Clarke, esq., architect" who presented plans for restoring the gatehouse at Rye, the intended scene of the Rye House Plot, to the Oxford Architectural Society in May 1842.

Clarke exhibited at the Royal Academy between 1845 and 1870. The exhibition catalogues give his address as 1, Lincoln's Inn Fields, from 1845 to 1850; and 13, Stratford Place, thereafter.

He is buried on the eastern side of Highgate Cemetery.

== Work ==
=== Buildings ===
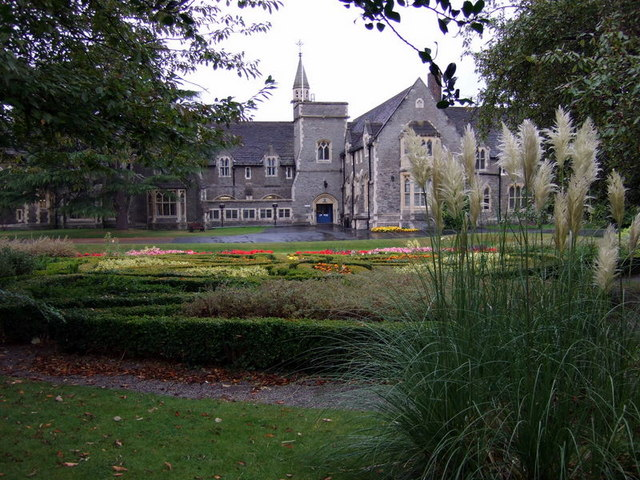
Gloucester and Bristol Diocesan Training Institution, Fishponds, Gloucestershire: designed with John Norton, built 1852

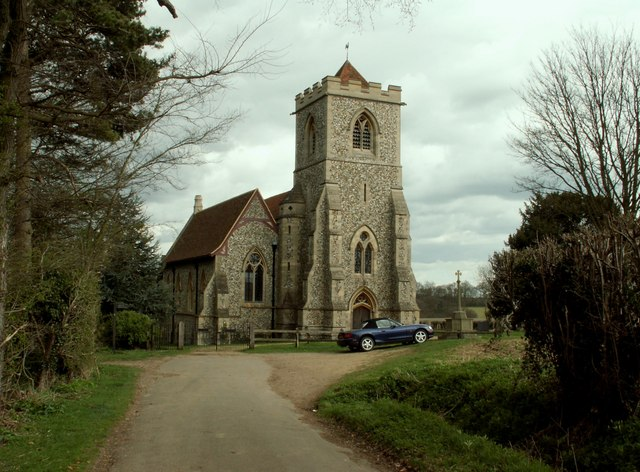
St Mary the Virgin parish church, Farnham, Essex, built 1858–59

- St Mary and St Nicholas parish church, Littlemore, Oxfordshire: chancel and tower, 1848
- St Mary's parish church, Garsington, Oxfordshire: restoration, 1849
- St Paul's parish church, Culham, Oxfordshire: rebuilding, 1852
- Culham College, Culham, Oxfordshire, 1852 (now the European School, Culham)
- Gloucester and Bristol Diocesan Training Institution, Fishponds, Gloucestershire (in partnership with John Norton of London), 1852 (later St Matthias' College)
- All Saints Church, Cockermouth, Cumbria, 1854
- Holy Trinity parish church, Ardington, Berkshire (now Oxfordshire): tower and spire, 1856
- St John the Baptist's parish church, Wateringbury, Kent: restoration and south aisle, 1856
- St Alban's parish church, Rochdale, Lancashire, 1856 (demolished 1973)
- St Mary's parish church, Slaugham, West Sussex: restoration, 1857–1860
- St Mary the Virgin parish church, Farnham, Essex, 1858–59
- St Stephen's parish church, Congleton, Cheshire, 1860
- St Luke's parish church, Heywood, Lancashire (now Greater Manchester), 1860–1862
- St James' parish church, Aston, Oxfordshire: restoration, 1862
- St Mary's chapel of ease, Shifford, Oxfordshire, 1863
- St John the Baptist parish church, Niton, Isle of Wight: new churchyard cross on 15th-century base, 1865
- St Paul's parish church, Choppington, Northumberland, 1866
- St Michael's parish church, Bishop's Stortford, Hertfordshire: alterations to chancel and ceilings, extension of north aisle, 1868–69
- St Mary's parish church, Apsley, Hertfordshire, 1871
- St Peter's Church, Woodmansterne, Surrey, 1876–77
- St Mary the Virgin parish church, Hillborough, for Reculver parish, 1876–1878
- Holy Trinity parish church, Beckenham, Kent, 1878
- All Saints', Friern Barnet, London
- Holy Cross Church, Hoath, Kent: restoration, north aisle added, new roofs and north arcade, new fittings including font, pulpit and pews, 1866–67

=== Writings ===
- A Series of Views, plans, and Details, for Rural Schoolhouses. London: J. Masters. 1852.

== Sources ==
- Bettley, James; Pevsner, Nikolaus (2007). Essex. The Buildings of England. Yale University Press. ISBN 978-0-300-11614-4.
- Brodie, Antonia; Felstead, Alison; Franklin, Jonathan; Pinfield, Leslie; Oldfield, Jane, eds. (2001). Directory of British Architects 1834–1914, A-K. London & New York: Continuum. p. 383. ISBN 0-8264-5513-1.
- Colvin, H.M. (1997). A Biographical Dictionary of British Architects, 1600–1840. New Haven: Yale University Press. pp. 1065–1067. ISBN 0-300-07207-4.
- Eastlake, Charles Locke (1872). A History of the Gothic Revival. London: Longman, Green & Co. p. 402.
- Graves, Algernon (1905). The Royal Academy: A Complete Dictionary of Contributors from its Foundations in 1769 to 1904. Vol. 3. London: Henry Graves.
- Nairn, Ian; Pevsner, Nikolaus (1971) [1962]. The Buildings of England: Surrey (2nd ed.). Harmondsworth: Penguin Books. ISBN 0-300-09675-5.
- Newman, John (1969). West Kent and the Weald. Buildings of England. Harmondsworth: Penguin Books. ISBN 978-0-300-09614-9.
- Newman, John (1976). North East and East Kent. Buildings of England. Harmondsworth: Penguin Books. ISBN 978-0-14-071039-7.
- Pevsner, Nikolaus (1966). Berkshire. The Buildings of England. Harmondsworth: Penguin Books. p. 66.
- Pevsner, Nikolaus; Lloyd, David (1967). Hampshire and the Isle of Wight. The Buildings of England. Harmondsworth: Penguin Books. p. 754.
- Salter, Mike (2000). The Old Parish Churches of Sussex. Malvern: Folly Publications. ISBN 1-871731-40-2.
- Sheppard, F.H.W., ed. (1966). "Soho Square Area: Portland Estate: No. 1 Greek Street: The House of St. Barnabas-in-Soho". Survey of London: volumes 33 and 34: St Anne Soho. London: Institute of Historical Research.
- Sherwood, Jennifer; Pevsner, Nikolaus (1974). Oxfordshire. The Buildings of England. Harmondsworth: Penguin Books. ISBN 0-14-071045-0.
