= Ymar =

Anglo-Saxon saint

Saint Ymar of Reculver

Martyr
- Born: unknown
- Died: c. 830
- Venerated in: Roman Catholic Church; Eastern Orthodox Church; Anglican Communion
- Feast: 12 November

Ymar of Reculver (died c. 830) is an Anglo-Saxon saint.

== Background ==
A Benedictine monk of Reculver, Ymar was killed by Danish warriors. His name may be the source of the toponym Margate. A legend states that he had a dying wish to be buried in St Johns parish church in Margate. Sometime before 1407 the body of St Ymar was brought from Reculver, where he had been a monk, and buried in St John the Baptist's church, Margate. Tradition insists that an old stone coffin lid at that church is his.
