= St Nicholas-at-Wade =

Village in Kent, England

Coordinates: 51.354°N 1.252°E

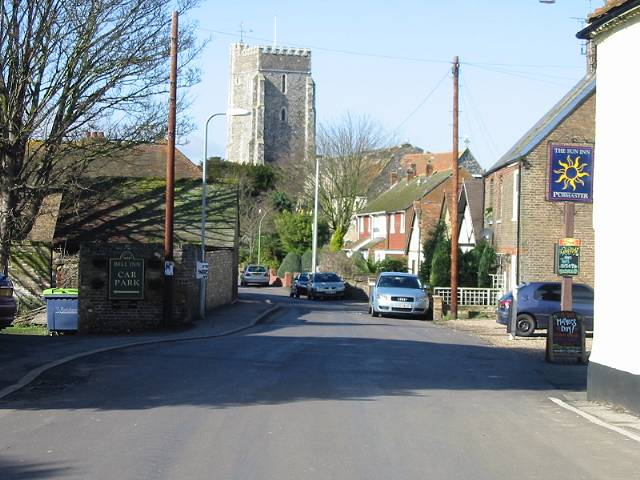
- The Street, St Nicholas-at-Wade

- Location within Kent
- Interactive map of St Nicholas-at-Wade
- Population: 853 (2011)
- OS grid reference: TR2666
- Civil parish: St Nicholas-at-Wade
- District: Thanet
- Shire county: Kent
- Region: South East
- Country: England
- Sovereign state: United Kingdom
- Post town: Birchington
- Postcode district: CT7
- Dialling code: 01843
- Police: Kent
- Fire: Kent
- Ambulance: South East Coast
- UK Parliament: Herne Bay and Sandwich

St Nicholas-at-Wade (or St Nicholas) is both a village and a civil parish in the Thanet District of Kent, England. The parish had a recorded population of 782 at the 2001 Census, increasing to 852 at the 2011 census. The village of Sarre is part of the civil parish.

The village is best known locally for the local custom of Hoodening, a type of mumming, as well as for its prolific potato production. The village continues to play host to several folk groups, including Offcumduns Border Morris Dancers.

== History ==
The name derives from its location on the western border of the Isle of Thanet (originally separated from the Kent mainland). Before the channels of the River Wantsum and River Stour silted up, one would have been able to 'wade' at this point, over a ford. In Roman times the channel was navigable and the site likely very busy with the Saxon Shore forts of Regulbium (Reculver) and Rutupiae (Richborough) both close by. Remains of Roman shipbuilding yards are said to have been found between St. Nicholas-at-Wade and the nearby village of Sarre

== Village ==
The village can be entered from either the A299 (Thanet Way) or the A28 (Canterbury Road). These approaches to the village stand out with their colourful planters welcoming visitors. St John's Green at the A28 entry point displays several items including a 1919 restored cultivator in its original makers colours.

There are two public houses, 'The Bell' and 'The Sun'. There is also a post office, an antiques shop and a farm marketing office. One of the main potato suppliers in the country used to have its headquarters near St Nicholas Court in the northwest of the village, but the site closed in late 2015. Hedgend Industrial Estate is on the northern outskirts. There is the local St Nicholas CE Primary School.

The village hall (dating from 1930) houses weekly events including various dance classes, keep fit, Art groups and senior citizens coffee mornings and is also used as a polling station. There is a static caravan park at Frost Farm and a camping site at Streete Farm.

A sports field in Bell Meadow plays host to football and cricket matches, the cricket pavilion was constructed in the 1980s with the aid of Thanet District Council.

== Churches ==
The 13th-century parish church of St Nicholas, after which the village and parish are named, was a chapel of ease for St Mary's Church at Reculver. The first rector is recorded as Adam de Brancestre in 1294. Built in flint, the church houses some fine 16th-century brasses, a carved oak pulpit dated 1615, and a coat of arms of King George III. The parish has twice been enlarged, firstly in medieval times, when it was separated from the parish of Reculver and joined with the little-known chapelry of All Saints, Shuart in 1310, and again in the mid-16th century, when it was joined with the parish of St Giles, Sarre. The church is currently part of the Wantsum Benefice.

St Nicholas Court has a fine example of a medieval underground chapel; however, little is known about the origins or past use of this building. The chapel is on private land but has been opened to visitors on some important local occasions.

== See also ==
- Listed buildings in St Nicholas-at-Wade
