= Hillborough =

Area of Herne Bay, England

Coordinates: 51.3676°N 1.1742°E

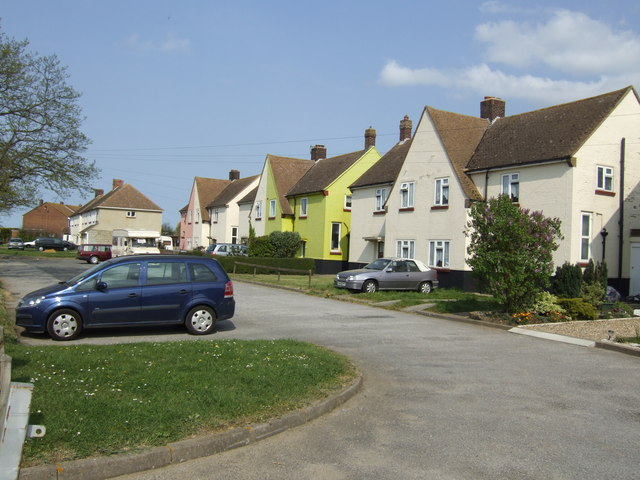
- Houses in Hillborough

- Location within Kent
- District: City of Canterbury
- Shire county: Kent
- Region: South East
- Country: England
- Sovereign state: United Kingdom
- Post town: Canterbury
- Postcode district: CT6
- Police: Kent
- Fire: Kent
- Ambulance: South East Coast
- UK Parliament: Herne Bay and Sandwich

Hillborough is an area of eastern Herne Bay in Kent, England. The population is included in the Reculver ward of Herne Bay.
