= Sarre Penn =

Tributary of the River Stour in Kent, England

Coordinates: 51°20′17″N 1°13′50″E

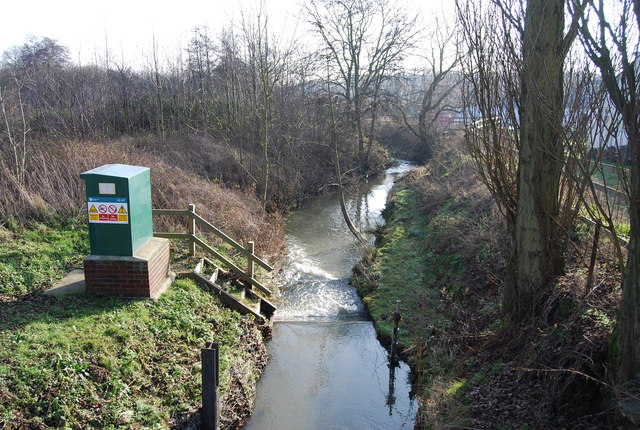
Gauging station on the Sarre Penn near Calcott

Sarre Penn is a tributary of the River Stour in Kent, England, joining with the River Wantsum near Sarre, where it is known locally as the Fishbourne Stream.

The stream runs from its source in the parish of Dunkirk, north of Canterbury, 13.4 kilometres, to the Wantsum Channel and the Stour, it travels north east, running parallel to the Great Stour river, with the Roman road (A28) running in between. The stream passes through the Blean Woods National Nature Reserve and the villages of Blean and Tyler Hill.
