= Plucks Gutter =

Hamlet in Kent, England

Coordinates: 51.3248°N 1.2559°E

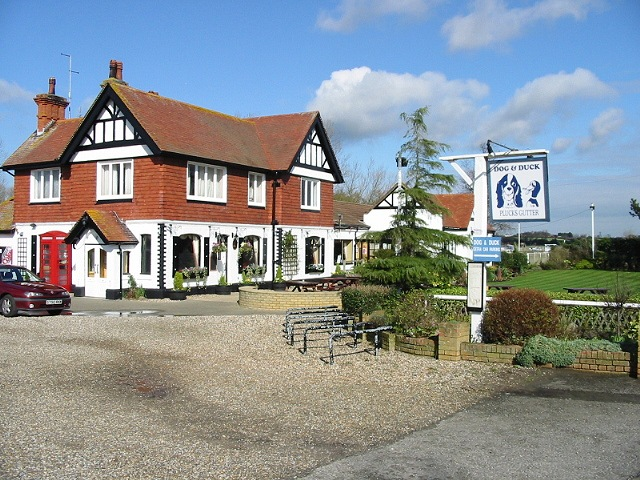
- The Dog and Duck pub, Plucks Gutter

- Location within Kent
- OS grid reference: TR2663
- District: Dover
- Shire county: Kent
- Region: South East
- Country: England
- Sovereign state: United Kingdom
- Post town: Canterbury
- Postcode district: CT3
- Police: Kent
- Fire: Kent
- Ambulance: South East Coast

Plucks Gutter is a hamlet in the civil parish of Stourmouth, Kent, England. The hamlet is situated where the Little Stour and Great Stour rivers meet.

== Etymology ==
The hamlet is named after a Dutch Drainage Engineer called Ploeg, whose grave is in All Saints Church, West Stourmouth. Ploeg, being the Dutch for a plough, the hamlet takes its origins from the Dutch Protestant tradition of draining marshland by creating a ploughed ditch.

== History ==
A mile upstream from the Dog and Duck Inn public house is 'Blood Point', where King Alfred defeated a Viking invasion force, which is often taken to be the Royal Navy's first successful engagement of a foe.

During the Middle Ages, the two rivers met the Wantsum Channel at Stourmouth, but the combined rivers now (called the River Stour downstream from Plucks Gutter) flow onward to the sea via Sandwich to Pegwell Bay near Ramsgate, leaving Plucks Gutter six miles in a straight line and ten by river from the English Channel.

In 1821–23, a North Kent Gang of smugglers used Pluck's Gutter. One account from a Revenue Officer stated they travelled fourteen miles on foot, through Trenleypark Wood to Stodmarsh, then via Grove Corner to Pluck's Gutter, where they crossed the river by the ferry, and onward north-east to Mount Pleasant near Acol, then to Marsh Bay – the former name for what is modern-day Westgate-on-Sea.

== Amenities ==
In the hamlet is a riverside inn with a holiday caravan and lodge park, and facilities for non-residential riverside moorings.

The old ferry cottage (an earlier public house), is the eponymous 'House at Plucks Gutter' and was the inspiration for the book of the same name by Manning Coles. The freeholder of the cottage has an obligation to provide services to any officer of one of 'His Majesty's Ships of War' lying in the Wantsum Channel as payment to the Crown for the rights to operate the ferry.

Fishing on the river is controlled by the Wantsum Angling Association and Plucks Gutter is a location for fishing competitions; Pike, bream and roach are most commonly caught, with ducks, swans and kingfishers seen. Representatives from two of local rowing clubs (The King’s School Canterbury Boat Club and Spitfire Boat Club), undergoing medium- to long- distance inland water "steady state" training.

River trips run from Sandwich to Plucks Gutter.

== Transport ==
The hamlet is served by local buses each weekday (other than Bank Holidays), from Canterbury to Westwood Cross Shopping Centre via Wingham and Minster railway station. The nearest railway stations are at Minster (with services to Ramsgate, Ashford, London Charing Cross and London St Pancras), and Birchington (with services to Ramsgate, Faversham, Medway, Victoria & St Pancras).
