= River Stour, Kent =

Great Stour
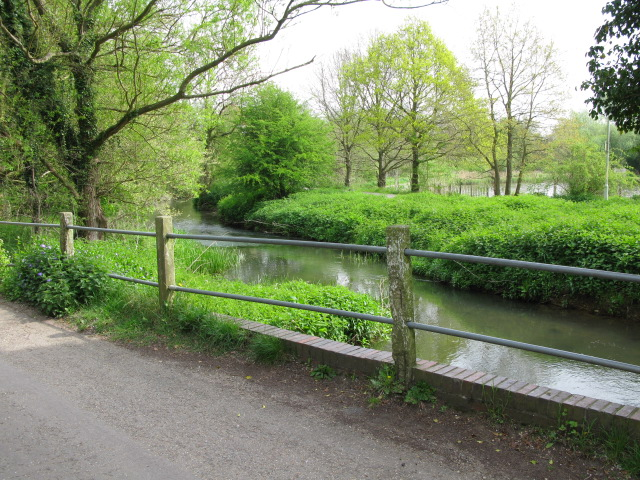

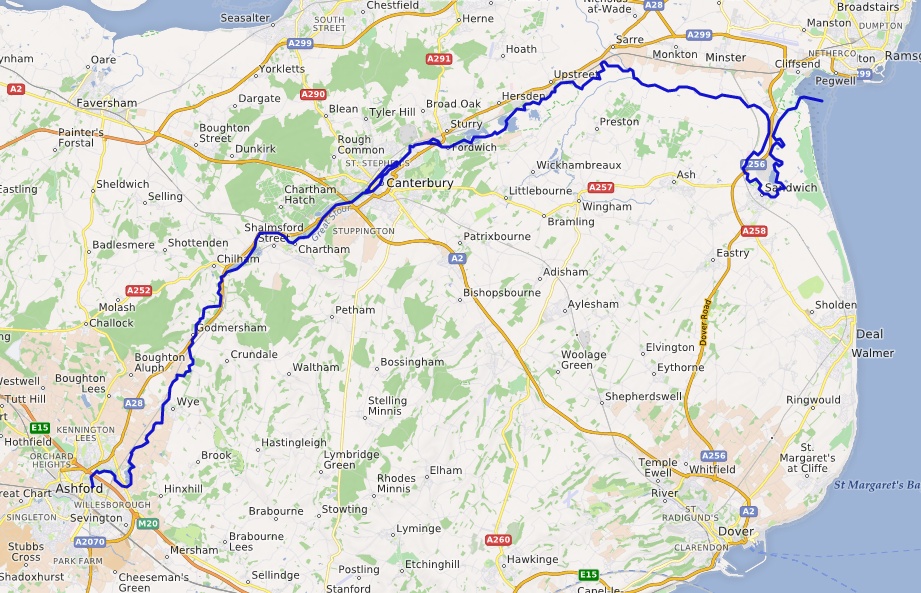

Location
- Country: England
- County: Kent
- Towns/Cities: Ashford, Canterbury, Sandwich

Physical characteristics
- Source
  - location: Lenham
- Mouth
  - location: Pegwell Bay

The River Stour (/ˈstaʊər/, rhymes with "hour" or "tower") is a river in Kent, England that flows into the North Sea at Pegwell Bay. Above Plucks Gutter, where the Little Stour joins it, the river is normally known as the Great Stour. The upper section of the river, above its confluence with the East Stour at Ashford is sometimes known as the Upper Great Stour or West Stour. In the tidal lower reaches, the artificial Stonar Cut short cuts a large loop in the natural river.

The Stour has Kent's second largest catchment area (the River Medway having the largest). The lower part of the river is tidal; its original mouth was on the Wantsum Channel, an important sea route in ancient and medieval times. The river has three major tributaries, and many minor ones. For much of its length, it flows in generally northeast.

The historic city of Canterbury is situated on the river, as are the former Cinque Port of Sandwich and the railway town of Ashford. The route of the Stour Valley Walk follows the river.

== Course ==
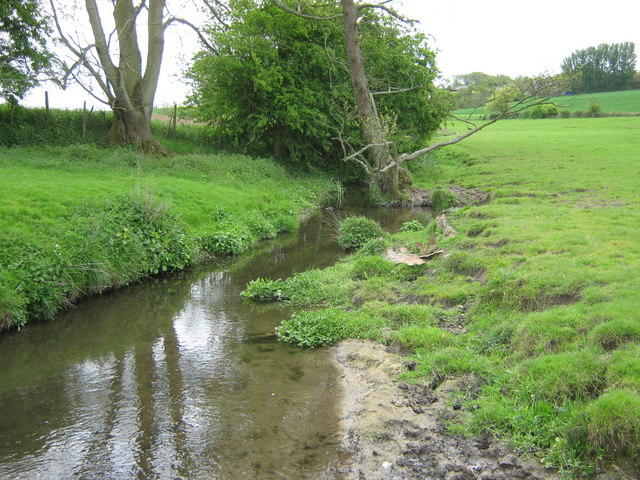
The Great Stour near its source

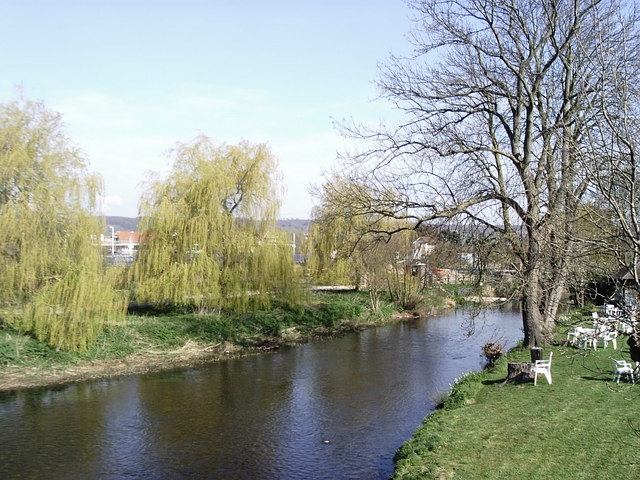
The Great Stour at Wye

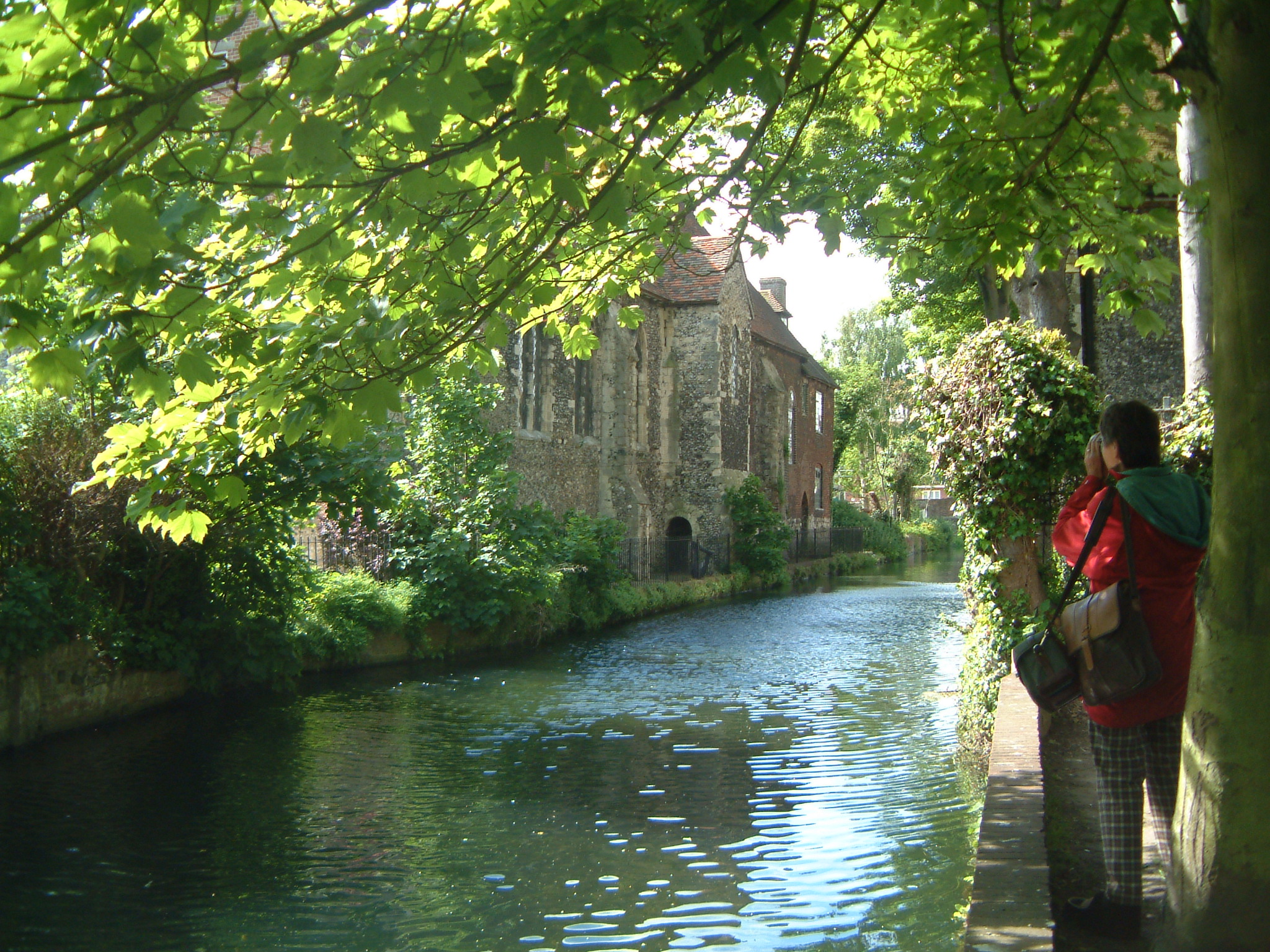
A branch of the Stour passes Blackfriars in Canterbury

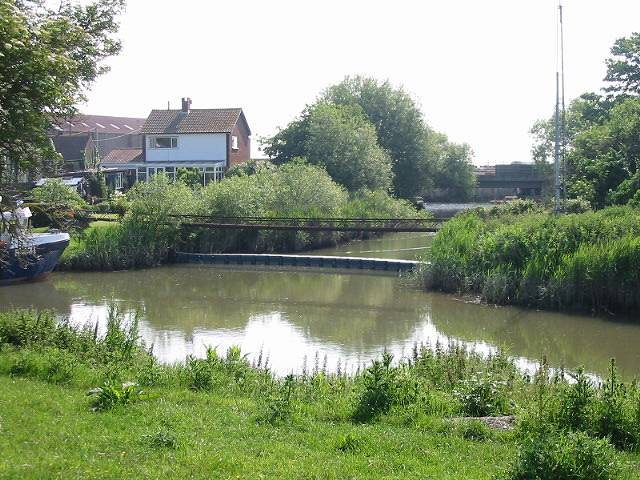
Stonar Cut and the A256 crossing

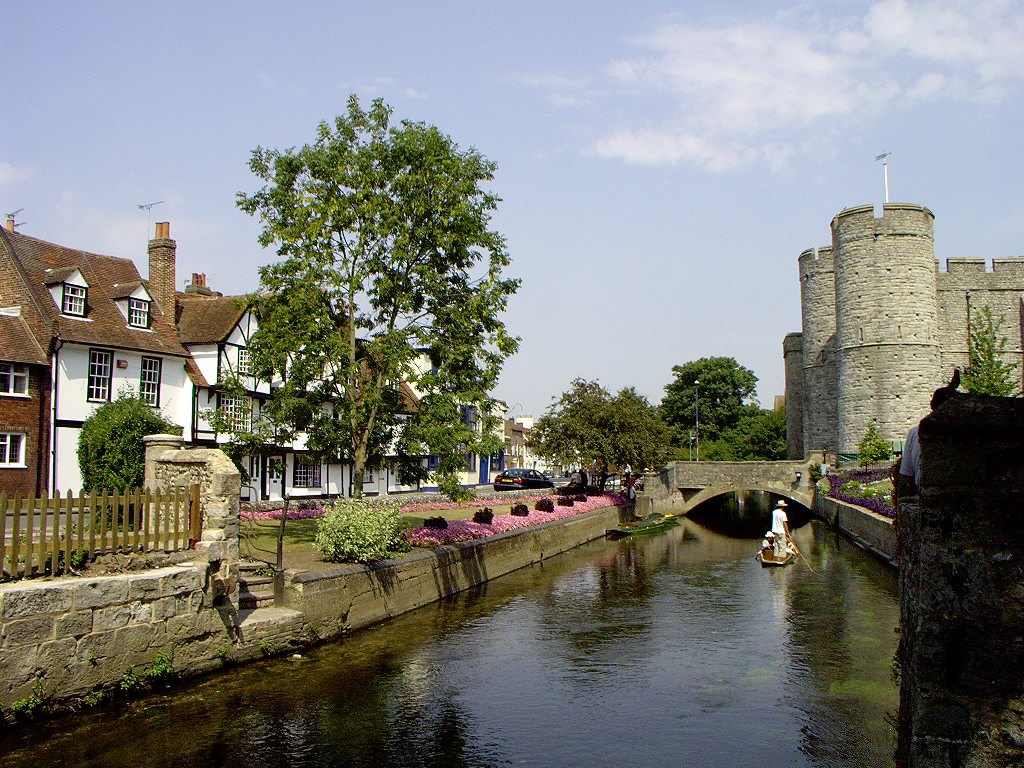
A branch of the Great Stour in Westgate Gardens, outside the Canterbury city walls

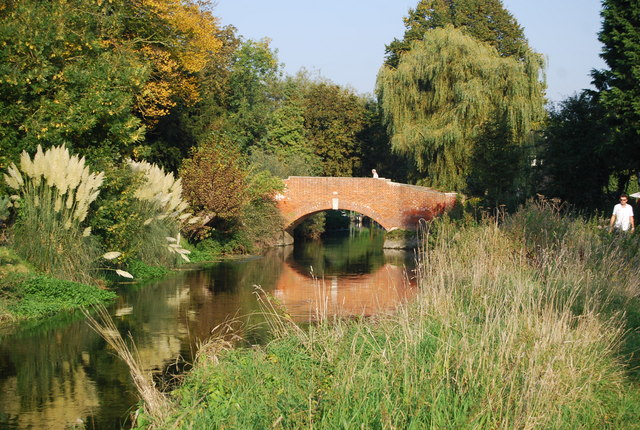
The Great Stour in Fordwich

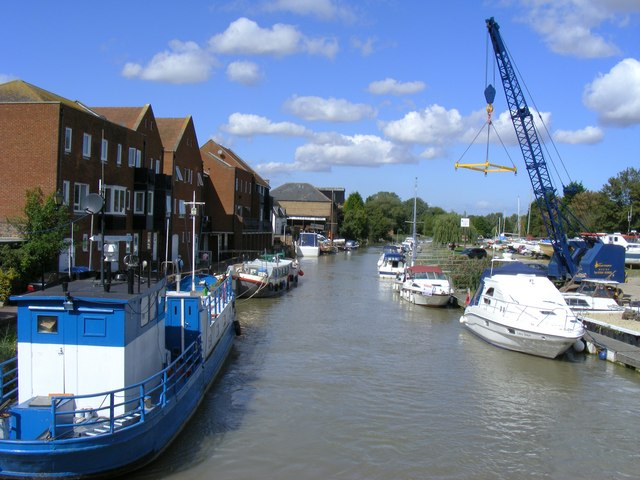
Boats on the River Stour at Sandwich

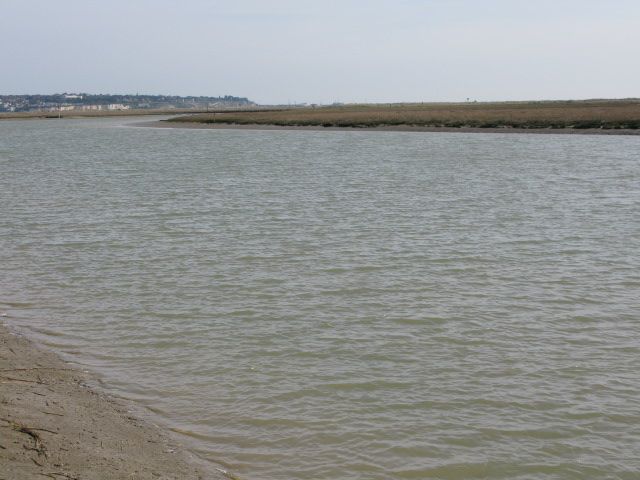
The River Stour near to its mouth

=== Upper Great Stour ===
The source, of what is known at that point as the Great Stour, is near the village of Lenham, within a short distance of the River Len, a tributary of the Medway. The source is at a high elevation close to the North Downs escarpment. At first, the river flows south east in a narrow valley parallel to the escarpment and the Greensand ridge to the south, before breaking through the ridge near Hothfield into a broad valley. Three small streams enter from the north, having their headwaters on the close to Downs escarpment. Flood defences can turn this valley into a large lake and an embankment has had to be built to prevent overflow into the Medway catchment barely 100 metres (330 ft) away to the south. The river turns north east by the village of Great Chart in the direction of its outlet to the sea.

The confluence with the East Stour, flowing from its source near Hythe, is to be found at Pledge's Mill at the bottom of East Hill in Ashford.

=== Lower Great Stour ===
The town of Ashford marks the start of the middle section of the river, sited at a crossing point of the river and on ancient track ways. In Ashford, the river helps form part of the Ashford Green Corridor.

After Ashford, the Stour breaches the North Downs; for most of this distance there are no tributaries. After the Brook stream enters from the right, there are now 15 miles (24 km) to Canterbury. In this stretch the river flows through the villages of Wye, Chilham and Chartham, with Wye being a fordable crossing.

The historic city of Canterbury lies at the junction of four branches of the Roman road Watling Street which connected Canterbury with ports around the Kent coast – Lympne, Dover, Richborough and Reculver. Within the city, the river flows in two channels, one through the centre of the city, and the other to the north of the city walls. The two channels rejoin to the east of Canterbury, before the river reaches Fordwich, a former outport of Canterbury and the current tidal limit of the river.

Beyond Fordwich, the river passes between several former gravel pits and through the reed beds of the Stodmarsh National Nature Reserve. Beyond the nature reserve lies the open farmland on the reclaimed marshes surrounding the river crossing at Grove Ferry, near the hamlet of Upstreet.

At the hamlet of Plucks Gutter, the second of the large tributaries enters the main river: the 18.9 miles (30.4 km) long Little Stour, which begins life as a spring stream in Bekesbourne. From here on, the river is normally known as the River Stour.

=== River Stour ===
The twin villages in the parish of Stourmouth (West and East) mark the original point where the Stour entered the erstwhile Wantsum Channel, a strait used for hundreds of years until silting and land reclamation turned the sea channel into a large drainage ditch. At this point the third large tributary, the 8.4-mile (13.4 km) Sarre Penn (named locally as the "Fishbourne Stream") enters with the Wantsum Channel.

Here the river turns southwards to the once-thriving port of Sandwich, after which it loops back on itself to the north before entering the Strait of Dover at Pegwell Bay. The Stonar Cut obviates the need for seagoing craft to take the longer route around the loop at Sandwich.

From the tidal limit at Fordwich to the sea, the river is fringed with marshes. Most of them are located on what was the floor of the Wantsum Channel, whilst those to the south lie behind the sand dunes of the Sandwich Flats. These marshes are criss-crossed with drainage ditches. The principal marshes are those of Chislet, within the ancient estuary of the river; Wade, west of Birchington; and Ash Level.

=== Stonar Cut ===
In the mid-18th century, it became necessary to alleviate the problem of flooding along the lower course of the Stour. The action of tidal drift of shingle along the coast had resulted in the huge loop at the estuary end of the river, and on 29 November 1774 an act of the Parliament of Great Britain was enacted to bypass the loop at the narrowest end, at Stonar. The works, to become known as the Stonar Cut, made use of an existing sluice to cut across the neck of the loop, and were completed in 1776.

During World War I, huge volumes of both troops and supplies were needed on the Continent and, in the utmost secrecy, a new port was built at Richborough. Landing facilities along the Cut were built, and the East Kent Light Railway was extended to service the port. Nothing now remains of much of those works, and the Cut has been allowed to return to its natural state.

=== Tributaries ===
Tributary	Length	Source	Confluence
East Stour	10.3 miles (16.6 km)	Postling	Ashford
Aylesford Stream	3.4 miles (5.5 km)	Sevington	Ashford
Ruckinge Dyke (Note: Tributaries of the East Stour.)	4.9 miles (7.9 km)	Hamstreet	Willesborough
Whitewater Dyke	3.5 miles (5.6 km)	Shadoxhurst	Ashford
Kennington Stream	1.1 miles (1.8 km)	Kennington	Ashford
Brook Stream (Note: Also known as Spiders Castle Dyke.)	3.8 miles (6.1 km)	Brook	Ashford
Kennington Stream (Note: Also known as Pen Lee.)	1.4 miles (2.3 km)	Kennington	Ashford
Little Stour	9 miles (14 km)	Bekesbourne	Plucks Gutter
Nailbourne (Note: The upper reaches of the Little Stour; some sections dry much of the time.)	9 miles (14 km)	Lyminge	Bekesbourne
River Wingham (Note: Tributary of the Little Stour.)	5 miles (8.0 km)	Ash (near Sandwich)	Wickhambreaux
River Wantsum	6.7 miles (10.8 km)	Reculver	Stourmouth
Sarre Penn	8.4 miles (13.5 km)	Dunkirk	Sarre
North Stream, Chislet (Note: Flows into River Wantsum.)	5.4 miles (8.7 km)	Herne	Reculver
North and South Streams	6.1 miles (9.8 km)	Hacklinge area	Sandwich

== History ==
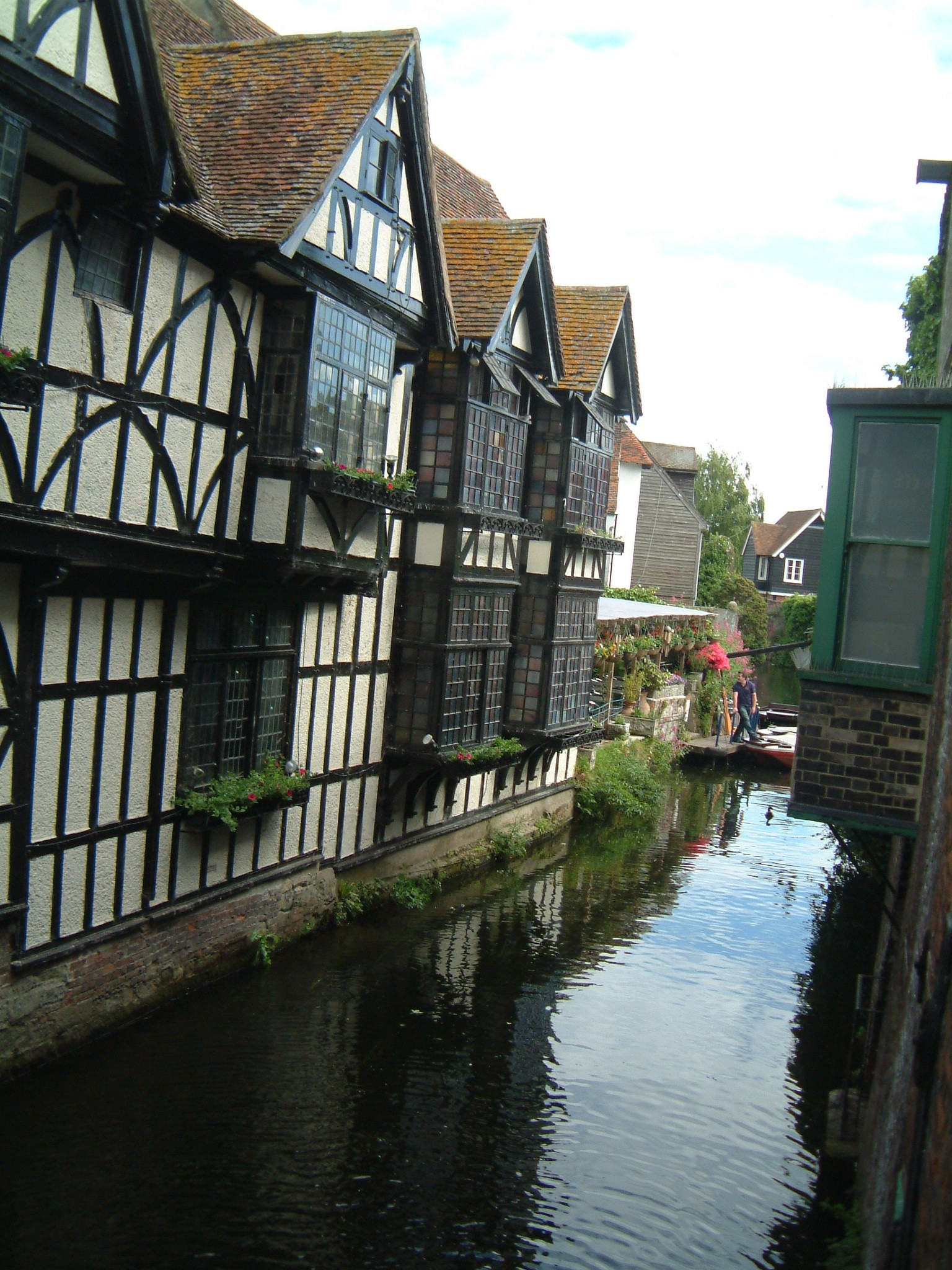
A branch of the Great Stour in Canterbury city centre

In Roman and medieval times, the river was an important highway, connecting Canterbury with the Continent. Fordwich became important to shipping after the silting up of the southern entrance to the English Channel.

In 1831 Joseph Priestley wrote his Historical Account of the Navigable Rivers, Canals and Railways. In it he described in one section the "Canterbury Navigation, or River Stour". He includes an account of its course and the improvements being carried out at that time to assist navigation, and details of new port facilities.

== Economy ==
=== Water mills ===
Man has used the River Stour and its tributaries for centuries as a source of power. Many different processes were performed by the use of water power:- Corn milling, fulling, paper making and electricity generation. Many of the mills survive today as house conversions, with two of them still working commercially.

=== Communications ===
Both roads and railways make use of the river. The Watling Street link to Richborough ("Rutupiae") and their link from Canterbury southwards made use of the North Downs gap. The rail links from Canterbury to the Isle of Thanet and also to Ashford, and the main A28 road follow identical routes.

The 51.5-mile (82.4 km) Stour Valley Walk follows the river for much of its length.

=== Fishing ===
The Great Stour estuary at Plucks Gutter and Grove Ferry is renowned for its coarse fishing, particularly bream stocks.

== Flooding ==
The lower-lying parts of Canterbury have in the past been particularly prone to flooding . The River Stour (Kent) Internal Drainage Board has the responsibility of reducing that risk in the river catchment area

== Environment ==
In 2006, male fish were found with signs of "feminisation" after having been exposed to treated sewage effluent in the river near Ashford. It was found that oestrogen enters the river when the nearby Bybrook sewage works discharges its end product.

In 2009, Southern Water started work on a £4.2 million environmental improvement project at its Lenham treatment works to ensure wastewater is treated to higher standards. New reed beds, containing more than 7,500 reeds, will help clean up to 4.3 million litres of wastewater from more than 3,600 people each day.

In 2017 The Marine Group based in Cardiff begun work with their water injection dredger on the river through Sandwich and Richborough to tackle some of the sediment build up.

== In popular culture ==
Author Russell Hoban repurposes the River Stour where it flows through Canterbury as the "Rivver Sour" in his 1980, post apocalyptic novel Riddley Walker. The River Stour features in the 1944 film A Canterbury Tale.

== See also ==
- Rivers of the United Kingdom
- Rivers of Kent
