= River Wantsum =

Coordinates: 51°23′N 1°14′E

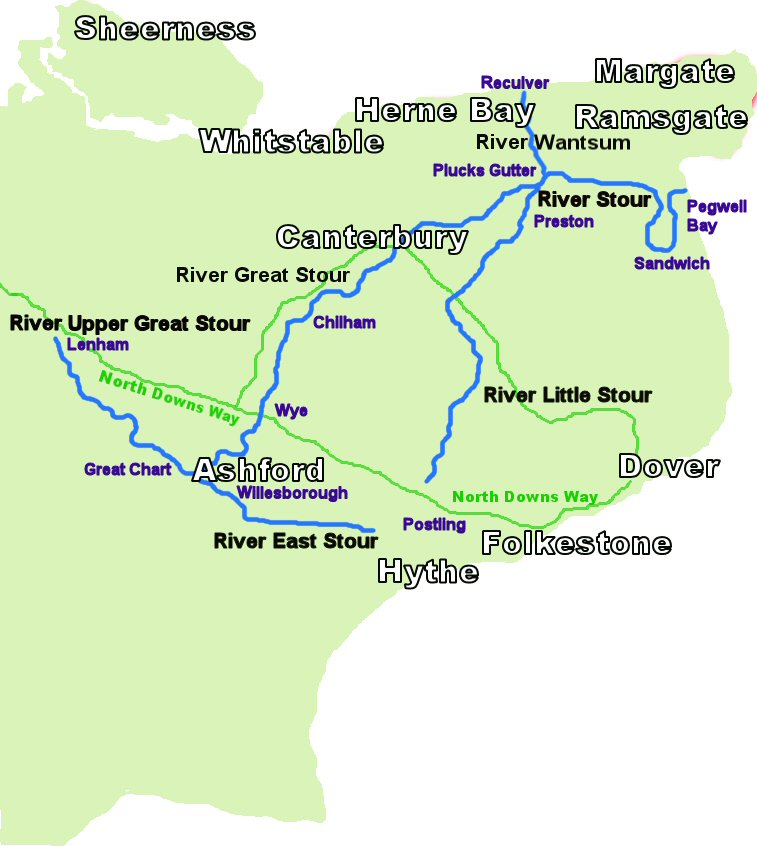
- River Stour and Tributaries

Physical characteristics
- Source
  - location: Reculver
- Mouth
  - location: River Stour

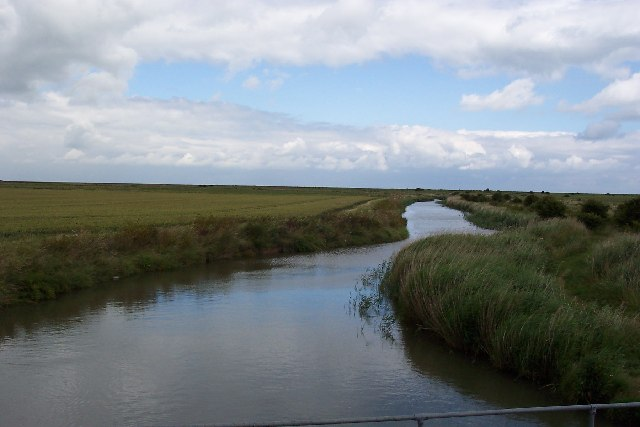
The River Wantsum today. In Roman and medieval times this was a channel a mile and a half wide, linking Reculver and Richborough, capable of taking seagoing boats.

The River Wantsum is a tributary of the River Stour, in Kent, England. It and the River Stour together formed the Wantsum Channel (formerly the Thanet Channel), which separated the Isle of Thanet from the mainland of Kent. Now the River Wantsum is little more than a drainage ditch starting at Reculver, and ending where it joins the Stour.

Bede, in the 8th century, said that the Wantsum – meaning Wantsum Channel – was "about three furlongs broad [660 yards (600 m)], and is fordable only in two places, for both ends run into the sea". In 1414 there was still a ferry crossing the Wantsum at Sarre, but by 1550 Thanet was no longer an island. At Reculver, the Romans built a fort that was about 1 mile (1.6 km) from the sea, whereas Leland, in the early 16th century, described Reculver as being 1/4 mile (400 m) from the sea, and the great storm of 1809 carried away half of the fort. It is postulated that the eroded material was carried along the shore and blocked the northern mouth of the Wantsum.

The River Wantsum now joins the Great Stour from the north as a small tributary, just before the Little Stour enters it from the south to form what is thereafter known simply as the River Stour.
