= Isle of Thanet =

Peninsula in Kent, England

Coordinates: 51°21′N 1°23′E

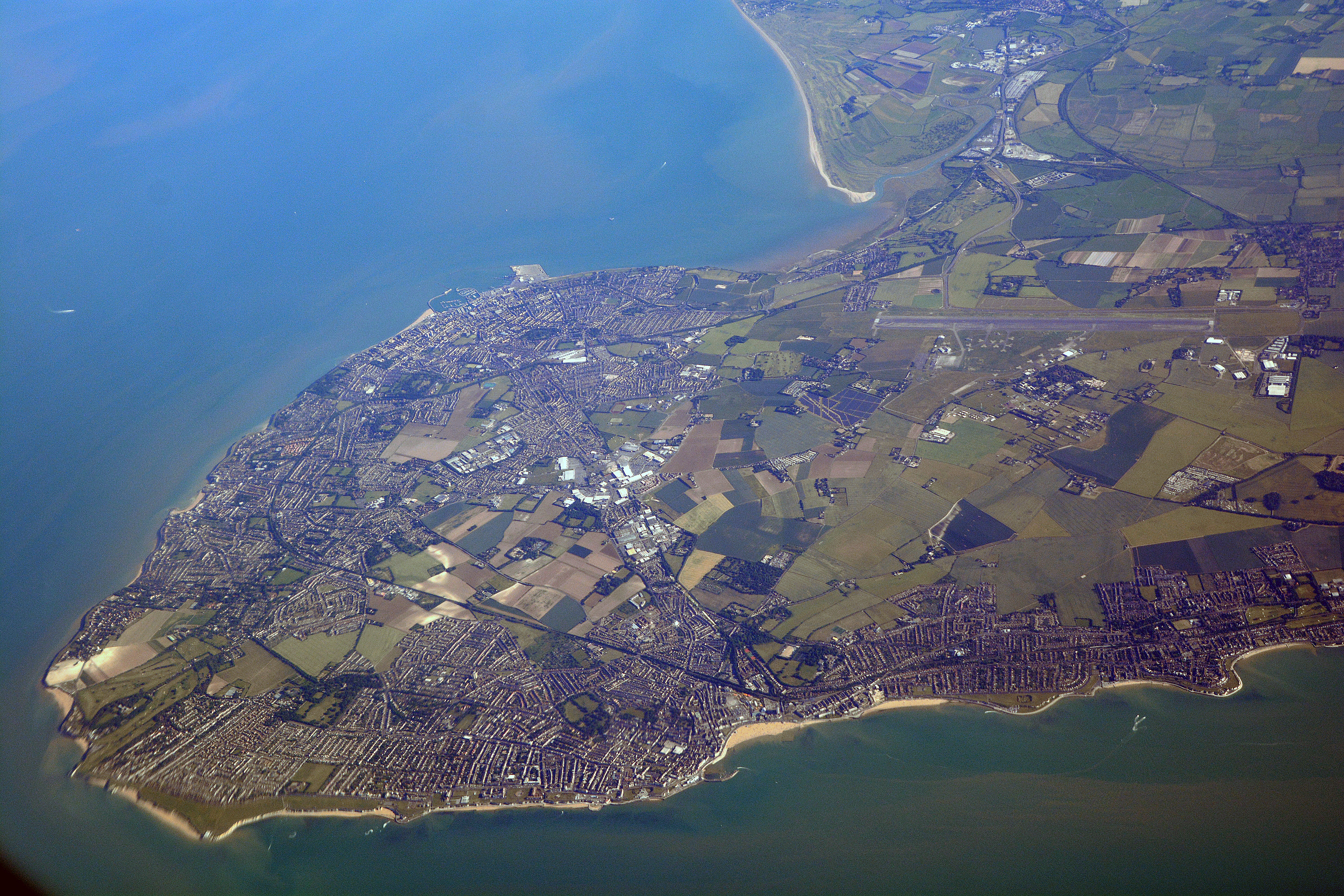
The Isle of Thanet seen from the north

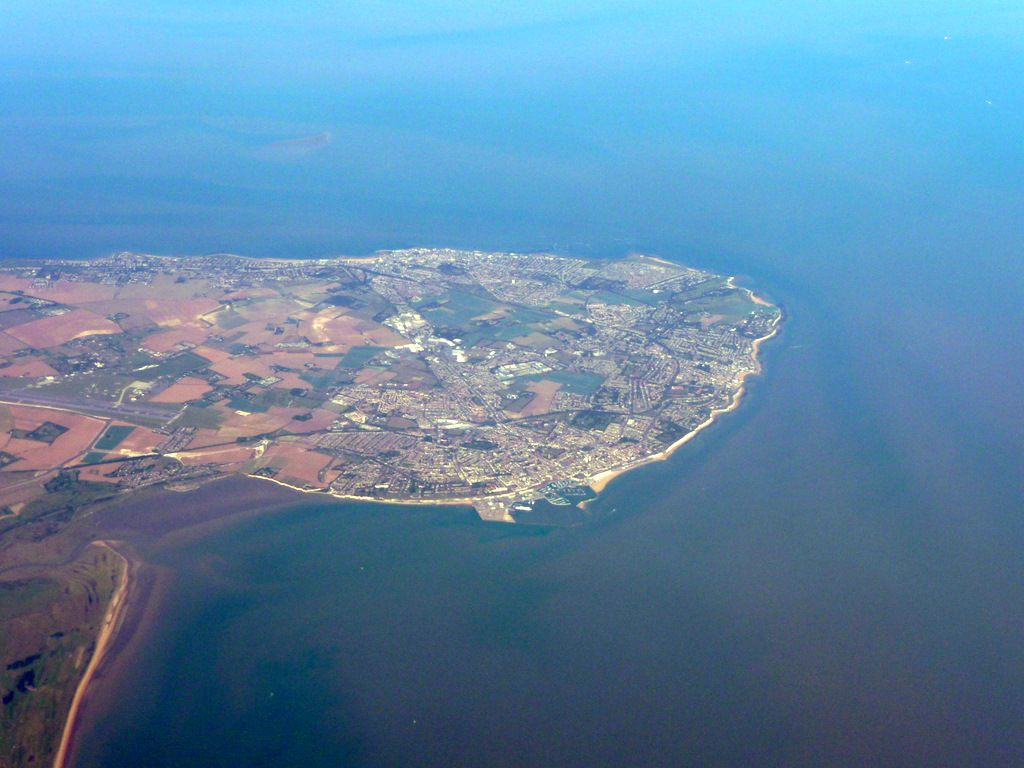
The Isle of Thanet seen from the south

The Isle of Thanet (/ˈθænɪt/) is a peninsula forming the easternmost part of Kent, England. While in the past it was separated from the mainland by the 600-metre-wide (2,000 ft) Wantsum Channel, it is no longer an island.

Archaeological remains testify to its settlement in ancient times. Today, it is a tourist destination, and has an active agricultural base.

== Etymology ==
The island of Thanet is mentioned as Tonetic (c. AD 150; the TON- of this form was misread as TOΛI-, hence it appears as Toliatis in the surviving manuscripts of Ptolemy); Tanat's, Athanatos and Thanatos (in various copies of 3rd C AD, Solinus); Tanatos (AD 731); Tenid in 679 and Tenet (e.g. charters of AD 679, 689 and thereafter); and the Old Welsh forms Tanet and Danet, found in the Historia Brittonum (c. AD 829/30) and Armes Prydein (c. AD 930).

Standard reference works for English place-names (such as Eilert Ekwall's Concise Oxford Dictionary of English Place-Names) state the name Tanet is known to be Brythonic in origin. Commonly the original meaning of Thanet is thought to be "fire" or "bright island" (tân in Modern Welsh and tan in Breton means fire), and this has led to speculation the island was home to an ancient beacon or lighthouse.

Another theory states that Tanet is a common European toponymic creation of Celtic origin, based on the Celtic word *tanno- meaning "holm oak" (compare Breton tann "sort of oak", Cornish glastannen "holm oak") and the Celtic suffix *-etu, to mean a collection of trees. Thanet would mean "place of the holm oaks", such as the Northern French Thenney (Eure, Thaneth ab. 1050); Tennie (Sarthe, Tanida 9th century) or the Italian Tanedo (Lombardy, Tanetum, Tite-Live). A third theory suggests that the origin of the toponym is the name of the Punic goddess Tanit.

The 7th-century Archbishop Isidore of Seville recorded an apocryphal folk-etymology in which the island's name is fancifully connected with the Greek word for death (Thanatos/Θάνατος), stating that Thanet, "an island of the ocean separated from Britain by a narrow channel ... [was] called Tanatos from the death of serpents; for while it has none of its own, soil taken from it to any place whatsoever kills snakes there."

The Historia Brittonum, written in the 9th century, states that "Tanet" was the name used for the island by the legendary Jutes Hengist and Horsa, while its name in Old Welsh was "Ruoi(c)hin"; this name may be translated as "gift" (rhwych in Modern Welsh).

Other names used by Britons were "Ruim" and "Ruochim Inis".

== History ==
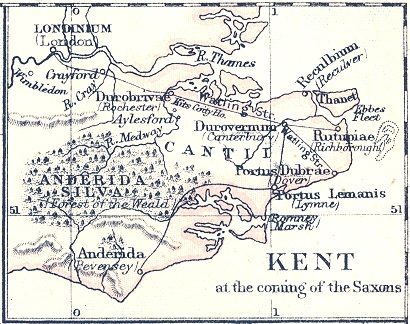
A general map showing late Roman Kent. The Isle of Thanet was then known as Tanatus

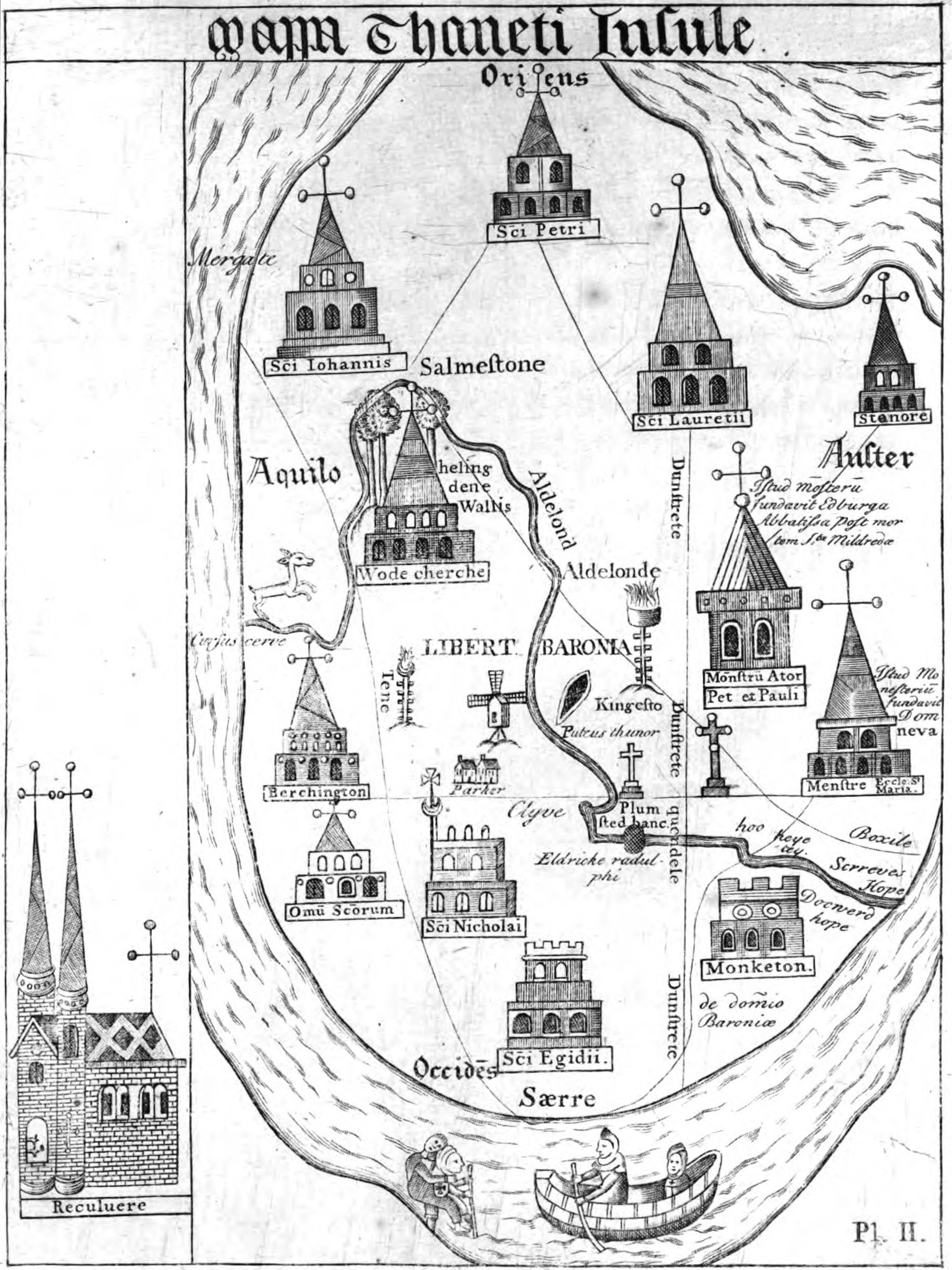
Adaptation of a 15th-century map of the Isle of Thanet, with north on the left: Thomas Elmham, Historia Monasterii S Augustini Cantuariensis

Archaeological evidence shows that the area now known as the Isle of Thanet was one of the major areas of Stone Age settlement. A large hoard of Bronze Age implements has been found at Minster-in-Thanet; and several Iron Age settlements have also come to light.

Julius Caesar made two attempts to invade Britain, in 55 and 54 BC. In 2017 archaeologists from the University of Leicester excavated a Roman fort covering up to 49 acres (20 ha) at Ebbsfleet and dated it to around 55–50 BC. They further linked it to Caesar's invasion of Britain in 54 BC, and suggested that the invading force arrived in nearby Pegwell Bay. Nearly a century later, in 43 AD, Claudius sent four legions to Britain, where the Romans were to remain for the next 400 years. During that time the port of Richborough, on the opposite side of the Wantsum Channel, became one of the chief ports of Roman Britain.

According to the eighth-century ecclesiastical historian Bede, Vortigern, King of the Britons, was under attack from other tribes and called for assistance. Among those who came in 449 were the Jutes Hengist and Horsa; Vortigern is said to have rewarded them with the Isle of Thanet in return for their services. As the following extract from the Historia Brittonum (first written sometime shortly after 833) testifies:

Then came three keels, driven into exile from Germany. In them were the brothers Horsa and Hengest ... Vortigern welcomed them, and handed over to them the island that in their language is called Thanet, in British Ruoihm.

This story, however, is possibly an example of non-historical founding myths, though one constructed with political objectives in mind. It has been noted that Alfred's version of the Saxon Chronicles omitted the death of Horsa. (Note: There are several versions of the Anglo-Saxon Chronicle which can differ in detail explaining also perhaps variation in secondary sources and Saxon spelling) In reality, it appears to have been settled by Jutes (Note: One of the more intriguing pieces of etymological evidence is Sarre, which sat on the southwest shore of the Isle and served as a transit point with mainland Kent. Its name might link the settlers with Saaremaa - the Estonian island involved in the amber trade - and the Saarland in Germany.) under Visigothic authority between 476-517 AD, though they may have been present earlier as Foederati. These were followed by Ingaevones in the sixth century.

Throughout this time the Isle remained an island. The Wantsum Channel allowed ships to sail between the mainland and the island in calm waters. The Saxon Chronicle recounts that in 1052 Earl Godwin after obtaining hostages and provisions from Sandwich sailed through the "Wantsume" towards "Northmuth" and "Lundene". Gradually this silted up, and the last ship sailed through the Channel in 1672.

In 597 Augustine of Canterbury is said, by Bede, to have landed with 40 men at Ebbsfleet, in the parish of Minster-in-Thanet, before founding Britain's second Christian monastery in Canterbury (the first having been founded fifty years earlier by Columba on Eileach an Naoimh in the Hebrides): a cross marks the spot.

Isidore of Seville wrote c.615-30 AD of the Isle of Thanet:

"Tanatos insula Oceani freto Gallico, a Brittania aestuario tenui separata, frumentariis campis et gleba uberi. Dicta autem Tanatos a morte serpentum, quos dum ipsa nesciat, asportata inde terra quoquo gentium vecta sit, angues ilico perimit"

Which translates as:

"Thanet is an island in the Ocean in the Gallic (i.e. English) channel, separated from Britannia by a narrow estuary, with fruitful fields and rich soil. It is named Thanet (Tanatos) from the death of serpents (cf.“death”)"

Following the raids on the Isle of Sheppey commencing in 832, Thanet became a regular target for Viking attacks, its vulnerable coastal monasteries providing convenient targets for the invaders. In 851 and again in 854, the Vikings overwintered in Thanet and continued their raids in spring. In 853 there was a battle in Thanet against the Vikings and both Elcherel, the leader of the men from Kent, and Huda, the leader of the men from Surrey, were killed. (Note: It is not known if mass graves from Saxon times of men, women and children discovered near the North Foreland are related to the 853 battle or other atrocities)

Thanet's monasteries were subsequently used by the Danes as feasting halls or general headquarters.

In 865 the Great Heathen Army encamped in Thanet and was promised by the people of Kent danegeld in exchange for peace. Regardless, the Vikings did not abide by this agreement and proceeded to rampage across eastern Kent. Some time between 978 and 989 (sources differ) raiders entirely destroyed Minster Abbey by arson together with those sheltering in the abbey.

In 969 King Edgar ordered all of Thanet to be plundered.

In 980 Thanet was overrun by the Vikings.

In 1047 those in Thanet successfully resisted a Viking raid of 25 ships that had plundered elsewhere including Sandwich.

To prevent the island being used as a base by the Danes, William the Conqueror laid it to waste after his invasion in 1066.

The 1085 survey of Domesday Book revealed that Thanet had as tenants-in-chief the See of Canterbury and the Abbey of St Augustine, separated into the abbey-manors of St Mildred's (larger) and Monocatune (Monkton, Monks-town). Households of 239 villeins, 71 others and 3 knights were mentioned. The land of these two abbey-manors was separated by a strip of land called a balk and known as Cursus Cerve or St Mildred’s Lynch. It is documented on an early map of Thanet and is associated with the hind symbol used in Thanet and the path of a hind that defined the land assigned to St Mildred's in the Kentish Royal Legend.

By 1334–1335 Thanet had the highest population density in Kent according to King Edward III's lay subsidy rolls. Margate is mentioned in 1349, in a dispute about the land of Westgate Manor. Thanet acted as a granary for Calais, whose governor for Edward III was so assigned to administer. Edward III also required local fortifications to be constructed where boats and ships could land. Documents towards the end of that century refer to turreted walls beneath the cliffs needing maintenance. Coastal erosion has long since destroyed these structures.

Counted households had increased to 532 when reported during the reign of Elizabeth I.

The first Earl of Thanet was created in 1628.

By 1807 the island roads were deemed to be good infrastructure for the time without turnpikes although one was soon established at Ramsgate. The wheat crop was excellent helped with seaweed fertiliser processes.

== Governance ==
Margate was incorporated as a municipal borough in 1857 and Ramsgate in 1884. Broadstairs and St Peter's Urban District and the Isle of Thanet Rural District covered the rest of the island from 1894 until 1974. By 1974, however, all these boroughs and districts had been abolished, and since that year the Isle of Thanet has formed the major part of the District of Thanet.

== Geology ==
The Isle is formed almost wholly of chalk, a soft pure white limestone of Cretaceous age, specifically the Margate Chalk Member (Santonian to Campanian) traditionally referred to simply as the 'Margate Chalk', and sometimes as the ‘Margate Member’. It is a sub-division of the Newhaven Chalk Formation. Beneath this and outcropping around the margins of the Isle is the Seaford Chalk Formation which contains relatively more flint nodules and seams. It has also been referred to as the ‘Broadstairs Member’. The Seaford Chalk is of Coniacian to Santonian age whilst the Margate Chalk is of Santonian to Campanian age. Both were traditionally referred to the ‘Upper Chalk’ but are now classed as parts of the ‘White Chalk Subgroup’ as part of the broader Chalk Group.

Overlying the chalk both within the Wantsum Channel and in patches on the surface of the Isle itself are the 100 m (330 ft) thick sands, silts and clays of the Palaeogene age Thanet Formation (formerly the Thanet Beds). The area gives its name to the internationally recognised Thanetian, descriptive of rocks of this particular part of the Palaeocene throughout the world. Brickearth head deposits lie within many of the shallow chalk valleys and across some areas of flatter ground within the Isle.

== Geography ==
The Isle of Thanet formed when sea levels rose after the last glacial period, around 5000 BC. The North Sea encroached on the land which is now the estuary of the River Thames, and southwards to reach the higher land of the North Downs, leaving behind an island composed of chalk in its wake. Eventually the sea broke through river valleys in the North Downs to the south (Middle Chalk) and finally today's English Channel was opened up. The proto-River Stour then formed part of the intervening water, with a new tributary, the River Wantsum, completing it; it became known as the Wantsum Channel.

The Wantsum Channel gradually narrowed as pebble beaches built up at the southern end of the strait, blocking silt coming down the Stour. There was also previously a stream called the Nethergong on the western side that had its outlet at Northmouth (Yenlade) about 1.8 km (1.1 mi) to the east of Reculver. Bede, in the 8th century, said that the Channel was then three furlongs wide (660 yards (600 m)). A map of 1414 showed a ferry crossing at Sarre. The first wooden bridge over the channel was built there in reign of Henry the Seventh. (Note: A private act of the English Parliament enabling the inhabitants of Sarre to build a bridge was passed in the time of Henry VII [22 Aug 1485 - 21 Aug 1486] Endorsed: 'Billa de Thaneto' but the time the bridge was actually built is not recorded so date as in article was removed as its rare for something to be built before funded.) Until the mid 18th century there was a ferry between Sandwich and the island; in 1755 a wooden drawbridge was built, and the ferry was closed.

Today the Isle is an island no longer and the erstwhile channel is now flat marshland criss-crossed by drainage ditches. Meanwhile, the exposed chalk cliffs are gradually being worn down by the sea, particularly at the North Foreland. Much else of the coast is a built-up area. The Wantsum area is still liable to flooding: during the North Sea flood of 1953 Thanet was cut off for a few days, but the sea defences have been strengthened since then.

The soil and equable climate of the Isle have always encouraged arable farming.

"... a garden indeed, a county of corn but the labourers' houses all along, beggarly in the extreme. The people dirty, poor-looking, but particularly dirty."

— William Cobbett in 1823 when he rode to the Island

Today there are still farms inland, but the coast is nearly all covered in settlements, most of which have come into being in the 19th and 20th centuries.

As the popularity of the seaside resort grew, so did that of the Isle of Thanet. At first the holidaymakers came by boat from London; after the coming of the railways in the mid-1840s, that became the preferred mode of transport. The population grew, as the following population statistics show:

Place	Population in 1801	Population in 1861
Ramsgate & St Lawrence	4,200	15,100
Margate	4,800	10,000
Broadstairs & St Peter's	1,600	2,900

== Landmarks ==
The principal landmarks on the Isle are the North Foreland, and all the bays around the coastline, the principal ones of which are Minnis Bay, Palm Bay, Botany Bay, Joss Bay, and Pegwell Bay: the latter being part of the estuary of the River Stour. In 2007, seven of those beaches met stringent quality standards and were awarded as Blue Flag beaches: Minnis Bay, Botany Bay (Broadstairs), Margate Main Sands, St Mildreds Bay (Westgate), Stone Bay (Broadstairs), West Bay (Westgate), and Westbrook Bay. In 2008, this had risen to 10 beaches.

== Transport ==
The rail connections are via the Chatham Main Line through Margate to Ramsgate, and the Ashford to Ramsgate (via Canterbury West) Line. A high-speed rail link from London to Thanet began in December 2009, and forms part of the UK's first true high-speed commuter service, according to the South Eastern Railway Company. The Thanet Loop bus service connects Margate, Ramsgate, and Broadstairs. Main road links are the A28, which brings traffic from Canterbury and Ashford; and the A299, north coast route. The Thanet Coastal Path skirts the coast.

There is an airport at Manston, formerly RAF Manston, but since renamed by its commercial operators as Manston Airport. The airport is no longer in operation.

Ferry services (predominantly freight and car with passengers) were operated by Transeuropa Ferries to Continental Europe from the Port of Ramsgate but ceased in 2013.

A tramway was once operated by the Isle of Thanet Electric Tramways and Lighting Company from Westbrook to Ramsgate from 1901 to 1937. The tramway had a narrow gauge of 3 ft 6 in (1,067 mm).

== Media ==
There are two local weekly newspapers providing news on the Thanet district area. Isle Of Thanet KM Extra is a free newspaper, while Isle of Thanet Gazette is paid-for. Isle Of Thanet KM Extra is owned by the KM Group, Isle of Thanet Gazette is owned by Trinity Mirror. KMFM Thanet is a radio station on frequency 107.2FM, owned by the KM Group. Community radio station Academy FM (Thanet) launched in 2010 on 107.8FM.

In February 2017, The Isle of Thanet News – covering news across the whole of the Isle of Thanet, was started.

== Cultural references ==
- The Isle of Thanet is mentioned in the 1977 Ian Dury song "Billericay Dickie": "I'd rendezvous with Janet, quite near the Isle of Thanet, she looked more like a gannet, she wasn't half a prannet".
- It is also mentioned in the 2002 song "She's in Broadstairs" by Half Man Half Biscuit on their album Cammell Laird Social Club: "I'm on another planet, She's on the Isle of Thanet".
- The 2021 novel Dreamland by Rosa Rankin-Gee is mostly set on the Isle of Thanet.
- In the movie Kaamelott: The First Chapter, the Saxon Horsa (played by Sting) asks for the island of Thanet in exchange for his services in tracking down king Arthur and his knights. The last scene of the movie takes place in the castle of Thanet.

== Bibliography ==
- Jessup, Frank W. (1966). Kent History Illustrated. Kent County Council.
- Ekwall, E. (2006) [1960], The Concise Oxford Dictionary of English Place-Names (4th ed.), Oxford University Press, ISBN 978-0-19-869103-7
- Glover, J. (1976), The Place Names of Kent, Batsford, ISBN 978-0-7134-3069-1
- Mills, A.D. (1998), A Dictionary of English Place-Names (2nd ed.), Oxford University Press, ISBN 978-0-19-280074-9
- Morris, J. (1980), Nennius: British History and the Welsh Annals, Phillimore, ISBN 0-85033-297-4
- Vennemann, Theo (2012), "The name of the Isle of Thanet", in Hanna, Patrizia Noel Aziz (ed.), Germania Semitica (1 ed.), De Gruyter, pp. 391–422, doi:10.1515/9783110301090.391, ISBN 978-3-11-030109-0, JSTOR j.ctvbkk16h.25
- Brayley, E.W. (1817). Delineations Historical and Topographical, of the Isle of Thanet and the Cinque Ports. Vol. 1. London, England: Sherwood, Neely, and Jones. pp. 1–137.
- Hasted, Edward (1799). The History and Topographical Survey of the County of Kent Volume IV. Canterbury: Simmons and Kirkby.
- Wright, Christopher (1975). Kent through the years. Batsford. pp. 1–72. ISBN 0-7134-2881-3.
- De Beaurepaire, François (1981). "Preface". Les Noms des communes et anciennes paroisses de l'Eure (in French). Picard. pp. 1–224. ISBN 2708400673.
- Ingram, James Henry (2017) [1823]. The Saxon chronicle, with an English Translation and Notes, Critical and Explanatory. London: Longman, Hurst, Rees, Orme, and Brown, Paternoster-Row. pp. 1–463. ISBN 116581420X.
- Lee Over, Kristen (2005). Kingship, conquest, and patria : literary and cultural identities in medieval French and Welsh Arthurian romance. Routledge. pp. 1–244. ISBN 978-0-415-97271-0.
- Ayto, John; Crofton, Ian (2005). Brewer's Britain & Ireland: The History, Culture, Folklore and Etymology of 7500 Places in These Islands. Weidenfeld & Nicolson. pp. 1–1300. ISBN 030435385X.
- Frassetto, Michael (2003). Encyclopedia of Barbarian Europe: Society in Transformation. Santa Barbara, CA: ABC-CLIO. pp. 1–464. ISBN 978-1-57607-263-9.
- Bachrach, Bernard S. (1972). Merovingian Military Organization, 481-751. Minneapolis: University of Minnesota Press. pp. 1–164. ISBN 978-0816606214.
- Werthmann-Carroll, Indra (2020). The Past in the Past: The Reuse of Roman Objects in Early Anglo-Saxon Society c. AD 400 – c. 700 PhD thesis (Thesis). Durham, England: Durham University.
- Barney, Stephen A.; Lewis, W. J.; Beach, J. A.; Berghof, Oliver, eds. (2006). The Etymologies of Isidore of Seville. Translated by Barney, Stephen A.; Lewis, W. J.; Beach, J. A. Cambridge: Cambridge University Press. ISBN 978-0-521-83749-1.
- Scott-Robertson, W. (1878). "Archaeological Notes on Thanet" (PDF). Archaeologia Cantiana. 12: 329–419.
