= Wickhambreaux =

Village in Kent, England

Coordinates: 51.2844°N 1.1836°E

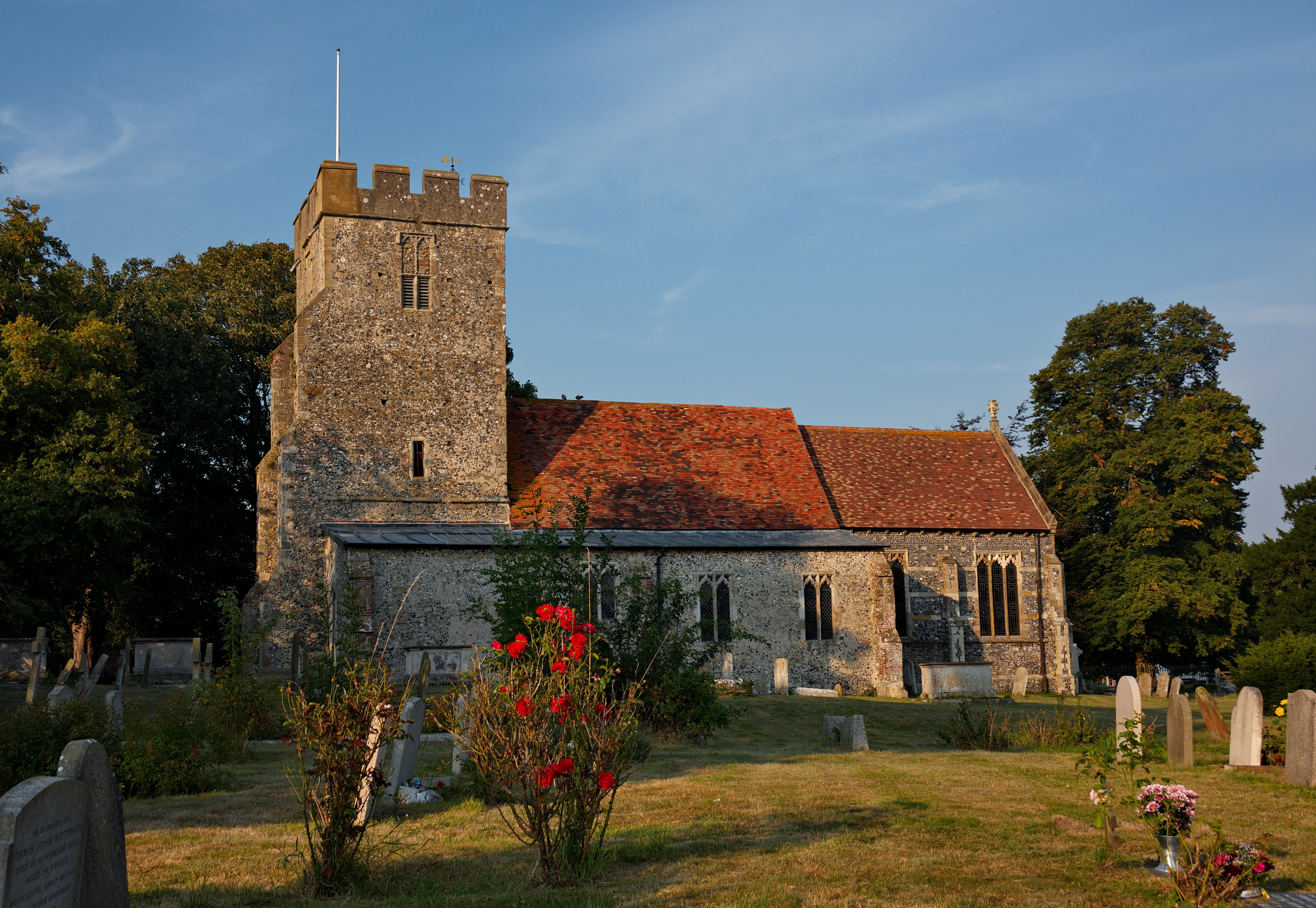
- St Andrew's Church, Wickhambreaux

- Location within Kent
- Area: 11.32 km^{2} (4.37 sq mi)
- Population: 485 (Civil Parish 2011)
  - Density: 43/km^{2} (110/sq mi)
- OS grid reference: TR217583
- Civil parish: Wickhambreaux
- District: City of Canterbury
- Shire county: Kent
- Region: South East
- Country: England
- Sovereign state: United Kingdom
- Post town: Canterbury
- Postcode district: CT3
- Dialling code: 01227
- Police: Kent
- Fire: Kent
- Ambulance: South East Coast
- UK Parliament: Canterbury

Wickhambreaux (/ˈwɪkəmbruː/ WIK-əm-brew) is a village and civil parish in the Canterbury district, in the county of Kent, England. The village is just off the A257 Sandwich Road, four miles east of the city of Canterbury. Since Roman times the village has had connections to the Church and the Crown, including being owned by Joan of Kent in the 14th century. The 13th-century parish church of St Andrew stands around a medieval village green along with other historic buildings.

The village is in the south of its parish, which extends northwards to the River Great Stour. Other settlements in the parish are Stodmarsh and the hamlet of Grove, on the road to Grove Ferry. A bridge at Grove Ferry, on the parish boundary, crosses the Great Stour, and provides access to Upstreet in Chislet civil parish. The bridge replaced the ferry in 1962 or 1963. Grove Ferry and Upstreet railway station was on the north bank of the river, and thus outside the parish, until it closed in 1966.

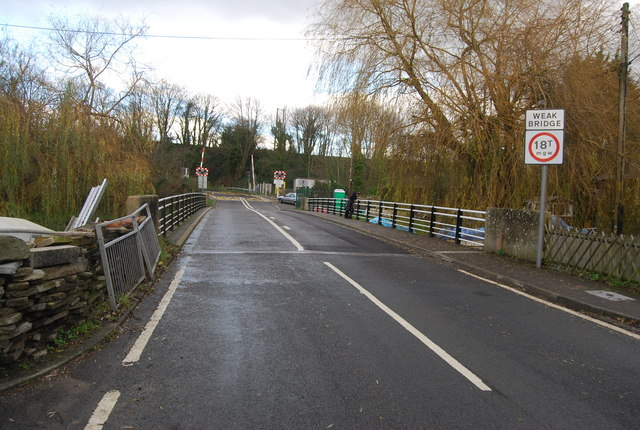
Bridge across the Great Stour at Grove Ferry, looking north over the parish boundary, with level crossing at the far end

== History ==
Wickhambreaux has a recorded history with connections to the Church and Crown dating back to Roman times. It is first mentioned in 948 when King Eadred granted land to a religious woman, however, Wickhambreaux settlement predates this to at least Roman times as it is on the northwest side of the Roman Road. Wickhambreaux village still retains its medieval pattern with the Church, manor house, rectory, inn and mill encircling the green.

Wickhambreaux manor was part of the extensive estates owned by Joan Countess of Kent, wife of Edward, the Black Prince (buried in nearby Canterbury Cathedral) and mother of King Richard II.

Joan was very much a power behind the throne and was seemingly well-loved for her influence over the young king. It is said that when she returned to London from a pilgrimage to Canterbury in 1381, and found her way barred by Wat Tyler and his rebels on Blackheath, the mob not only let her through unharmed, but saluted her with kisses and provided an escort for her for the rest of her journey.

In the Domesday Book of 1086 the village is referred to as Wicheham. The derivation appears to be Anglo Saxon and is formed from Wich (Wich town), meaning coastal trading settlement and Ham, meaning homestead or settlement. Although this is surprising today, in Roman Britain and Anglo-Saxon England the village was near the mouth of the Little Stour or Lesser Stour, where it entered the Wantsum Channel. This explains the fisheries and salt pans mentioned in the Domesday Book, and the river was at that time easily navigable for ships of the time. Wickhambreaux is the location of the site where one of the first Roman roads in Britain crossed the Little Stour en route from, where the Romans first landed in Britain, Richborough Castle to Canterbury.

An alternative spelling may be Wykham Brewes as seen in 1418, the home of a weaver called John Bourneman. Other places mentioned in the record are Goodneston by Wyngham, Mungeham and Elmestone.

== Religion ==
To the northwest of the mill on a small rise sits the flint and stone church of St Andrew (Grade I) and its graveyard. This simple perpendicular church was constructed during the 13th century, with early 16th-century additions. Its plan comprises a chancel with an organ chamber to the north, and a three-bay nave with tie-beam roof. The church was restored in 1868. Wickhambreaux was one of the early minsters founded in Kent before 700. The Art Nouveau stained glass east window of the Annunciation dates from 1896. The donor was "Count" James Francis Gallatin and this was the first commission in Europe given to American glassworkers. The window is dedicated to Gallatin's mother Mrs Harriette Duer de Gallatin, who had been married to Albert Gallatin Jr. It was designed by Arild Rosenkrantz and manufactured in John La Farge's New York Studio. James Francis Gallatin was the great grandson of Albert Gallatin, the longest serving United States Secretary of the Treasury and member of Thomas Jefferson's cabinet. James Francis Gallatin edited the purported diary of his grandfather James Gallatin, who had acted as private secretary to Albert Gallatin at the conclusion of the War of 1812. It was published in 1914 as 'A Great Peace Maker: The Diary of James Gallatin'. This has subsequently been assessed to be a fabrication committed by James Francis Gallatin. In an article in The American Historical Review (LXII July 1957 pp 878–885) Raymond Walters Jr. stated, “. . . I reached the conclusion that the diary is a complete fraud". James Francis styled himself Count Gallatin, though his right to the title was disputed, but he was known to his own family as 'bad Jimmy'. Walters notes that no manuscript for the diary has survived or was ever known to have been seen by anybody other than Jimmy. The gay writer J. R. Ackerley, in his posthumously published autobiography, speculated that his father had a homosexual relationship with 'Count' James Francis de Gallatin. James Francis Gallatin was declared bankrupt 14 times in-between 1879 and 1889, and died in 1915 with £128 to his name.

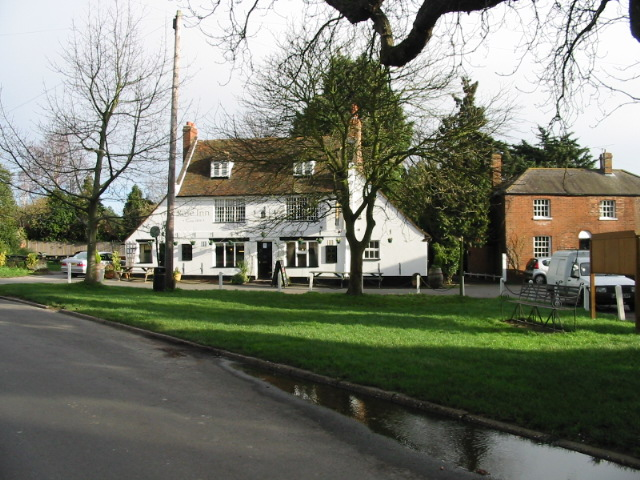
The Rose Inn

== Culture ==
Historically the village was a farming community but, as with so many rural villages, many of the residents work in local towns. Although only small in population, around 500, it is a busy village with its church activities, Produce Association, competitive cricket club and many other similar interests. Village shops closed over the years but despite the small population the primary school still occupies its original historic building dating back to 1869.

The surrounding agricultural land produces some of Kent's fruit as well as cereal and vegetable crops.

== Landmarks ==
The historic village of Wickhambreaux contains a harmonious collection of substantial distinctive properties clustered around the village green, including the former watermill on the banks of the Little Stour. The most picturesque corner is to the south-east with the Old Stone House and Wickham Mill adjoining the river.

Wickham Mill (Grade II listed) previously a corn mill dominates the entrance into Wickhambreaux from Littlebourne and its four-storey, with attics, white weather boarded structure is a local landmark. Of particular note is the retention of the overshot waterwheel. Opposite the mill is the Old Stone House/former Post Office (Grade II*). Beyond the mill, where the road crosses the Little Stour via a small bridge with white painted wooden railings, the village green is reached. The green is very much the centre of the village, with the church, large houses and the Rose Inn public house fronting it.

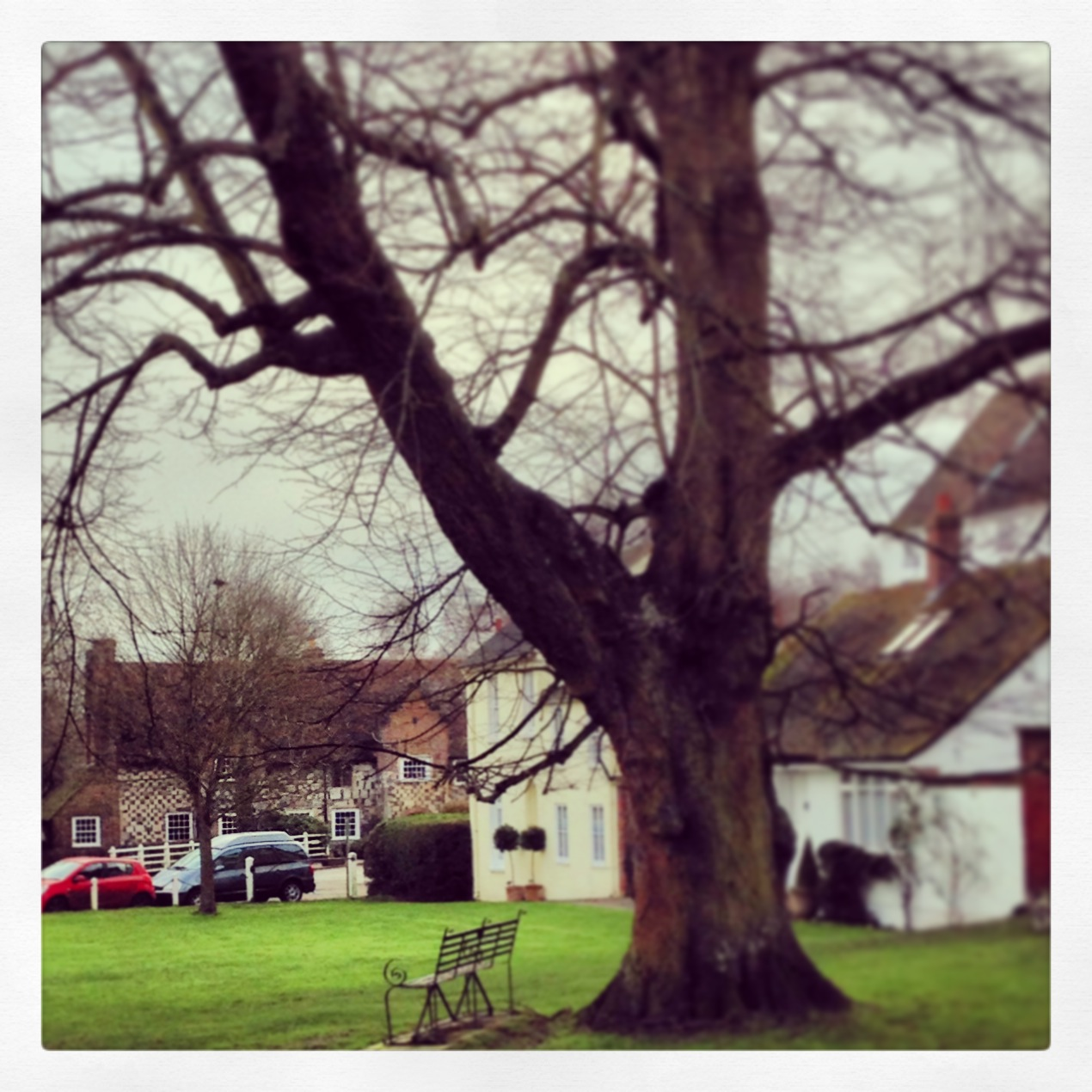
The Old Stone House

Wickhambreaux Court (Grade II) sits on a small slope above the green and its Regency buff brick 1700s façade with green shutters is the dominant built feature from the green. This re-facing masks an older building which could well be medieval in origins and was likely undertaken on the instruction of the then owner of the Manor Sir Thomas Palmer, 4th Baronet, of Wingham. The house featured in the 1944 film A Canterbury Tale. Behind Wickhambreaux Court is the Wickham Court Oast, which is all that remains of a farm.

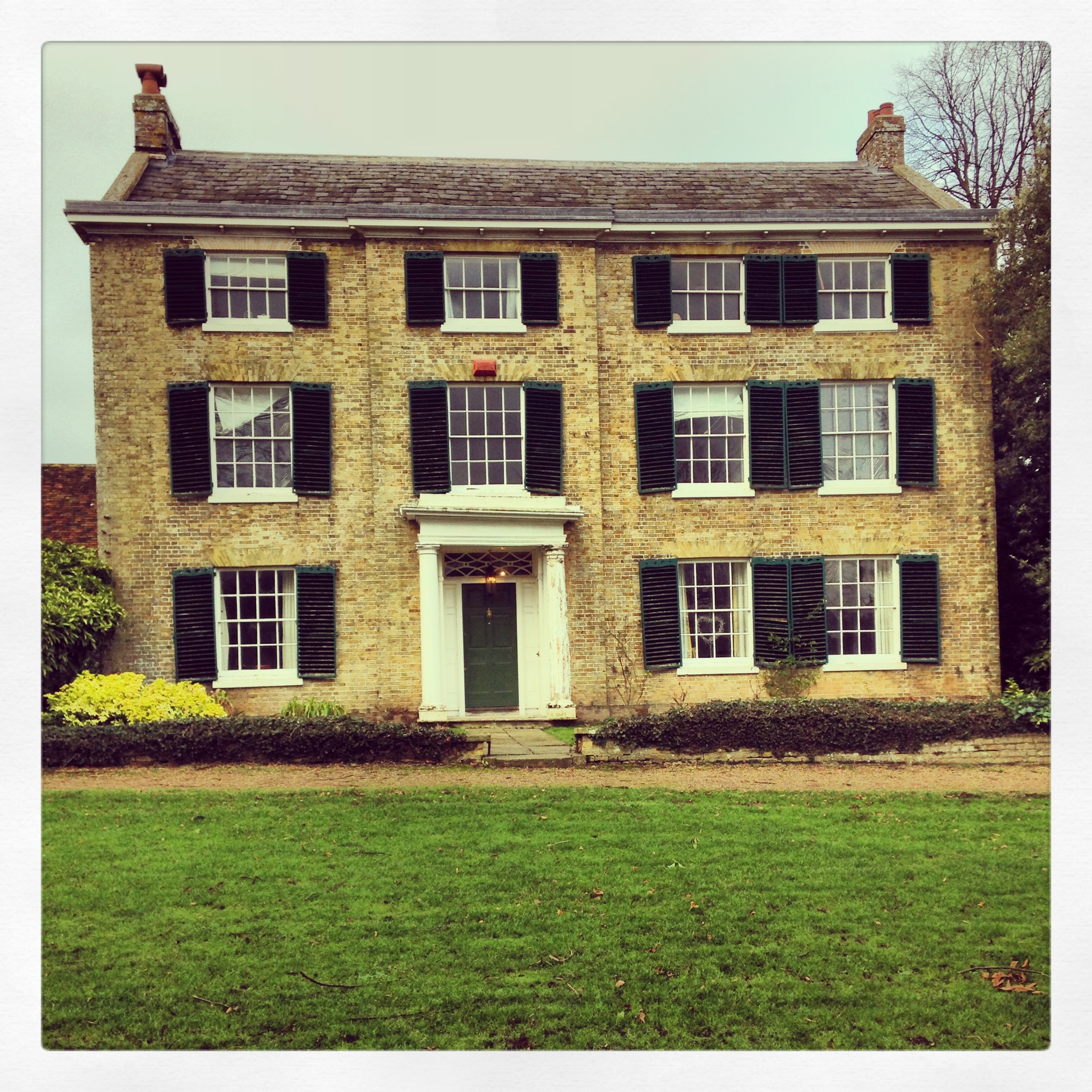
Wickham Court

Across the green from Wickhambreaux Court sits Old Willow Farmhouse (Grade II) a two-storey 18th century house of red brick which was restored and rendered in the first half of the 19th century. The building sits prettily in its grounds next to the Little Stour. The river at this point flows between the Oast Houses and Old Willow Farmhouse and has landscaped banks with willow trees, shrubs and flowers crossed by attractive foot bridges.

The Old Rectory (formerly Wickham House) is Grade II* listed with unmistakable Baroque tendencies. It was built in 1714 by Reverend Alexander Young The Old rectory is two storeys high with attics and a basement. Its construction of red-brown brick with red brick dressings has one of the finest examples of tuck-pointing mortar in the district.

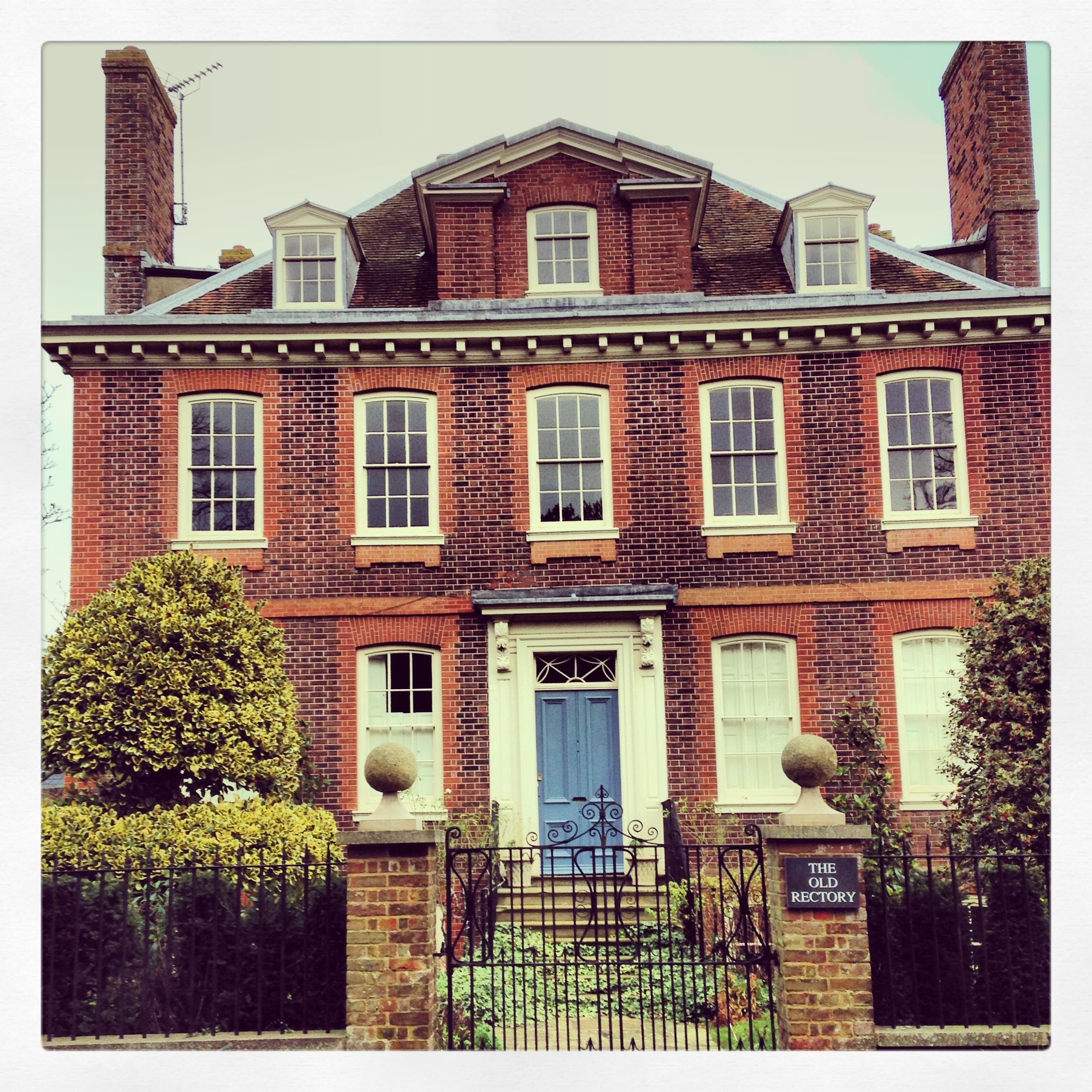
The Old Rectory

To the south of the Old Rectory is the Rose Inn (Grade II). Its two-storey rendered frontage is late 17th early 18th century in appearance. In earlier times travellers used it as a stopping point on their way to Grove where The Stour could be crossed. It remains the busy hub of this community being one of the few businesses left in the village. Adjacent to the Rose Inn is a small terrace of locally listed cottages which, along with the Old Bell House, form the corner and entrance to The Street a narrow road of smaller terraced style houses.

The Old Bell House (Grade II) is a 15th-century timber-framed building, probably a hall-house of two bays. The first floor is close studded with brown roughcast infilling, the ground floor is rebuilt in painted brick. It turns the corner into The Street where it is abutted by Bell Cottage.

Wickhambreaux retains the medieval pattern of development of grander homes around the green and smaller workers' cottages and small businesses in their own separate area. The Street is narrow and lined with closely packed buildings predominantly built up to the road edge. This character area contains 17 listed buildings and 23 locally listed properties. The form, layout and character of this street hark back to a much earlier era. Until 1966 the road still had the central drainage gutter from the Middle Ages and is still locally known as Gutter Street.

The Street would have been the commercial core of the village and many of the building forms and names still reflect this, however, the village shops have closed over the years.

== Wickhambreaux in the Domesday Book ==
"The Bishop of Bayeux held Wicheham in demesne and it was assessed at 4 sulungs. There was land for 11 ploughs, while the demesne had land for 2 ploughs; 36 villans and 32 cottars had 9 ploughs. There was a church and a priest who gave 40 shillings a year. There was a park; 2 mills rendering 50 shillings; 2 salt-pans rendering 32 pence; 3 fisheries rendering 4 shillings; 32 acres of meadow; pasture for 300 sheep and 31 cattle; woodland for 80 pigs.

In the time of King Edward it was worth £25; when it was received by the bishop it was worth £20; by 1086 it was worth £30.

Also belonging to this manor were 3 messages in Canterbury rendering 6 shillings 8 pence.

In addition there belonged to this manor half a sulung of free land which Sigeræd held of Alfred Bigga and then Geoffrey fitzMalleterre held of the Bishop of Bayeux; it was always worth 60 shillings".

By the eleventh century the church and adjacent court farm formed the manorial focus of the medieval settlements.

== Owners of The Manor of Wickhambreaux ==
In the Domesday Book Odo, Earl of Kent, half brother of William the Conqueror was owner of the Manor. Bishop Odo was imprisoned and subsequently banished to Normandy and the Manor passed to Roger de Condet (Cundi/Cundy) c.1083. On his death in 1141, it was inherited by his son Roger de Cundet, who died in 1201, bequeathing it to his daughter, Agnes de Cundy. Agnes married Walter II de Clifford and thus it passed into the ownership of the de Clifford's. Agnes de Clifford made a bequest before 1222 towards the making of an aisle at St Andrew's Church. It was subsequently owned by Walter III de Clifford. He left one daughter Maud as heiress, a granddaughter of Llywelyn ab Iorwerth, who married firstly William Longespée, 3rd Earl of Salisbury and secondly John Giffard of Brimsfield. William Longespée, 3rd Earl of Salisbury's son Nicholas Longespee is the first recorded rector of Wickhambreaux. It passed from Walter III de Clifford to John de Brewes, via Walter II de Clifford being his step father (having married Margaret/Maud in 1234)

John de Brewes was the younger son of John de Braose. He died in 1275 and the Manor passed to William de Braose, 1st Baron Braose and to his son William de Braose, 2nd Baron Braose, who died in 1326 and his heirs were his daughter Aline and his grandson John de Bohun. Aline, the elder daughter, married John de Mowbray and Richard de Peschale. On William de Braose's death there was contention about who owned the Manor with Hugh le Despencer, 1st Earl of Winchester taking control of it for a period and William's daughter Aline seeking its return. It was clear that William had intended to sell the Manor, but unclear to whom.

In 1326 Edmund of Woodstock, 1st Earl of Kent was in possession of the Manor and in 1330 it passed to his son Edmund, 2nd Earl of Kent and to his brother, John, 3rd Earl of Kent on his death on 27 December 1352, without issue, the estates fell to Joan, 4th Countess of Kent suo jure popularly known as "The Fair Maid of Kent". On her death in 1385 it passed to her son, from her first marriage, Thomas Holland, 2nd Earl of Kent. It remained under the control of the de Holland family till 1408, being owned by Thomas Holland, 1st Duke of Surrey then his son Edmund Holland, 4th Earl of Kent. On his death, with no issue, it passed to Joan, daughter of Eleanor de Holland, husband of Edward Charleton, 5th Baron Cherleton, who married John Grey, 1st Earl of Tankerville and held the manor till 1421. It then passes to John Tiptoft, 1st Baron Tiptoft from his second marriage to Joyce (c. 1404–1446), younger daughter and co-heiress of Edward Charleton, 5th Baron Cherleton by his spouse Eleanor Holand. It was the inherited by his son John Tiptoft, 1st Earl of Worcester in 1443.

In 1470 it passed to Anthony Browne, via his wife Lucy Neville, daughter of John Neville, 1st Marquess of Montagu and grand daughter of John Tiptoft, 1st Baron Tiptoft. In 1506 it was inherited by Anthony Browne (died 1548) and thereafter passed to Anthony Browne, 1st Viscount Montagu from 1548 to 1592, when it was inherited by his son Sir George Browne of Wickhambreaux and on his death in 1615 to his son of the same name. By 1656 the grandson second son of Anthony Browne (1552–1592) Stanislaus Browne is recorded as holding the Manor.

The Manor was sold at the end of Charles II reign by Sir George Browne's daughters to Sir Henry Palmer, 3rd Baronet (died 1706). On his death it passed to Sir Thomas Palmer, 4th Baronet, of Wingham, who was described as 'A man of pleasure and very extravagant in all things' and parodied by Alexander Pope thus: "To Palmer's bed no actress comes amiss; He weds the whole Personae Dramatis". Following his death the Manor is under the control of Sir Thomas Palmer's wife Dame Elizabeth Palmer, which resulted in litigation with some Sir Thomas' children. Dame Elizabeth married Thomas Hey, formerly a merchant in Venice.

On her death the Manor passed to Sir Thomas Palmer, 4th Baronet, of Wingham's illegitimate son Herbert's widow Bethia, daughter of Sir Thomas D'Aeth, 1st Baronet (1670–1745). She remarried Colonel John Cosnan, who had served with 45th Regiment of Foot in French and Indian War and following his death in 1773, she remained owner of the Manor till 1789, when it was inherited by the Rev. Thomas Hey, rector of Wickhambreaux, and his heirs, being the eldest son of the last Dame Elizabeth Palmer by her last husband. Thomas Hey married first Ethelreda, eldest daughter and coheir of dean Lynch, by whom he has no surviving children; and secondly, Mrs. Pugett, widow of Mr. Puget, of London. Thomas Hey died in 1807

The Manor then came into the hands of the D'Aeth's, through Herbert Palmer's (illegitimate son of Sir Thomas Palmer, 4th Baronet, of Wingham ) marriage to Bethia daughter of Sir Thomas D'Aeth, 1st Baronet (1670–1745). It remained in the ownership of the D'Aeth's until 1902, when it was sold to Marquess Conyngham who held the Manor till 1929.

== Village life ==
The village green is bordered by a tall white clapboard mill with working water wheel, the parish church, several houses and a public house, The Rose Inn. There was once another public house, 'The Hooden Horse', in The Street adjoining the village green, known until the 1950s as 'The Swan', this closed in 1979.

The Kentish practice of hoodening in the village was carried out by labourers who went from door to door, collecting funds, sometimes aggressively, for their Christmas festivities. The hoodening tradition has since ended, but today is immortalised in some of the routines performed by Morris dancers.

Wickhambreaux has a small Church of England primary school.

The Parish Church is that of St Andrew, which is renowned locally for its wall painting and Art Nouveau stained glass. The Parish Priest is Rev. Chris Wilkinson.

The house in the trees on the village green, Wickhambreaux Court, was used as the 'Glueman's' house in Powell and Pressburger's wartime classic film A Canterbury Tale. The film also included shots of Wickham Mill, and featured the boys battle on the river.

== Notable residents ==
- Christine McVie (1943-2022), member of Fleetwood Mac
- Nicholas Bateman, a contestant in the first series of the UK reality television show Big Brother
- Squadron Leader David Maltby DSO DFC, of 617 Dambusters Squadron is buried in the churchyard
