= Wingham River =

River Wingham
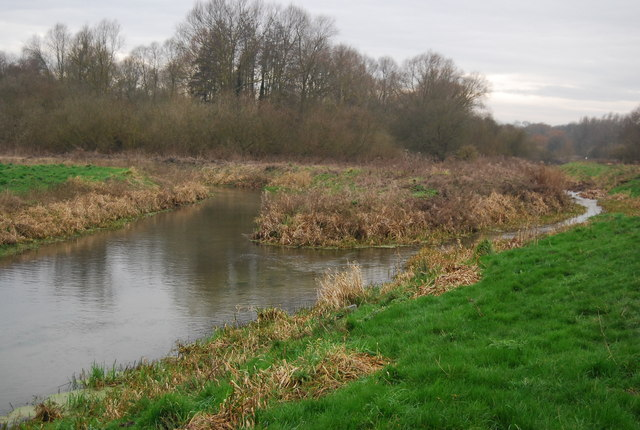

Location
- Country: England

Physical characteristics
- Source
  - location: near Ash.
  - elevation: 12 m (39 ft)
- Mouth
  - location: Little Stour at Wingham, Kent.
  - coordinates: 51°17′25″N 1°12′10″E
  - elevation: 4 m (13 ft)
- Length: 8 km (5.0 mi)

The River Wingham is a tributary of the Little Stour in Kent, England.

The river runs from its source near Ash, west, through Wingham to the Little Stour.
