= Brook Stream =

River in Kent, England

Physical characteristics
- Source
  - location: Brook; TR 03549 48549
  - coordinates: 51°11′58″N 0°54′50″E
- Mouth
  - location: Great Stour north of Ashford, Kent
- Length: 6.1 km (3.8 mi)

Brook Stream (also known as Spiders Castle Dyke) is a tributary of the Great Stour river in Ashford, Kent, England.

The water can appear bright orange at times due to iron deposits.

The stream runs for approximately 6.1 kilometres from its source near Brook, flowing northwest to join the Great Stour.
