= Listed buildings in Kennington, Kent =

Historic structures in Kent, England

Kennington is a village and civil parish in the Borough of Ashford of Kent, England. It contains 46 grade II listed buildings that are recorded in the National Heritage List for England.

This list is based on the information retrieved online from Historic England

== Key ==
Grade	Criteria
I	Buildings that are of exceptional interest
II*	Particularly important buildings of more than special interest
II	Buildings that are of special interest

== Listing ==
Name	Grade	Location	Type	Completed (Note: The date given is the date used by Historic England as significant for the initial building or that of an important part in the structure's description.)	Date designated	Grid ref. (Note: The grid reference is based on the British national grid reference system, sometimes known as OSGB36, used by the Ordnance Survey.) Geo-coordinates	Notes	Entry number (Note: The "List Entry Number" is a unique number assigned to each listed building and scheduled monument by Historic England.)	Image	Wikidata
Apple Cottage	II	Ball Lane			4 June 1976	TR0267245388; 51°10′19″N 0°53′52″E		1362817	Upload Photo	Q26644683
Culvers	II	Ball Lane			4 June 1976	TR0247945312; 51°10′16″N 0°53′42″E		1071137	Upload Photo	Q26326071
Glovers	II	Ball Lane			24 September 1951	TR0228945325; 51°10′17″N 0°53′32″E		1071136	Upload Photo	Q26326069
Hall Cottage	II	Ball Lane			4 June 1976	TR0295145386; 51°10′18″N 0°54′07″E		1362818	Upload Photo	Q26644684
Home Farmhouse	II	Ball Lane			4 June 1976	TR0252745324; 51°10′17″N 0°53′45″E		1071138	Upload Photo	Q26326074
Oasthouse to East of Ulley Farmhouse	II	Ball Lane			4 June 1976	TR0232345668; 51°10′28″N 0°53′35″E		1362815	Upload Photo	Q26644681
Sumach Cottage	II	Ball Lane			4 June 1976	TR0244445309; 51°10′16″N 0°53′40″E		1362816	Upload Photo	Q26644682
The Old School Bungalow	II	Ball Lane			4 June 1976	TR0268445390; 51°10′19″N 0°53′53″E		1071139	Upload Photo	Q26326077
Ulley Farmhouse	II	Ball Lane			24 September 1951	TR0229145673; 51°10′28″N 0°53′33″E		1071135	Upload Photo	Q26326067
Bockhanger Farmhouse	II	Bockhanger Lane			24 September 1951	TR0127544997; 51°10′08″N 0°52′40″E		1071084	Upload Photo	Q26325962
Bybrook	II	Canterbury Road			24 September 1951	TR0150643837; 51°09′30″N 0°52′49″E		1362840	Upload Photo	Q26644703
Bybrook Coach House and 1 Bybrook Cottages	II	Canterbury Road, TN24 9QA			4 June 1976	TR0151943803; 51°09′29″N 0°52′50″E		1071105	Upload Photo	Q26326008
Kennington Hall	II	Canterbury Road			24 September 1951	TR0300045684; 51°10′28″N 0°54′10″E		1184267	Upload Photo	Q26479591
Rose Cottage	II	Canterbury Road			4 June 1976	TR0295745438; 51°10′20″N 0°54′07″E		1362841	Upload Photo	Q26644704
Stable to Kennington Hall	II	Canterbury Road			4 June 1976	TR0300145697; 51°10′28″N 0°54′10″E		1071106	Upload Photo	Q26326011
The Bybrook Barn	II	Canterbury Road, TN24 8QQ			11 August 1971	TR0146843809; 51°09′29″N 0°52′47″E		1300231	Upload Photo	Q26587552
The Holiday Inn	II	Canterbury Road, TN24 8QQ			4 June 1976	TR0153543751; 51°09′27″N 0°52′50″E		1071103	Upload Photo	Q26326003
The Holiday Inn	II	Canterbury Road, TN24 8QQ			4 June 1976	TR0152443743; 51°09′27″N 0°52′50″E		1362839	Upload Photo	Q26644702
The Old Mill	II	Canterbury Road, TN25 4DZ			4 June 1976	TR0298045395; 51°10′18″N 0°54′08″E		1071104	Upload Photo	Q26326006
Wall and Gate Piers to East of Kennington Hall	II	Along The Road, Canterbury Road			4 June 1976	TR0303345662; 51°10′27″N 0°54′11″E		1071107	Upload Photo	Q26326013
Churchyard to St Mary's Church	II	Church Road, TN24 9DQ			4 June 1976	TR0223045144; 51°10′11″N 0°53′29″E		1362852	Upload Photo	Q26644715
Elmtree	II	Church Road			4 June 1976	TR0210344913; 51°10′04″N 0°53′22″E		1071110	Upload Photo	Q26326018
The Homestead	II	Church Road			4 June 1976	TR0202544828; 51°10′01″N 0°53′18″E		1071111	Upload Photo	Q26326020
The Old House	II	Church Road			24 September 1951	TR0219145009; 51°10′07″N 0°53′27″E		1184284	Upload Photo	Q26479609
Pilgrim Cottage	II	Lower Vicarage Road			4 June 1976	TR0147145067; 51°10′10″N 0°52′50″E		1071063	Upload Photo	Q26325905
Oak Farm Cottage	II	63, Lower Vicarage Road			4 June 1976	TR0154744946; 51°10′06″N 0°52′53″E		1071064	Upload Photo	Q26325908
Mill Cottage	II	Mill Lane			4 June 1976	TR0309945435; 51°10′19″N 0°54′14″E		1071069	Upload Photo	Q26325928
The Mill House	II	Mill Lane			24 September 1951	TR0306945437; 51°10′20″N 0°54′13″E		1184624	Upload Photo	Q26479954
Water Mill	II	Mill Lane			4 June 1976	TR0306445427; 51°10′19″N 0°54′12″E		1071068	Upload Photo	Q26325925
Barton Cottage	II	The Street			24 September 1951	TR0252044954; 51°10′05″N 0°53′44″E		1184831	Upload Photo	Q26480147
Church of St Mary	II	The Street			24 September 1951	TR0224045162; 51°10′12″N 0°53′30″E		1071054	Upload Photo	Q26325871
Kennington House	II	The Street			24 September 1951	TR0252544872; 51°10′02″N 0°53′44″E		1299951	Upload Photo	Q66477518
Kennington Lodge	II	The Street			24 September 1951	TR0251644884; 51°10′02″N 0°53′43″E		1071049	Upload Photo	Q26325851
Temple House	II	The Street			4 June 1976	TR0225445099; 51°10′10″N 0°53′30″E		1184854	Upload Photo	Q26480165
The Forge	II	The Street			4 June 1976	TR0242544984; 51°10′06″N 0°53′39″E		1071052	Upload Photo	Q26325864
The Grange	II	The Street			4 June 1976	TR0262544883; 51°10′02″N 0°53′49″E		1071050	Upload Photo	Q26325856
Yeoman Cottages	II	The Street			4 June 1976	TR0255644923; 51°10′04″N 0°53′45″E		1071051	Upload Photo	Q26325860
Home Farm	II	51, The Street			4 June 1976	TR0227345027; 51°10′07″N 0°53′31″E		1184825	Upload Photo	Q26480141
Laurel Tree House	II	56, The Street, Kwnnington			4 June 1976	TR0238444995; 51°10′06″N 0°53′37″E		1184838	Upload Photo	Q26480151
58, The Street	II	58, The Street			4 June 1976	TR0237345001; 51°10′06″N 0°53′36″E		1071053	Upload Photo	Q26325868
66, The Street	II	66, The Street			4 June 1976	TR0234345015; 51°10′07″N 0°53′35″E		1362851	Upload Photo	Q26644714
May Tree Cottage	II	Ulley Road			4 June 1976	TR0180945377; 51°10′19″N 0°53′08″E		1184936	Upload Photo	Q26480247
Millers Ley	II	Ulley Road			4 June 1976	TR0191245282; 51°10′16″N 0°53′13″E		1362876	Upload Photo	Q26644739
Old Mill Cottage	II	Ulley Road			4 June 1976	TR0189345305; 51°10′17″N 0°53′12″E		1071018	Upload Photo	Q26325755
Conningbrook Manor	II	Willesborough Road			4 June 1976	TR0307343501; 51°09′17″N 0°54′09″E		1184964	Upload Photo	Q26480275
Spearpoint Cottage	II	Willesborough Road			4 June 1976	TR0257044468; 51°09′49″N 0°53′45″E		1362877	Upload Photo	Q26644740

== See also ==
- Grade I listed buildings in Kent
- Grade II* listed buildings in Kent

== Sources ==
- Newman, John (2012) [1969], Kent: West and the Weald, The Buildings of England, New Haven and London: Yale University Press, ISBN 978-0-300-18509-6
