= Kennington Stream =

Stream in Kent, England

Coordinates: 51°09′25″N 0°53′22″E

Physical characteristics
- Source
  - location: Kennington
- Mouth
  - location: Great Stour
  - elevation: 38 m (125 ft)
- Length: 2.3 km (1.4 mi)

Kennington Stream (or Penlee / Pen Lee) is a tributary of the Great Stour river in Ashford, Kent, England.

The stream runs from its source near Kennington, 2.3 kilometres, past Penlee Point (the junction of the A28 and A251 roads) to the Great Stour, joining adjacent to the M20 motorway.
