= Kennington, Kent =

Suburb of Ashford, Kent, England

Coordinates: 51.1674°N 0.8918°E

Kennington
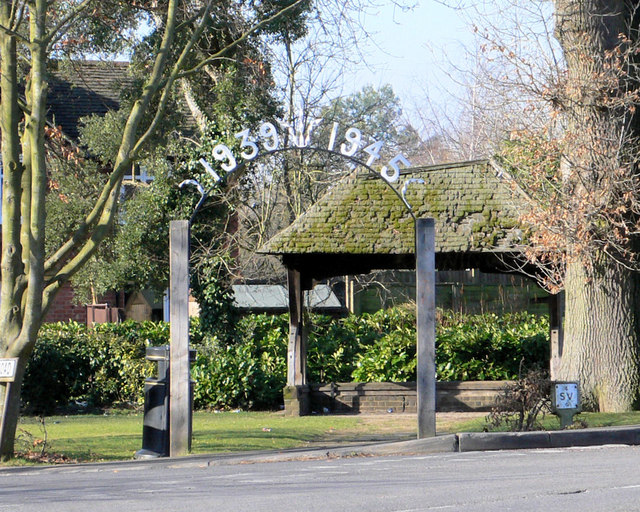
- Kennington Memorial Gate and Shelter

- Location within Kent
- Population: 11,498 11,498
- OS grid reference: TR021449
- Civil parish: Kennington
- District: Ashford
- Shire county: Kent
- Region: South East
- Country: England
- Sovereign state: United Kingdom
- Post town: ASHFORD
- Postcode district: TN24, TN25
- Dialling code: 01233
- Police: Kent
- Fire: Kent
- Ambulance: South East Coast
- UK Parliament: Ashford

Kennington is a suburb of Ashford and civil parish in Kent, England. It is about a mile northeast of the town centre and north of the M20 motorway, and contains the 13th-century church, St Mary's. The main A28 Canterbury Road and A2042 Faversham Road run through the village, and the A251 Trinity Road skirts the western edge. In recent years the village has expanded with the building of new housing estates in Little Burton, Trinity Road, Conningbrook Lakes, and planned for Conningbrook Park and Eureka Park.

The Great Stour river and the Kennington stream run through the area.

== History ==
In 1798, Kennington was described as being situated in a predominantly gravelly yet fertile landscape. Hasted theorised that the name derived from the Saxon Cining-tune (king's town) due to it being owned by Saxon royalty during the heptarchy. Hasted also described two minor streams that watered the area: one originating at Sandyhurst and passing Bybrook, known locally as Bacon's Water, and the other rising near Eastwell Park, flowing through Clipmill and Frogbrook before joining the River Stour on the parish's eastern boundary. The village itself stood on elevated ground near the Canterbury road, with the church positioned at its far end, close to an open heath called Kennington Lees. An annual fair specializing in pedlary and toys was held yearly on July 5.

St Mary's Church was built in the 13th century, and contains stained glass windows designed by Charles Eamer Kempe. The church also contains a font, which, according to Mee, has been in continuous use since 1236. It was locked in medieval times to guard from witches.

== Local Government ==
Kennington was an ancient parish, and designated a civil parish under the Poor Law Amendment Act 1866, able to set its own Poor Rate. This was reformed under the Local Government Act 1894. In 1934 the civil parish was abolished and absorbed into Ashford Urban District Council (later Ashford Borough Council).

Following a Community Governance Review, new Borough ward boundaries took effect from May 2019. Kennington gained representation through a new civil parish council formed on 1 April 2019, with the title Kennington Community Council.

Kennington Town Council is composed of elected councillors representing several wards within the parish. Councillors are elected every four years. The Clerk and Responsible Financial Officer is Deborah Prior. Deborah supports councillors day to day by preparing agendas, taking minutes, and keeping meetings compliant with statutory requirements. As Responsible Financial Officer, she manages the Council's budgets, payments, and financial reporting. She also handles correspondence, coordinates projects, and acts as the main point of contact between the Council and residents, ensuring everything runs smoothly behind the scenes.

In April 2026, Kennington Community Council adopted the title of Kennington Town Council. As part of this change, the Chairman of the Council became known as The Worshipful, The Town Mayor of Kennington and the Deputy Chairman of the Council became known as the Deputy Town Mayor of Kennington. In April 2026, following the change Councillor Matthew J. Bridger became The Worshipful, The Town Mayor of Kennington and Councillor Alan Cooper became the Deputy Town Mayor of Kennington until the Annual Meeting in May 2026.

At the Annual Meeting of May 2026, Councillor Matthew J.Bridger was elected as The Worshipful, The Town Mayor of Kennington with Councillor Chacko Jacob elected as Deputy Town Mayor of Kennington.

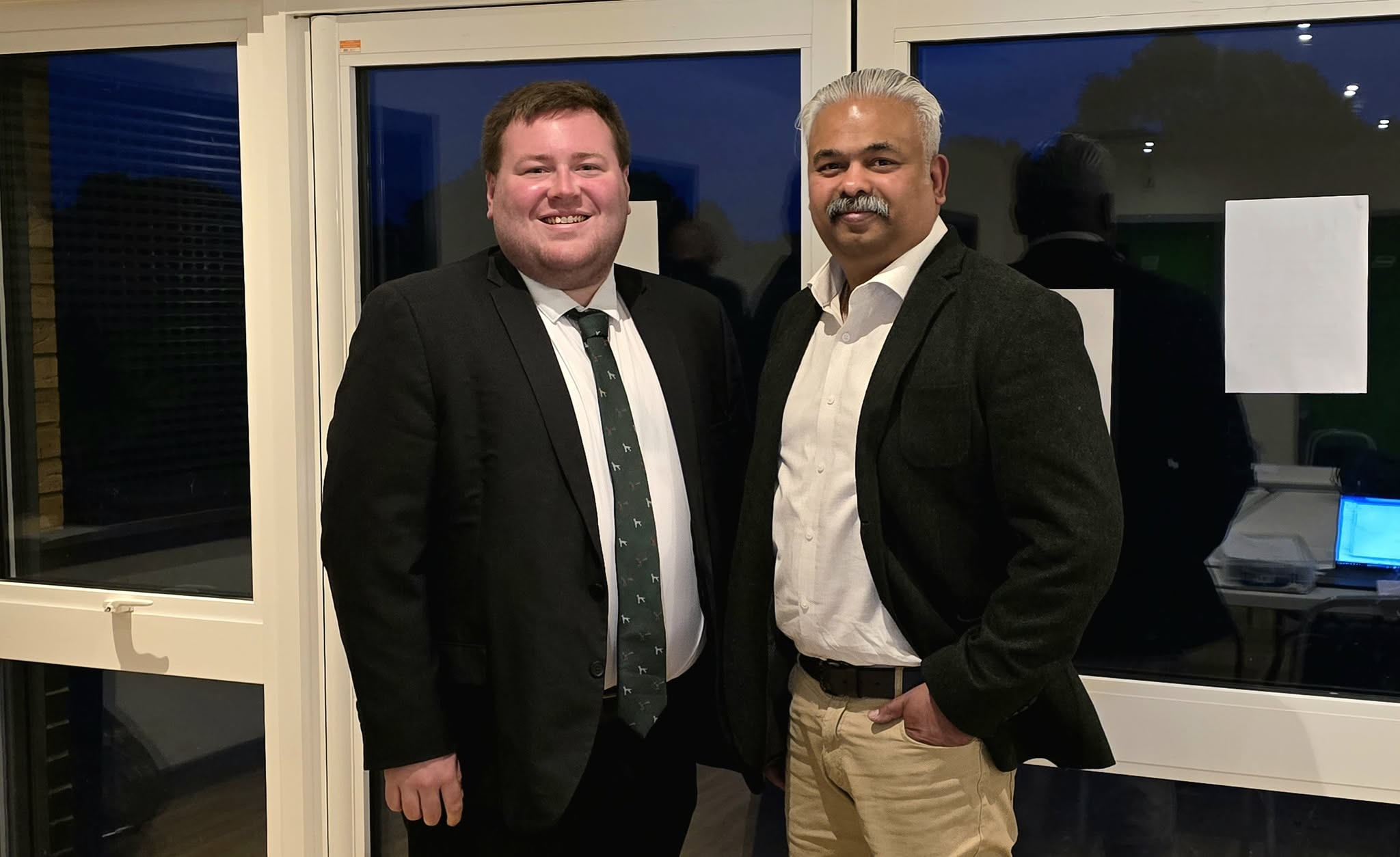

The Worshipful Town Mayor of Kennington, Cllr Matthew J. Bridger (Left) and Deputy Mayor of Kennington Cllr Chacko Jacob (Right)

The new Borough and Town Council wards are as follows:

Borough Ward	Ashford Borough Councillor	Party	Town Council Ward	Number of Town Councillor Seats
Bockhanger	Diccon Spain	Elected as Labour Party till May 2026 then switched to the Green Party	Grosvenor Hall	4
Kennington	Nathan Iliffe	Conservative	Kennington	4
Bybrook	Alan Dean	Elected as Labour Party till May 2025 then switched to the Green Party	Bybrook	4
Conningbrook and Little Burton Farm	Katy Pauley	Ashford Independent	Little Burton Farm	3
Goat Lees (part)	Winston Michael	Ashford Independent	Kennington North	1

Elections to Kennington Town Council are held every four years, on the same date as elections to Ashford Borough Council. The next election is on 6 May 2027.

== Schools ==
There is one secondary school in the village, the Towers School, with a local junior school, Kennington CE Academy, and an infants school, Downs View Infants School. Since the county still operates a grammar school system, those who pass the Kent Test (which replaced the 11+) are given the opportunity to attend the grammar school in Ashford, the Norton Knatchbull School or Highworth Grammar School.

== Amenities ==
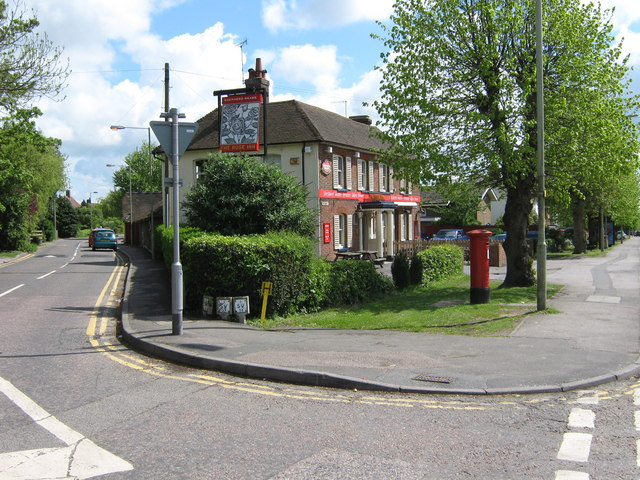
The Rose Inn, Kennington

Kennington has five pubs / restaurants, "The Old Mill" (formerly The Golden Ball), "The Conningbrook Hotel" (formerly The Pilgrims Rest), "The Rose Inn", "The Pheasant", "Stubbs" and "The Kennington Carvery".

Kennington Summer Fayre is held annually, usually on the last Saturday in June. It is a not-for-profit event, raising money for local causes.

Two areas of Kennington were designated as Conservation Areas in 1996, covering parts of Ball Lane, The Street, Ulley Road, Upper Vicarage Road, and Faversham Road.

== Demography ==
At the 2021 UK census, Kennington had a population of 10,900 (59,597,500 people in England and Wales), of which Female 52.1% and Male 47.9%. The age distribution across Kennington was: 0–19 years 25.1%, 20–39 years 21.9%, 40–59 years 26.4%, 60–79 years 20.6%, 80 years and over 16.1%.

=== National identity ===
- One or more UK identity only 92.5%
- UK identity and non-UK identity 1.7%
- Non-UK identity only 5.8%

=== Economic activity status ===
- Economically active: In employment 57.3%
- Economically active: Unemployed 2.5%
- Economically inactive 40.2%

=== Occupation ===
1. Managers, directors and senior officials 13.3%
2. Professional occupations 19.8%
3. Associate professional and technical occupations 12.5%
4. Administrative and secretarial occupations 10.0%
5. Skilled trades occupations 10.7%
6. Caring, leisure and other service occupations 9.2%
7. Sales and customer service occupations 8.9%
8. Process, plant and machine operatives 6.3%
9. Elementary occupations 9.2%

=== Highest level of qualification ===
- No qualifications 18.7%
- Level 1, 2 or 3 qualifications 44.3%
- Apprenticeship 5.8%
- Level 4 qualifications and above 28.1%
- Other qualifications 3.1%

=== Tenure of household ===
- Owns outright 37.6%
- Owns with a mortgage or loan or shared ownership 33.9%
- Social rented 15.7%
- Private rented or lives rent free 12.8%

=== Accommodation type ===
- Whole house or bungalow 90.4%
- Flat, maisonette or apartment 9.5%
- A caravan or other mobile or temporary structure 0.1%

=== Household deprivation ===
- Household is not deprived in any dimension 46.9%
- Household is deprived in one dimension 35.4%
- Household is deprived in two dimensions 14.7%
- Household is deprived in three dimensions 2.9%
- Household is deprived in four dimensions 0.1%

=== Religion ===
- No religion 40.7%
- Christian 48.6%
- Buddhist 0.7%
- Hindu 2.1%
- Jewish 0.2%
- Muslim 1.7%
- Sikh 0.1%
- Other religion 0.7%
- Not answered 5.2%

=== Number of cars or vans ===
- No cars or vans in household 15.6%
- 1 car or van in household 40.2%
- 2 cars or vans in household 32.8%
- 3 or more cars or vans in household 11.4%

== See also ==
- Listed buildings in Kennington, Kent
