= Stodmarsh =

Village in Kent, England

Coordinates: 51.3008°N 1.1828°E

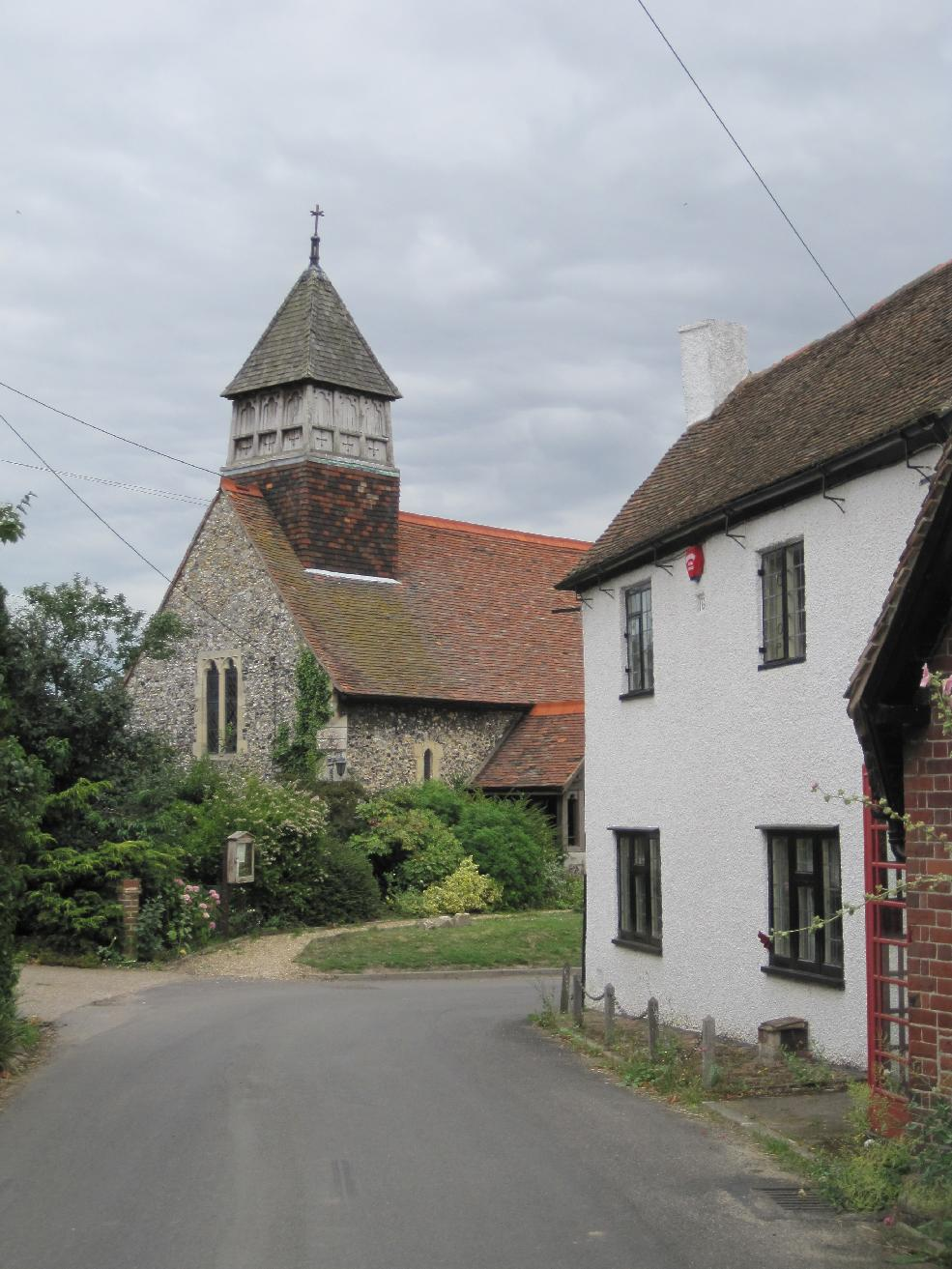

- Location within Kent
- Population: 55
- OS grid reference: TR2261
- Civil parish: Wickhambreaux
- District: Canterbury
- Shire county: Kent
- Region: South East
- Country: England
- Sovereign state: United Kingdom
- Post town: Canterbury
- Postcode district: CT3
- Dialling code: 01227
- Police: Kent
- Fire: Kent
- Ambulance: South East Coast
- UK Parliament: Canterbury

Stodmarsh is a small village in the civil parish of Wickhambreaux, in the Canterbury district, in east Kent, England. It is 5 miles to the east of Canterbury, overlooking the valley of the River Stour.

The name Stodmarsh is derived from the Saxon words "stode", meaning mare, and "merse", a marsh, demonstrating its former use of pasture for cattle among the marshes.

== History ==
Stodmarsh has been occupied since at least Saxon times, and Saxon burial tumuli have been found near Stodmarsh Court, the 17th century former manor house.

In 686 king Eadric of Kent gave the manor, consisting of three ploughlands in the marsh called "Stodmersh", to the monastery of St Augustine in Canterbury. In 1270 Henry III extended this by granting free-warren in all their demesne lands of "Stodmarsch" to the abbot.

When the monastery was dissolved in 1537 by Henry VIII the manor fell into the hands of the king, before being granted to John Master of East Langdon six years later who moved to Stodmarsh Court.

In 1931 the civil parish had a population of 107. On 1 April 1934 the parish was abolished and merged with Wickhambreaux. It falls into the deanery of Bridge within the diocese of Canterbury.

== Church ==
The church, dedicated to St Mary is small and consists of a single aisle and chancel. It has a low pointed turret at the western end containing two bells.

This church was originally part of the possessions of the abbey at Canterbury, and remained so until 1243, when the abbot Robert, at the insistence of archdeacon Simon de Langton, granted it to the hospital of poor priests in Canterbury, together with four acres of Stodmarsh, on the condition that they should not demand in future any tithes from the abbey. When the hospital was dissolved in 1575 Elizabeth I gave all its possessions to the city of Canterbury. Stodmarsh church seems not to have been passed to the city but instead fell to the archdeaconry of Canterbury where it still remains.

The church was first built in the 12th and 13th centuries and modernised around 1880. The porch contains notable carvings known as "Crusaders' Crosses". The X-shaped brace that supports the bell turret is believed to be unique in Kent.

== Village life ==
The village has one public house, the Red Lion. Originally built in the fifteenth century, it was rebuilt in 1801 after a fire.

== Nature Reserve ==
The Stodmarsh National Nature Reserve lies immediately to the north and the Stour Valley Walk passes through the village. Covering an area of 241 hectares of wetlands, the reserve is known for the diversity of birds that have been sighted there, with over 200 species recorded.
