= Little Stour =

River in Kent, England

Coordinates: 51°19′30″N 1°15′11″E

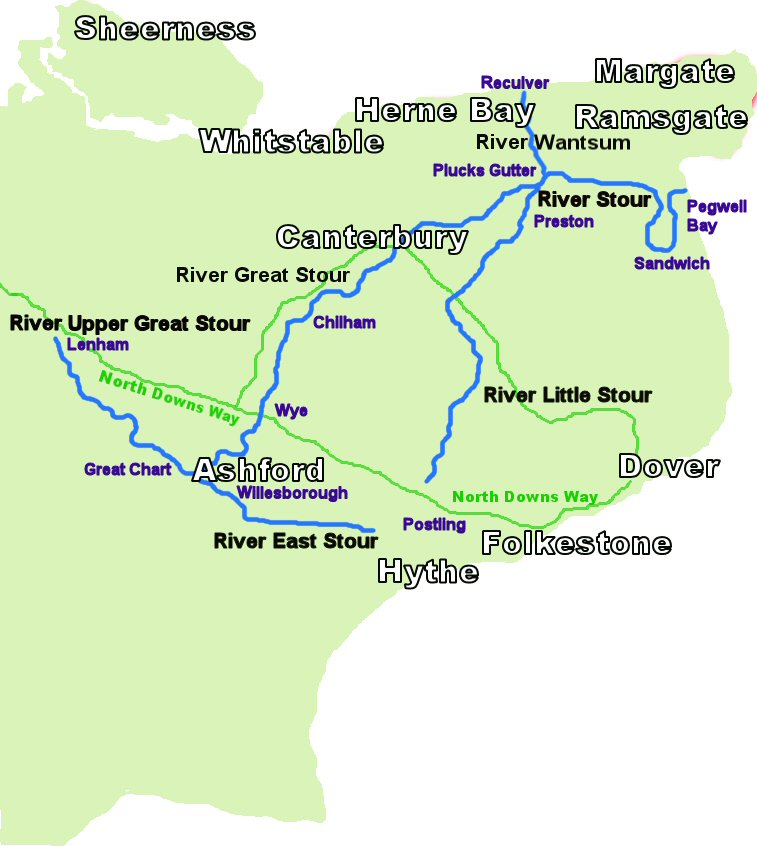
- River Stour and Tributaries

Physical characteristics
- Source
  - location: Lyminge
- Mouth
  - location: River Stour

The Little Stour is one of the tributaries of the River Stour in the English county of Kent. The upper reaches of the river is known as the Nailbourne, whilst the lower reaches were once known as the Seaton Navigation.

The intermittent source of the Nailbourne is at Lyminge, and in its early reaches from Lyminge to Bekesbourne it forms a chalk stream and winterbourne. Below Bekesbourne it joins the Little Stour, which in turn joins with the Great Stour at Plucks Gutter near East Stourmouth.

== Course ==
=== Nailbourne ===
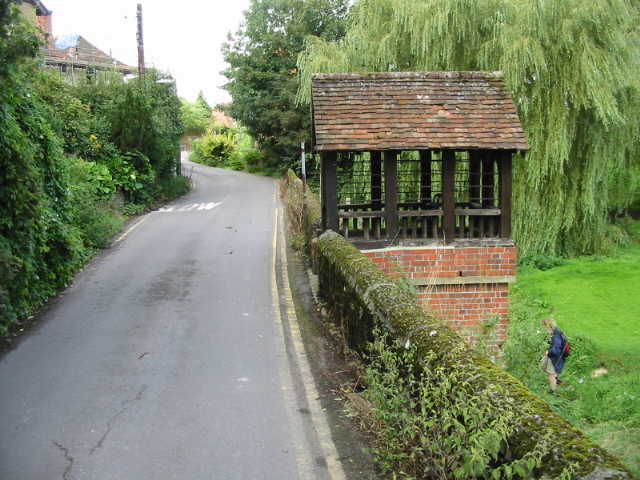
Ethelburga's Well

The Nailbourne flows from Lyminge, through the Elham Valley until it joins the Little Stour at Bekesbourne.

The Nailbourne bubbles up beneath St Ethelburga's Well in Tayne Field in the centre of Lyminge. Whilst the stream often holds a plentiful supply of water from Lyminge to Elham throughout the year, it rarely holds any water from Elham to Bishopsbourne even in the winter months. However, in wet years the normally dry ditch can turn into a fast flowing torrent, flooding roads, fields and houses. An example of this was in 2001 when there was extensive flooding throughout the Elham Valley.

There are a number of minor tributaries that flow into the Nailbourne throughout the Elham Valley. Most are nameless although Ordnance Survey maps do mark a stream known as the East Brooke which runs from Etchinghill and joins the Nailbourne at Lyminge.

=== Little Stour ===
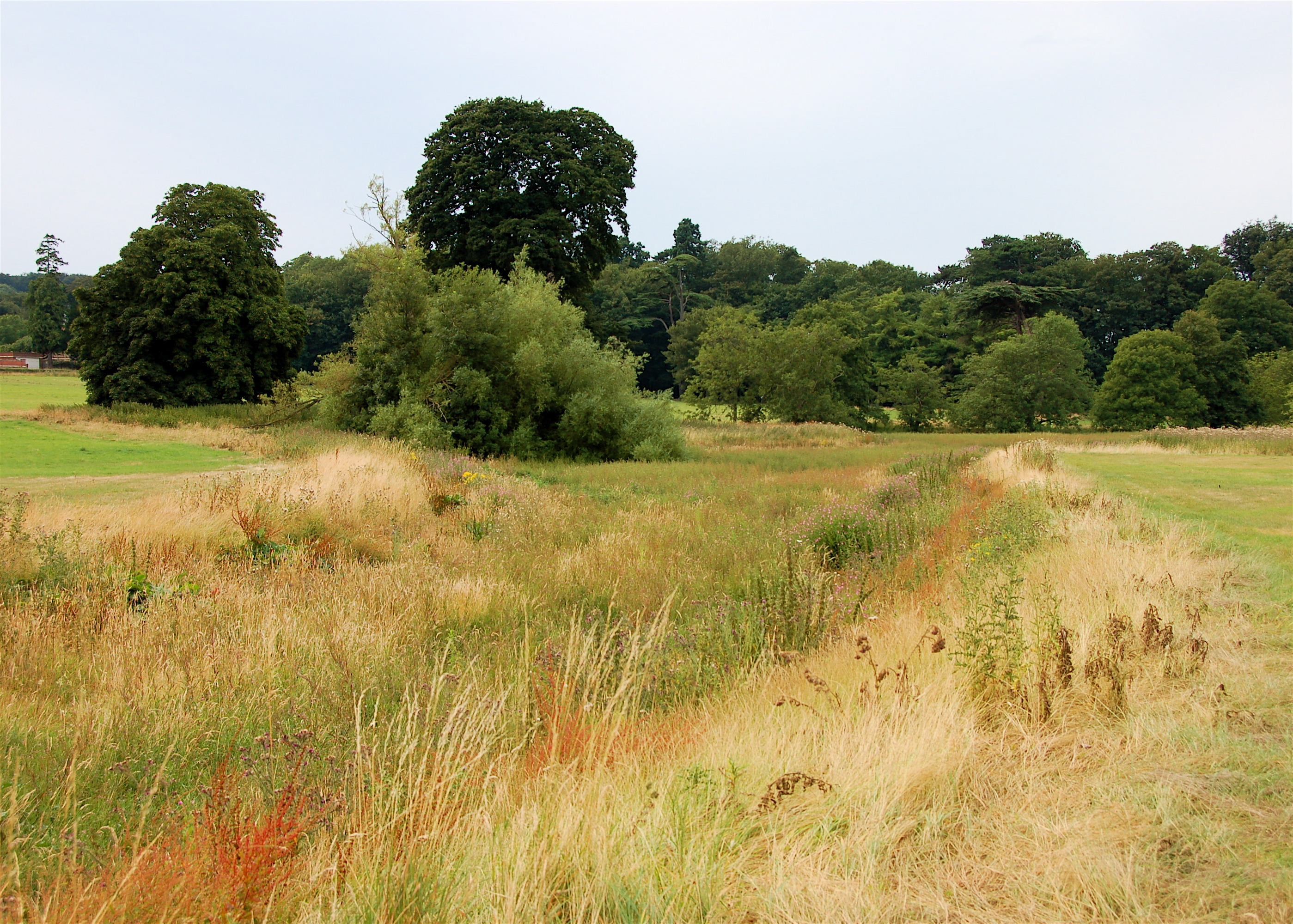
The Nailbourne near Bishopsbourne on 22 July 2006. Even when there is no water in the stream it is still a haven for wildlife.

The Little Stour starts at the springs near Well Chapel, Bekesbourne, after the watercress beds the Nailbourne joins the Little Stour (when it is running) and then joins with the Great Stour at Plucks Gutter near West Stourmouth. The merged river is usually known as the River Stour.

== Settlements ==
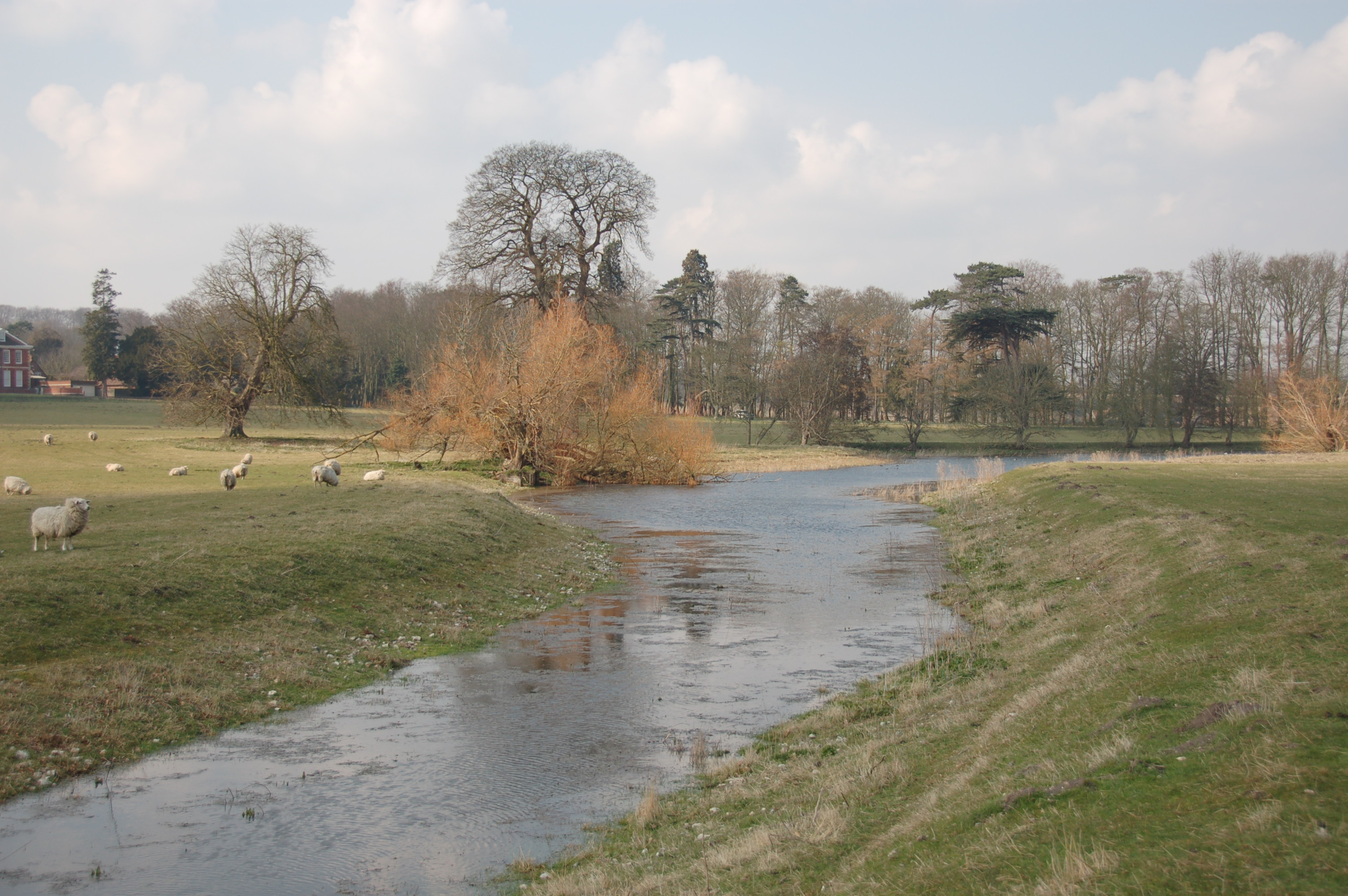
The Nailbourne near Bishopsbourne on 25 March 2007.

The river flows through the following settlements -

- Lyminge
- Elham
- Barham
- Kingston
- Bishopsbourne
- Bridge
- Patrixbourne
- Bekesbourne
- Littlebourne
- Wickhambreaux
- Ickham
- West Stourmouth

== Economy ==
=== Water mills ===
The Little Stour powered four watermills, at Littlebourne, Wickhambreaux and Ickham.

=== Navigation ===
The stretch of the river downstream from the mills and wharf at Seaton, in the parish of Ickham, was made navigable at some time prior to 1831. As a consequence it was sometimes referred to as the Seaton Navigation.

== Environment ==
On 28 September 2007 Environment Secretary, Phil Woolas, announced that the Little Stour would be one of 24 additional sensitive areas in England that have been identified as at risk from excessive nutrients from sewage treatment works. This means that Southern Water will be obliged under the Urban Waste Water Treatment Regulations to take action by 2014 to reduce phosphorus and nitrates in the discharges from their sewage treatment works which discharge into the Little Stour.

In early 2007 it was revealed that an application had been made by a company called Newater to discharge treated sewage into the Nailbourne at Elham. The sewage would be piped from the Broomfield Banks treatment works near Dover into the Nailbourne at North Elham with the intention of addressing the water supply deficit in South East England. Whilst the Environment Agency has given assurance that the scheme is safe the application has raised concerns including those of the Little Stour & Nailbourne River Management Group. The application is one of nine similar applications by Newater PLC in the Southern part of England. The Environment Agency is expected to make a decision on the Nailbourne application later in the year.

== Legend ==
According to legend it was Saint Augustine who performed a miracle and brought water to the Elham Valley. When there is a drought and the stream runs dry it is because of Woden and Thor (whom the local people had previously worshipped) who were displeased with what St Augustine had done. It is also local superstition that the Nailbourne only flows once every seven years and that when it does flow it is a sign of bad luck.

== In popular culture ==
Author Russell Hoban repurposes the Nailbourne as "Nellys Bum" in his 1980, post apocalyptic novel Riddley Walker.

== Governance ==
Although Little Stour is known for the river an electoral ward exists in the same name. This ward includes Littlebourne and surrounding villages. At the 2011 Census the ward had a population of 2,718.
