= Wantsum Channel =

Strait in Kent, England

Coordinates: 51.34401°N 1.3066167°E

The Wantsum Channel was a strait separating the Isle of Thanet from the north-eastern extremity of the English county of Kent and connecting the English Channel and the Thames Estuary. It was a major shipping route when Britain was part of the Roman Empire, and continued in use until it was closed by silting in the late Middle Ages. Its course is now represented by the River Stour and the River Wantsum, which is little more than a drainage ditch lying between Reculver and St Nicholas-at-Wade and joins the Stour about 1.7 miles (2.7 km) south-east of Sarre.

== Toponymy ==
Eilert Ekwall, a 20th-century authority on English place-names, wrote that the name "Wantsum" derives from an Old English word "wandsum", meaning "winding". (Note: A variant spelling of the Old English word "wandsum" is "wendsum". A variant, modern spelling of Wantsum as "Wansum" is also found.) Bede, writing in or before 731, mentioned the Wantsum (Vantsumu) in describing the Isle of Thanet, but he also recorded an alternative name: he described the church at Reculver as being juxta ostium aquilonale fluminis Genladae, or "by the north mouth of the river Genlade". Ekwall compared this to the name of Yantlet Creek, which separates the Isle of Grain from mainland Kent. He suggested an origin in the Old English word gegnlad meaning "'backwater' or the like, [and] very likely the source of the word inlet [for] 'arm of the sea, [or] creek'." (Note: W. Scott Robertson, quoting William Lambarde and W. W. Skeat, offered a similar interpretation with an emphasis on discharge.)

== History ==
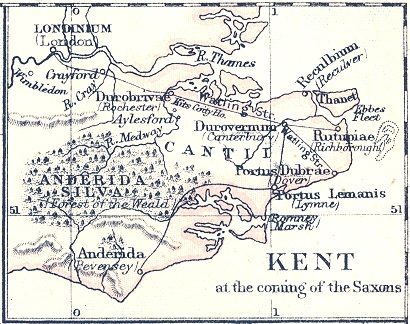
A general map showing late Roman Kent. The Wantsum Channel lay between the Isle of Thanet and the British mainland, in the north eastern corner of Kent

From prehistory until the Middle Ages, the Wantsum Channel was joined by the River Stour, which entered it at Stourmouth close to its midpoint; it was a two-mile-wide (3 km) strait. The southern end of the channel met the sea at Richborough (Rutupiae), downstream of Sandwich, while the northern end met the Thames Estuary at Reculver (Regulbium). That the Romans chose both sites for forts indicates the significance of the route, which their shipping commonly used to travel between Britain and continental Europe. Vikings raided Canterbury via the Wantsum in 839.

Deposition of coarse rocks at Stonar, at the southern end of the Channel, gradually caused it to silt up; and shipping heading for Canterbury, formerly using the northern entrance, brought Fordwich into prominence as its outport. The silting continued, particularly during the 12th and 13th centuries, when Augustinian monks entered into land reclamation; eventually, by the 16th century, the Wantsum Channel had dried up, apart from the large drainage ditch down the centre of the former channel, and associated feeder ditches.

Efforts made by the monks of Minster-in-Thanet to manage the Wantsum in the Middle Ages are reflected in two names for parts of the Channel and Stour, "Abbot's Wall" and "Monk's Wall". During the 18th century, silting threatened the rich port of Sandwich and efforts were made to create sluices and channels to control the waters. These ultimately failed, and as a result Sandwich is now some distance from the sea. Regarding the northern end of the Channel, it has been estimated that the Roman fort at Reculver was originally about 1 mile (1.6 km) from the sea to the north, but by 1540, when John Leland recorded a visit there, the coastline to the north had receded to within little more than a quarter of a mile (400 m). It may be that sediment from this erosion contributed to the blocking of the north mouth of the Wantsum. The southern section of the Wantsum Channel is represented by the River Stour, which empties into the Strait of Dover at Pegwell Bay.

The North Sea flood of 1953 led to the flooding of the land where the Wantsum Channel formerly ran, and briefly made the Isle of Thanet an island again.

The Wantsum Channel area features in four recreational walking routes, these being the Saxon Shore Way, the Stour Valley Walk, the Wantsum Walk and the Way of St Augustine.
