= Sarre, Kent =

Village in Kent, England

Coordinates: 51.3392°N 1.2391°E

Sarre
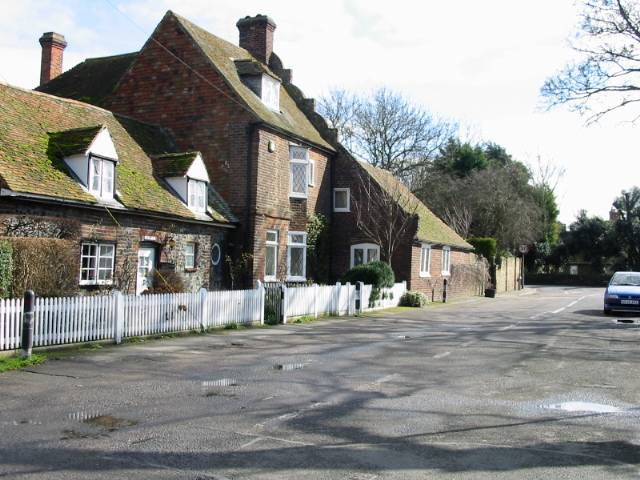
- Houses on Old Road, Sarre

- Location within Kent
- Interactive map of Sarre
- Population: 222 (2011)
- OS grid reference: TR255645
- Civil parish: Sarre
- District: Thanet
- Shire county: Kent
- Region: South East
- Country: England
- Sovereign state: United Kingdom
- Post town: Birchington
- Postcode district: CT7
- Dialling code: 01843
- Police: Kent
- Fire: Kent
- Ambulance: South East Coast
- UK Parliament: Herne Bay and Sandwich

Sarre is a village and civil parish in Thanet District in Kent, England. The village is a part of St. Nicholas-at-Wade ecclesiastical parish, after having lost the local church of St. Giles in Elizabethan times; the ecclesiastical parishes were subsequently combined. In its own right Sarre is an Ancient Parish. It has a population of 130, increasing to 222 at the 2011 Census.

Sarre is located at the point where the old 'Island Road' from Margate to Canterbury crossed the Wantsum Channel initially by a ferry and from the late Middle Ages by a bridge. The route of this bridge is followed by a short section of the modern A28 and is still marked on some maps as Sarre Wall.

== History ==
=== Mediaeval ===
The important late Roman or early Anglo-Saxon Sarre Brooch was found near the village; it is now on display in the British Museum (near the Sutton Hoo finds), along with many other important early mediaeval artefacts from the same cemetery.

The coastal confederation of Cinque Ports during its mediaeval period consisted of a confederation of 42 towns and villages in all. Sarre was included, under the 'limb' of Sandwich, Kent.

=== World War II ===
In July 1940 the village was turned into a model strong point by the 1st Canadian Pioneer Battalion. Within three weeks the village bristled with defences including fifteen casemates and a variety of flame traps, flame fougasses and other anti-tank devices.

The Canadian commander Andrew McNaughton later recalled: "I turned a pioneer battalion loose to fortify Sarre in every possible way. They took ladies' boudoirs and turned them into machine-gun posts without showing anything from the outside; I'm sure they never got the concrete out. There was a big building inside the village that had a hoist for casks. The boys arranged a big barrel of petroleum, with phosphorus bombs inside, that was all poised ready to swing. When a tank came through the village and slowed to make the turn they would just pull a catch and the barrel would smack the tank fair and square and go off with a great gust of flame." (Note: McNaughton quoted by Swettenham.)

While McNaughton was inspecting the defences in August 1940, the village was attacked from the air and three bombs were dropped. A cottage was hit killing one adult and two or three children.

== Today ==
The village has one public house, The Crown Inn – this being known locally as the 'Cherry Brandy House'. A special recipe of Cherry Brandy can be purchased from behind the bar. A second public house, the King's Head, had closed by 2010 and was sold privately.

The village mill (Sarre Windmill) was previously open to the public as a working windmill. Both the ground floor of the windmill and the mill shop became holiday accommodation. The surrounding buildings, including the Old Bakery and the Old Granary (which was originally thatched), have been sold privately and are now subdivided properties.

== See all ==
- Listed buildings in Sarre, Kent
