= Bishopstone Cliffs =

Protected cliffs in Kent, United Kingdom

Coordinates: 51.376°N 1.177°E

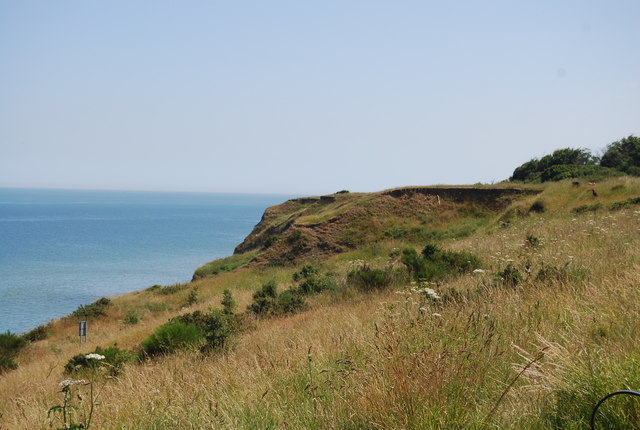
- Interactive map of Bishopstone Cliffs
- Type: Local Nature Reserve
- Location: Herne Bay, Kent
- OS grid: TR 212 689
- Area: 67.4 hectares (167 acres)
- Manager: Canterbury City Council

Bishopstone Cliffs is a 67.4-hectare (167-acre) Local Nature Reserve in Reculver on the eastern outskirts of Herne Bay, Kent. It is owned and managed by Canterbury City Council. It is part of Thanet Coast Site of Special Scientific Interest, and Thanet Coast and Sandwich Bay Ramsar site and Special Protection Area.

This is a grassland site on the top of cliffs, and it has some rare insect species. Sand martins nest in holes in the cliffs, and other birds include skylarks, meadow pipits and corn buntings.

There is public access to the site, most of which is within Reculver Country Park.
