= Reculver =

Seaside village in Kent, England

Coordinates: 51.3786°N 1.1979°E

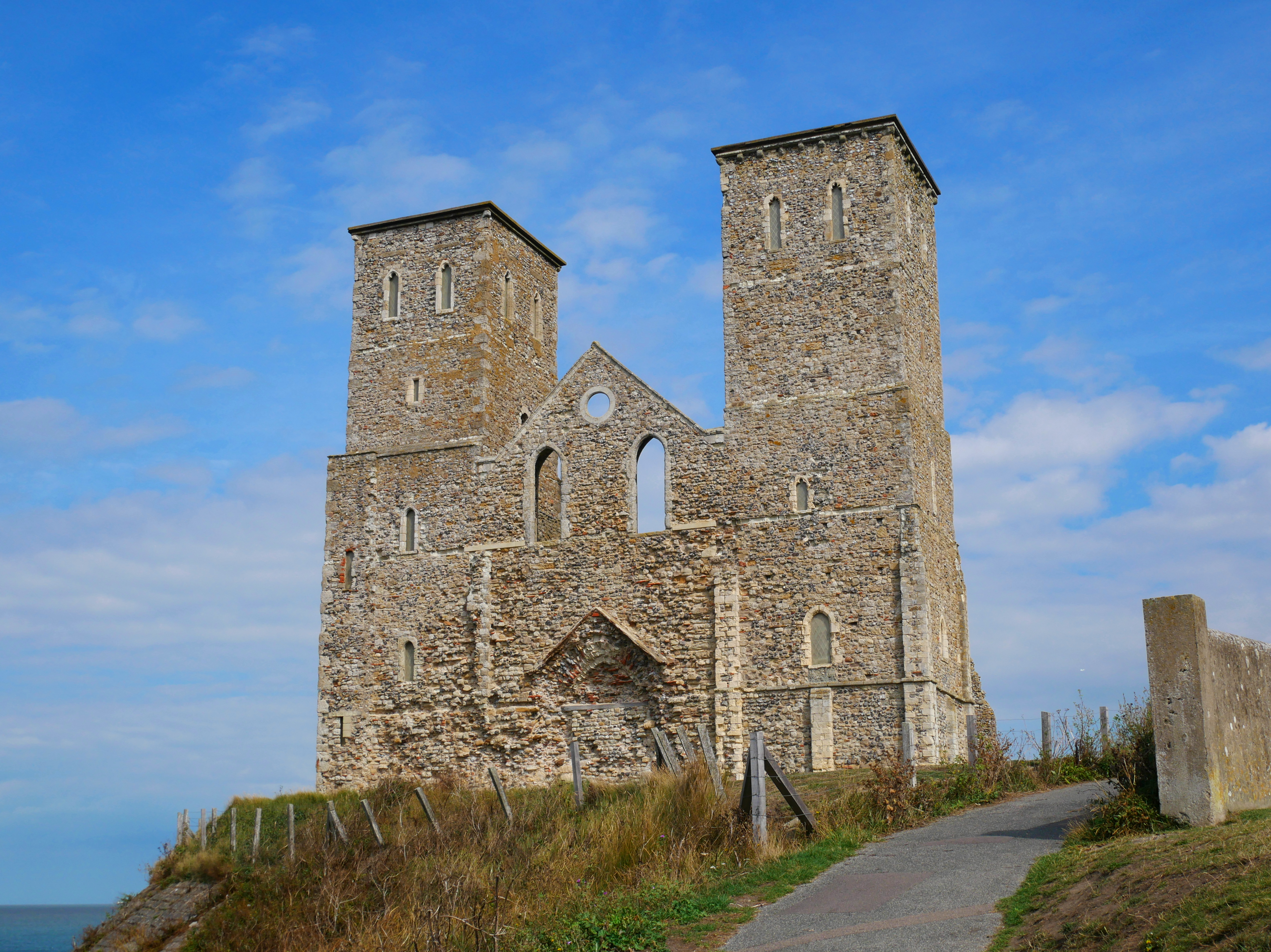
- The twin towers of St Mary's Church

- Location within Kent
- Area: 2.79 sq mi (7.2 km^{2})
- Population: 4,400 (2021 census)
  - Density: 1,577/sq mi (609/km^{2})
- OS grid reference: TR2269
- District: City of Canterbury
- Shire county: Kent
- Region: South East
- Country: England
- Sovereign state: United Kingdom
- Post town: HERNE BAY
- Postcode district: CT6
- Dialling code: 01227
- Police: Kent
- Fire: Kent
- Ambulance: South East Coast
- UK Parliament: Herne Bay and Sandwich

Reculver is a village and coastal resort about 3 miles (5 km) east of Herne Bay on the north coast of Kent in south-east England. It is in the ward of the same name, in the City of Canterbury district of Kent.

Reculver once occupied a strategic location at the north-western end of the Wantsum Channel, a sea lane that separated the Isle of Thanet and the Kent mainland until the late Middle Ages. This led the Romans to build a small fort there at the time of their conquest of Britain in 43 AD, and, starting late in the 2nd century, they built a larger fort, or castrum, called Regulbium, which later became one of the chain of Saxon Shore forts. Following the end of Roman administration of Britain in the early fifth century the Britons again took control of the region until the Anglo-Saxon invasions shortly afterward.

By the 7th century Reculver had become a landed estate of the Anglo-Saxon kings of Kent. The site of the Roman fort was given over for the establishment of a monastery dedicated to the Virgin Mary in 669 AD, and King Eadberht II of Kent was buried there in the 760s. During the Middle Ages Reculver was a thriving township with a weekly market and a yearly fair, and was part of the Cinque Port of Sandwich. The settlement declined, however, as the Wantsum Channel silted up, and coastal erosion claimed many buildings constructed on the soft sandy cliffs. The village was largely abandoned in the late 18th century, and most of St Mary's Church was demolished in the early 19th century. Protecting the ruins and the rest of Reculver from erosion is an ongoing challenge.

The 20th century saw a revival as local tourism developed and there are now two caravan parks. The 2021 census recorded about 4,400 people in the Reculver area. The Reculver coastline is within a Site of Special Scientific Interest, a Special Protection Area and a Ramsar site, including most of Reculver Country Park, which itself includes much of Bishopstone Cliffs local nature reserve. While nationally scarce plants and insects are found there, the location is also important for migrating birds and is of significant geological interest.

== History ==
=== Toponymy ===
The earliest recorded form of the name, Regulbium, is in Latin and dates from the early 5th century or before, but it had its origin in a Common Brittonic word meaning "at the promontory" or "great headland". In Old English this became corrupted to Raculf, sometimes given as Raculfceastre, giving rise to the modern "Reculver". (Note: "Many more [Old English] forms are on record.") The form "Raculfceastre" includes the Old English place-name element "ceaster", which frequently relates to "a [Roman] city or walled town".

=== Prehistoric and Roman ===
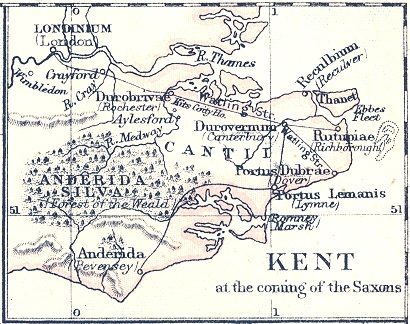
Map of Kent early in the 5th century, showing how Reculver (marked here as "Reculbium" at top right) was then at the north-eastern corner of mainland Kent, with the Wantsum Channel between it and the Isle of Thanet: Gardiner, S.R., A School Atlas Of English History, 1892

Stone Age flint tools have been washed out from the cliffs to the west of Reculver, and a Mesolithic tranchet axe was found near the centre of the Roman fort in 1960. This was probably an accidental loss, rather than suggesting a human settlement, evidence for which begins with late Bronze Age and Iron Age ditches. These indicate an extensive settlement, where a Bronze Age palstave and Iron Age gold coins have been found. This was followed by a "fortlet" built by the Romans during their conquest of Britain, which began in 43 AD, and the existence of a Roman road leading to Canterbury, about 8.5 miles (13.7 km) to the south-west, indicates a Roman presence at Reculver from then onwards. A full-size fort, or castrum, was started late in the 2nd century. This date is derived in part from a reconstruction of a uniquely detailed plaque, fragments of which were found by archaeologists in the 1960s. The plaque effectively records the establishment of the fort, since it commemorates the construction of two of its principal features, the basilica and the sacellum, or shrine, both being parts of the headquarters building, or principia:

this [was] the first time the inscribed phrase aedes principiorum [could] be ... identified with the official shrine of [a Roman military] headquarters building, hitherto unmentioned in any inscription ... [It was] also the first certain ... application of the name basilica to [this element of the building].

— Ian Richmond, The Antiquaries Journal, 1961

These structures were found by archaeologists, together with probable officers' quarters, barracks and a bath house. (Note: A reconstruction of the fort is illustrated at Wilmott 2012, p. 23.) A Roman oven found 200 feet (61 m) south-east of the fort was probably used for drying food such as corn and fish; its main chamber measured about 16 feet (4.9 m) by 15 feet (4.8 m) overall.

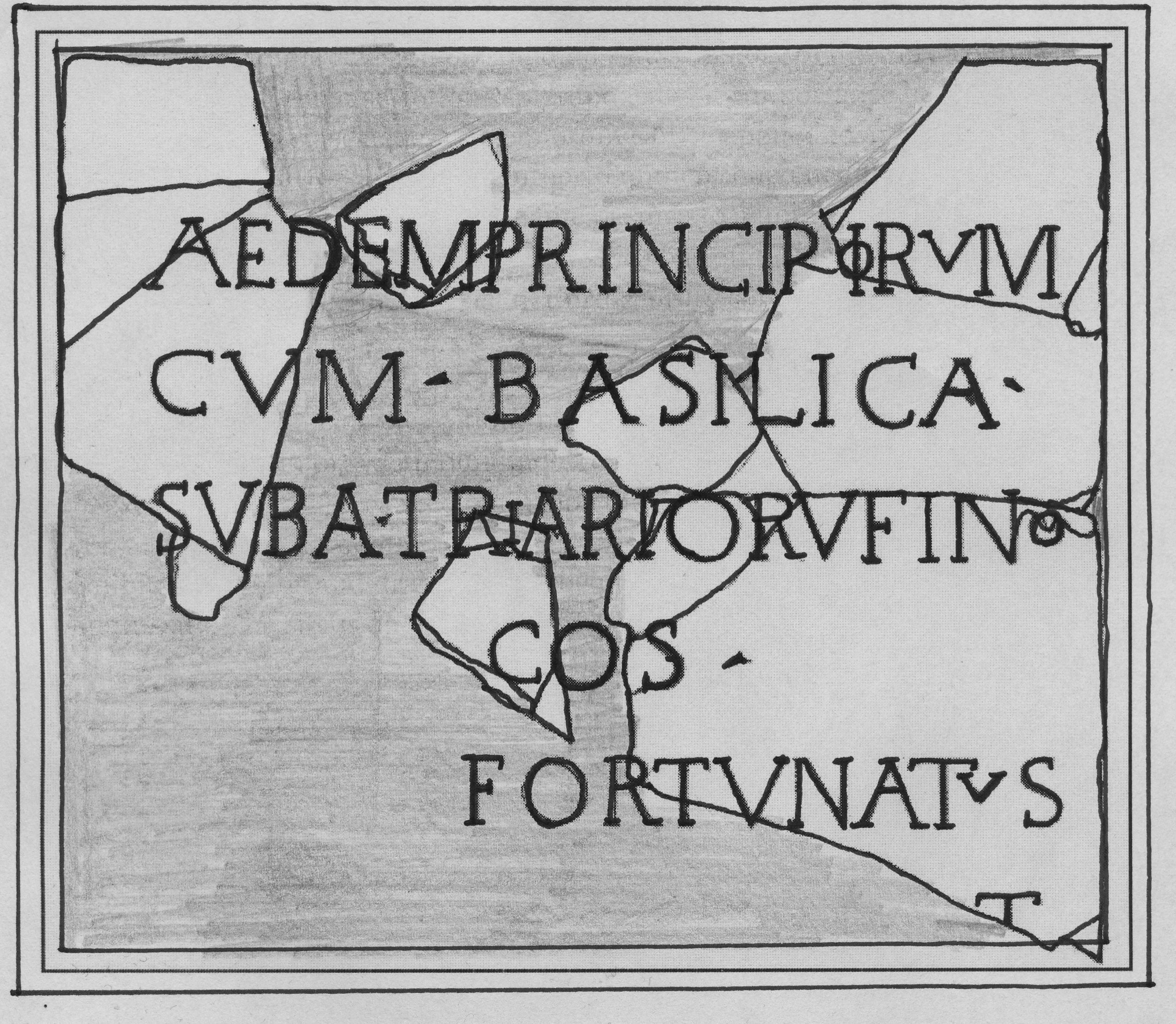
Reconstruction of the plaque recording the establishment of the fort

The fort was located on a low hill, beyond which a long promontory then projected north-eastwards into the sea and formed the north-eastern extremity of mainland Kent: thus it offered observation on all sides, including both the Thames Estuary and the sea lane later known as the Wantsum Channel, which lay between it and the Isle of Thanet. (Note: Philp 2005, Fig. 4, shows a conjectured Roman coastline around Reculver, where the fort is located near the root of a promontory projecting about 1.25 miles (2 km) north-eastwards into the sea. This promontory is defined on its north-western side by a long inlet of the sea, and on its south-eastern side by the Wantsum Channel, and is made a peninsula by an inlet of the Wantsum Channel immediately south of the Roman fort.) It was probably built by soldiers of the Cohors I Baetasiorum, originally from Lower Germany, who had previously served at the Roman fort of Alauna at Maryport in Cumbria at least until the early 180s, since tiles recovered from the fort are stamped "CIB". The Notitia Dignitatum, a Roman administrative document from the early 5th century, also records the presence of the Cohors I Baetasiorum at Reculver, then known as Regulbium. There must also have been a harbour nearby in Roman times, and, though this has not yet been found, it was probably near to the fort's southern or eastern side. (Note: "The evidence suggests that [most of the Saxon Shore forts] were constructed c. 225–290, and this means that the system was conceived about sixty years before the historical records refer to Germanic raiding. The discrepancy cannot be explained if they were a purpose-built defensive system, but it can be explained if they were a series of state trans-shipment centres." Philp 2005, p. 229, suggests on archaeological grounds that there may have been "a direct link between the Cohors I Baetasiorum and the Classis Britannica [or "British Fleet"] at Regulbium and this could indicate that they shared the fort.")

The walls of the fort originally stood about 14.8 feet (4.5 m) high and were 10 feet (3 m) thick at their base, reducing to 8 feet (2.4 m) at the top; they were reinforced internally by an earthen bank. The entrance to the fort's headquarters building faced north, indicating that the main gate was on the north side, facing the eponymous promontory and the sea. The north wall has been lost to the sea, along with the adjoining part of the east wall and most of the west wall; the east wall is most complete and includes the remains of the eastern gateway and guard post. Parts of the surviving walls are all that remains of the fort above ground, and all have suffered from stone-robbing, especially near the south-western corner. (Note: Stone from the fort was presumably used in the medieval settlement at Reculver as well as the church there; it may have been taken for use in the archiepiscopal residence at Ford Palace, about 2.6 miles (4.2 km) south-west of Reculver, and in the Davis Gate (or "Barbican Gate") at Sandwich in the early 16th century; and there are records of its frequent use in the church of All Saints at Birchington-on-Sea, until at least 1584.) The walls were originally faced with ragstone, but very little of this remains: otherwise only the cores of the walls are visible, consisting mostly of flint and concrete and standing only 8.6 feet (2.6 m) high at their highest.

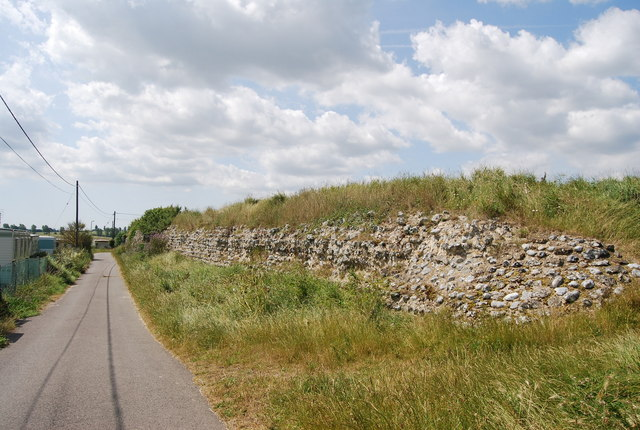
Part of the Roman south wall of Regulbium fort, seen from its south-eastern corner

Roman forts were normally accompanied by a civilian settlement, or vicus: at Reculver this lay outside the north and west sides of the fort, much of it in areas now lost to the sea, and was extensive, perhaps covering "some ten hectares [25 acres] in all." In 1936 R.F. Jessup noted that "a Roman building with a hypocaust and tesselated [floor once] stood considerably to the northward of the fort": this structure had been observed by the 17th- to 18th-century antiquarian John Battely, and was probably "an external bath house ... relating to [an early phase of] the fort." In the same area Battely described "several cisterns" between 10 and 12 feet (3–3.7 m) square, lined with oak planks and sealed at the bottom with puddled clay. He believed that these were for storing rainwater, and noted that a Roman strigil, which would have been used in a bath house, had been found in a similar cistern at Reculver; he also observed that "such a multitude [of cisterns] has been discovered, almost in our memory, as proves that the ancient inhabitants of the place were very numerous." In the 20th century twelve wells of the Roman period were identified to the west of the fort, ten of which were square; all were cut into the hard layer of sandstone below the soft sandstone of the Thanet Beds, thus tapping into the water table. (Note: Three female skeletons have been found in the Roman wells, complete with jewellery: "[i]t seems clear that these female skeletons do not represent orthodox burials, nor accidents, and it is likely that the three women were victims and that their bodies ... were thrown into these ... wells and never recovered.") These and other 20th-century finds from the Roman period extend to 1,120 feet (341.4 m) west of the fort, and date to a period between 170 and 360, roughly coinciding with the period of occupation at the fort itself.

At least 10 infant burials have been found within the fort, all of babies, of which six were associated with Roman buildings: five sets of infant remains were found within the foundations and walls of buildings, as were coins dating from 270 to 300 AD. It was suspected that more such burials might be found in the walls of a building in the south-western area of the fort if it were excavated further. (Note: Three infant skeletons discovered in the structure in the south-western area of the fort were "found incidentally in the only two critical cuts made through the walls of the building and statistically, at least, it seems likely that others may exist in the much longer lengths of walls not examined." Two of these burials are illustrated at Philp 2005, Plate XXXVIII.) A baby's feeding bottle was also found in an excavated floor within 10 feet (3 m) of one of the infant skeletons, though it may have been unconnected with the burials. The babies were probably buried in the buildings as ritual sacrifices, but it is unknown whether they were selected for burial because they were already dead, perhaps stillborn, or if they were buried alive or killed for the purpose. (Note: "The Romans officially condemned human sacrifice ... Human life was cheap on the frontier, however, and Roman auxiliaries could be as barbarous as those they fought ... Even in the most civilised parts of [Roman] Britain, the authorities seem on occasion to have turned a blind eye to infant sacrifice, which may of course have been surreptitious.") A local tale subsequently developed that the grounds of the fort were haunted by the sound of a crying baby.

Towards the end of the 3rd century a Roman naval commander named Carausius, who later declared himself emperor in Britain, was given the task of clearing pirates from the sea between Britain and the European mainland. In so doing he established a new chain of command, the British part of which was later to pass under the control of a Count of the Saxon Shore. The Notitia Dignitatum shows that the fort at Reculver became part of this arrangement, and its location meant that it lay at the "main point of contact in the system [of Saxon Shore forts]". Archaeological evidence indicates that it was abandoned in the 370s.

=== Medieval ===
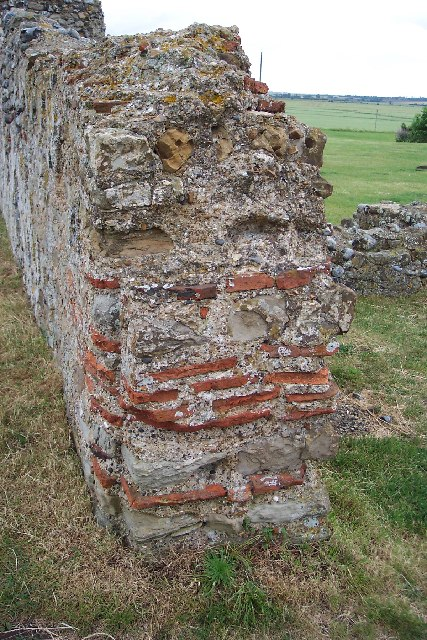
Part of the south wall of the 7th-century church, incorporating Roman brick tiles

By the 7th century Reculver was part of a landed estate of the Anglo-Saxon kings of Kent, possibly with a royal toll-station or a "significant coastal trading settlement," given the types and large quantity of coins found there. (Note: While "[it] must be certain that the Roman fort had a supporting harbour, probably a natural feature improved by quays and jetties", "[the] quantity of seventh- and eighth-century coins picked up from Reculver and its vicinity is paralleled [in England] only at Hamwic [Anglo-Saxon Southampton]: finds include gold thrymsas and some 50 sceattas, with contemporary Merovingian coins and a small group of Northumbrian issues ... Almost certainly there is some connection with Reculver's position on a major trading route".) Other early Anglo-Saxon finds include a fragment of a gilt bronze brooch, or fibula, which was originally circular and set with coloured stones or glass, a claw beaker and pottery. (Note: "[The Reculver fibula] belongs to a class of ornaments ... remarkable for peculiarities which seem almost to restrict them to the early Kentish Saxons. [John] Battely speaks of the fibulæ found at Reculver [in the late 17th and early 18th centuries], as being almost innumerable; some of these ... were constructed with much artistic skill and good workmanship; they were either enameled, or set with precious stones.") Antiquarians such as the 18th-century clergyman John Duncombe believed that King Æthelberht of Kent moved his royal court there from Canterbury in about 597, and built a palace on the site of the Roman ruins. However, archaeological excavation has shown no evidence of this; Æthelberht's household would have been peripatetic, and the story has been described as probably a "pious legend". (Note: The Roman remains at Reculver would have been "the only substantial building for miles around", but "Anglo-Saxon kings seem to have shown little interest in establishing themselves in old Roman forts." "An itinerant royal household eating and drinking the food surpluses collected at [the king's] own estates and those of his subjects ... lies at the core of the Kentish kingdom ...") A church was built on the site of the Roman fort in about 669, when King Ecgberht of Kent granted land for the foundation of a monastery, which was dedicated to St Mary.

The monastery developed as the centre of a "large estate, a manor and a parish", and, by the early 9th century, it had become "extremely wealthy", but it then fell under the control of the archbishops of Canterbury. In 811 Archbishop Wulfred is recorded as having deprived the monastery of some of its land, and soon after it featured in a "monumental showdown" between Wulfred and King Coenwulf of Mercia over the control of monasteries. In 838 control of all monasteries under Canterbury's authority was passed to the kings of Wessex, by the agreement of Archbishop Ceolnoth in exchange for protection from Viking attacks. By the 10th century the monastery at Reculver and its estate were both royal property: they were given back to the archbishops of Canterbury in 949 by King Eadred of England, at which time the estate included Hoath and Herne, and land at Chilmington, about 23.5 miles (37.8 km) to the south-west, and in the west of the Isle of Thanet.

By 1066 the monastery had become a parish church. However, in 1086 Reculver was named in the Domesday Book of 1086 as a hundred, and the manor was valued at £42.7s. (£42.35). (Note: This value can be compared with the £20 due to the archbishop from the manor of Maidstone and £50 from the borough of Sandwich. Of the £42.7s. from Reculver, £7.7s. (£7.35) was from an unspecified source. While Hoath, Herne and western parts of the Isle of Thanet belonged to the monastery in the Anglo-Saxon period, and remained attached to the church long after 1086, of these only Reculver is mentioned by name in Domesday Book: "[as] the name [Reculver] is used here, it means something larger than the parish but much smaller than the thirteenth-century manor of Reculver. It is fairly sure to have included Hoath ...; it may also have included the adjoining part of Thanet, [including] All Saints ... and St Nicholas-at-Wade ... [The separate manor of Nortone is] Herne ... under another name.") Included in the Domesday account for the manor, as well as the church, farmland, a mill, salt pans and a fishery, are 90 villeins and 25 bordars: these numbers can be multiplied four or five times to account for dependents, as they only represent "adult male heads of households". (Note: The multiplication indicated by Eales would give a peasant population for the whole of the estate centred on Reculver in 1086 of 460–575 people. The mill was probably a watermill, near Brook Farm, and King Eadred's charter of 949 mentions a mill-creek in the area. There are numerous medieval salt working sites in the area to the south and east of Reculver, many of which lie on land belonging to Reculver in the medieval period, for example at TR23316797.) At that time, although Domesday Book records that Reculver belonged to the archbishop of Canterbury in both 1066 and 1086, in reality it must again have been lost to him, since William the Conqueror is recorded as having returned it, among other churches and properties, to the archbishop at his death. (Note: The record states that the king "reddidit ecclesiae Christi omnes fere terras antiquis et modernis temporibus a iure ipsius ecclesiae ablatas ... Haec omnia reddidit ... gratis et sine ullo pretio." ("returned to Christ Church almost all the lands, its by right from ancient and modern times, that had been removed ... He returned all these things ... free and without any remuneration."). Among these, Reculver is listed only by name, while churches elsewhere are identified as monasteries.) In the 13th century Reculver was a parish of "exceptional wealth", and the considerable enlargement of the church building during the Middle Ages indicates that the settlement had become a "thriving township", with "dozens of houses". (Note: Hasted 1800 refers to Reculver as a "borough", but it is not listed as an ancient borough in Beresford, M. & Finberg, H.P.R., English Medieval Boroughs A Hand-List, David & Charles, 1973. However, tithings in Kent were known as "borghs", a word cognate with "borough", but derived from "borh", a "pledge".) In 1310 Archbishop Robert Winchelsey of Canterbury noted that the population of the whole parish in the time of his predecessor John Peckham (c. 1230–1292) had numbered more than 3,000. (Note: Graham 1944, p. 10, gives the figure for the population in the late 13th century as "over a thousand", but the relevant primary source as edited at Duncombe 1784, p. 136, gives it as "trium millium vel amplius" ("three thousand or more") and growing.) For this reason, and because the parish was also large geographically, he converted chapelries at Herne and, on the Isle of Thanet, St Nicholas-at-Wade and Shuart into parishes, though the church at Hoath remained a perpetual curacy belonging to Reculver parish until 1960. Records for the poll tax of 1377 show that there were then 364 individuals of 14 years and above, not including "honest beggars", in the reduced parish of Reculver, who paid a total of £6.1s.4d. (£6.07) towards the tax. (Note: The taxpayers of Hoath were presumably included with those of Reculver, since Hoath is not listed separately. An estimated 5% of the English population was exempt from or evaded the poll tax of 1377. Further, the population of England as a whole declined by about 40% between 1347 and 1377 because of the Black Death.)

=== Decline and loss to the sea ===
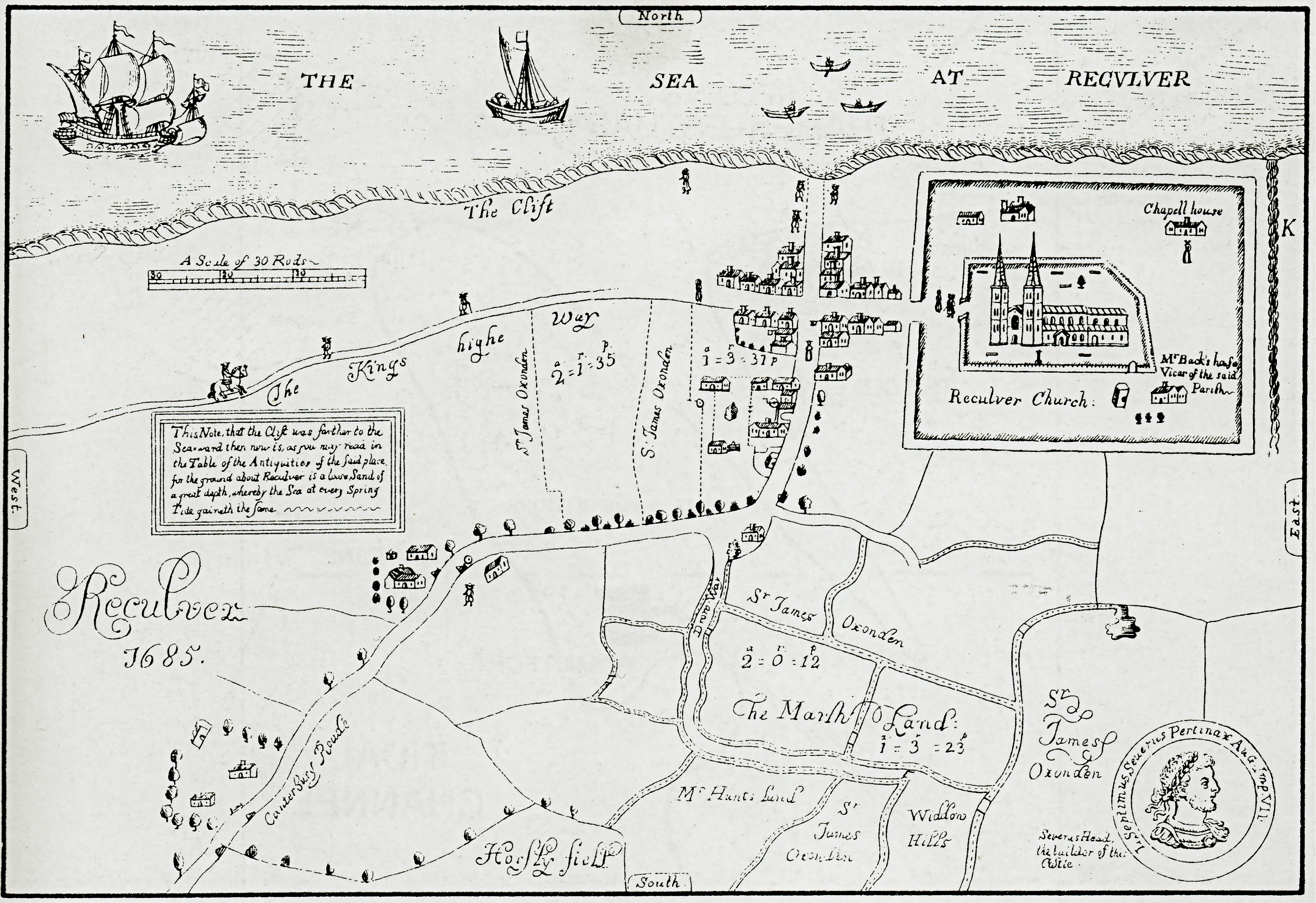
Estate map of Reculver, 1685: the church, the "chapel-house", the Roman fort and the former town of Reculver, described as "Village-lyke" in 1540

The thriving medieval township depended partly on its position on a maritime trade route through the Wantsum Channel, already present in Anglo-Saxon times and exemplified by Reculver's membership of the Cinque Port of Sandwich later in the Middle Ages. The importance of the Wantsum Channel was such that, when the River Thames froze in 1269, trade between Sandwich and London had to be carried out overland. Historical records for the channel are sparse after 1269, perhaps "because the route was so well known as to be taken for granted [in the Middle Ages], the whole waterway from London to Sandwich being occasionally spoken of as the 'Thames'". However, silting and inning closed the channel to trading vessels sailing along it by about 1460 or soon after, and the first bridge was built over it at Sarre in 1485, since ferries could no longer operate reliably across it. (Note: The Gough Map of about 1360 and a map by Thomas Elmham of about 1414 both show the Wantsum Channel as fully open. When the bridge was built "it was stipulated that the arches had to be big enough for boats and lighters to pass, in the hope that 'the water shall happen to increase'". A late-15th century note in the archives of Canterbury Cathedral describes the motivations for, and the provisions of, an act of Parliament that gave permission for the building of the bridge: it states that "[r]ecently the channel has become so silted up that the ferry can no longer cross it, except for an hour during the high spring tides.")

Reculver was also diminished by coastal erosion. By 1540, when John Leland recorded a visit there, the coastline to the north had receded to within little more than a quarter of a mile (400 m) of the "Towne [which] at this tyme [was] but Village lyke". Over thirty years later, in 1576, William Lambarde described Reculver as "poore and simple". In 1588 there were 165 communicants – people taking part in services of holy communion at the church – and in 1640 there were 169, but a map of about 1630 shows that the church then stood only about 500 feet (152 m) from the shore. (Note: Part of this map is illustrated in Dowker 1878b, facing page 8. Its essential features are shown superimposed on an Ordnance Survey map at Jessup 1936, p. 189.) In January 1658 the local justices of the peace were petitioned concerning "encroachments of the sea ... [which had] since Michaelmas last [29 September 1657] encroached on the land near six rods [99 feet (30 m)], and will doubtless do more harm". The village's failure to support two "beer shops" in the 1660s points clearly to a declining population, and the village was mostly abandoned around the end of the 18th century, its residents moving to Hillborough, about 1.25 miles (2 km) south-west of Reculver but within the same parish. (Note: Writing in 1787, John Pridden described the only fare available at Reculver as "dry biscuit, bad ale, sour cheese, or weak moonshine".)

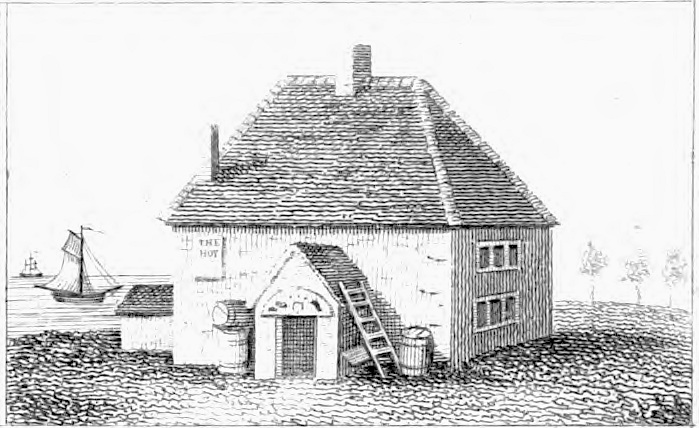
The redundant vicarage at Reculver in use as a temporary replacement for the Hoy and Anchor Inn, in 1809: the original inn stood a short distance north of the church and west of the Roman fort.

Concern about erosion of the cliff on which the church stood, and the possible inundation of the village, had led the commissioners of sewers to install costly sea defences consisting of planking and piling before 1783, when it was reported that the commissioners had adopted a scheme proposed by Sir Thomas Page to protect the church: the sea defences had proven counter-productive, since sea water collected behind them and continued to undermine the cliff. Before this, according to John Duncombe, "the commissioners of sewers, and the occupiers who pay scots, [had] no view nor interest but to secure the level [ground], which must be overflowed when the hill is washed away." By 1787 Reculver had "dwindled into an insignificant village, thinly decked with the cottages of fishermen and smugglers." (Note: In 1821 Reculver was described as a principal station for the "Smuggling Preventive Service". Records of the coast's erosion between about 1540 and 1800 are represented graphically at Gough 2002, p. 205.)

[At about this time,] from the present shore as far as a place called the Black Rock, seen at lowwater mark, where tradition says, a parish church once stood, there [were] found quantities of tiles, bricks, fragments of walls, tesselated pavements, and other marks of a ruinated town, and the household furniture, dress, and equipment of the horses belonging to the inhabitants of it, [were] continually found among the sands ...

— Edward Hasted, The History and Topographical Survey of the County of Kent: Volume 9, 1800 (Note: After a very low tide in 1784, a writer to The Gentleman's Magazine reported that, "the Black Rock (as it is called) being left dry, the foundations of the ancient parish church were discovered, which had not been seen for 40 years before.")

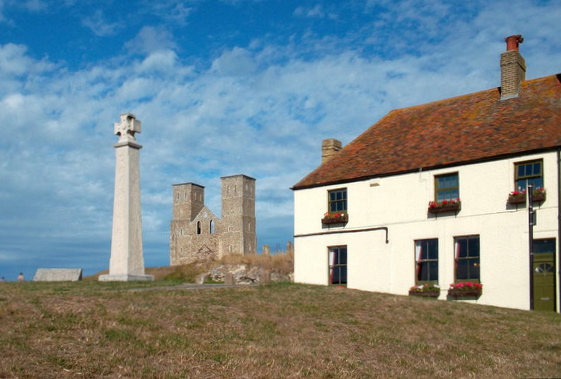
Reculver towers, framed by the Millennium Cross of 2000 and the King Ethelbert Inn

In September 1804 a high tide and strong winds led to the destruction of five houses, one of which was "an ancient building, immediately opposite the public house, and had the appearance of having been part of some monastic erection". The following year, according to a set of notes written by the parish clerk John Brett, "Reculver Church and willage stood in safety", but in 1806 the sea began to encroach on the village, and in 1807 the local farmers dismantled the sea defences, after which "the village became a total [wreck] to the mercy of the sea." (Note: The farmers sold the "sea side stone work ... to the Margate pieor Compney for a foundation for the new pier and the timber by [auction] as It was good oak fit for their [own] use". An advertisement in the Kentish Gazette, Tuesday 7 July 1807, announced that "about 300 sound oak posts" were to be auctioned at Reculver on 16 July by order of the Commissioners for Sewers. A similar advertisement of 12 July 1808 announced an auction of "oak post, and ... a quantity of large stone".)

A further scheme to protect the cliff and church was proposed by John Rennie, but a decision was taken on 12 January 1808 to demolish the church. By March 1809, erosion of the cliff had brought it to within 12 feet (4 m) of the church, and demolition was begun in September that year. (Note: Some sources date the church's demolition to 1805, but a meeting to discuss the building's future was held there on 12 January 1808; a detailed description of the standing church, including pleas for its preservation, was submitted to The Gentleman's Magazine on 3 March 1809; The Gentleman's Magazine reported in 1809 and 1856 that the church's demolition began in September 1809; and the year of the church's demolition is given as 1809 in the archive of Canterbury Cathedral.) Trinity House intervened to ensure that the towers were preserved as a navigational aid, and in 1810 it bought what was left of the structure for £100 and built the first groynes, designed to protect the cliff on which the ruined church stands. The vicarage was abandoned at the same time as the church, or a little later, (Note: In a letter written in March 1809 to The Gentleman's Magazine, but published in September, T. Mot wrote that the vicarage was "one of the most mean structures ever appropriated to such a purpose". Another letter to the same magazine described the vicarage as follows: "[It has] the appearance of some antiquity; it consists of two miserable rooms on the ground floor and a like number above, with no other conveniences or appurtenances of any kind. In fact was it not for the stone porch with which the entrance is decorated, it would pass only for the cottage of a labourer.") and a replacement parish church was built at Hillborough, opening in 1813.

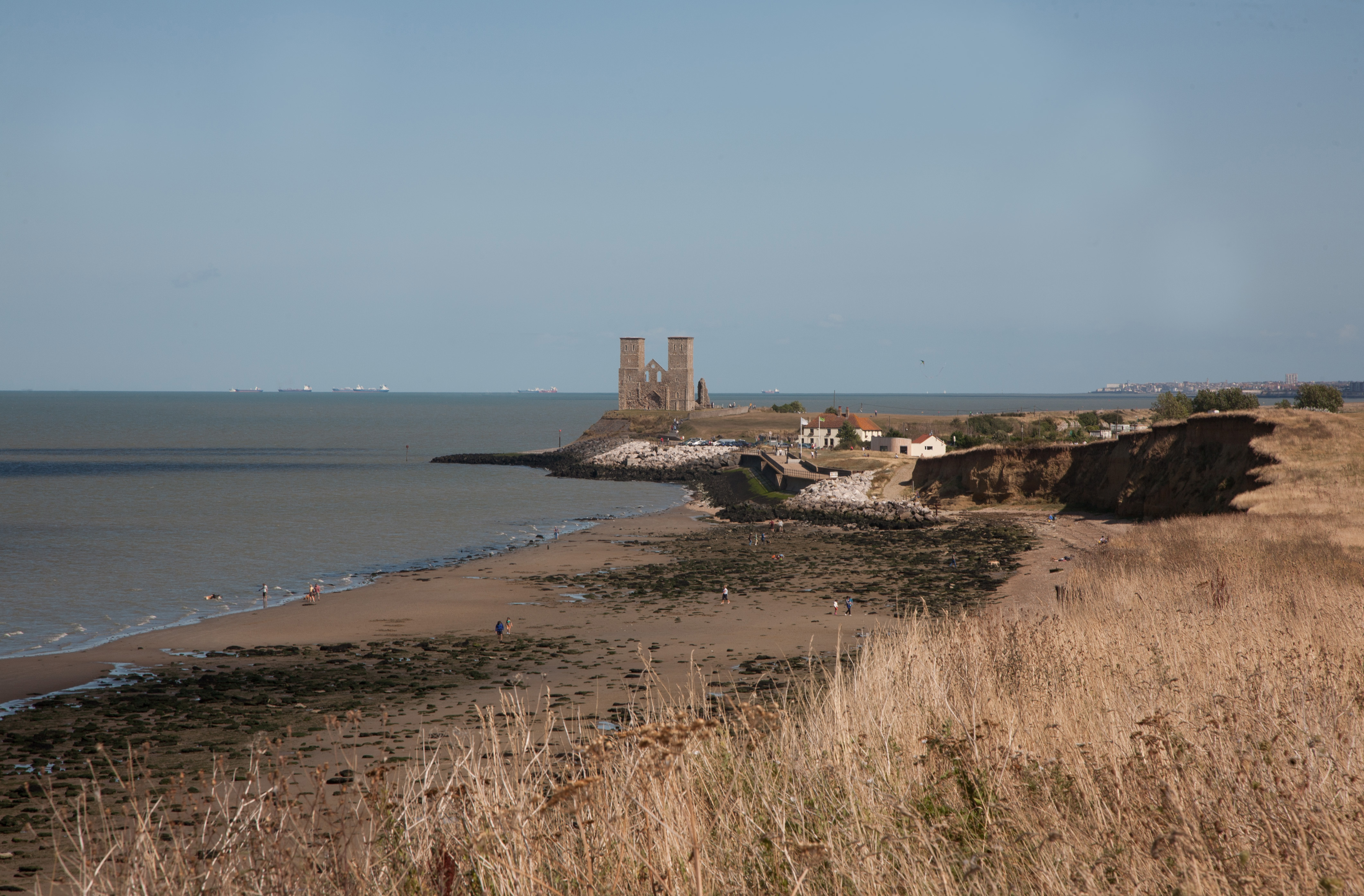
Reculver viewed from the cliff-top in the country park in 2009: until the late 18th century the centre of Reculver village was slightly left of centre in the area shown.

After the sea undermined the foundations of the Hoy and Anchor Inn at Reculver in January 1808, the building was taken down and the redundant vicarage was used as a temporary replacement under the same name. (Note: T. Mot's letter in The Gentleman's Magazine, written in March 1809, ends with the observation that the "jolly landlord revelled with his noisy guests, where late the venerable Vicar smoked his lonely pipe." Another correspondent writing to the same magazine in 1856 reported that this "desecration did not prosper. According to the testimony of some of the present inhabitants of Reculver, nothing went well with the publican: his family was perpetually disturbed by strange noises and pranks ... and he was eventually obliged to retire, a ruined man.") Although it was reported in 1800 that there were then only five or six houses left in the village, a new Hoy and Anchor Inn was built by 1809, and this was renamed as the King Ethelbert Inn by 1838. (Note: According to Harold Gough, writing in 2001 or earlier, "on the entrance door [of the King Ethelbert Inn were] the words 'Hoy and Anchor Bar'". The sign for the Hoy and Anchor Inn was reported as hanging in the King Ethelbert Inn in 1871, and as being in the Herne Bay Club in 1911. The proprietor of the King Ethelbert Inn in about 1870 was John Holman, who published a short guide to Reculver, in which the inn was commended for its "eggs and ham, and Margate ale", and was advertised as providing accommodation for tourists. Letters addressed to a Mr Holman and a Mrs Holman in 1862 and 1869 respectively were found in the inn in 1999. A John Holman was a farmer at Reculver in 1877 and 1878. The existence of two other public houses at Reculver was reported at different times in the 19th century, namely the Cliff Cottage in 1869, and the Pig and Whistle in 1883.) Further construction work is indicated by a stone over the doorway to the inn bearing a date of 1843, and it was later extended into the form in which it stands today, "probably ... in 1883". (Note: A travel guide of 1865 described "the Ethelbert's Arms" as "a quaint little hostelry, where the visitor will meet with perhaps rude fare, but with certainly the most civil attention." The King Ethelbert public house has protected status as a locally listed building.)

Today the site of the church, including the upper part of the sea defences there, is managed by English Heritage, and the village has all but disappeared. (Note: Reculver is listed as a "possible deserted medieval village" (DMV) in the Kent Historic Environment Record. The main sea defences around Reculver are maintained by the Environment Agency.) The present appearance of the cliff below the church, a grassy slope above a large stone apron, was the work of central government and was in place by April 1867. In 2000 the surviving fragments of an early medieval cross that once stood inside the old church were used to design a Millennium Cross to commemorate two thousand years of Christianity. This stands at the entrance to the car park and was commissioned by Canterbury City Council.

=== Bouncing bombs ===
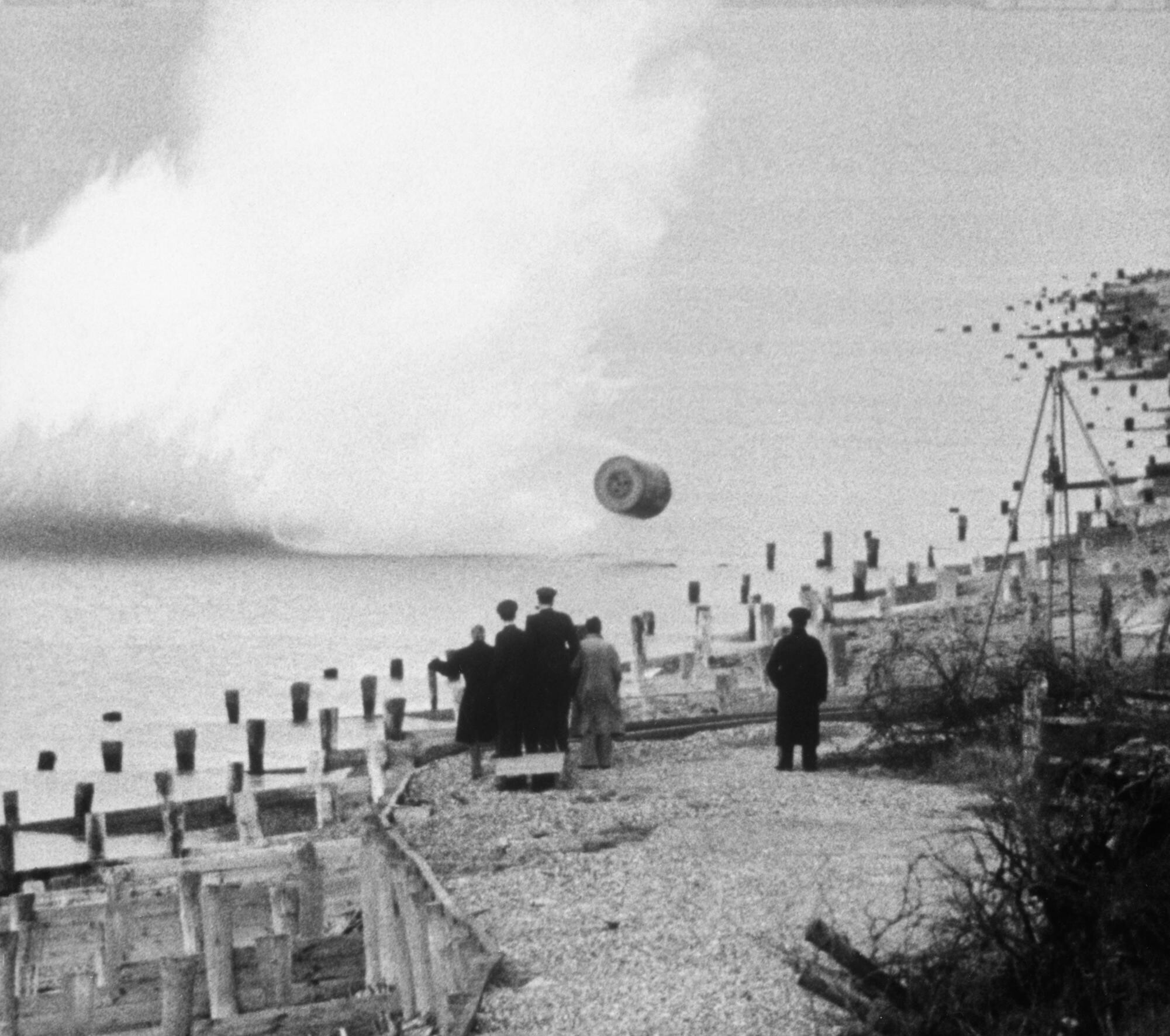
Barnes Wallis and others watching a Dambusters bouncing bomb prototype strike the shoreline at Reculver, 1943

During the Second World War, the coastline east of the village was used to test prototypes of Barnes Wallis's bouncing bomb. This area was chosen for its seclusion, while the clear landmark of the church towers and the ease of recovering prototypes from the shallow water were probably also factors. (Note: The shoreline at Reculver had been put to a similar use by the Royal Artillery in 1805.) Different, inert versions of the bomb were tested at Reculver, leading to the development of the operational version known as "Upkeep". This bomb was used by the RAF's 617 Squadron in Operation Chastise, otherwise known as the Dambuster raids, in which dams in the Ruhr district of Germany were attacked on the night of 16–17 May 1943 by formations of Lancaster bombers. On 17 May 2003 a Lancaster bomber overflew the Reculver testing site to commemorate the 60th anniversary of the exploit.

Two prototype bouncing bombs, about 6 feet (2 m) long and 3 feet (1 m) wide, lay in marshland behind the sea wall until about 1977, when they were removed by the Army. Other prototypes were recovered from the shoreline in 1997, one of which is in Herne Bay Museum and Gallery, a little over 3 miles (5 km) west of Reculver. Others are on display in Dover Castle and in the Spitfire & Hurricane Memorial Museum at the former RAF Manston, on the Isle of Thanet. Part of an inert Upkeep bomb, consisting mostly of a circular end with some of its filling still adhering, was uncovered during beach maintenance work undertaken at Reculver by the Environment Agency on 29 March 2017.

== Governance ==
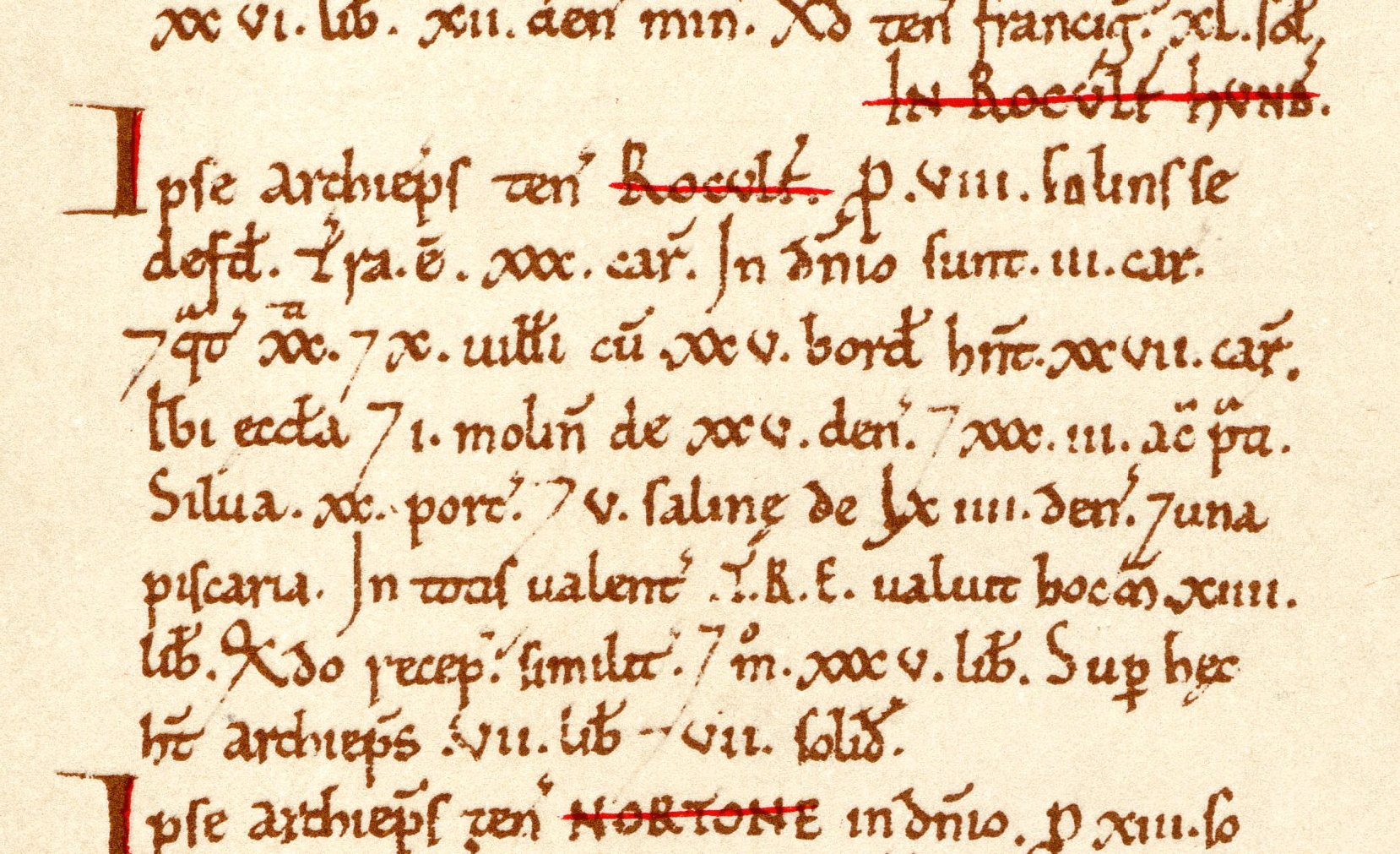
The Domesday Book entry for Reculver, given here as "Roculf", in 1086: the entry below it, headed "Nortone", is for "Herne ... under another name".

In the 10th-century charter by which King Eadred gave Reculver to the archbishops of Canterbury, the boundary of the mainland part of the estate was about the same as those for the adjoining parishes of Reculver, Hoath and Herne in the 20th century, and the estate included part of the Isle of Thanet. (Note: References such as "S 546" indicate the number given to an Anglo-Saxon charter in Sawyer 1968. Details, Latin texts and English translations of charters referenced by Sawyer number in this article can be found through the list at "Browsing charters". The Electronic Sawyer. King's College London. 2014. A map of the mainland part of the estate is at Gough 1992, Fig. 10.) In 1086, Domesday Book named Reculver as a hundred, meaning that it was probably the meeting-place for the local hundred court. The hundred included Hoath and Herne, and it may also have included the neighbouring area of Thanet. In 1274–75 the local hundred was much larger: it was then named after Bleangate, in a detached part of Chislet parish, and was divided into northern and southern halves; it also included part of Thanet. (Note: Bleangate is about 7.4 miles (11.9 km) south-west of Reculver, at OS grid reference TR167645. In 1274–75 the jury for Bleangate hundred said that half of the hundred was in the hands of the Archbishop of Canterbury, and the other half was in the hands of the abbot of St Augustine's, but that "they [did] not know from what time". Bleangate hundred may have been in existence at the time of Domesday Book although not referenced by it, and if so probably included the Domesday hundreds of Chislet, Sturry and Reculver in 1086 as it did in the 13th century.) By 1540 Bleangate hundred no longer included land on Thanet, its members being listed then as Sturry, Chislet, Reculver and Herne for the archaic taxes known as "fifteenths and tenths", (Note: All the members of Bleangate hundred were assessed at the same rate of £12.14s. (£12.70) for the two fifteenths and tenths granted to Elizabeth I in 1571 except for Herne, which was assessed at £12.15s (£12.75). While Sarre on the Isle of Thanet had been included in Bleangate hundred in 1274–75, by 1540 it was in Ringslow hundred, which consisted entirely of places on the Isle of Thanet.) and in 1659 they were listed as Chislet, Herne, Hoath, Reculver, Stourmouth, Sturry and Westbere. In 1808 the members of the northern half-hundred, or "Bleangate Upper", were listed as Herne, Reculver, Stourmouth and Hoath. The constable for the northern half-hundred was chosen at the court leet of the manor of Reculver, which by 1800 was usually held at Herne. (Note: The election of a "Constable of the Half Hundred of Bleangate" named Cob as sidesman for Reculver church was reported in 1596: he refused this duty on the grounds that he was too busy in his role as constable, and was supported in this claim by a letter from the "Worshipful" Mr Peter Manwood. In 1835 the court baron was also held at Herne.)

The parish was represented by two tithings – known in Kent as "borghs" – in the Hundred Rolls of 1274–75 and, 400 years later, for the purposes of the Hearth Tax, levied between 1662 and 1689. In 1274–75 they appear as Reculver borgh and Brookgate borgh; in 1663 they appear as Reculver Street borgh and Brookgate borgh, which were recorded under a parish heading for Reculver, together with Hoath borgh; and in 1673 Reculver borgh and Brookgate borgh were recorded under a heading for Herne parish, while Hoath was recorded under its own parish heading. However, borghs in Kent, and tithings generally, were related to the manorial and hundredal administration of a county, rather than to the ecclesiastical parishes in which they lay.

The parishes of Herne and, on the Isle of Thanet, St Nicholas-at-Wade were created from parts of Reculver parish in 1310, although they continued to have a subordinate relationship with their original parish into the 19th century, while Hoath remained a perpetual curacy into the 20th. Thereafter Reculver's parish boundary, enclosing an area of about 2 square miles (5 km^{2}), remained the same for both ecclesiastical and civil purposes until 1934, and included the settlements of Hillborough, Bishopstone and Brook, now Brook Farm. The parish extended west almost to Beltinge, in Herne parish, and to Broomfield in the south-west, where the boundary with Herne parish ran along the centre of the main thoroughfare, now Margate Road; it was bounded in open country on the south-east and east by the parish of Chislet. (Note: For the historical parish boundary see Vision of Britain (2009). "Reculver AP/CP". University of Portsmouth et al. Boundary Map of Reculver AP/CP. For the current ecclesiastical parish boundary, see achurchnearyou.com (2014). "Parish Boundary (06BLK121)". Google Maps.) On 1 April 1934 the civil parish was abolished and merged with of Herne Bay. In 1931 the civil parish had a population of 829.

Reculver is in an electoral ward of the same name that includes Beltinge, Bishopstone, Brook Farm, Boyden Gate, Chislet, Hillborough, Hoath and Maypole. The ward is in the local government district of Canterbury and has one seat on Canterbury City Council; in the local elections of 2019, the seat was won by Rachel Lois Carnac, Conservative. At the national level Reculver is in the English parliamentary constituency of Herne Bay and Sandwich. Sir Roger Gale (Conservative) has been MP for the area since 1983.

== Geography ==
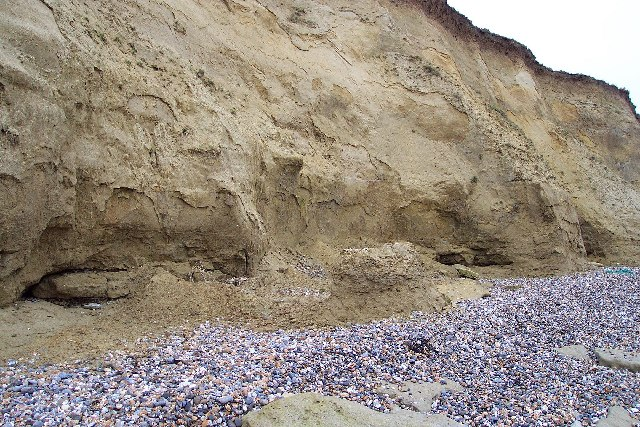
The soft sandstones of the cliffs fronting Reculver country park are easily undercut by the sea. Shingle in the area is composed of small pebbles washed out of the cliff, augmented to the east by shingle dredged off the coast of East Anglia. (Note: "[A]longshore transport rates are low [between Bishopstone Glen and Reculver]. Apart from along the eastern end of the section where there is a weak east to west transport, there does not appear to be a strong drift in either direction.")

The ruins of the Roman fort and medieval church at Reculver stand on the remnant of a promontory, a low hill with a maximum height of 50 feet (15 m), which is the "last seaward extension of the Blean Hills." Sediments laid down around 55 million years ago are particularly well displayed in the cliffs to the west. Nearby Herne Bay is the type section for the upper part of the Thanet Formation, previously known as the Thanet Beds, consisting of a fine-grained sand that can be clayey and glauconitic and is of Thanetian (late Paleocene) age. It rests unconformably on the Chalk Group, and forms the base of the cliffs in the Reculver and Herne Bay area. (Note: Ward 1978, p. iv, Fig. 1, gives the location of the section of cliff illustrated there as being at Ordnance Survey grid reference "TQ 2140 6902": this location is in New Malden in south-west London, whereas TR 2140 6902 is a location on the cliff between Bishopstone and Reculver. Compare also the grid references given at Ward 1978, pp. 4–5.) Above the Thanet Sand are the Upnor Formation, a medium sandstone, and the sandy clays of the Harwich Formation at the Paleocene–Eocene boundary. The highest cliffs, rising to a maximum height of about 115 feet (35 m) to the west of Reculver, have a cap of London Clay, a fine silty clay of Eocene age. The surface consists mainly of flint gravel with some areas of brickearth, both of which are glacial deposits.

Rocks such as these are easily washed away by the sea. It has been estimated that the Roman fort was originally about 1 mile (1.6 km) from the sea to the north, but the cliffs are eroding at a rate of approximately 3.3 feet (1 m) per year. Coastal erosion had washed away most of Reculver village by 1800, leading residents to re-locate to Hillborough, within Reculver parish. A plan is in place to manage this erosion whereby some parts of the coastline such as the country park will be allowed to continue eroding, and others – including the site of the Roman fort and the medieval church – will be protected from further erosion. New sea defences were built in the 1990s, including covering the beaches around the church with boulders.

The warmest time of year in Kent is in July and August, with average maximum temperatures of around 21 °C (70 °F), and the coolest is in January and February, with average minimum temperatures of around 1 °C (34 °F). Average maximum and minimum temperatures are about 0.5 °C (0.3 °F) higher than they are nationally. Locations on the north coast of Kent, like Reculver, are sometimes warmer than areas further inland, owing to the influence of the North Downs to the south. Average annual rainfall in Kent is about 728 millimetres (28.7 in), with the highest rainfall from October to January. This is lower than the national average annual rainfall of 838 millimetres (33 in). Occasional drought conditions can lead to the imposition of Temporary Use Bans to conserve water supplies, and it was announced in 2013 that a water desalination plant was to be built at Reculver to increase supplies.

== Demography ==
In the census of 1801 the number of people present in the parish of Reculver, enclosing an area of about 2 square miles (5 km^{2}) and including the settlements of Hillborough, Bishopstone and part of Broomfield, was given as 252, and this figure remained roughly stable until the 20th century when a dramatic increase was recorded: in the census of 1931, the number was given as 829 but this included holidaymakers, and in 2005 the number of people at Reculver was estimated to increase to "over 1,000 at the height of the [summer] holiday season". (Note: The form for the 1931 census specified that the presence of "visitors" should be recorded; visitors should also give their usual postal address.)

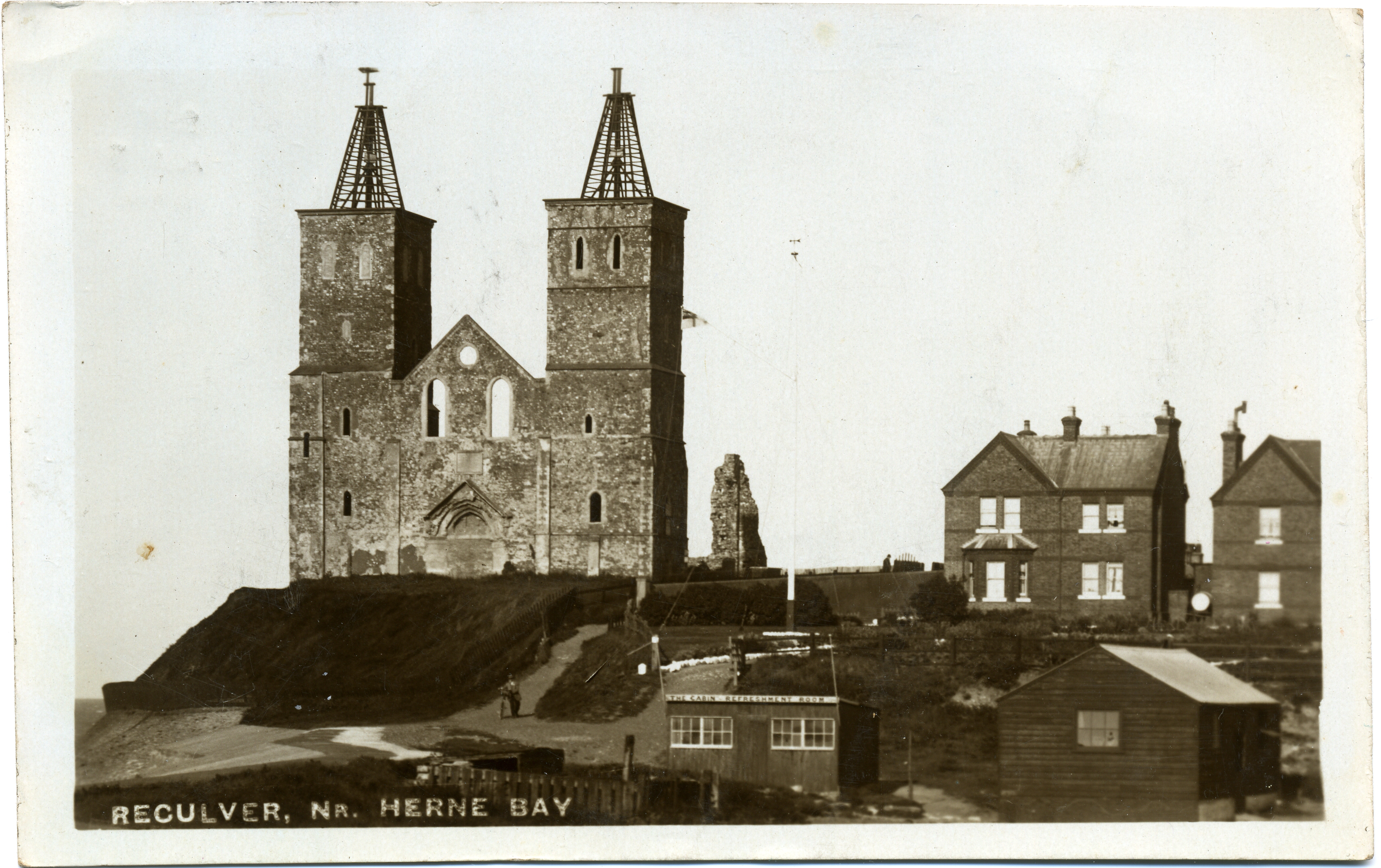
Postcard of Reculver from 1913, with a tourist café in the foreground

In the 2001 census, conducted on 29 April, the relevant census area covered 2.79 square miles (7 km^{2}) and included only Reculver and outlying farms and houses, in which 135 people were found, almost a quarter of whom were in caravans. All were born in the United Kingdom except for three individuals from the Republic of Ireland and three from South Africa. Gender was given as 69 female and 66 male, and the age distribution was 12 individuals aged 0–5 years (8.8%), 16 aged 6–16 years (14%), 30 aged 17–35 years (22.2%), 14 aged 36–45 years (10.3%), 44 aged 46–64 years (32.5%) and 21 aged 65 years and over (15.5%). Half (67) of all the individuals recorded were described as economically active, with 58 of these having employers and nine being self-employed; none were recorded as full-time students or unemployed. Twenty-four people (17.7%) were described as retired. Of those aged 16–74 years, 14 (12.8%) were placed at the highest level for education or qualification. Christianity was the only religion represented, by 99 individuals, with 22 recorded as having no religion and 14 whose religion was not stated. From April 2001 to March 2002 the average gross weekly income of households in the electoral ward of Reculver was estimated by the Office for National Statistics as £560, or £29,120 per year; this was below the average for the south-east of England, excluding London, which was £660, or £34,320.

In the 2011 census the relevant census area was identical to the electoral ward, an area of 3.55 square miles (9 km^{2}), and produced information for the area as a whole. Therefore, while the total resident population of the ward at the 2011 census numbered 8,845, detailed information comparable to that of the 2001 census is unavailable.

== Economy ==
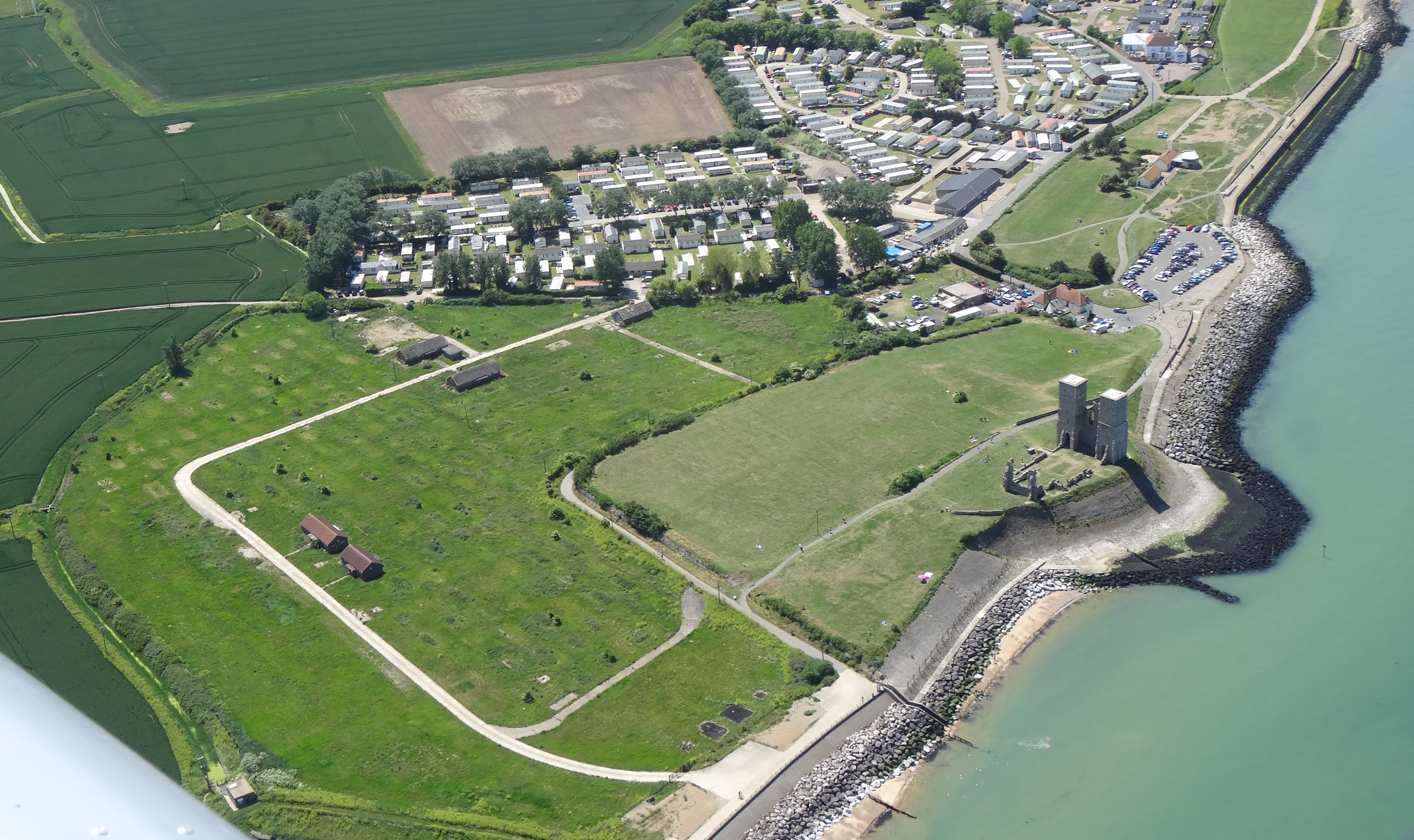
Aerial view of Reculver looking west by south at 600 feet (183 m) in June 2015: the mown, sub-rectangular area of grass around the church ruins marks the remaining interior of the Roman fort. The untended area to its immediate left was a park for static caravans until about 2015.

In the Middle Ages Reculver was one of several members, or "limbs", of the Cinque Port of Sandwich: possibly originating in a loose association in the 11th century, this status was first recorded in about 1300. Like other limbs at Fordwich, Deal, Sarre and Stonar, it was then involved in maritime trade, and it shared in the Cinque Ports' duty to supply ships and men for the king's use, in return for concessions such as tax exemption. The last surviving record of Reculver as a limb of Sandwich dates from 1377, and its name is absent from Cinque Port records of 1432, probably because of "drastic coastal erosion, and the consequent silting up of the Wantsum Channel between Sarre and the North Mouth [adjacent to Reculver]." In 1220 King Henry III granted the archbishop of Canterbury a market to be held weekly at Reculver on Thursdays, and an annual fair was held there on Saint Giles's Day, 1 September. (Note: William Lambarde, writing in 1576, gave the day of the fair as "7.Septemb. being the Nativitie of the blessed virgine Marie", to whom the church at Reculver was dedicated. The fair continued in the 17th century, when yeoman "David Amberton of Chislet sent horses [and wheat] ... to Reculver for sale".)

Oysters from the "Rutupian shore" – the shoreline around Richborough, a little over 8 miles (13 km) to the south-east – were noted as a delicacy by the 1st–2nd-century Roman poet Juvenal, and in 1576 oysters from Reculver itself were "reputed as farre to passe those of Whitstaple, as Whitstaple doe surmount the rest of this shyre [of Kent] in savorie saltnesse." An enclosed area of salt water known as the Dene was leased for the breeding of oysters and lobsters in 1867; as of 2014 there is a hatchery for oysters in saltwater ponds on the eastern side of Reculver belonging to a seafood company that is based there. In May 1914, Anglo-Westphalian Kent Coalfield Ltd drilled a borehole at Reculver in search of coal, since it had found a seam of coal 48 feet (14.6 m) thick at nearby Chislet and was developing a colliery there; possible samples of coal were retrieved from the borehole at a depth of 1,129 feet (344.1 m), but it was abandoned, no workable seam having been found.

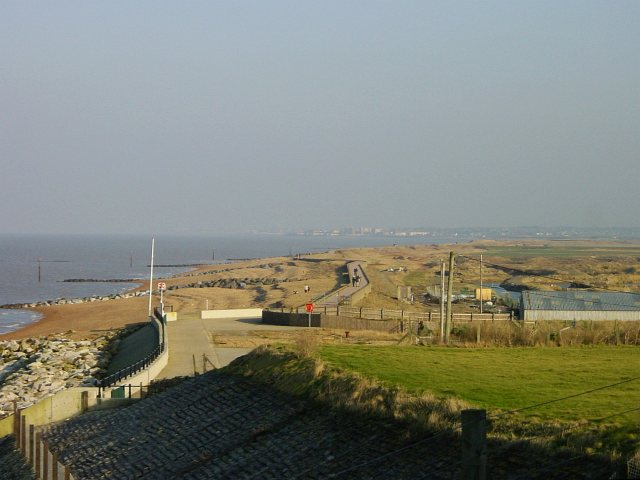
Looking east across the mouth of the former Wantsum Channel, from Reculver churchyard: an oyster hatchery is to the right. Margate is on the horizon.

Today Reculver is dominated by static caravan parks, the first of which appeared after the Second World War. (Note: "Shortly after World War II a caravan site was established below the church which has since grown so large that much imagination is now required to conjure up the majesty of its former setting." A 1953 image of the ruins at Reculver surrounded by caravans is at Canterbury City Council 2008, p. 7.) Also present are a country park, the King Ethelbert public house, which is a free house, and a nearby shop and cafe. Reculver was defined as a "key heritage area" in 2008, and there are plans for its development as a destination for green tourism. (Note: "Reculver's role in the region wide development of East Kent as a green tourism destination is central to [Natural East Kent]'s work. The objective is to create access to good connections across the region for walkers and cyclists, to provide good interpretation of natural and heritage assets and to support the private sector to provide good quality accommodation.") Canterbury City Council's Reculver Masterplan, adopted in 2009, envisaged the creation of 100 touring pitches in its caravan park, south-east of the Roman fort, which was then leased to the Camping and Caravanning Club. That caravan park was closed by 2015, when Canterbury City Council undertook a consultation on its incorporation into the country park.

=== Community facilities ===
Reculver Church of England Primary School is adjacent to the church at Hillborough. The school's site also hosts Beltinge Day Nursery and Reculver Breakfast and Afterschool Club. The nearest school for older children is Herne Bay High School.

The nearest post office is in Beltinge, about 1.9 miles (3.1 km) to the west-southwest. The nearest general practitioner (GP) surgery is about 1.4 miles (2.3 km) to the south-west, between Bishopstone and Hillborough, with others in Beltinge, Herne Bay, Broomfield and St Nicholas-at-Wade. While the nearest general hospital is the Queen Victoria Memorial Hospital, about 2.5 miles (4 km) to the west in Herne Bay, the closest hospital with an Accident and Emergency (A&E) department is the Queen Elizabeth The Queen Mother Hospital, about 8.2 miles (13.2 km) to the east in Margate. The nearest community centre is Reculver and Beltinge Memorial Hall, about 1.9 miles (3.1 km) to the west-southwest.

== Landmarks ==
=== Ruined church of St Mary ===
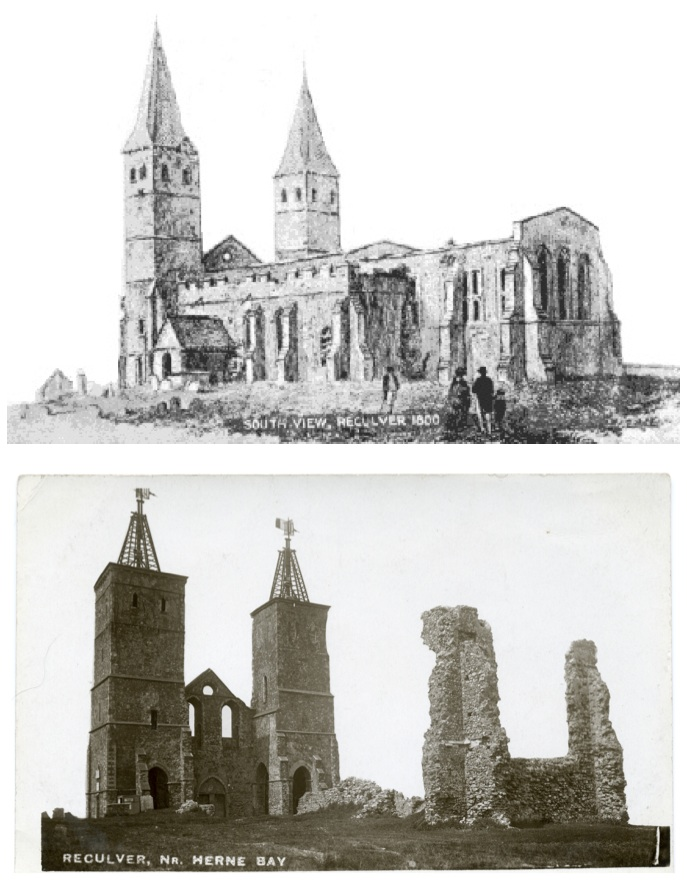
Reculver church near intact in 1800 (above), and in ruins in the early 1900s (below)

The medieval towers of the ruined church of St Mary are Reculver's "most dominant features". They were added in the late 12th century to a church founded in 669, when King Ecgberht of Kent granted land to Bassa the priest for the foundation of a monastery. The church was sited near the centre of the Roman fort, and was built "almost completely from demolished Roman structures". In 692 the monastery's abbot Berhtwald was elected archbishop of Canterbury, and King Eadberht II of Kent was buried inside the church in the 760s. (Note: In her 2004 entry for Æthelberht II in the Oxford Dictionary of National Biography, Susan Kelly wrote that Eadberht I of Kent was buried at Reculver "in 748". However, in Kelly 2008, she observes that there is "a much better context" for this royal burial to have been of Eadberht II, who "faded from view c. 763 x 764". The royal tomb at Reculver was "in a position corresponding to the south porticus (at St Augustine's kings were buried in the south porticus); an inscription or other record identifying [the occupant] as King Eadberht (grand-)son of King Æthelberht may have given rise to the later belief that it was the earlier King Æthelberht himself that was buried [at Reculver].") The church building was considerably enlarged over time, the last additions being made in the 15th century. (Note: Ground plans showing the development of the church from the 7th century to the 15th are at Wilmott 2012, pp. 24–5. The towers had been topped with spires by 1414, and the north tower held a ring of bells. One of these was reported sold in 1606, and in 1683 it was reported that the existing ring of bells, which were cast in 1635 by Joseph Hatch, was in need of repair. Four bells were reported present by Francis Green, vicar of Reculver from 1695 to 1716.) but it retained many prominent Anglo-Saxon features, including a triple chancel arch and a stone high cross, though this had been removed by 1784. (Note: The cross probably stood until the English Reformation, when it was "presumably destroyed by sixteenth-century iconoclasts [after which] nothing more is recorded of it.")

The church was demolished in 1809, in what has been described as "an act of vandalism for which there can be few parallels even in the blackest records of the nineteenth century". Archaeological excavations in the 19th and 20th centuries established the building sequence of the church, and areas of missing wall are marked on the ground by concrete edged with flint. The ruins are now in the care of English Heritage. The sea defences protecting them were installed by Trinity House in 1810, but are now maintained by the Environment Agency. Fragments of the stone cross, and two stone columns that had been part of the church's triple chancel arch, are on display in Canterbury Cathedral. (Note: An aerial view of the ruins is at Witney 1982, Plate 8.)

A byname for the towers is the "Twin Sisters", and an account of how this first arose was current about a hundred years after its supposed happening in the late 15th century, but in its usual form, for example in a 19th-century travel guide, it is mostly an invention created around "pseudo-historical detail". (Note: The byname is also found as "The Sisters" and the "Two Sisters", but the towers are also sometimes known as simply "The Reculvers".) The Ingoldsby Legends includes a re-invention of the story in which two brothers, Robert and Richard de Birchington, are substituted for the two sisters. Clive Aslet used the byname in noting that, in Ian Fleming's James Bond novel Goldfinger, the villain Auric Goldfinger "lived at Reculver".

=== Country park ===
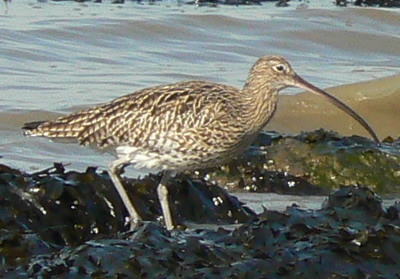
Eurasian curlew at Reculver, 2007

Reculver Country Park is a nature reserve managed by Canterbury City Council and the Kent Wildlife Trust. It covers 64 acres (26 ha) and comprises a narrow strip of protected, cliff-top land about 1.5 miles (2 km) long, running from the remaining enclosure of the Roman fort west to Bishopstone Glen. Most of the cliff-top and all of the foreshore in this area are included in the Thanet Coast SSSI, the Thanet Coast and Sandwich Bay SPA and the similarly named Ramsar site; most of the Country Park is also part of the Bishopstone Cliffs local nature reserve, which covers 166.5 acres (67.4 ha) of the coastline between Beltinge and Reculver. In winter brent geese and wading birds such as sanderlings and turnstones may be seen; during the summer months the largest colony of sand martins in Kent nests in the soft cliffs, on top of which fulmars were also reported to have begun nesting in 2013, and wading curlews may be seen at any time. The grasslands on the cliff top are among the few remaining cliff-top wildflower meadows left in Kent, and are home to butterflies and skylarks. Also present are the nationally scarce hog's fennel and two species of digger wasp, Alysson lunicornis and Ectemnius ruficornis. (Note: A list of "Species of Principal Importance" in the country park, and the results of a 2006 Buglife survey of winged insects found there, are at Canterbury City Council 2012, pp. 21–6. For more on the wildlife, see Matthews.) The coastline here forms part of the "key on-land Palaeocene site in the London Basin", and is the only location in the Woolwich Beds to contain wood. The foreshore displays a "rich invertebrate and vertebrate fossil fauna ... and the section has been extensively studied over many years." The park first won a Green Flag Award in 2005, and it is estimated that over 200,000 people visit it each year, including up to 3,500 students for educational trips. Canterbury City Council's Reculver Masterplan envisages purchasing farmland to the south of the country park to replace land lost to the sea through coastal erosion.

In 2011 it was found that the shoreline in the Herne Bay area, including Reculver, had come under threat from an invasive species, the carpet sea squirt (Didemnum vexillum), also known as "marine vomit". First recorded in UK waters in 2008, the carpet sea squirt is indigenous to the sea around Japan, but it has been carried to other parts of the world, including New Zealand and the US, on boat hulls, fishing equipment and floating seaweed. Carpet sea squirt can overgrow other, sessile species, "potentially smothering species living in gravel and affecting fisheries." (Note: Carpet sea squirt is classified as an "alert species", and the public are requested to "report any sightings as soon as possible.")

=== Centre for renewable energy ===
A visitor centre in Reculver Country Park re-opened in 2009 as the Reculver Renewable Energy and Interpretation Centre, "marking 200 years of the moving of Reculver village". (Note: There is no record of the settlement of Reculver being moved to a new site: rather, "the gradual erosion of the coastline meant that [Reculver's] residents began to abandon it, moving instead to Hillborough [within the same parish]." An Ordnance Survey map of 1885 has the place-name "Reculver" against the location of the church at Hillborough, as does a map of 1903, but these do not reflect common usage: compare a map of 1805, other 19th- and 20th-century maps, and current OS maps at grid reference TR225692.) The centre features a log burner fuelled by logs from the Blean woodland, solar and photovoltaic panels provide electrical power, and there are displays describing the history, geography and wildlife of the area.

== Transport ==
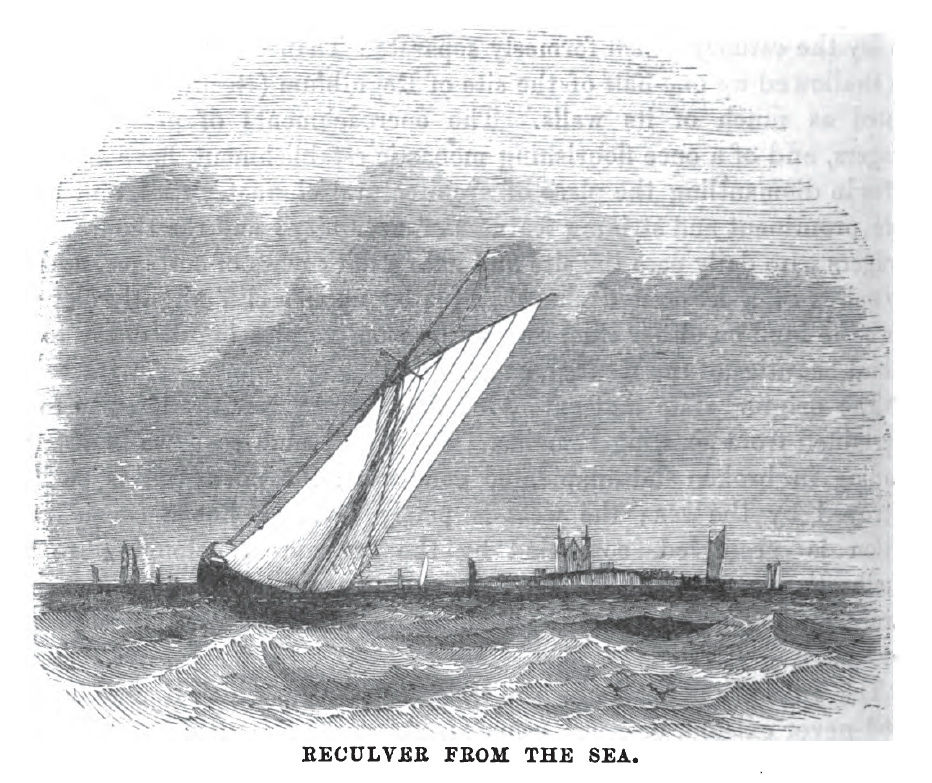
Reculver from the sea: All About Margate and Herne Bay, 1865

Reculver is at the end of an unclassified road, Reculver Lane, and is about 2 miles (3.2 km) by road from the nearest major junction of the A299, or Thanet Way. From Roman times there was a connection to Canterbury by road, the presence of which is reflected in parish boundaries for much of its length. (Note: "[A] road that is now hard to trace ran from Canterbury to Reculver; its course may have been via Fordwich (there is now a footpath from Fordwich to Canterbury that may represent it), where the Stour was crossed, Buckwell, Maypole [in the civil parish of Hoath], and Hillborough to Reculver. It would not have been impossible for the Romans to have constructed a road between Richborough and Reculver, but it would have been an enormous task and scarcely worth the trouble; the only practicable route would have been by way of Chislet, Upstreet, and Grove on the banks of the Wantsum Channel, and then at least three waterways would have had to be negotiated.") An estate map of 1685 shows the Reculver end of this road as "The King's highe Way", which may have been in use until 1875, when it was reported that a public road had been diverted because of a cliff fall near Love Street Farm. (Note: Love Street farmhouse, now occupied by the Blue Dolphin Club, is at Ordnance Survey grid reference TR22406915, and is shown on the 1877 Ordnance Survey 1:10,560 scale (6 inch/mile) County Series map of Kent.) Remains of a Roman road leading to the east gate of the fort have also been found, which were "substantial ... consisting of a sandstone platform [10–13 feet (3–4 m)] wide and at least [11 inches (30 cm)] deep."

In 1817 the nearest access to transport by coach was at Upstreet, about 4 miles (6.4 km) south of Reculver, which lay on a route that ran between London, Canterbury and the Isle of Thanet. In 1839 coaches and vans ran daily from Herne Bay to Canterbury and on to destinations on the southern and eastern coasts of Kent, with access to the English Channel, at Deal, Dover, Sandgate and Hythe. In 1865 transport from Herne Bay was available by "fly" – a type of one-horse hackney carriage. Today, bus services calling at a stop adjacent to the King Ethelbert Inn connect Reculver with Herne Bay, Canterbury, Birchington and Margate.

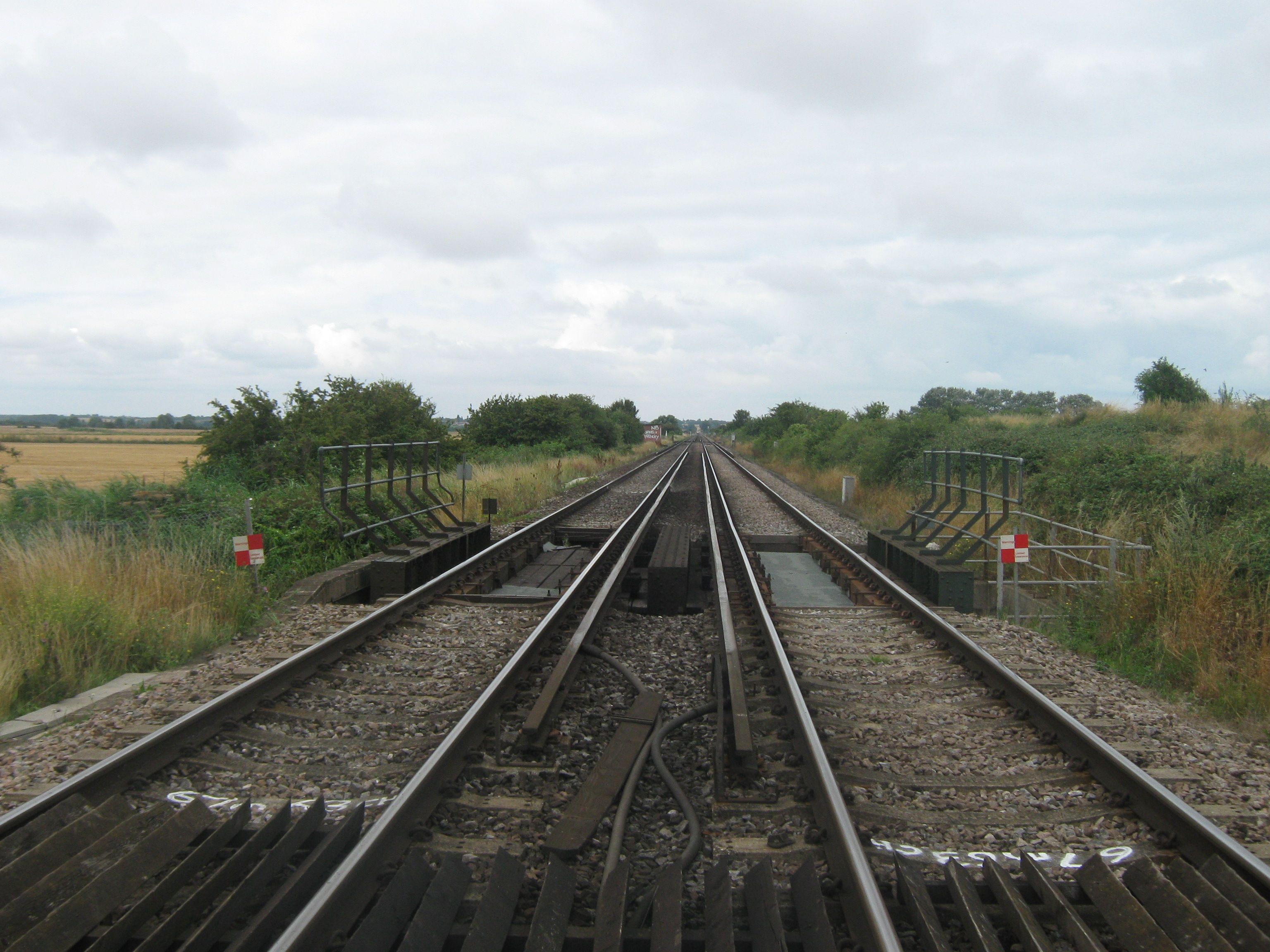
The Chatham Main Line in 2010, looking west: here the railway crosses a bridge over the River Wantsum, about 1.6 miles (2.6 km) south by east from Reculver.

The nearest railway stations are at Herne Bay, about 3.8 miles (6.1 km) to the west, and Birchington-on-Sea, about 4.5 miles (7.2 km) to the east. Both stations are on the Chatham Main Line, running between London's Victoria station and Ramsgate, on the south-eastern coast of the Isle of Thanet. The railway first reached Herne Bay from the west in 1861 and was extended to Ramsgate Harbour railway station by 1863, but no provision was made for public access from Reculver, although purchase of land for a station there had been envisaged and a short-lived goods station was opened in 1864. In the same year a passenger station was proposed for Reculver, primarily to serve tourists, but it was not built. In 1884 the South Eastern Railway proposed building a branch line from its station at Grove Ferry on the Ashford to Ramsgate line to join the London, Chatham and Dover Railway's Chatham Main Line at Reculver, thereby linking Canterbury and Herne Bay. The Canterbury and Kent Coast Railway Bill was presented to a select committee of MPs in January 1885: the London, Chatham and Dover Railway objected to it, particularly the junction with their main line at Reculver, so the Bill was rejected and the line was not built. Rudimentary houses were erected by the East Kent Railway company on nearby marshland in 1858 for the navvies who constructed the line through the area; these had been taken over by enginemen of the South Eastern and Chatham Railway by October 1904, when they were replaced by cottages.

There is no provision for access to Reculver from the sea, but there were maritime connections from at least the 1st century, when the Roman fort of Regulbium had a supporting harbour. The quantity and variety of coins found at Reculver dating from the 7th century to the 8th are almost certainly related to its location on a major trade route through the Wantsum Channel; there was probably still a harbour in Anglo-Saxon times, and the monastery may well have operated a "fleet of ships and its own boatyard." Details in the 10th-century charter in which King Eadred gave Reculver to the archbishops of Canterbury suggest that there was then an island immediately to the north, creating a "mini-Wantsum [Channel that] could have provided a sheltered channel for beaching and berthing ships"; the present day Black Rock beyond the shoreline may be a remnant of this island.

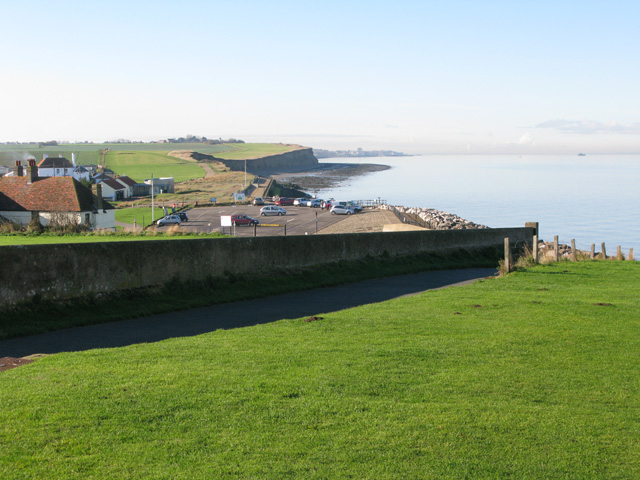
Looking west from Reculver churchyard in 2012: in medieval times a harbour lay in the area of sea to the right. The King Ethelbert Inn, built and extended in the 19th century, is on the left; the bus stop is adjacent.

In the 17th century an inlet to the north-west was described as "anciently for a harber of ships, called now The Old Pen". In the 18th century there was a place for landing passengers and goods at the village, and the former name of the King Ethelbert Inn, the "Hoy and Anchor", makes reference to hoys, a local type of merchant sailing vessel. These continued to serve the coastline of northern Kent in the mid-19th century. In 1810 a canal was proposed to run from the coast between Reculver and St Nicholas-at-Wade to Canterbury, with a harbour for sea-going vessels at the northern end, which would be accessible from Reculver by a new road beginning at the inn, but none of this was built. (Note: By 1810 the inn at Reculver was located where the King Ethelbert Inn now stands, though it was then named as the "Anchor" in a notice regarding the proposed canal.) Passenger steamships called at Herne Bay pier on their route between London and destinations along the north coast of Kent from 1832, but this service ceased in the first half of the 20th century. A travel guide of 1865 advised that

[the] best way to visit Reculver from Margate is by means of a sailing or rowing boat ... [although] Herne Bay is by far the most convenient place to get to Reculver from, as you can be rowed to the foot of the twin towers in little more than half an hour ... [after which] we run the boat on the beach, and plant our foot on the famous "Rutupian shore," sung by Juvenal ...

— All About Margate and Herne Bay, 1865

Coastguards were stationed at Reculver from the mid-19th century until they were withdrawn in the mid-20th century, but the towers of the ruined church remain a landmark for mariners, both practically and through their use to mark the division between areas covered by Thames Maritime Rescue Coordination Centre (MRCC) and Dover MRCC.

== Religion ==
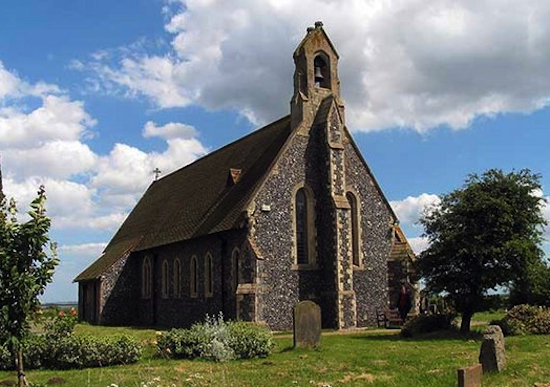
Reculver parish church of St Mary the Virgin, Hillborough, built in 1876

Early in the 19th century a new Anglican parish church was built at Hillborough, about 1.25 miles (2 km) south-west of Reculver, as a replacement for the old church of St Mary. The new church was given the same dedication to St Mary and, standing on a plot of land bought for £30, it was consecrated on 13 April 1813. A "miserable little [church] ... built in a rough and poverty-stricken style", it had a leaking roof and was already decaying by 1874, and was replaced by the present structure, begun in 1876 and consecrated on 12 June 1878.

The church begun in 1876 was designed in the Gothic Revival style by the architect Joseph Clarke, who was surveyor for the diocese of Canterbury at the time. It has seating for about 100 people, and is a "simple and relatively plain building", though it incorporates stonework from the old church at Reculver. (Note: "The [south] doorway is a 13th-century one reused from the ancient church at Reculver and has a multi-moulded arch and keeled nook-shafts with simple foliage capitals ... A few stones from the ancient church of Reculver have been reused [in the interior], for example at the junction of the nave and chancel ... Some 17th-century memorial slabs from the old church are set into the floor.") The medieval baptismal font in the church is probably from the former chapel of All Saints, Shuart, on the Isle of Thanet, which was demolished in the 15th century. (Note: The font "was rescued from a state of neglect, and kindly presented to the church by John Rammell, Esq., of Shuart, St Nicholas", in 1878.) A war memorial stands at the northern edge of the churchyard, facing into the adjacent Reculver Lane, and records the names of 27 parishioners who died fighting in the First World War and the Second World War.

== Notable people ==
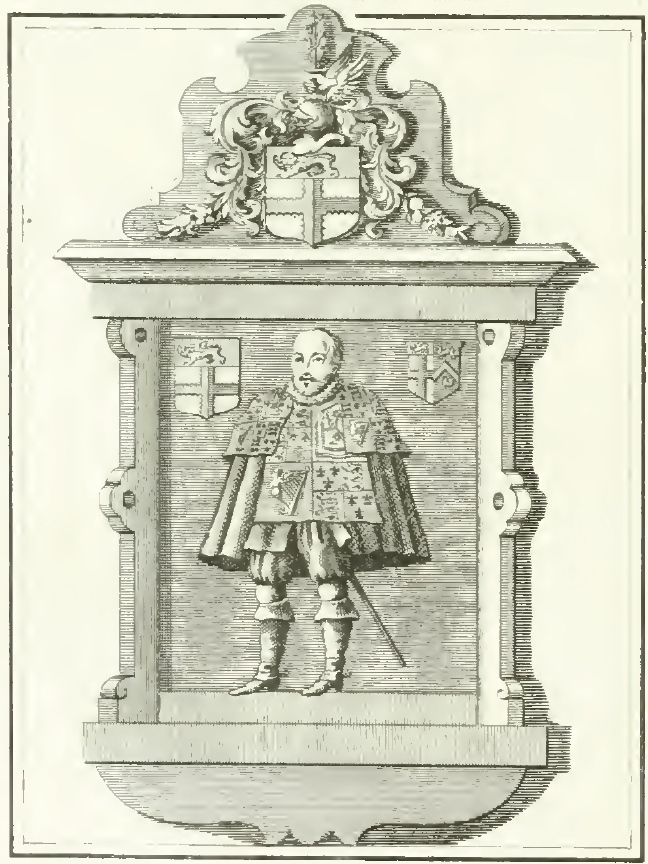
Ralph Brooke's monument in the chancel at St Mary's Church, Reculver, engraved in 1784

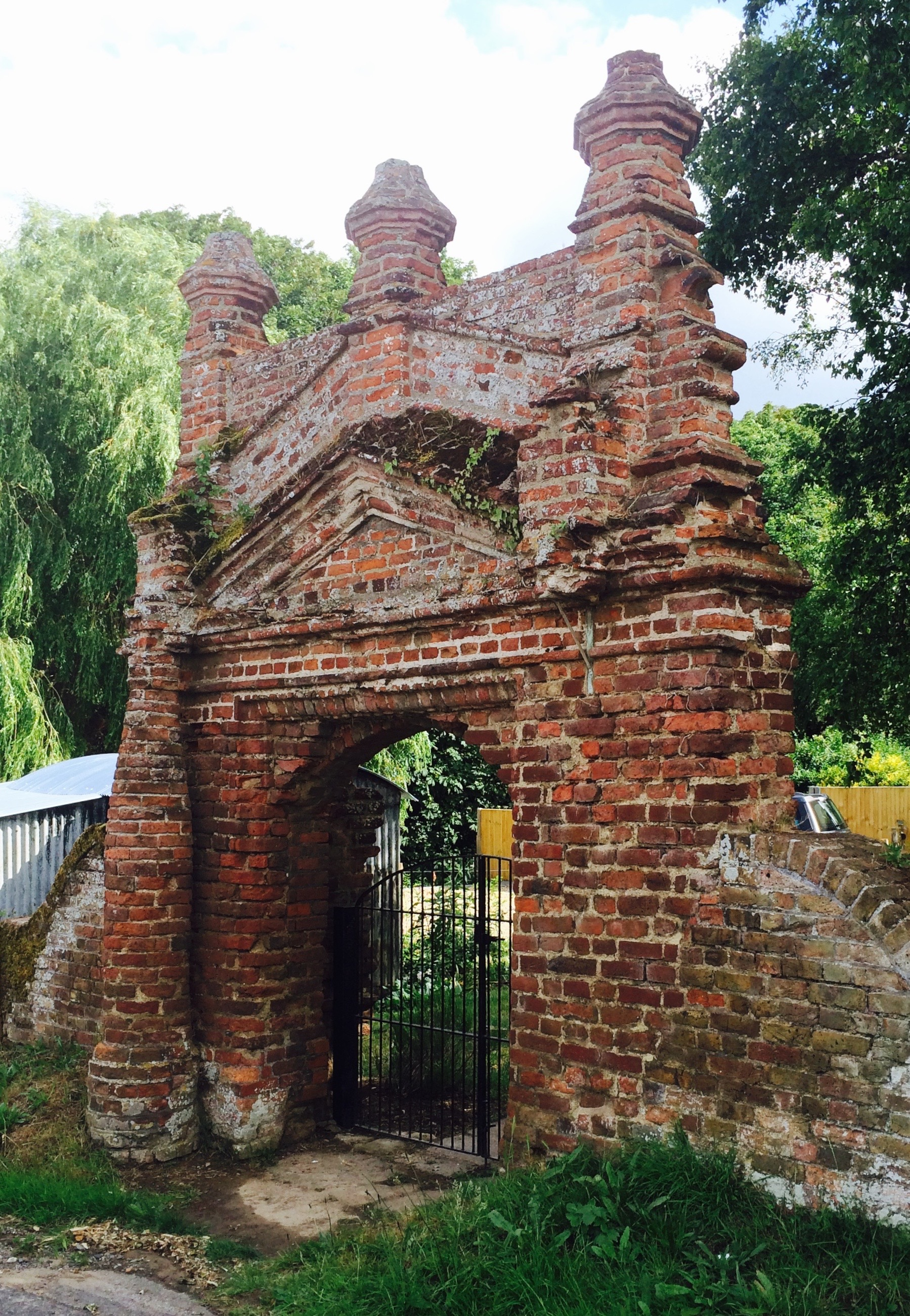
Elizabethan brick gateway near Reculver, a remnant of the home of Sir Cavalliero Maycote, in 2015

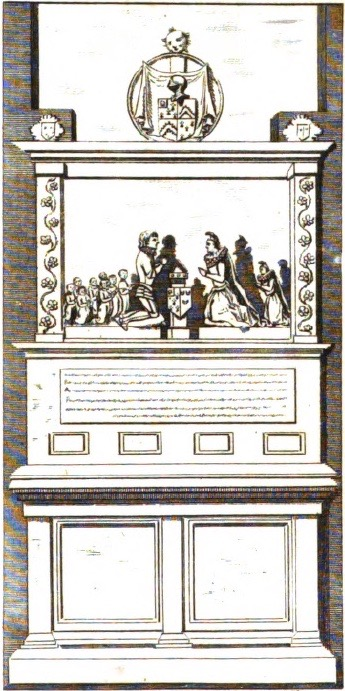
The Maycote monument in the chancel at St Mary's Church, Reculver, engraved in 1784

King Eadberht II of Kent was buried in the church at Reculver in the 760s. His tomb was in the south porticus of the church, adjacent to the chancel: this porticus later became part of the church's south aisle. (Note: Pridden 1787, p. 171 & Plate XI, indicates the location of the royal tomb, and includes a plan of the church which shows the north and south porticus as separate rooms: Freeman 1810, pp. 40–1, effectively reports that both porticus, or chapels, had been completely sealed up, and observes that any surviving royal tomb must have been enclosed within the southern one.) This was traditionally believed to be the tomb of King Æthelberht I of Kent, and was "of an antique form, mounted with two spires". (Note: The tomb was still in existence in 1604, when a report of recent damage to it was made to the archdeacon of Canterbury.) John Langton, a chancellor under the kings Edward I and Edward II, was also a rector of Reculver, as was Simon of Faversham, a 14th-century philosopher and theologian: he was given the position but was forced to defend it to the Pope, and died in France, either on his way to the papal curia in Avignon or after his arrival, some time before 19 July 1306.

The first recorded owner of Brook, about 0.8 miles (1 km) south-southwest of Reculver, was Nicholas Tingewick, physician to King Edward I and rector of Reculver until 1310, when he became its first recorded vicar. (Note: "The house was anciently of considerable local importance, was called Helborough (the modern Hillborough) ... and it eventually came into the possession of the family of Masters, from whose former house of Brooke, near Ash [about 3 miles (5 km) west of Sandwich], it is said to have assumed its present name.") He was regarded as the "best doctor for the king's health", and there are more records of his medical practice than there are for "most physicians of his time." (Note: In 1918 it was reported that a seal matrix had been discovered in the previous year "just to the south-east of the ruined church." The seal matrix dates to the early 14th century, and bears the inscription "S[igillum] Vicarii de Reiculvre", or "Seal of the Vicar of Reculver". It was probably created in connection with the grant of the peculiar status of rural dean to Nicholas Tingewick in 1325.) Brook subsequently passed to James de la Pine, sheriff of Kent in the early 1350s. (Note: Kilburne 1659, p. 392, lists "James le Pine" as sheriff of Kent in the 26th and 28th years of the reign of Edward III; Duncombe 1784, p. 78, mentions "James de la Pine, who was sheriff of Kent 26 and 27 Edward III"; Hasted 1797, pp. 177–213, lists "James de la Pine" as sheriff of Kent for part of the 26th and 27th years of the reign of Edward III. This king's regnal years began on 25 January: in the Gregorian calendar in use today, his 26th year ran from 25 January 1352 to 24 January 1353, his 27th from 25 January 1353 to 24 January 1354 and his 28th from 25 January 1354 to 24 January 1355. Regarding the sheriff's family name, Hasted 1800, pp. 109–25, states that this was "de la Pine, as they were at first written".) His grandson sold it to an ancestor of Henry Cheyne, who was elected knight of the shire for Kent in 1563, and was created "Lord Cheyney" in 1572. He had sold all of his possessions in Kent by 1574 to "finance his extravagance", and Brook subsequently became the property of Sir Cavalliero Maycote, who was a leading courtier to Elizabeth I and James I. He had a "handsome monument [on the south wall of the chancel in the church at Reculver] representing Sir Cavalliero and Lady Maycote, with their nine children, all in alabaster figures, kneeling". (Note: The Maycote monument is illustrated at Pridden 1787, Plate X, fig. 4. A letter dated 7 May 1595 from Archbishop John Whitgift of Canterbury giving his permission for Sir Cavalliero to create a vault for his family in the chancel at Reculver is printed at Hussey 1902, p. 44. The existence of a large, circular vault at the east end of the chancel, containing coffins arranged in a circle, was reported in 1878 by George Dowker, who made excavations in the church; further excavations in 1927 revealed steps leading down to the vault. The date of Sir Cavalliero's death was omitted from his monument, but he was recorded as living in 1618. A monumental brass in the church at Hoath records the death of Sir Cavalliero's paternal grandparents, Antony and Agnes Maycot, in 1532. Several other memorials in the old church at Reculver are also described in Pridden 1787, pp. 166–9.) Brook is now Brook Farm, where there is a remnant of Maycote's home in the form of a gateway, which is a "very rustic Elizabethan affair", all of brick, with mouldings. (Note: The gateway at Brook Farm is a scheduled monument. "The present aspect of the gateway is not in accordance with its builder's intention, since the brickwork seems originally to have been covered with stucco." It can be viewed from the adjacent road, Brook Lane, and is mapped as a historic feature at OS grid reference TR22026810.)

Thomas Broke, alderman and MP for Calais in the mid-16th century, may have been a son of Thomas Brooke of Reculver, as well as being a "religious radical". Ralph Brooke, officer of arms as Rouge Croix Pursuivant and York Herald under Elizabeth I and James I, died in 1625 and was buried inside the church, where he was commemorated by a black marble tablet on the south wall of the chancel, showing him dressed in his herald's coat. (Note: Brooke's monument in Reculver church is illustrated at Duncombe 1784, Plate 2, and was described by John Pridden in 1787 as "much ruined".)

Robert Hunt, vicar of Reculver from 1595 to 1602, became minister of religion to the English colonial settlement at Jamestown, Virginia, sailing there in the ship Susan Constant in 1606, and celebrated probably "the first known service of holy communion in what is today the United States of America on 21 June 1607." Barnabas Knell was vicar from 1602 to 1646: during the English Civil War his son Paul Knell, born in about 1615, was chaplain to a regiment of Royalist cuirassiers, to whom he preached a sermon, "The convoy of a Christian", at the siege of Gloucester in August 1643. (Note: Barnabas Knell "'proved himself a pugnacious, litigious and aggressive character, ... thoroughly upsetting his flock at Reculver and Hoath, [and] being "presented" to the Archdeacon of Canterbury by the churchwardens on a number of occasions.' ... He clung on to his post until 6 October 1646, when he was fired by the Committee for Plundered Ministers for 'swearing, observing ceremonies and, in sermons and otherwise, expressing malignancy against (Cromwell's) Parliament'.") An estate map of 1685 shows that much of the land around Reculver then belonged to James Oxenden, who spent much of his life as an MP for Kent constituencies between 1679 and 1702.

== In popular culture ==
Author Russell Hoban repurposes Reculver as "Reakys Over" in his 1980, post apocalyptic novel Riddley Walker.

"Reculver" is the first song on musician Patrick Wolf's album Crying the Neck. Themes in the song include duality, mirroring "Reculver’s twin towers near Herne Bay."
