= Ford Palace =

Ruined palace in England

Coordinates: 51.3478°N 1.1671°E

Location of Ford Palace in Kent

Ford Palace was a residence of the Archbishops of Canterbury at Ford, about 6.6 miles (10.6 km) north-east of Canterbury and 2.6 miles (4.2 km) south-east of Herne Bay, in the parish of Hoath in the county of Kent in south-eastern England. The earliest structural evidence for the palace dates it to about 1300, and the earliest written references to it date to the 14th century. However, its site may have been in use for similar purposes since the Anglo-Saxon period, and it may have been the earliest such residence outside Canterbury.

Archbishop John Morton (1486–1500) rebuilt the palace, adding a five-storey tower of brick, and Thomas Cranmer was visited there by King Henry VIII in 1544. In 1573 Archbishop Matthew Parker proposed to demolish it, but it survived to be surveyed in 1647 by commissioners acting on the instructions of the Long Parliament, which had acquired it from the Church of England. The survey found the palace to be in fair condition, but it was largely demolished and the materials sold by order of Parliament in 1658, while the see of Canterbury was vacant. Its site was returned to the Church after the Restoration. In 1661, what remained of it was described as so ruined that its chapel was in use as a barn.

== Toponymy ==
"Ford" is a common place-name element in England, and refers to a shallow crossing of a river or stream. In this instance it refers to a location about 160 yards (146 m) south-west of the site of Ford Palace, where a stream was crossed by a Roman road between Canterbury and Reculver.

== History ==
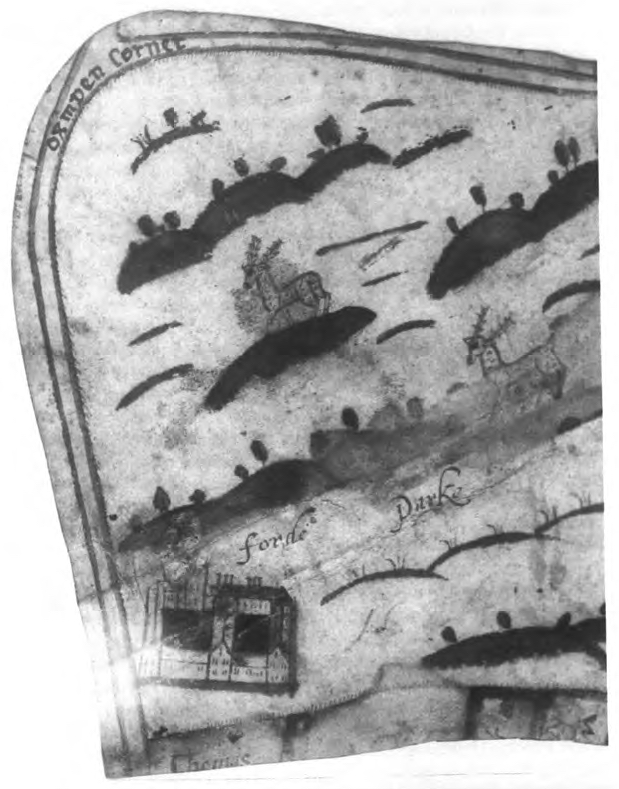
Manuscript map showing Ford Palace and Park, possibly drawn in 1624: north is at the top. (Note: The road junction marked at the top of the map as "Oxinden Corner" is marked as "Oxenden Corner" on OS maps at TR2054766317.)

=== Origin ===
The earliest evidence of human occupation in the vicinity of Ford consists of two Lower Palaeolithic hand axes found on a hilltop about 550 yards (503 m) to the south-south-west of the site of Ford Palace, across the stream from the crossing of which the place takes its name, and on the opposite, western side of the Roman road between Canterbury and Reculver. Five 2nd-century, Roman cremation burials were found near the same location. A fragment of a Roman inscription and a number of Roman coins have been found on the site of the palace, and, about 330 yards (302 m) to the south, in a field on the eastern side of the Roman road and also south of the stream, cropmarks have been observed indicating the probable site of a Roman villa. Finds from the Anglo-Saxon period include a claw beaker and a drinking cup retrieved from a sand pit also to the south of the stream, between the site of Ford Palace and that of the cremation burials.

Antiquarians such as the 18th-century clergyman John Duncombe believed that King Æthelberht of Kent moved his royal court from Canterbury to Reculver – about 2.6 miles (4.2 km) north-east of Ford – in about 597, and built a palace on the site of the Roman ruins there. However, archaeological excavation has shown no evidence of this, and Æthelberht's connection with Reculver may be no more than a product of legend. In 2001 the historian Harold Gough noted speculation that the king may instead have taken up residence at Ford, since it lay on the Roman road between Canterbury and Reculver, and was included in the estate centred on Reculver that was given by King Ecgberht of Kent to Bassa the mass-priest for the foundation of St Mary's Church, Reculver, in 669. (Note: A nearby spring was reported in the 19th century to be named "St Ethelburga's Well", presumably after Æthelburh of Kent, who, according to Bede, returned to Kent from Northumbria in about 633 with Paulinus of York and a thegn named Bassus: he may have been identical with Bassa the mass-priest. A location on the boundary of the Reculver estate, at the northern mouth of the Wantsum Channel, was recorded as "Eanflaedmutha" in 949, perhaps after Æthelburh's daughter Eanflæd. Gough suggested that Æthelburh may have lived at Ford, and remarked that, if so, it is "as though [Eanflæd's] brief residence from childhood to marriage had become imprinted on the local geography." Further, Ruth Kozodoy noted that the earliest known record of the tradition connecting Reculver with Æthelberht is in the writings of Thomas Sprott, a monk of St Augustine's Abbey, Canterbury, in the 13th century, and observed that "the fact that no glorification of Sprott's own monastic establishment stood to be gained by associating [Æthelberht] with Reculver argues against this detail being pure fabrication.") Ford was also included in the Reculver estate when King Eadred gave it to Archbishop Oda of Canterbury in 949. In 1800 the historian Edward Hasted wrote that Ford Palace "appears to have been the most antient palace, excepting that of Canterbury, which had been erected for the archiepiscopal residence", described it as "parcel of the antient possessions of the see of Canterbury", and placed its establishment "probably on lands given to [the archiepiscopate] sometime before the Norman conquest". Gough noted further that there is not "a shred of documentary or archaeological evidence" for the palace's existence in the Anglo-Saxon period.

The first indication of the existence of an archiepiscopal residence at Ford is in documents issued there in the 14th and 15th centuries. (Note: An example is an appeal (Appellatio) issued by Archbishop Henry Chichele on 22 March 1428: the date is given as "M. CCCC. XXVII. ... mensis ... Martii die 22", but at that time the year was reckoned to begin in England on Lady Day, 25 March.) However, part of the main structure that stood until 1964 "embodied a string-course scroll moulding which suggested a late-Decorated date of around 1300", and there may have been an earlier, moated site adjacent to the palace's southern side. (Note: Sources vary in their definition of the residence, mainly calling it either a palace or a manor house. While Parliamentary commissioners described it in 1647 as a "mansion house", an archiepiscopal official visiting it in 1661 referred to it as a palace, as did John Pridden in 1787 and Edward Hasted in 1800. In 1904 the historian Arthur Hussey referred to it as a manor house, as did the historian Harold Gough in 2001. The surveyor B.J. Bennett did likewise in 1933, adding that it is "sometimes inaccurately styled 'Palace'", without expanding on why this is inaccurate. In 1872, Walter Hook wrote, in effect, that only the archbishops' residences at Canterbury and Lambeth were palaces. However, in 1976 Cecil Hewett and Tim Tatton-Brown, both specialists in historic buildings, referred to the residence at Ford as a palace; and Historic England's listing for "Ford Manor Farmhouse" states that it "incorporates part of the late mediaeval gatehouse of the Palace of the Archbishops of Canterbury.")

=== Archbishop Morton ===
Although no relevant documentation survives, a major phase of construction work at Ford Palace is attributed to Archbishop John Morton (1479 – 1500). Hasted believed that Morton "almost rebuilt the whole of [the palace]", and the architectural historians Cecil Hewett and Tim Tatton-Brown, in discussing bricks used in the tower known as "Bell Harry" at Canterbury Cathedral between 1494 and 1497, compared them to those found at Ford, where they wrote that Morton "built himself a palace." Morton instigated a great deal of building-work during his clerical career, to the extent that he obtained a royal commission to press-gang stonemasons, bricklayers and other construction workers into his service. But Gough remarked that any building-work attributed to him at Ford would probably consist of brick. Ford Manor farmhouse includes brick- and stonework of varying dates, among them remains of the palace's gatehouse; a section of brick wall from the palace's garden also survives. Other parts of the palace complex considered to be Morton's work include a five-storey brick accommodation tower, of which nothing remains above ground, and a stable block: the site of the stables is now occupied by a barn, parts of which are of early Tudor date. (Note: Archbishop William Warham (1503 – 1532), the third archbishop after Morton, "spent no less than £30,000 in repairing and beautifying the different episcopal homes of the see [of Canterbury]".)

=== Archbishop Cranmer ===
Gough wrote that Archbishop Thomas Cranmer (1533 – 1555) "seems to have been particularly attached to [Ford Palace], ... [involving it] inextricably with the progress of the English Reformation." He was at the palace in 1535 when he wrote to King Henry VIII concerning the prior of Blackfriars, Canterbury, who had objected to his preaching against the Pope, and in 1536, when he wrote to Thomas Cromwell regarding a question of consanguinity. The year after, Cranmer left Lambeth Palace for Ford to escape an instance of plague, having concluded a meeting of bishops that had been deliberating on the text of the "Bishops' Book", which was to become the basis for the Thirty-Nine Articles of Religion. In August the same year he was at Ford when he received copies of the Matthew Bible from the printer Richard Grafton, and he wrote from there to commend it to Thomas Cromwell. In 1538 he appointed Nicholas Ridley, with whom he became one of the Oxford Martyrs in 1555, to the neighbouring vicarage of Herne. In the summer of 1552 he was at Croydon Palace with Ridley, working on the Forty-Two Articles of Religion, but withdrew to Ford in October suffering from a fever. On 24 November, still at Ford, he dispatched a version of the Articles that he had reviewed and annotated to the Privy Council. Evidently Cranmer viewed Ford Palace as "a retreat from the unhealthy atmosphere of the London area, near enough to Canterbury without actually being in the city, where religion and politics sometimes formed a dangerous mixture"; and it was at the palace, in June 1544, that Cranmer received a visit from King Henry, who was on his way from London to France. The King stayed there overnight, before continuing to Dover. But, during the English Counter-Reformation under Queen Mary I, it was also at Ford Palace that Cranmer received orders to appear before the Privy Council, leading to his execution in 1556.

=== Decline and demolition ===
The first archbishop of Canterbury after the Elizabethan Religious Settlement of 1559, Matthew Parker (1559 –1575), disliked Ford Palace to the extent that he wanted it partly demolished, and the residences at Bekesbourne and Canterbury to benefit from the spoils. Parker's plan was to retain sufficient buildings for the keeper of the park at Ford, which was part of the palace estate and extended to about 166 acres (67 ha), and only to maintain the manor as necessary for occasional visits by the archbishop. The estate was leased to the keeper as a farm, but, seeking Queen Elizabeth I's authority for a major change to the buildings, Parker wrote to the then Lord High Treasurer, William Cecil, in March 1573, describing Ford Palace as "an old, decayed, wasteful, unwholesome, and desolate house". (Note: Parker regarded Ford as "in such a corner, and the soil such, as he thought no man would have any delight to dwell there". In 1800, Hasted described the parish of Hoath, which includes Ford, as "situated in a lonely unfrequented country, both unwholesome and unpleasant".) The matter remained undecided when Parker died in May 1575.

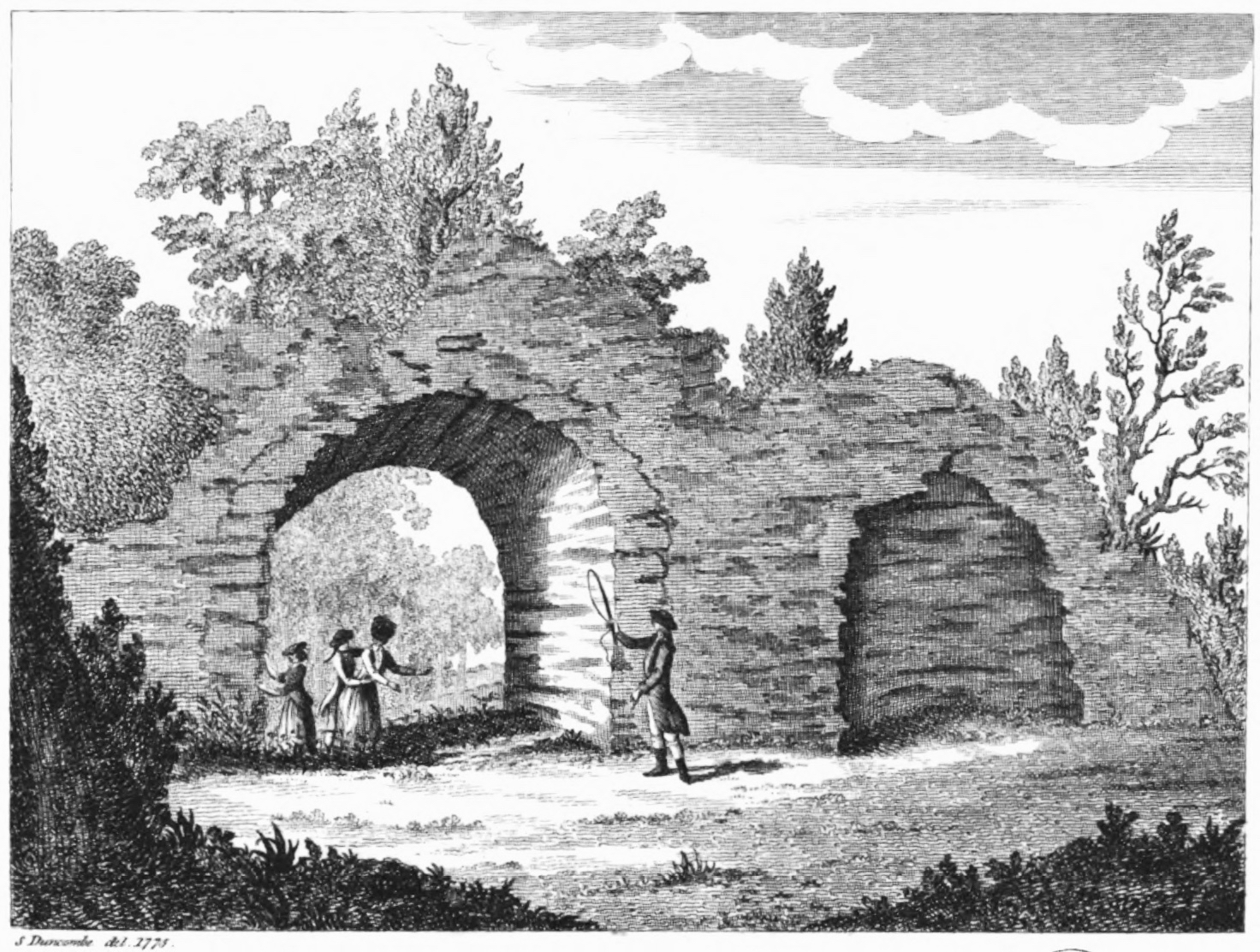
Part of the ruins of Ford Palace in 1775

Hasted and Hook believed that Archbishop John Whitgift (1583 – 1604) hunted frequently in Ford Park, but Gough demurred, stating that the belief is not supported by any evidence. Archbishop George Abbot (1611 – 1633), who accidentally shot and killed a park-keeper at Bramshill Park in 1621, was forced to withdraw from his archiepiscopal duties by King Charles I in 1627 and retired temporarily to Ford. (Note: George Abbot may not have hunted at Ford, since he was deeply affected by the death of the park-keeper for the rest of his life. Cranmer is known to have been a keen huntsman. "[H]is father permitted him to hunt and hawk, and to ride rough horses: so that when he was bishop, he feared not to ride the roughest horses that came into his stables; which he would do very comely. ... And sometimes he would shoot in the long-bow, and many times kill the deer with his cross-bow ...") Several instances are recorded when Abbot appointed individuals to the office of park-keeper at Ford between 1613 and 1624, and between 1631 and 1632 he spent £11.15s.6d (£11.78) on repairs there, although he regarded it as a "moorish", or marshy, place.

In 1647, during the English Civil War, Ford was surveyed on behalf of Parliament, which had acquired it from the Church of England, and found to be in reasonable repair. The whole estate was said to be worth a rent of £43.10s. (£43.50), and the value of the materials of all the buildings was put at £820, were they "to be sold ... and taken away". The palace was largely demolished by order of Parliament in 1658, while the see of Canterbury was vacant, and the materials were sold for £840. The estate was returned to the see after the Restoration of 1660, and a report made in 1661 states that "Ford pallace is so much ruonated as if the author therein did count it merit to make such destruction; the mannor house [is] totaly cast down [and] the Chapell made a barne". In 1667 the original barn and the gatehouse were reported as dilapidated, and in 1668 it was reported that the tenant of the remainder of the estate, not including the barn and gatehouse, had continued the demolition and sold "six or seven loads of the best stone". (Note: The tenant "paid dearly for [this sale]. For having to carry [the stone] to the waters side with his own Teame, and [th]e Vessel in which [it] was to be put lying somewhat from [th]e shore he was forced to drive his horses into [th]e water (being very cold) where they stood so long in the water at [th]e severall unloadings that ... every one of his horses died".) At about the same time tiles were sold from Ford to the churchwardens of nearby Herne. Although the remains of the palace continued to be quarried for materials or adapted, parts of the palace hall and chapel stood until 1964, when they were demolished in preparation for a new farm building. (Note: "In 1963 the Church Commissioners sold the farm, without any protective covenants regarding the ruins ... The new owner decided to clear the site, as he was doubtful of the stability of the standing wall ... The Ministry of Public Building and Works ... began the then laborious process of scheduling the ruins. Unfortunately the notice of scheduling ... was delayed by a postal strike, and was not finally delivered until the Hall and Chapel walls had been demolished on 24 July 1964.")

== Archaeology ==
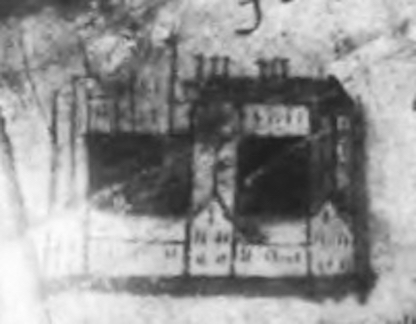
Detail of a 17th-century manuscript map with a pictorial representation of Ford Palace: north is at the top.

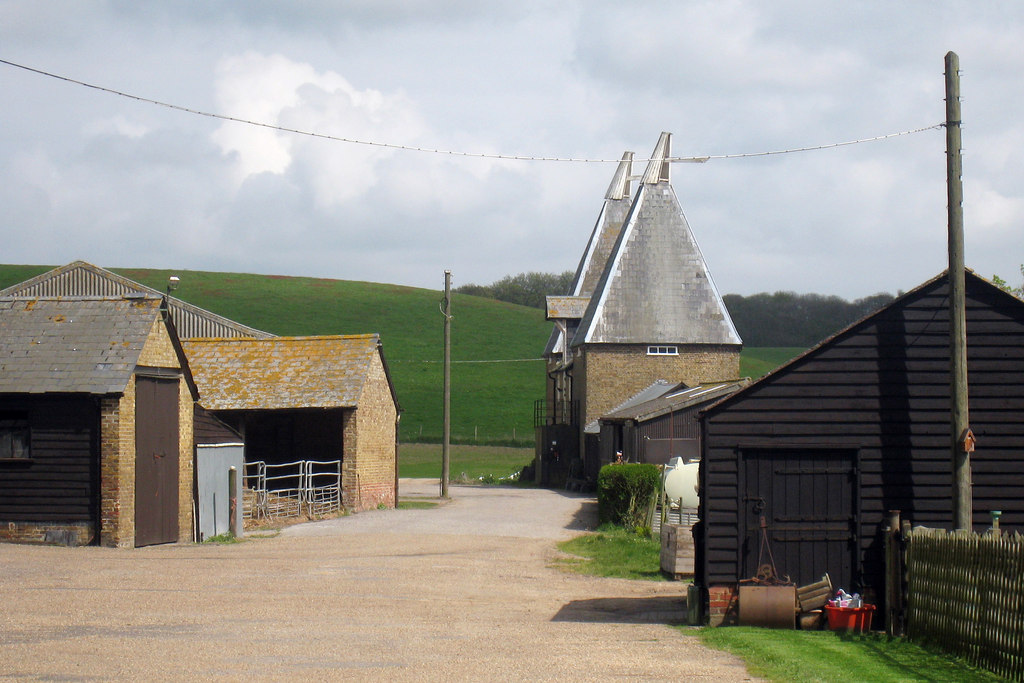
Viewed from the west, this oast house straddles the site of Ford Palace. Roman coins were found during its construction.

While incidental finds on the site of Ford Palace include part of a Roman inscription and Roman coins, very little active archaeology has been undertaken there. In 2011 four circular holes 20 inches (51 cm) in diameter were drilled in connection with proposed construction work slightly to the east of the palace site, but nothing of archaeological interest was found. (Note: The inspection in 2011 was undertaken as a statutory requirement in connection with Planning Policy Statement 5, which has since been superseded. The resulting Heritage Statement is at Wilkinson 2011.) At about the same time, further exploration at the eastern end of the site uncovered "two substantial brick and mortar walls of unknown date". Several structures that probably formed part of the palace remain above ground. Parts of Ford Manor farmhouse, which stands on the site of the palace gatehouse and is adjacent to the public road, date to the 15th and 17th centuries. A barn to the north-east of the farmhouse incorporates much of a Tudor stable block that was originally about 182 feet (55.5 m) long; the structure of its roof features crown posts and tie beams.
