= Maypole Airfield =

Airport in the United Kingdom

- IATA: none; ICAO: EGHB

Summary
- Location: Hoath, Kent
- Elevation AMSL: 125 ft / 38 m
- Coordinates: 51°20′18″N 1°09′25″E
- Website: www.maypoleairfield.com

Map
- Location in England Maypole Airfield (Kent)

Runways
Direction	Length		Surface
Direction	ft	m	Surface
02/20	2,130	650	Grass

Maypole Airfield (ICAO: EGHB) was a general aviation airfield located 2.5 miles (4.0 km) south of Herne Bay, Kent and 5.2 miles (8.4 km) north east of Canterbury, Kent, United Kingdom. It was scheduled to close in January 2021, and is closed as of May 2021.

== Accidents and incidents ==
In September 1940, during World War II, a Hurricane made an emergency landing at Maypole; no fatality was recorded. In October 2012, a small plane overshot the runway and crashed with no injuries.

== See also ==
- List of airports in the United Kingdom and the British Crown Dependencies
- Hoath
- Maypole
