= Hoath =

Village in Kent, England

Coordinates: 51.334°N 1.163°E

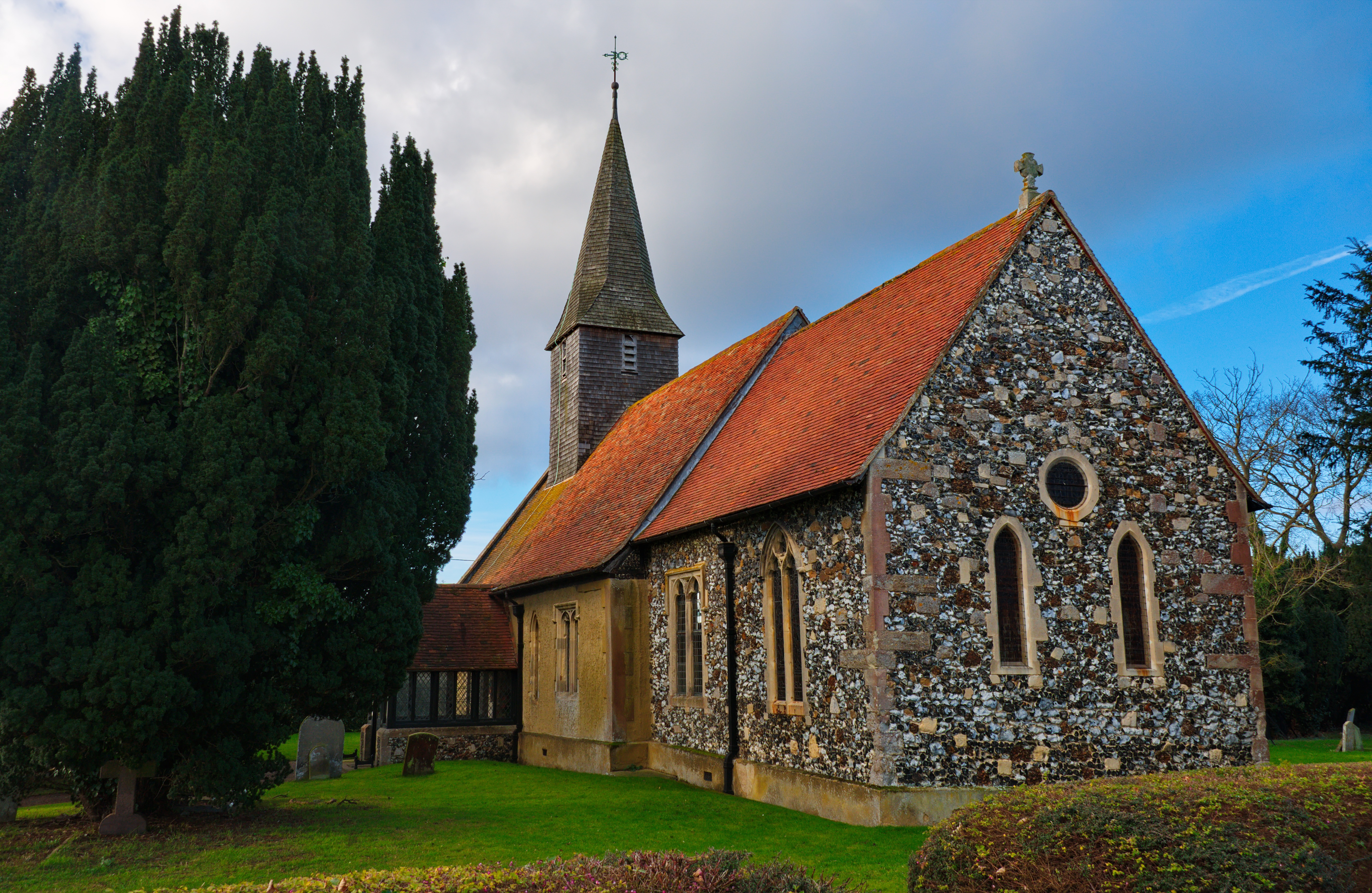
- Holy Cross Church, Hoath

- Location within Kent
- Area: 6.51 km^{2} (2.51 sq mi)
- Population: 551 (Civil Parish 2011)
  - Density: 85/km^{2} (220/sq mi)
- OS grid reference: TR200641
- District: City of Canterbury
- Shire county: Kent
- Region: South East
- Country: England
- Sovereign state: United Kingdom
- Post town: CANTERBURY
- Postcode district: CT3
- Dialling code: 01227
- Police: Kent
- Fire: Kent
- Ambulance: South East Coast
- UK Parliament: Herne Bay and Sandwich

Hoath is a semi-rural village and civil parish in the City of Canterbury local government district. The hamlets of Knaves Ash, Maypole, Ford, Old Tree, Shelvingford and Stoney Acre are included in the parish.

== Etymology ==
In Kent and East Sussex the Old English term hǣð, which became heath in Modern English, was replaced by an unmutated form, hāð, which, over time, evolved into Hoath. The name thus means "heath".

== History ==
Hoath was part of the estate granted by King Ecgberht of Kent in 669 for the foundation of the church at Reculver, and remained part of that estate when King Eadred granted it to Archbishop Oda of Canterbury in 949. (Note: "[A]s the name [Reculver] is used [in Domesday Book of 1086], it means something larger than the parish but much smaller than the thirteenth-century manor ... It is fairly sure to have included Hoath ...") A chantry either in or connected with Hoath is recorded in the 14th century, with John Gardener as the chaplain, successor to Henry atte Were. On 9 December 1410 Archbishop Thomas Arundel dedicated a chapel to the Virgin Mary and consecrated a burial-ground at Hoath at the request of the inhabitants and his tenants there who, led by Sir Nicholas Haute, Peter Halle Esq. and Richard Hauk, then chaplain of the chantry, promised to observe his ordinances.

The hamlet of Ford was the location of Ford Palace, a residence of the Archbishops of Canterbury from at least the 14th century to the 17th. Robert Hunt, chaplain to the expedition that founded the first successful English colony in the New World, at Jamestown, Virginia in 1607, was born in Hoath in the late 1560s or early 1570s.

== Amenities ==
Within Hoath there is a small primary school and a village hall. A pub, named the Prince of Wales, is at Maypole. The campsite, Southview Campsite is permanently closed now.

A late medieval church, Holy Cross, stands on Church Road, and was originally a chapel-of-ease for St Mary's Church, Reculver. The building was renovated by Joseph Clarke between 1866 and 1867, when a north aisle was added.

Hoath had a small general aviation airfield (ICAO: EGHB) west of the village near Maypole. It closed in May 2021 after the sale of the land to a local builders merchant.
