= Thanet Coast =

Site of Special Scientific Interest in Kent

Coordinates: 51.380°N 1.279°E

- Site of Special Scientific Interest
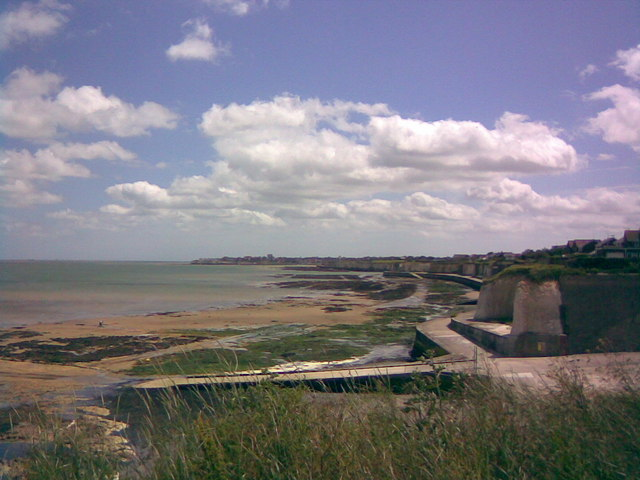
- Location of Thanet Coast.
- Area of search: Kent
- Grid reference: TR 283 696
- Interest: Biological; Geological
- Area: 816.9 hectares (2,019 acres)
- Notification date: 1990
- Location map: Magic Map

Designations

Ramsar Wetland
- Official name: Thanet Coast & Sandwich Bay
- Designated: 28 July 1994
- Reference no.: 664

Thanet Coast is an 816.9-hectare (2,019-acre) biological and geological Site of Special Scientific Interest which stretches along the coast between Whitstable and Ramsgate in Kent. It is a Geological Conservation Review site, and overlaps two Special Area of Conservations. It is also part of a Ramsar Site and a Special Protection Area. Part of it is a Local Nature Reserve,

This site has unstable cliffs and foreshore, saltmarsh, lagoons, woodland and grassland. It has internationally important numbers of wintering birds and three nationally rare invertebrates. It is also an important Palaeocene site and paleobotanical locality.

Natural England divides the Site of Special Scientific Interest into units. The Church Commissioners own some of the land on which unit 10, unit 11 and unit 12 are situated
