= Sandwich, Kent =

Town in Kent, England

Coordinates: 51.27472°N 1.33888°E

Sandwich
- Town and civil parish
- Coat of arms of the Sandwich Town Council

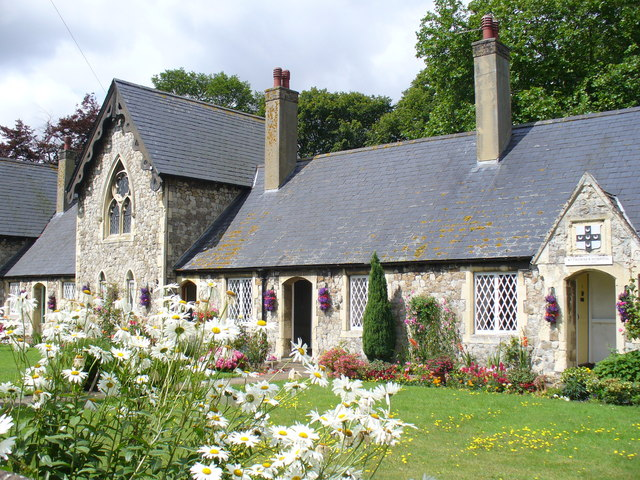
- The 14th-century St Thomas's Hospital

- Location within Kent
- Population: 4,851 (2021)
- OS grid reference: TR335585
- Civil parish: Sandwich
- District: Dover
- Shire county: Kent
- Region: South East
- Country: England
- Sovereign state: United Kingdom
- Post town: Sandwich
- Postcode district: CT13
- Dialling code: 01304
- Police: Kent
- Fire: Kent
- Ambulance: South East Coast
- UK Parliament: Herne Bay and Sandwich

Sandwich is a town and civil parish in the Dover District of Kent, south-east England. It lies on the River Stour and has a population of 4,985. Sandwich was one of the Cinque Ports and still has many original medieval buildings, including several listed public houses and gates in the old town walls, churches, almshouses and the White Mill. While it was once a major port, Sandwich is now 2 miles (3 km) from the sea due to the disappearance of the Wantsum Channel. Its historic centre has been preserved.

Sandwich Bay is home to nature reserves and two world-class golf courses, Royal St George's and Prince's. The town is also a home to many educational and cultural events. Sandwich also gave its name to the food by way of John Montagu, 4th Earl of Sandwich, and the word sandwich is now found in several languages.

== Etymology ==
The place-name 'Sandwich' is first attested in the Anglo-Saxon Chronicle, where it appears as Sondwic in 851 and Sandwic in 993. In the Domesday Book of 1086 it appears as Sandwice. The suffix -wich comes from the Anglo Saxon -wīc, meaning a dwelling or fortified place where trade takes place. The name means "market town on sandy soil".

== History ==
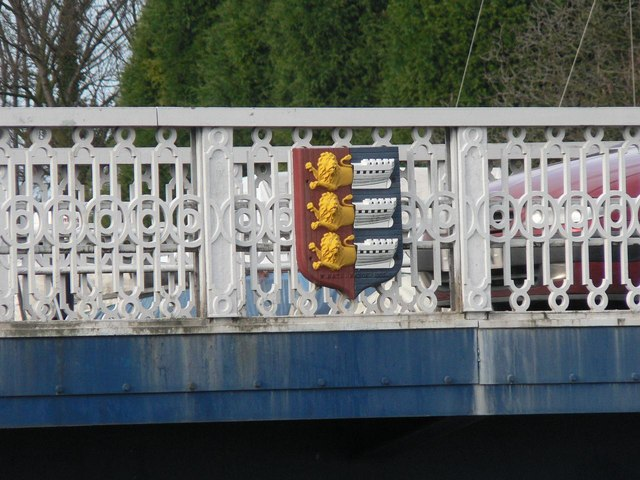
The Sandwich Toll Bridge, showing the town's coat of arms

Before Sandwich became a Cinque Port, the ancient Saxon town of Stonar on the bank of the Wantsum estuary (on the opposite side of the mouth of the River Stour), was already well established. It remained a place of considerable importance but it disappeared almost without trace in the 14th century. The ruins of the major Roman fort of Richborough are close by. It was the landing place of the Roman invasion of Britain in AD 43. In 2008, an archaeological dig proved that this was a defensive site of a Roman beachhead, protecting 700 metres of the coast.

In 1028 King Canute (c. 995–1035) granted a charter to the monks of Christ Church, Canterbury, to operate a ferry across the river and collect tolls. In 1192, returning from the Third Crusade, Richard the Lionheart was jailed by the Holy Roman Emperor Henry VI. Henry released Richard in February 1194. On 13 March 1194, Richard landed at the port of Sandwich and came back to England. In 1216, Prince Louis of France landed at Sandwich in support of the First Barons' War against King John. The Battle of Sandwich occurred just off the coast in 1217. By 1295, Sandwich was a borough within the Lathe of St. Augustine.

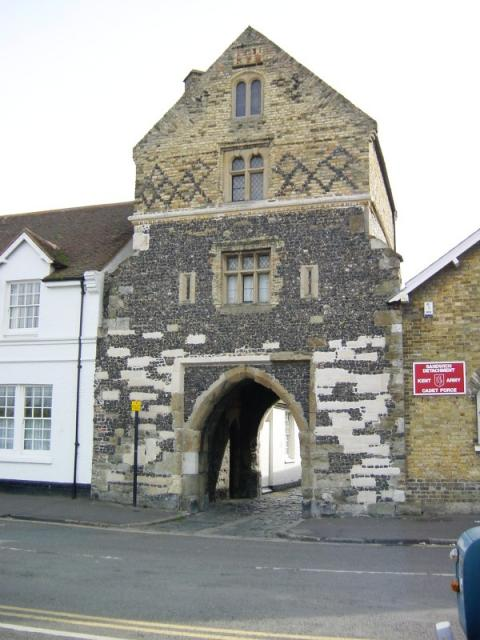
The Fisher Gate

The Fisher Gate on the quay dates from 1384, and has been scheduled as an Ancient Monument. It is the only one of the original medieval town gates to survive. It is a Grade I listed building. The nearby Barbican dates from the 14th century and stands at the end of the bridge over the River Stour where it was used as a toll house.

On 28 August 1457, the French took advantage of political instability in England by sending a raiding party to Kent, burning much of Sandwich to the ground. A force of around 4,000 men from Honfleur, under the command of Pierre de Brézé, Marshal of France, came ashore to pillage the town, in the process murdering the mayor, John Drury. It thereafter became an established tradition, which survives to this day, that the Mayor of Sandwich wears a black robe in mourning.

Sandwich was a key town in the early history of the Huguenots in Kent. The town gained significantly from the skills brought to the town by many Flemish settlers, who were granted the right to settle by letters patent from Elizabeth I, dated 6 July 1561. Sandwich was the only town in England that housed more so-called "strangers" than native Englishmen in the 16th century. Historian Marcel Backhouse estimated there were at least 2,400 Flemish and 500 Walloon exiles living in Sandwich at the time. These settlers brought with them techniques of market gardening, and were responsible for growing the first English celery, which was already - and still is - very popular in Flanders. Elizabeth I granted 25 Flemish families permission to live in Sandwich, and St Peter became the "Stranger's Church" in 1564 when the plague came to the town, in an effort to halt the spread of the disease. The 1661 tower collapse was repaired by the Flemish community, and the distinctive tower reflects their work. The Huguenot refugees also brought over Flemish architectural techniques, that are now as much a part of Kent as the thatched cottage. One can still see the difference between the English (lower section) and Flemish (upper section) of the tower. In addition techniques of silk manufacture were imported, enhancing the Kent cloth industry.

The coat of arms of Sandwich is blazoned Per pale Gules and Azure three demi-Lions passant guardant in pale Or conjoined with as many sterns of demi-Ships Argent; see photo. It is one of the earliest heraldic examples of dimidiation, an early method of combining two different coats of arms: in this case the Royal Arms of England (1198–1340), Gules three lions passant guardant Or langued and armed Azure, and the Arms of the Cinque Ports, Azure three ships Or. The title Earl of Sandwich was created in 1660 for the prominent naval commander Admiral Sir Edward Montagu (1625–72).

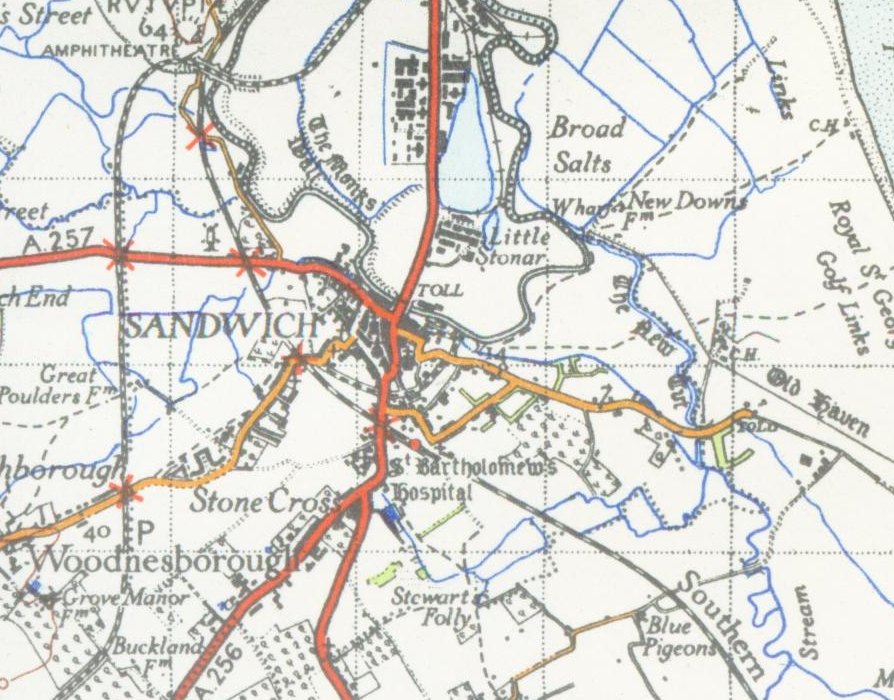
A map of Sandwich from 1945

In 1759, Thomas Paine (1737–1809) had his home and shop in a house at 20 New Street. The house is now marked with a plaque and is a listed building.

In 1912 Sir Edwin Lutyens (1869–1944) built The Salutation in Queen Anne style. The gardens were laid out by Gertrude Jekyll. In World War I, Sandwich was important as a transit location for troops heading to Ypres.

In 1980 Jean Barker became, in the full recitation of her life peerage, Baroness Trumpington, of Sandwich in the County of Kent. In 2014 an original copy of Magna Carta, issued in 1300, was found together with a copy of the Charter of the Forest. It was only the second time in history that the two documents have been found together. They are now displayed alongside other historical artefacts in the Sandwich Guildhall Museum.

== Governance ==
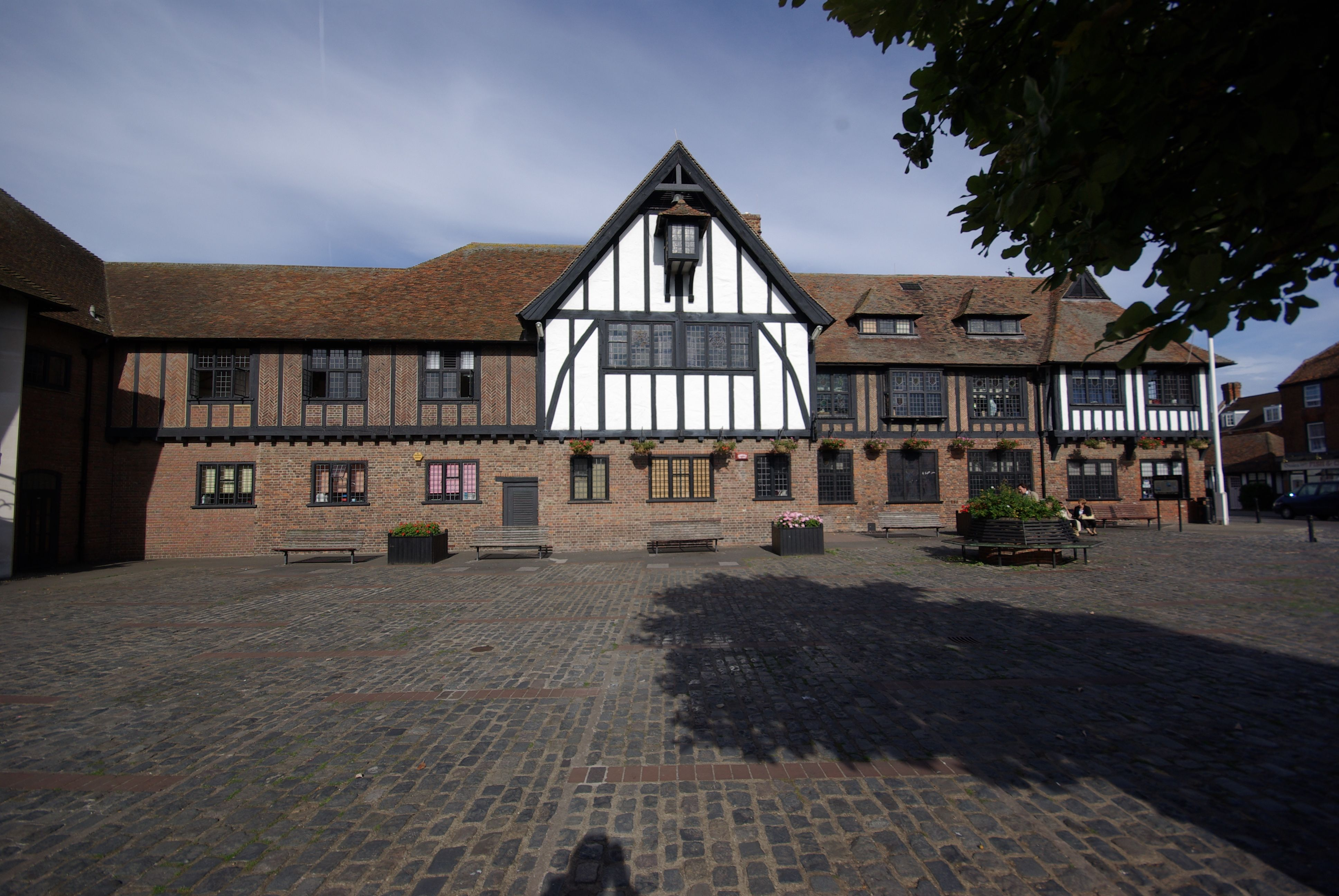
Sandwich Guildhall

The town and parish council has responsibility for local issues, including setting an annual precept (local rate) to cover the council's operating costs and producing annual accounts for public scrutiny. It comprises sixteen town councillors. The parish council evaluates local planning applications and works with the local police, district council officers, and neighbourhood watch groups on matters of crime, security, and traffic. The parish council's role also includes initiating projects for the maintenance and repair of parish facilities, as well as consulting with the district council on the maintenance, repair, and improvement of highways, drainage, footpaths, public transport, and street cleaning. Conservation matters (including trees and listed buildings) and environmental issues are also the responsibility of the council.

The town falls within the non-metropolitan district of Dover. The district council is responsible for local planning and building control, local roads, council housing, environmental health, markets and fairs, refuse collection and recycling, cemeteries and crematoria, leisure services, parks, and tourism.

Kent County Council is responsible for running the largest and most expensive local services such as education, social services, libraries, main roads, public transport, policing and fire services, trading standards, waste disposal and strategic planning.

It is also part of a county constituency represented in the House of Commons of the Parliament of the United Kingdom, and at the general election in 2024 became part of the Herne Bay and Sandwich constituency. It elects one Member of Parliament (MP) by the first past the post system of election.

=== Twin towns ===
Sandwich is twinned with:

- Sandwich, Massachusetts in the United States
- Honfleur in France
- Ronse in Belgium
- Sonsbeck in Germany

== Geography ==
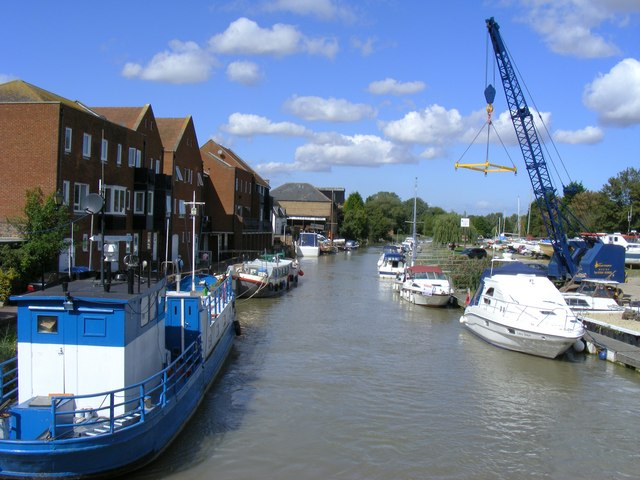
Boats on the River Stour at Sandwich

There is Monk's Wall nature reserve and a bird observatory at Sandwich Bay, which provides a home for wild duck and other wildlife in a wetland habitat. The reserve was opened by celebrity bird-watcher Bill Oddie in May 2000. Sandwich Bay Bird Observatory Trust proposed the design and a management plan, including modifications to ditches and control of water levels to create ecological conditions that attract wetland species of plants, animals and birds. Historically the land was reclaimed from the river and sea by the monks of Sandwich, and the northern boundary is still the old Monks' wall of the 13th century. In the 1953 floods the sea covered the whole area around Sandwich and after these fields were drained a new river bank was created and the land ploughed for arable farming, with heavy use of fertiliser.

There is also a 15 acres (6 ha) Local Nature Reserve known as Gazen Salts.

Sandwich lies at the southern end of Pegwell Bay, which includes a large nature reserve, known for its migrating waders and wildfowl, with a complete series of seashore habitats including extensive mudflats and salt marsh.

== Economy ==
The local economy has benefited from significant investment by Pfizer UK, the British subsidiary of the multinational pharmaceuticals company Pfizer, which built a research and development centre near Sandwich, employing over 3,000 people. Laboratory experiments at the site aroused negative comment by animal rights activists. On 18 June 2007 Pfizer announced it would move the Sandwich Animal Health Research (VMRD) division to Kalamazoo, Michigan. Several important drugs including Viagra, Pfizer's treatment for erectile dysfunction, Maraviroc, a drug used for treatment of HIV and the horse wormer Strongid P were developed here. On 1 February 2011 Pfizer announced that the entire research and development facility at Sandwich would be closed within 18–24 months, with a loss of 2,400 jobs, though it later announced up to 650 jobs would stay. The University of Kent was considering use of the campus style site. The UK Government intervened to establish an 'Enterprise Zone' on the site, which is now run as a business park called Discovery Park Enterprise Zone.

== Landmarks ==
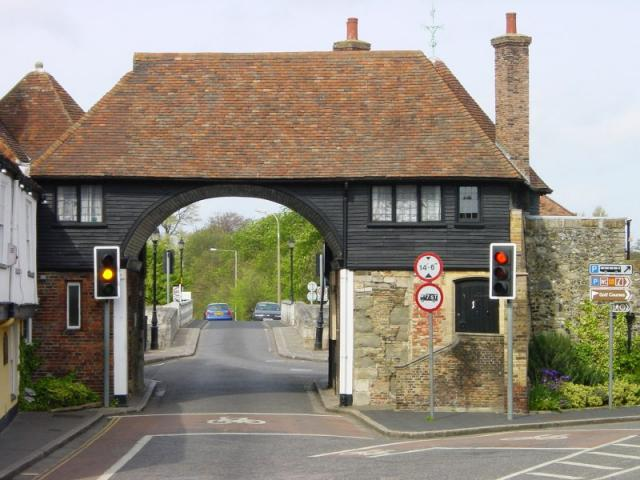
The Barbican

Sandwich Guildhall, in the town square, was built in 1579. It is a Grade II* listed building. The courtroom is still used regularly for civic functions, such as 'Mayor-making', and available to hire as a wedding venue.

The Admiral Owen is a pub in a two-storey, 15th century timber-framed building. It was refronted in the 18th century, but this work preserved the overhang of its first floor on a bressummer and massive corner post with three brackets. The nearby Crispin Inn was originally called the Crispin and Crispianus. It has similar timber framing and was built in the 16th century. Across the road on the quay is the Bell Hotel, which underwent major rebuilding in the 18th and 19th centuries. There has been a Bell Inn on the quay since the 14th century.

The three pubs cluster around The Barbican which was built in the late 14th century. It consists of 2 round towers, with chequered work of stone and flints. A narrow road passes between the towers with a semi-circular timber barrel roof over it. A small 2-storeyed 20th-century house built on to north side of the north west tower was occupied by the toll collector for the bridge. The Sandwich Toll Bridge was built in 1773 of Portland stone with a Dutch type timber raised platform which was replaced in 1892 with an iron swing bridge.

=== Windmills ===
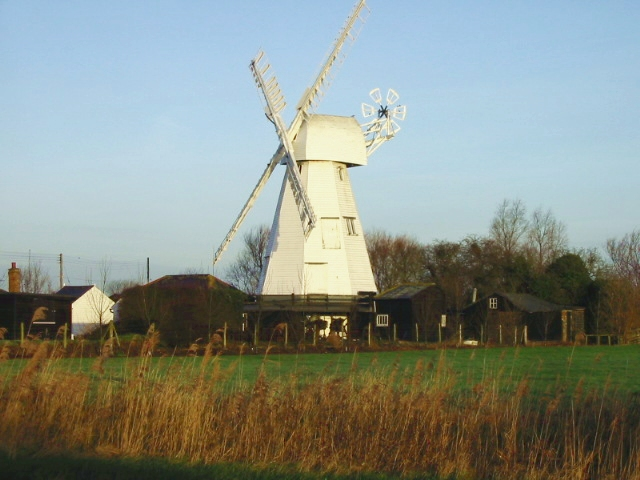
White Mill

Sandwich has had at least eight windmills over the centuries, the earliest reference to a mill being dated 1608. Two windmills were marked by Hasted at the New Cut on the Stour estuary. They were most likely pumping mills associated with the saltworks there in the late eighteenth century.

The White Mill is the only survivor. It was built in 1760 and worked by wind until 1929, then by engine until 1957. Today it has been restored and is a heritage and folk museum. The Black Mill was a smock mill which burnt down c. 1910. There was also a post mill which stood near the Black Mill, and was worked in conjunction with it. A smock mill on the Millwall was also known as the Town Mill. It was burnt down. Another mill of unknown type is known to have stood on the Millwall. A sixth windmill stood to the north west of Sandwich, and west of the railway. It formed a group of three with the Black Mill and its neighbour.

=== Museum ===
Sandwich Guildhall Museum houses original copies of the Magna Carta and the Charter of the Forest from 1300. Other exhibits explore the history of Sandwich and include Roman relics, famous figures and a wide variety of medieval and modern artefacts. Admission is free and visitors can view the Guildhall Tudor courtroom.

The museum was fully refurbished in 2017.

Sandwich Guildhall Archives adjoins the museum and holds material related to the history of Sandwich. This includes maps and plans, photographs, burial information, postcards, newspapers, books, personal collections as well as research relating to Sandwich up to the present day. Access is open to the public by appointment.

=== Fingerpost ===
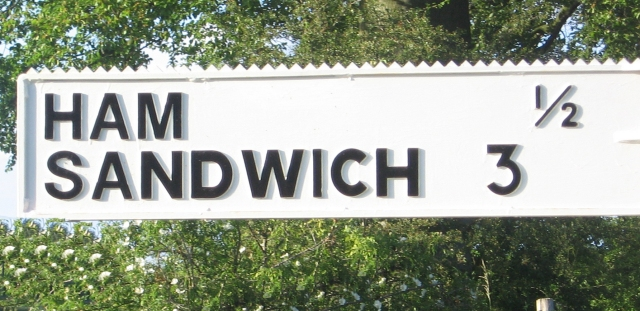
A fingerpost pointing towards the village of Ham and the town of Sandwich

There is a nearby village to the south called Ham. A fingerpost three miles from Sandwich in the hamlet of West Street points towards both Ham and Sandwich, thus reading "Ham Sandwich".

== Transport ==
The town is served by Sandwich railway station. It was formerly also served by Sandwich Road railway station on the East Kent Light Railway.

Sandwich has been bypassed by the A256 road, which connects Thanet to Dover. It is reached from Canterbury by the A257, which joins the A256 at Sandwich.

Stagecoach in East Kent operate local buses to other major towns in East Kent. The main routes from Sandwich are 43 to Canterbury, 45 to Ramsgate, 80 & 81 to Deal/Dover and 43 to Discovery Park

== Religious sites ==
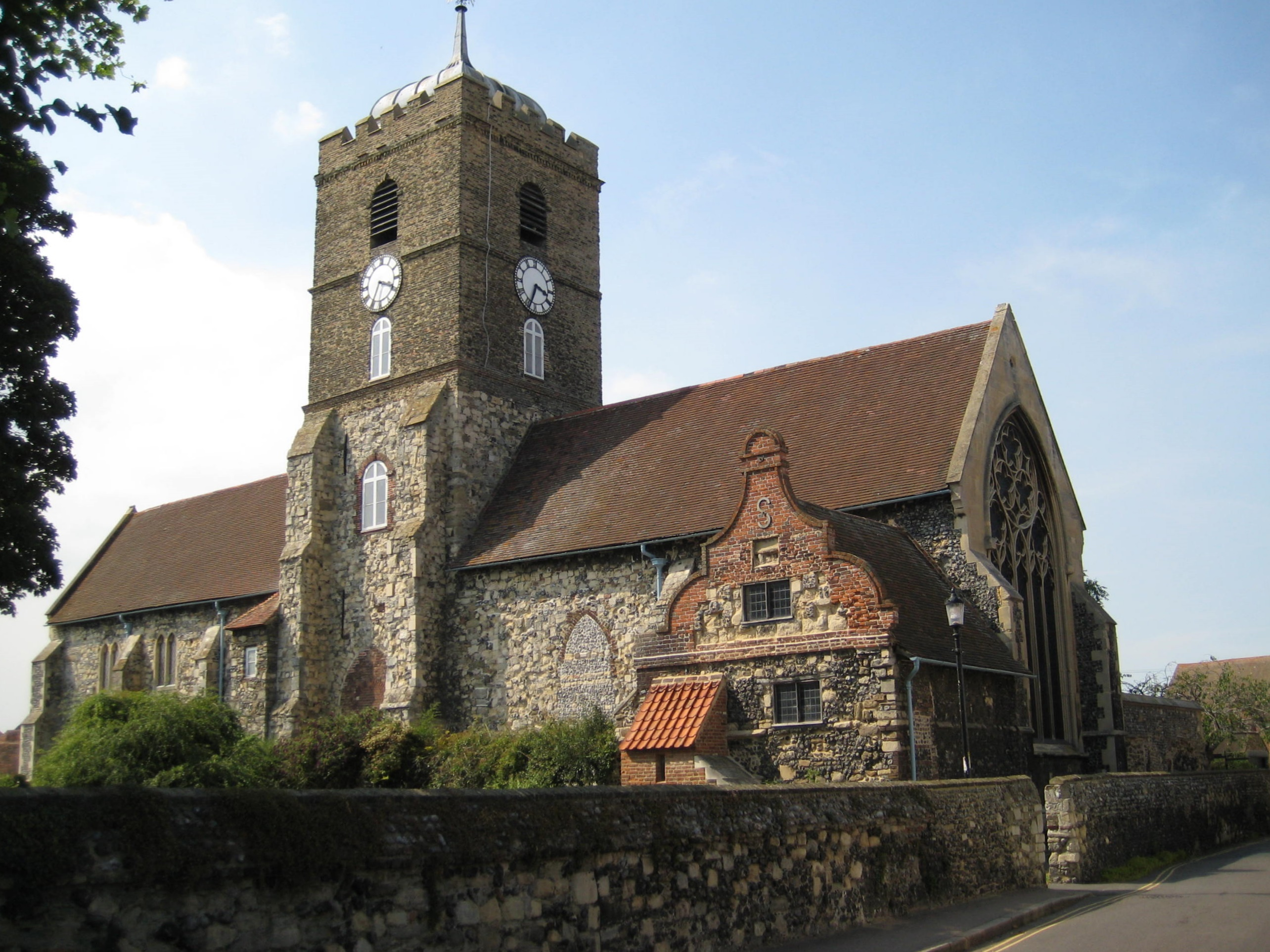
St Peter's Church, now redundant

St Bartholomew's Chapel was restored and enlarged by Sir George Gilbert Scott in the 19th century. Nearby were two religious almshouses: St Bart's Hospital dates back to around 1190, and St Thomas's Hospital was built in the 14th century and named in honour of St Thomas Becket.

The Church of St Peter includes some evidence of early Norman work, but was rebuilt in the early 13th century. In 1661 the top of the central tower collapsed, destroying the south aisle. The Anglican parish church is St. Clement, which has a tower dating from the latter half of the 12th century; the rest of the church is from the 12th and 14th centuries. St Mary's Church also has Norman features and was built on the site of a convent founded by Domne Eafe, cousin to King Ecgberht of Kent.

== Sport ==
Sandwich has two world-class golf courses, Royal St George's which hosts The Open Championship approximately every 10 years, and Prince's which hosted The Open Championship in 1932, and is currently an Open Championship Final Qualifying course. The Open Championship returned to Sandwich in 2011 and in 2021.

== Education ==
Within the immediate area of Sandwich there are four schools: Sandwich Infants (for children aged 4 to 8), Sandwich Juniors (8 to 11), Sir Roger Manwood's School (11 to 18) and Sandwich Technology School (11 to 18).

== Culture ==
The town's connection with the food item of the same name is that John Montagu, 4th Earl of Sandwich, who lived in the 18th century, allegedly invented it. As the story goes, he was an avid gambler, and since he often did not have time to sit for a meal due to his gambling habits, he would order his valet to bring him meat tucked between two pieces of bread. Because Montagu was the Earl of Sandwich, others began to order "the same as Sandwich!" However, the exact circumstances of the invention are still the subject of debate. A rumour in a contemporary travel book called Tour to London by Pierre Jean Grosley (although not confirmed) formed the popular myth that bread and meat sustained Lord Sandwich at the gambling table. An alternative suggestion by Sandwich's biographer, N. A. M. Rodger, is that due to Sandwich's commitments to the navy, to politics and the arts, the first sandwich is more likely to have been consumed at his desk, a practice perpetuated in offices ever since.

=== Sandwich Festival ===
The town of Sandwich has an annual festival period towards the end of August, when a number of events are staged. During Sandwich festivals of the past there have been European markets, motorcycle meets, an illuminated boat parade or dressed ship parade on The Quay, a street barn dance, various concerts (both classical and modern pop/rock), a Simultaneous Chess Tournament with Grand Master John Emms and a vintage car show. The festival usually lasts for eight days.

=== Newspapers ===
Sandwich has two paid-for newspapers, the Deal and Sandwich Express (published by Kent Regional News and Media) and the East Kent Mercury (published by the KM Group). Free newspapers for the town include the Dover Extra, part of the KM Group; and yoursandwich, part of KOS Media.

=== Radio ===
The local radio station for Sandwich is KMFM Shepway and White Cliffs Country, although the town has good coverage of KMFM Thanet.

Sandwich is also covered by community radio service DCR 104.9FM Dover Community Radio, who cover Dover District broadcasting on 104.9FM since May 2022 and online since 30 July 2011, after being founded as a podcasting service in 2010. In May 2020 it was announced by OFCOM that Dover Community Radio have been awarded a community radio licence, and they started broadcasting on 104.9FM FM in May 2022 to Dover, Deal and Sandwich and White Cliffs Country.

Thanet's Academy FM, the community radio station for Thanet, can also be received in Sandwich on 107.8FM.

== In popular culture ==
Author Russell Hoban repurposes Sandwich as "Sams Itch" in his 1980 post apocalyptic novel Riddley Walker.
