= White Mill, Sandwich =

Windmill in Sandwich, Kent, England

Coordinates: 51°16′46″N 1°19′41″E

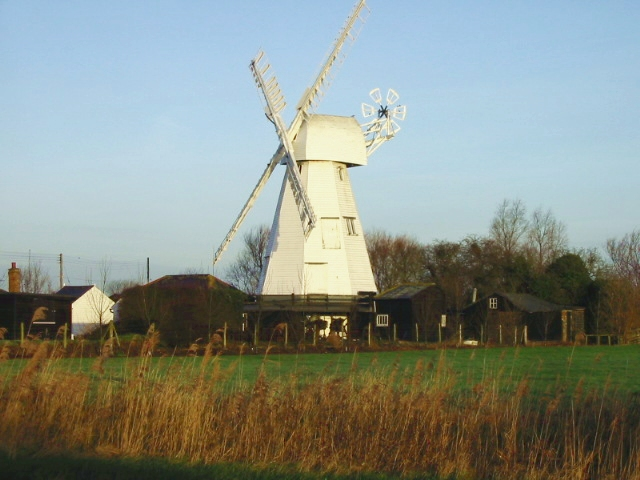
- Interactive map of White Mill, Sandwich

Origin
- Mill name: White Mill
- Mill location: Ash Road, Sandwich, Kent
- Grid reference: TR 322 586
- Operator: The White Mill Museum Trust Ltd
- Year built: 1760

Information
- Purpose: Corn mill
- Type: Smock mill
- Storeys: Three-storey smock
- Base storeys: Single-storey base
- Smock sides: Eight-sided
- No. of sails: Four
- Type of sails: Spring Sails
- Windshaft: Cast iron
- Winding: Fantail
- Fantail blades: Six bladed
- Auxiliary power: Engine
- No. of pairs of millstones: Two pairs driven by wind, third pair driven by engine
- Other information

Listed Building – Grade II
- Official name: The White Windmill
- Designated: 19 May 1950
- Reference no.: 1069758

White Mill is a smock mill west of Sandwich, Kent, England that was built in 1760. The mill has been restored and is open to the public as part of the White Mill Rural Heritage Centre. The museum also includes the miller's cottage, which has been furnished to appear as it did between 1900 and 1939. Other displays in the outbuildings include farming and craft tools, wheelwright and blacksmith workshops.

== History ==
White Mill was built in 1760. It was marked on Andrews, Drury and Herbert's map of 1769 and the 1819–43 Ordnance Survey map. The mill was worked by the Stanley family for many years. The mill was last powered by wind in 1926. From then until 1957 it was being powered by a 28-horsepower (21 kW) oil engine.

The mill was repaired in the 1960s by Vincent Pargeter before he became a professional millwright. A pair of sails from the demolished Tower mill at Wingham was erected on the mill. The work was initially financed by Pargeter himself but in 1964, the Society for the Protection of Ancient Buildings gave a grant for the purchase of materials to repair the mill. The mill was acquired by Sandwich Borough Council in 1968, and later passed into the ownership of Kent County Council.

The White Mill Rural Heritage Centre, a local volunteer group, convened in the early 2010s to restore the mill to functionality. The cap of the mill was detached in 2018 for repairs, and reinstalled in 2023 with an estimated cost of £25,000. Four new sails were fitted to the mill on 23 September 2025.

== Description ==
White Mill is a three-storey smock mill on a single-storey brick base. It has four spring sails. The mill is winded by a fantail. The mill drives two pairs of millstones by wind, and a third pair is driven by an engine. Much of the machinery is made of wood, including the brake wheel, wallower, great spur wheel, and stone nuts. The millstones are overdrift.

== Gallery ==
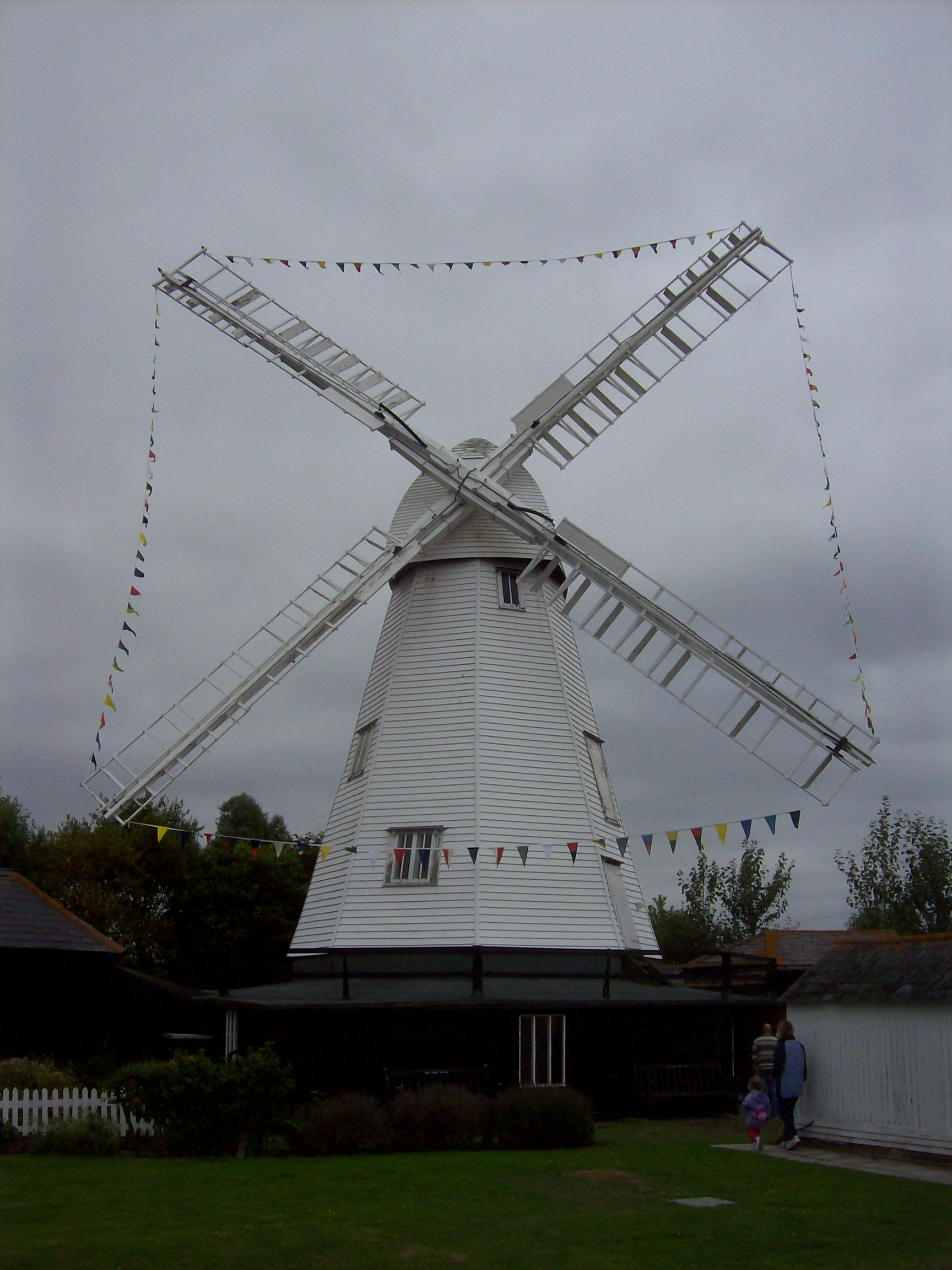
The mill in 2008

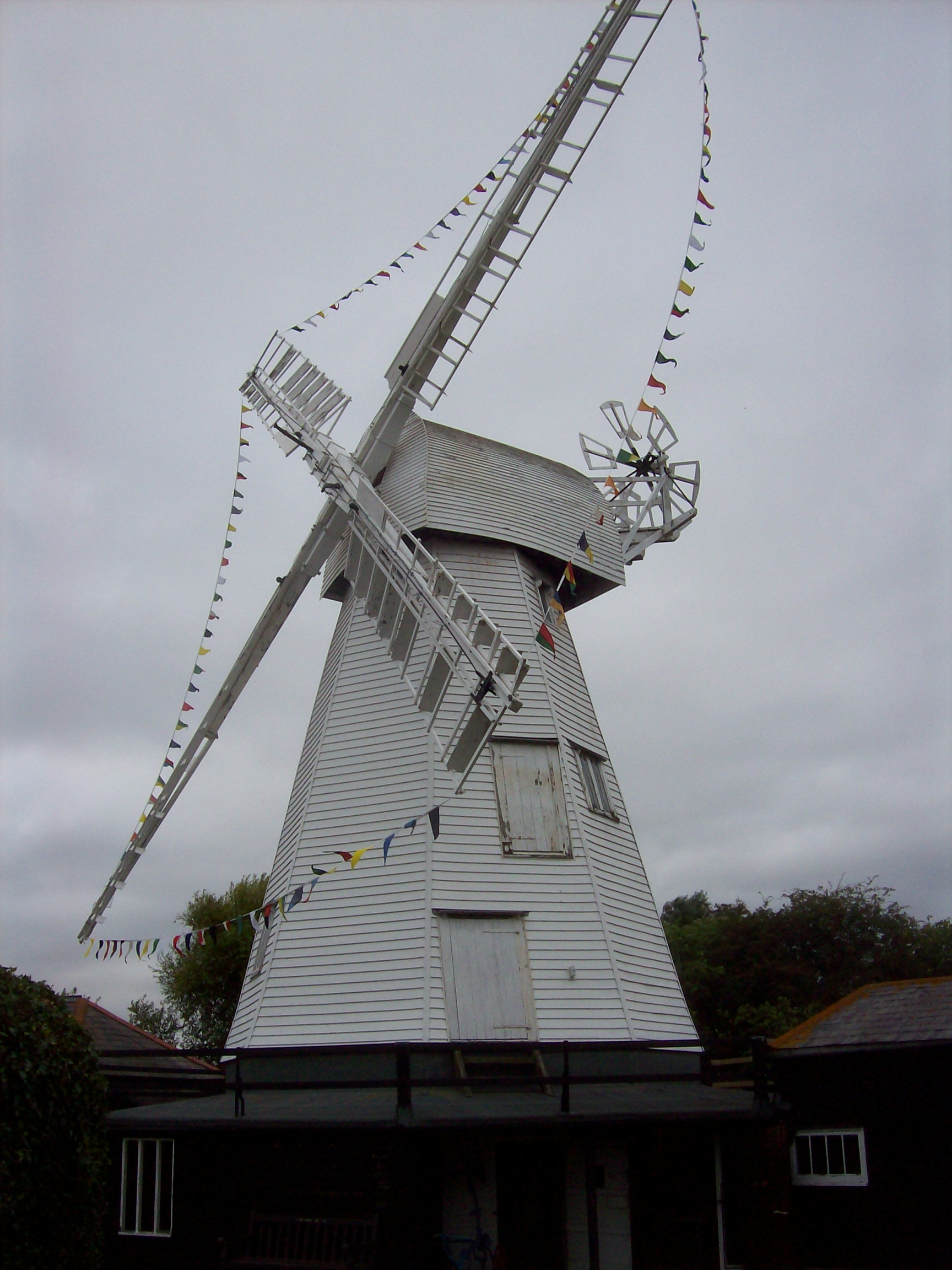

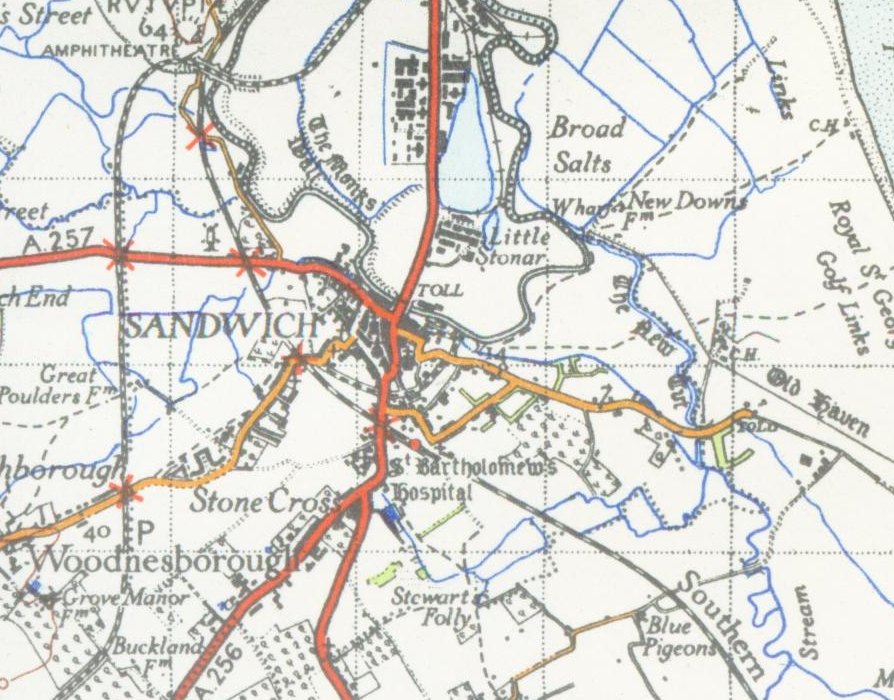
Map of Sandwich, 1945, showing the mill.

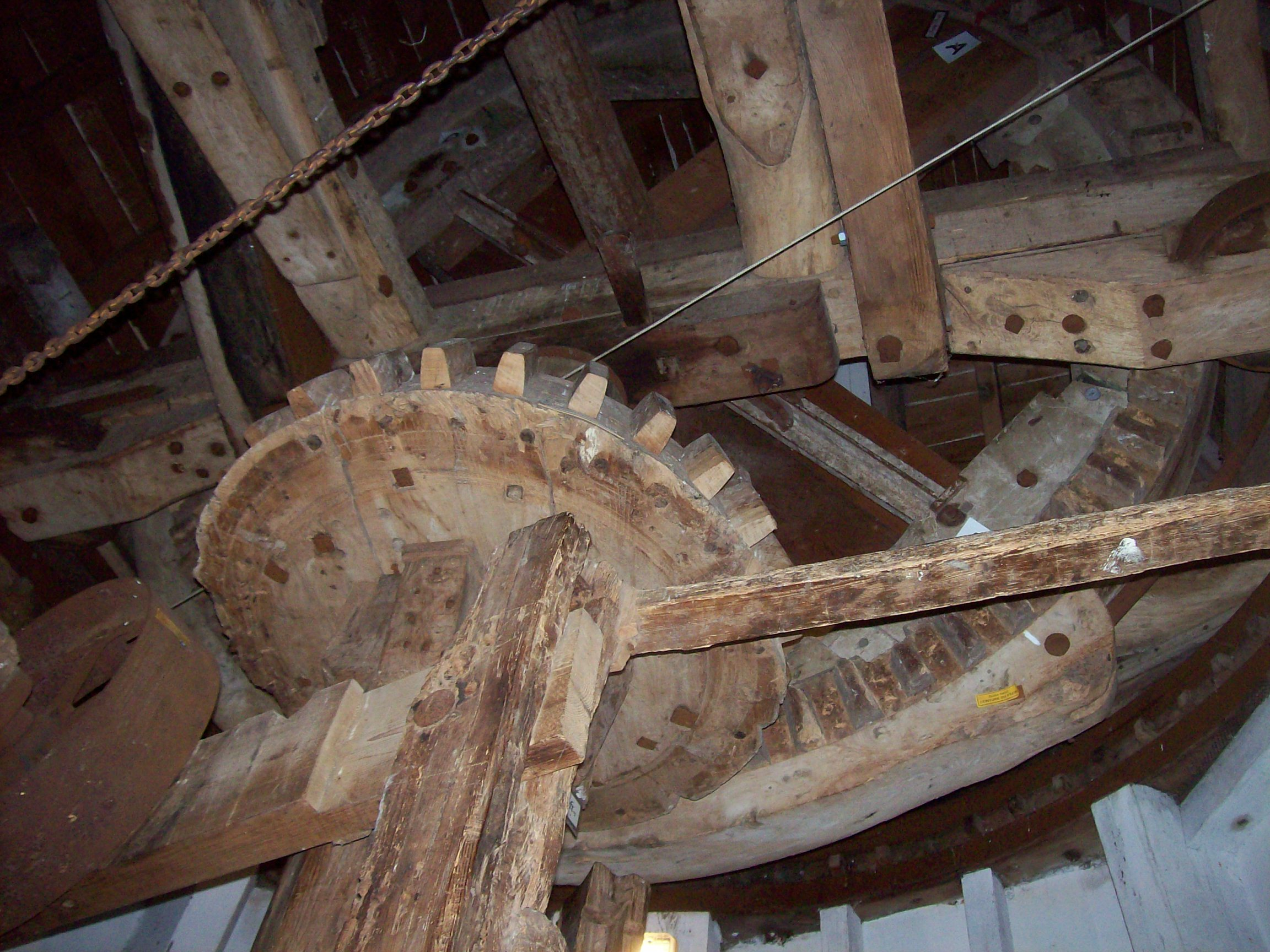
Brake wheel and wallower.

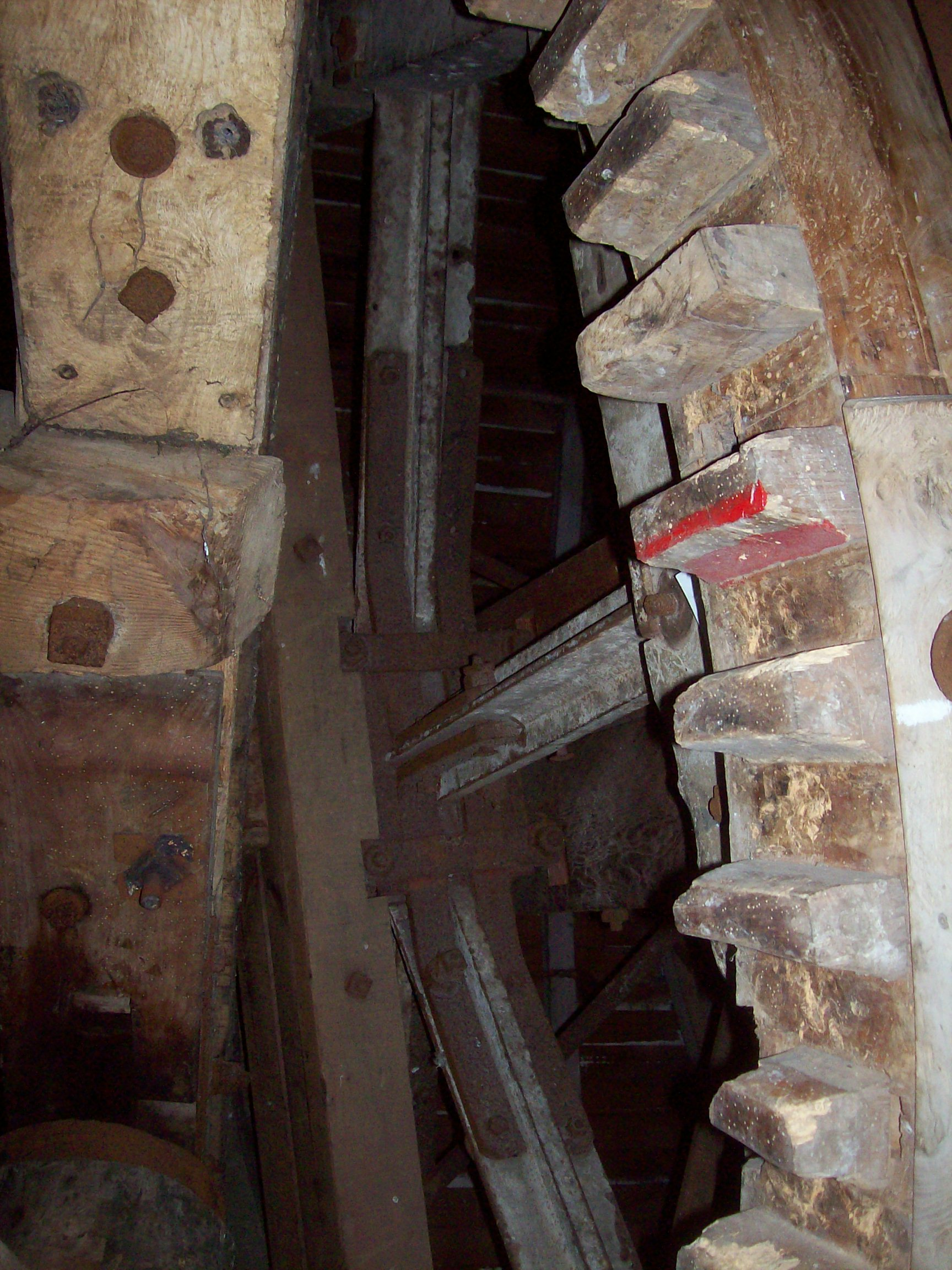
The brake wheel.

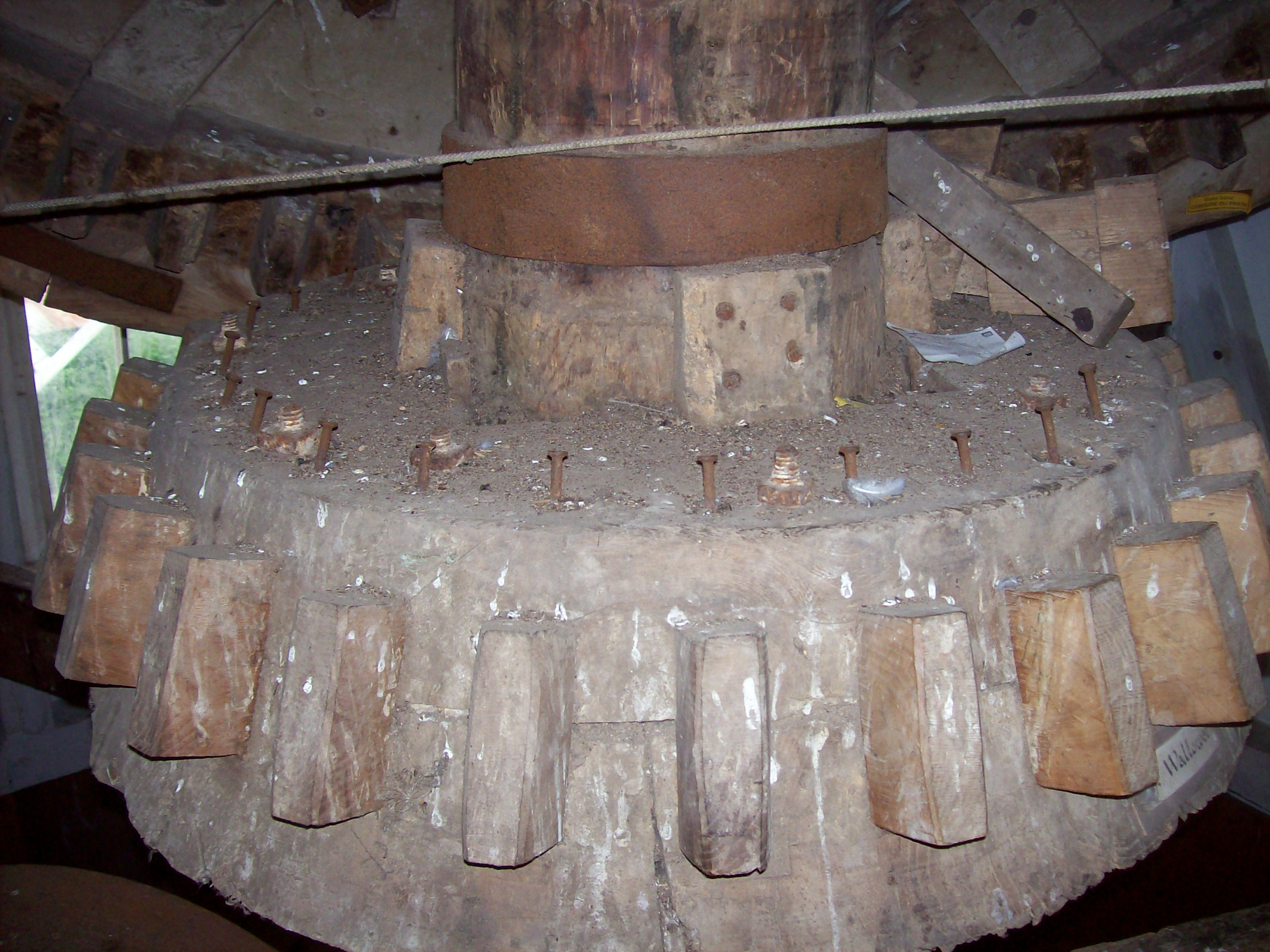
The wallower.

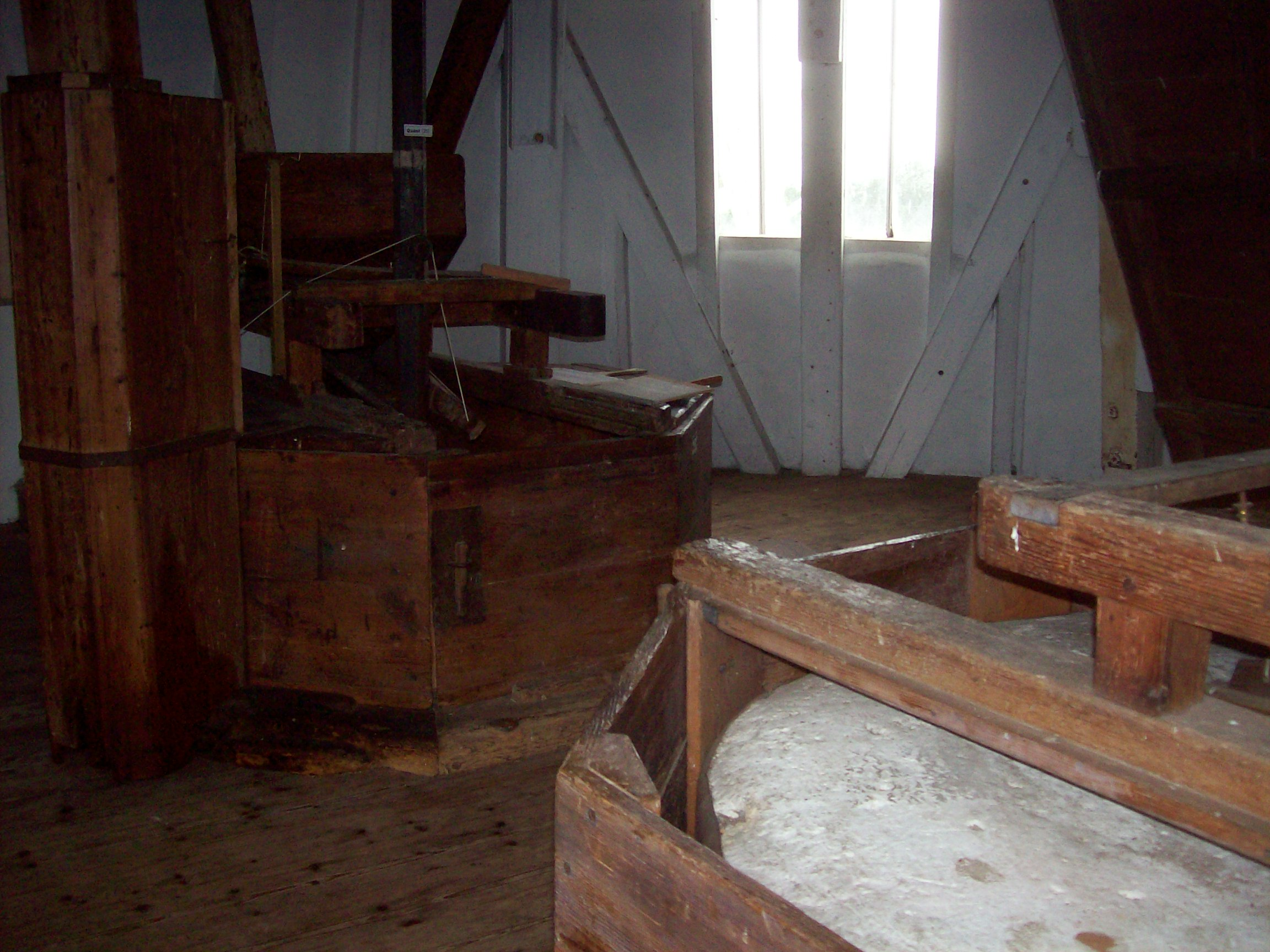
The stone floor.

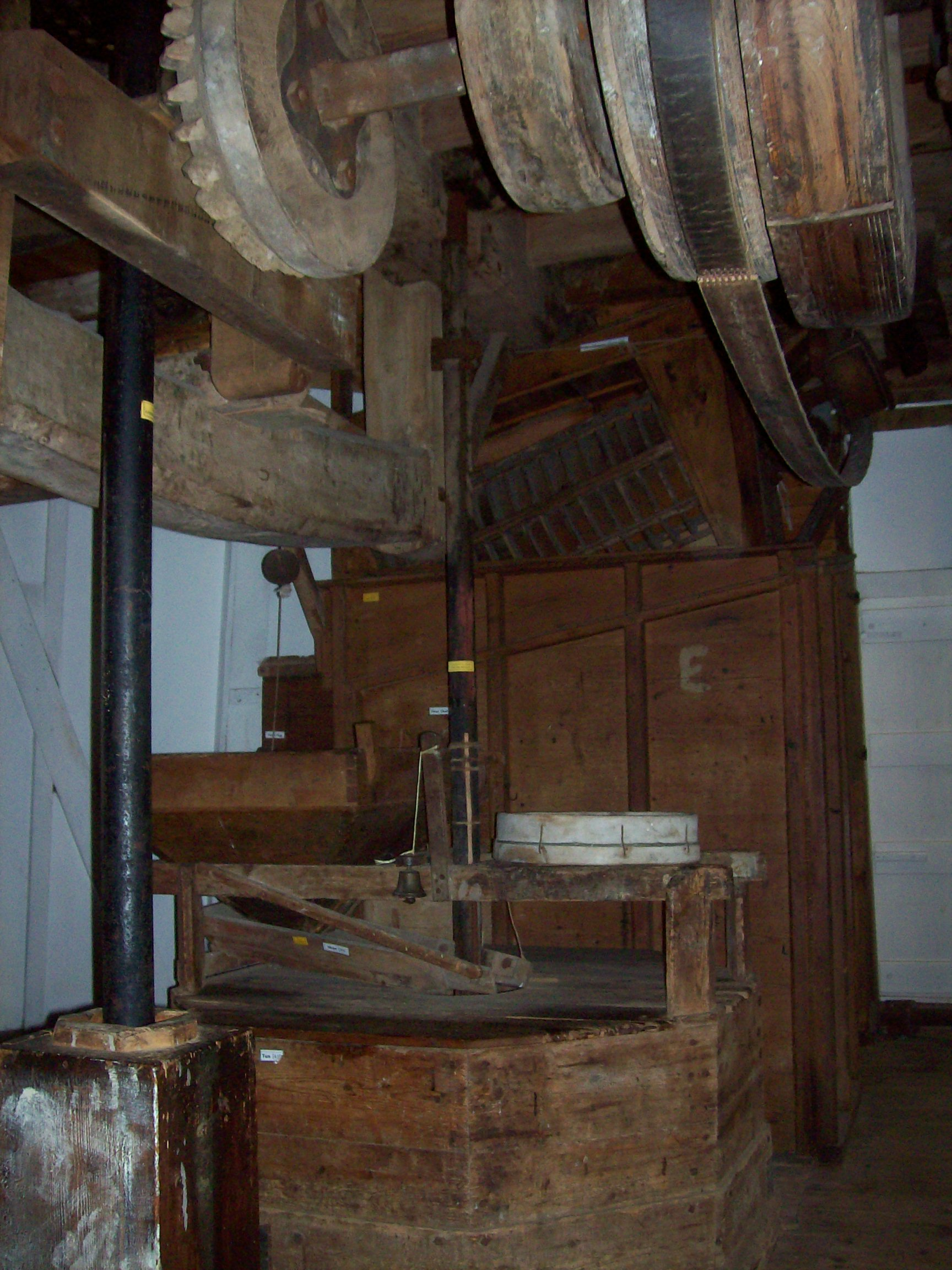
Engine driven stones on the meal floor.

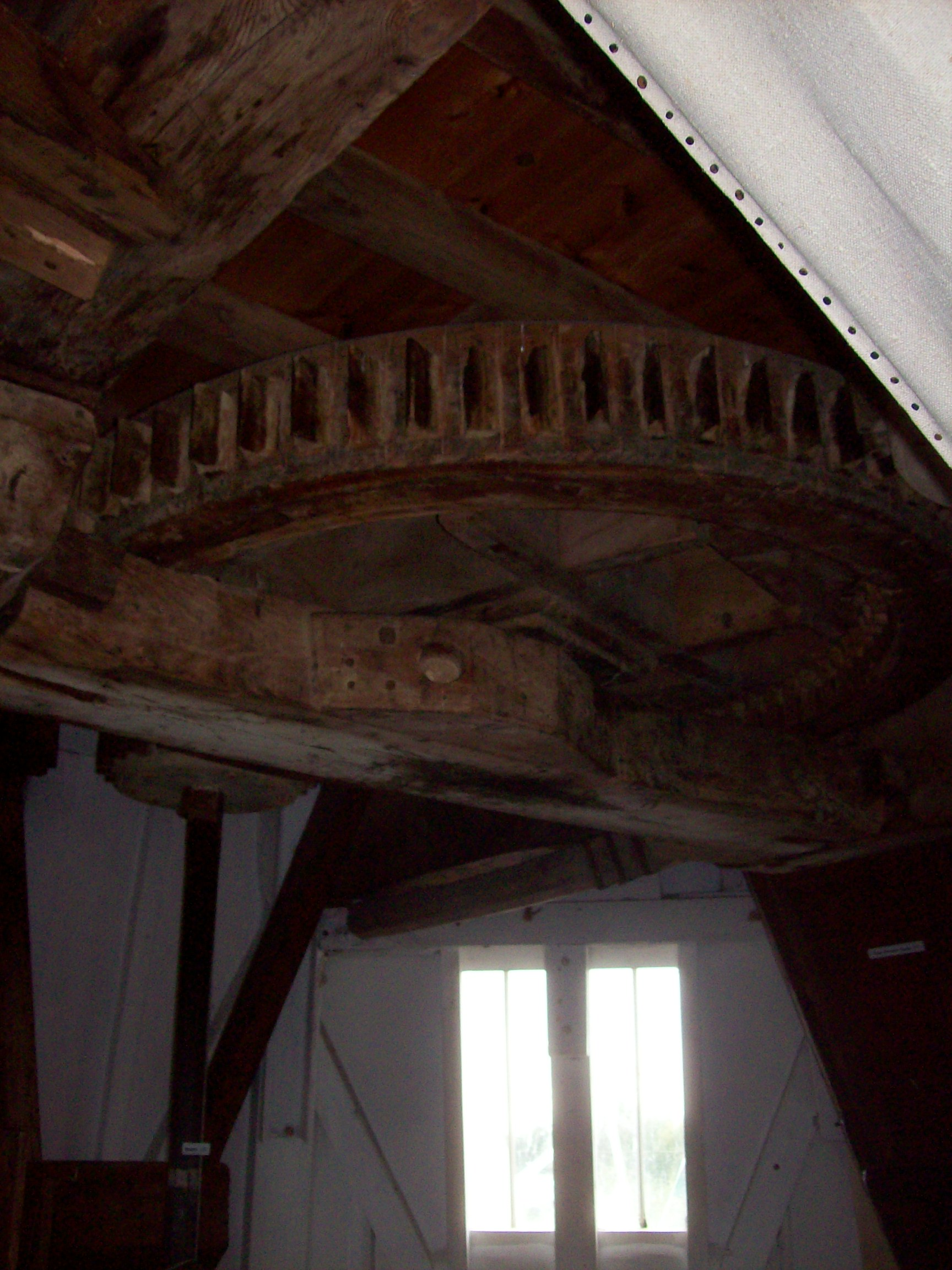
Great Spur Wheel and engine drive.

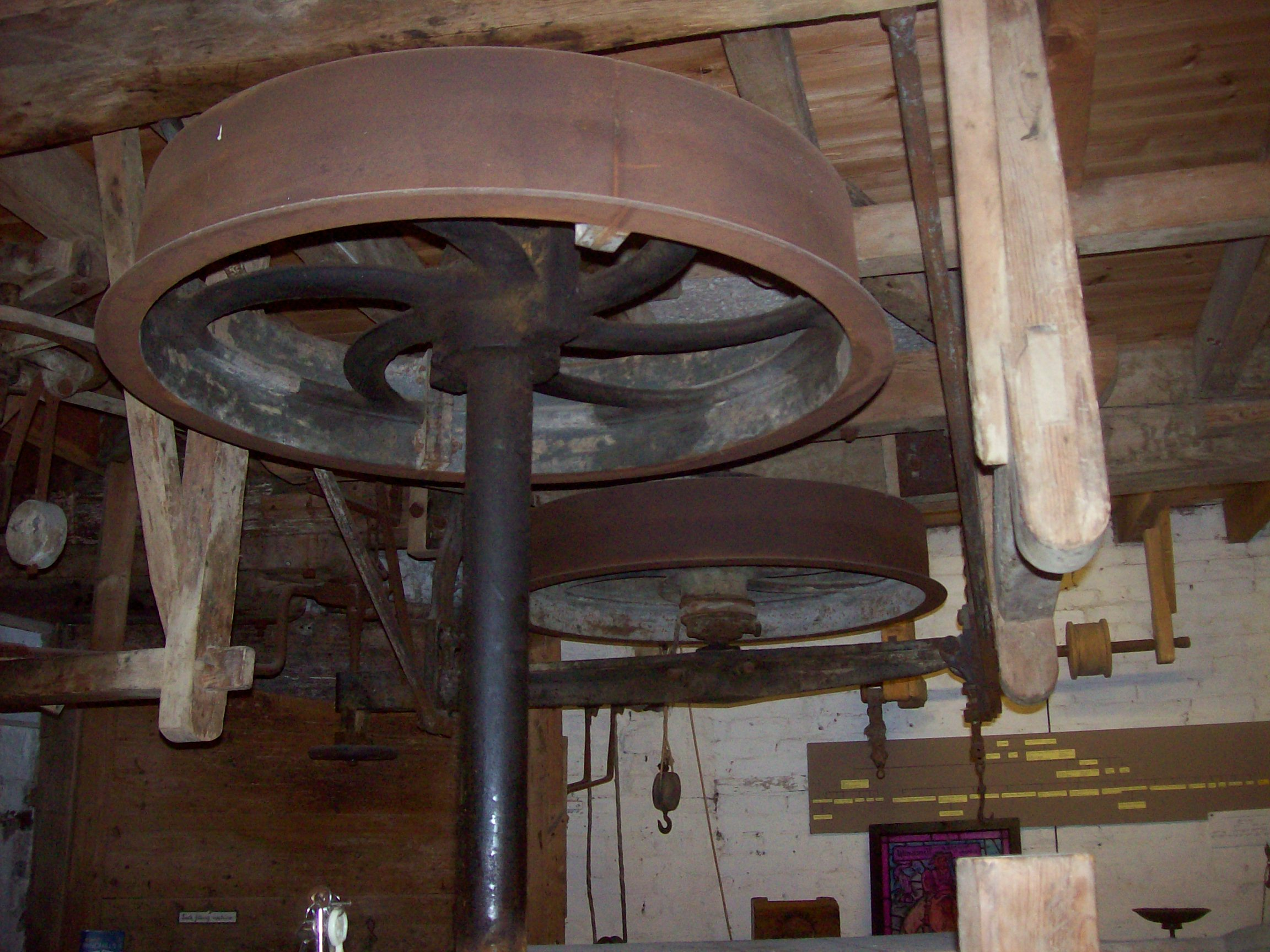
Drive to the engine driven stones.

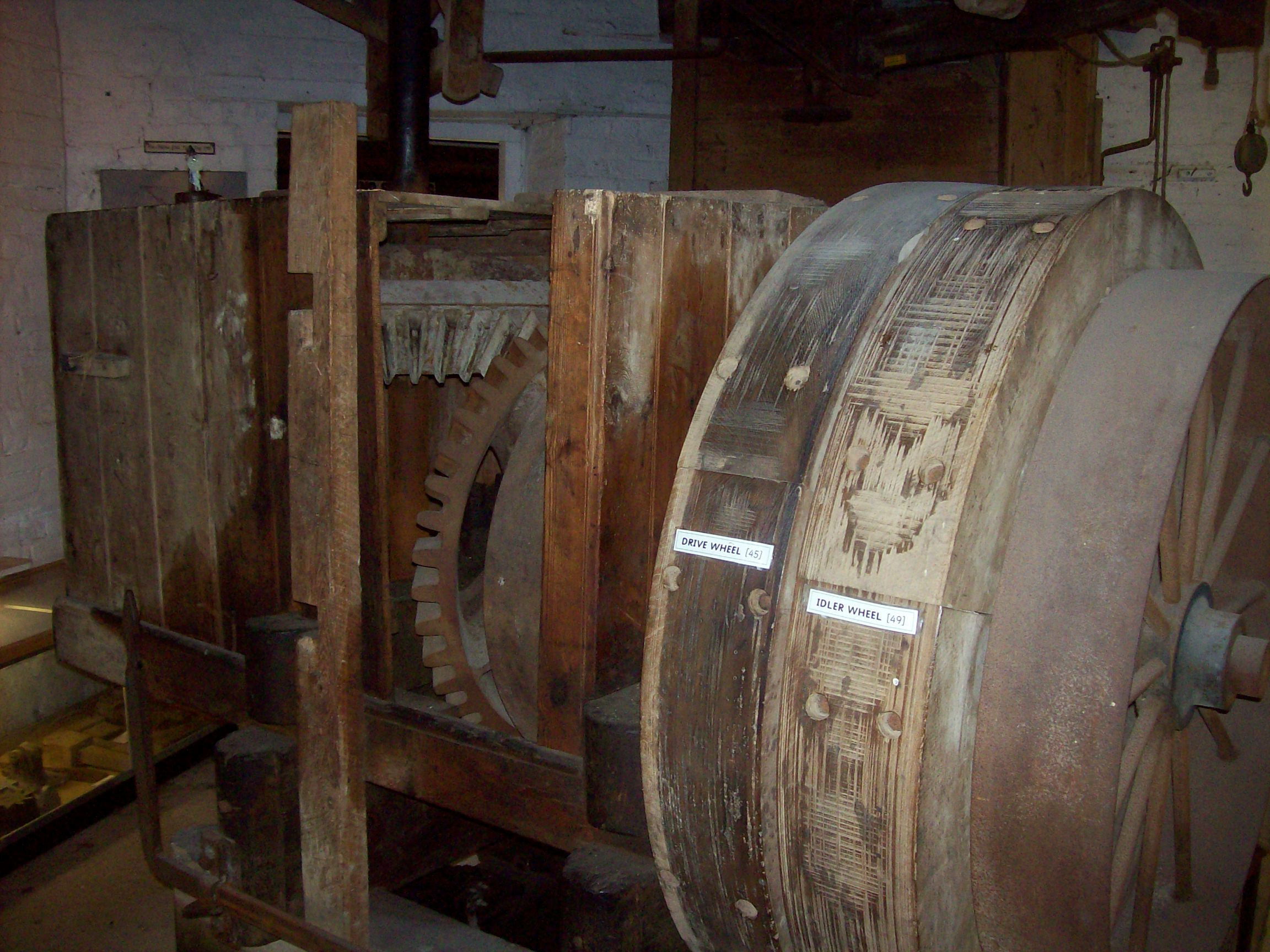
Drive from the engine to the mill.

== Millers ==
- Thomas Stanley 1878
- Stanley Brothers
- Albert Stanley - 1952

References for above:-
