= Monk's Wall nature reserve =

Nature reserve in Kent, England

Coordinates: 51°17′N 1°20′E

The Monk's Wall nature reserve is located a short distance from the quay in Sandwich, Kent and is ideal for seeing wild duck and other wildlife in a wetland habitat. The reserve was opened by celebrity bird-watcher Bill Oddie in May 2000. Sandwich Bay Bird Observatory Trust proposed the design and a management plan which included modifications to ditches and control of water levels to create ecological conditions that attract wetland species of plants, animals and birds.

Historically the land was reclaimed from the river and sea by the monks of Sandwich and the northern boundary is still the old Monks' wall of the 13th century. In the 1953 floods the sea covered the whole area around Sandwich and after these fields were drained a new river bank was created and the land ploughed for arable farming with heavy use of fertiliser.

The site covers 69 acres (28 ha) and attracts many rare and migratory birds such as long-billed waders and the red-rumped swallow. The nature reserve recreates wet grazing meadows which were common before land was drained for agriculture. Returning the site to its natural state has also allowed the establishment of many other indigenous plants and animals.

The current warden is Ken Chapman.

The local community benefits from the programme as a footpath around the reserve allows easy access for walkers and bird watchers.
