= Ham, Kent =

Village in Kent, England

Coordinates: 51.245°N 01.33°E

Ham
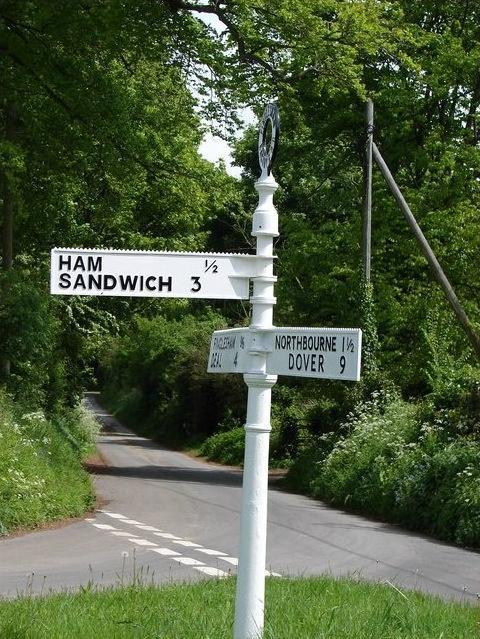
- The famous signpost

- Location within Kent
- Civil parish: Northbourne
- District: Dover
- Shire county: Kent
- Region: South East
- Country: England
- Sovereign state: United Kingdom
- Post town: Deal
- Postcode district: CT14 0
- Police: Kent
- Fire: Kent
- Ambulance: South East Coast
- UK Parliament: Dover and Deal

Ham is a village and former civil parish, now in the parish of Northbourne, in the Dover district, in the county of Kent, England. It is near the town of Sandwich. In 1931 the parish had a population of 63. On 1 April 1935 the parish was abolished and merged with Northbourne.

There is a signpost nearby which points to both the hamlet and the town, thus appearing to read "Ham Sandwich".
