= Sandwich Bay, Kent =

Inlet in Sandwich, Kent, England

Coordinates: 51.30571°N 1.37591°E

Designations

Ramsar Wetland
- Official name: Thanet Coast & Sandwich Bay
- Designated: 28 July 1994
- Reference no.: 664

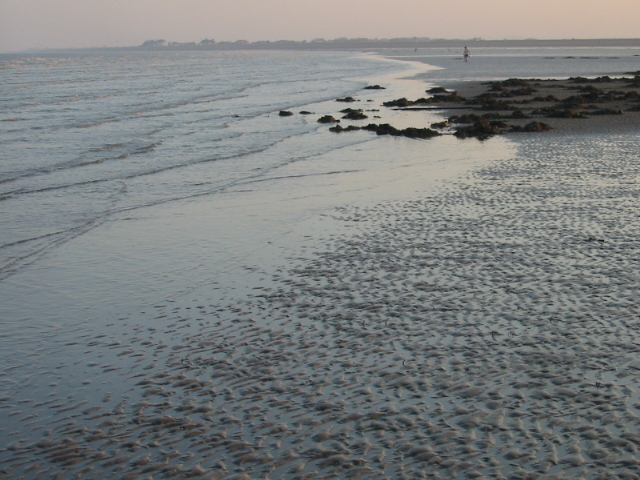
Low tide at Sandwich Bay

Sandwich Bay is a long sweeping inlet of the sea between Ramsgate and Deal, on the east coast of Kent, England. The coastal area consists of sand flats with their associated salt marshes and coastal sand dunes. The Sandwich Flats stretch for about five miles (8 km) along the coast. The coastal habitats are of high ecological importance.

Most of the bay bears national and international nature conservation designations. These include the Sandwich Bay to Hacklinge Marshes Site of Special Scientific Interest (SSSI), the Sandwich Bay Special Area of Conservation (SAC), the Thanet Coast and Sandwich Bay Special Protection Area for birds (SPA), and the Thanet Coast and Sandwich Bay Ramsar Site. The southern emerald damselfly (Lestes barbarus) was found here in 2003, only the second site in Great Britain at which this vagrant species had occurred. There are several Geological Conservation Review sites within the SSSI. The bay is also home to the Sandwich Bay Bird Observatory Trust and the Monk's Wall nature reserve.

The sand dunes at the top of the beach give way to the private road leading through Sandwich Bay estate. There is a 24-hour toll on this road for non-resident motorists of £10.00 per car or £5.00 per motorcycle (2024) but cyclists and pedestrians pass for free. Charges apply 24 hours a day and tickets are bought at the toll house, or online via the Sandwich Bay website when the toll house is closed. The bay closes to visitors half an hour after sun set and re-opens half an hour before sunrise. However, night fishing is allowed if a ticket is bought in advance. Security patrol the estate and seafront 24 hours a day. The road itself runs along on the top of a concealed sea wall separating the beach from the golf courses which back onto it. Via the toll road the beach is only 3–5 minutes from the historic Cinque port town of Sandwich. There are also scenic footpaths leading from the quay in Sandwich, along the river and over the golf course on the dunes to the bay, which can take anything from 30 minutes to 1 hour to walk. Cycling over this route is not advisable due to the length of the path situated upon the dunes and golf-course, but the road route takes only 10 minutes by bicycle.

The beach at Sandwich Bay is largely shingle, and relatively steep in profile at points along its width, but the receding tide reveals some areas of sand. Towards the northern end of the beach Sandwich Bay is separated from the Isle of Thanet by the River Stour estuary, where the Pegwell Bay nature reserve and salt marsh can be found. The only facilities on the beach are a small toilet block and areas at the edges of the dunes for parking. Sandwich bay also has a sea wall, which has a road built on top to stop the waves from reaching the low-lying land behind. Every spring, beach replenishment is carried out, taking materials from the north of the bay, which has travelled up due to long shore drift, and is piled up against this wall to prevent any damage that may be caused by the waves.

The northernmost end of the beach is frequently used as an unofficial naturist beach.
