= Richborough Arch =

Former Roman arch in England

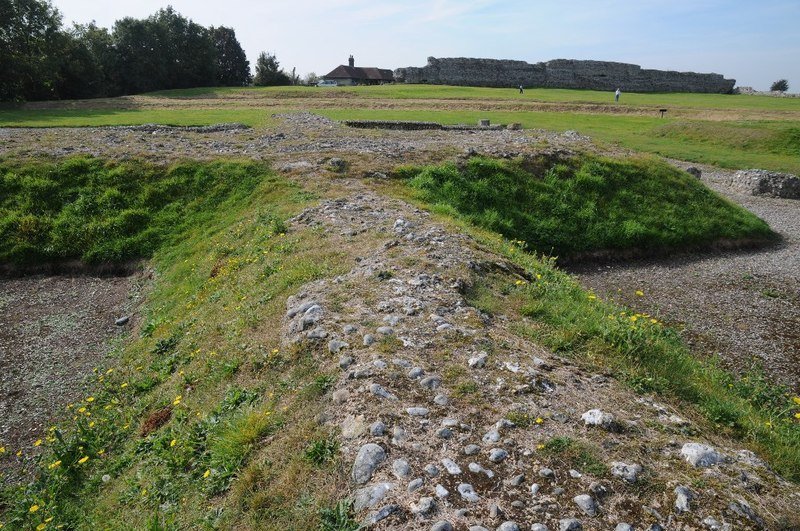
- Remains of the arch's foundations, resembling a cruciform pavement
- Interactive map of Richborough Arch
- Location: Richborough, Kent, England
- Coordinates: 51.293390°N 1.332491°E
- Type: Triumphal arch
- Completion date: c. 90 AD

Richborough Arch was a quadrifons arch that stood at the centre of the Roman town of Rutupiae, now known as Richborough Castle. It was built around 90 AD as a central monument in the town, and later dismantled to make way for the Saxon Shore fort. Despite little of it remaining, the arch has been described as "one of the most impressive ceremonial arches in the Roman world", and a rare example of an ornamented construction in Roman Britain.

== History ==
The arch was built at what is potentially the site of the Claudian invasion of Britain in 43 AD. It likely served therefore as a triumphal monument to the Roman conquest of Britain, following Agricola's victory at the Battle of Mons Graupius in 83 AD.

Importantly, it stood at the end of Watling Street and likely served as a significant gateway into Britannia, with Richborough serving as the main port of Britannia. It is not known which emperor commissioned the construction of the arch; however, Domition is often considered the most likely candidate. Its construction coincided with the rebuilding of roads and houses in the town, the Roman settlement continued developed around the arch, which served as its centrepoint.

The arch and town were surrounded by fortifications in the 3rd century, with the arch itself used as a lookout tower. Shortly afterwards, it was demolished, with its materials reused for construction. Excavations in the site largely commenced in the 19th century, the provenance of the foundations eluding archaeologists. Joscelyn Plunket Bushe-Fox undertook detailed excavations of the structure in the 1920s and 1930s, with first suggestions that it once held a monumental arch proposed in the 1950s.

== Description ==
The original arch was a large Carrera marble monument, 25 metres in height and topped with statuary in gilded bronze. The quadrifons design of the monument would indicate the arch likely stood on a crossroads or intersection, but its significance in Richborough is not known.

The remains of the arch include only the large foundation of concrete, flint and stones. Blocks of masonry are found around the site, with many of them reused for the Saxon Shore fort, as well as a large sculpted head discovered in the original excavation. The foundations measure 37.8 m × 24.3 m, and are 9 m in depth.

== See also ==
- Richborough Castle
- List of Roman triumphal arches
