= Priscilla Napier =

English writer

Priscilla Napier (5 October 1908 – 10 October 1998) was an English writer, specializing in biography.

== Early life and education ==
Born in Oxford in 1908, Priscilla Hayter was the daughter of Sir William Hayter, an adviser to the Egyptian government, and his wife, Alethea Slessor, daughter of a Hampshire rector. Her brother, Sir William Goodenough Hayter (1906–1995), became British ambassador to the Soviet Union and Warden of New College, Oxford, while her sister, Alethea Hayter (1911–2006), was a literary biographer. She spent her early years in Cairo, and later wrote of her mother and her aunts that they were "true Victorians: not in a general way frightened of murder and sudden death, but perfectly terrified of insects".

Napier was educated at Downe House School, in Berkshire, which was then under the headship of its founder Olive Willis, and at Lady Margaret Hall, Oxford, where she graduated (like her sister Alethea three years later) BA in modern history.

== Career ==
Aged 22, Priscilla Hayter married Trevylyan Michael Napier (born 21 June 1901, Kensington London), a Royal Navy officer and a scion of the Napier family of Merchiston. A Napier ancestor had arrived in Somerset from Scotland in the reign of Henry VII, and Trevylyan Napier's father, like his grandfather, was a vice-admiral.

After her husband was killed on active service in 1940, Priscilla Napier was left to bring up their son and two daughters. She then developed a writing career based on studies of her dead husband's family. She also published poetry and an autobiography.

== Publications ==
- A Late Beginner (1966) autobiography, reprinted by Slightly Foxed, 2009
- The Sword Dance: Lady Sarah Lennox and the Napiers (1971)
- A Difficult Country: The Napiers in Scotland (1972)
- Revolution and the Napier Brothers, 1820-1840 (1973)
- Imperial Winds (1981)
- I Have Sind: Charles Napier in India, 1841-44 (1990)
- Raven Castle: Charles Napier in India, 1844-51 (1991)
- Bishop Theophan's The Art of Prayer (translation)
- A Memoir of the Lady Delia Peel, Born Spencer, 1889-1981 (1984)
- The Kingdom of Edmund, AD 841-870 (1984)
- Ballad of King Henry VIII and Sir Thomas Wyatt (1994) long poem, with foreword by Ted Hughes
- Black Charlie: A Life of Admiral Sir Charles Napier KCB, 1787-1860 (1995)
- Barbarian Eye: Lord Napier in China, 1834. The Prelude to Hong Kong (1995)
- Henry at Sea: Part One of the Life of Captain Henry Napier RN, 1789-1853 (1997)
- Henry Ashore: Part Two of the Life of Captain Henry Napier RN, 1789-1853 (1997)
- Coming Home From Sea: Selected Poems (1999)
- Sheet-Anchor (1999) posthumous reprint, with a foreword by Eric Linklater
- Plymouth in War: A Verse Documentary (2000) posthumous reprint
