= Olive Willis =

British educationist (1877–1964)

- Born: Olive Margaret Willis; 26 October 1877; 65 Thistle Grove, Kensington, London
- Died: 11 March 1964 (aged 86); 38 Tedworth Square, Chelsea, London
- Resting place: Downe House School
- Education: Roedean School
- Alma mater: Somerville College, Oxford
- Occupation: Headmistress
- Known for: founding Downe House School
- Parent(s): John Armine Willis (1839–1916); Janet Willis, née Crawford

Olive Margaret Willis (26 October 1877 – 11 March 1964) was an English educationist and headmistress. She founded Downe House School and was its head for nearly forty years, from 1907 to 1946.

== Early life ==
Willis was born on 26 October 1877, at 65 Thistle Grove, Kensington, London, a daughter of John Armine Willis (1839–1916), a school inspector who later became Chief Inspector of Schools for the west of England, and of Janet Willis, who was a daughter of James Coutts Crawford. There were five children in the family, four daughters and a son, and Willis was the second girl. John Armine Willis had been educated at the University of Cambridge, where he was an officer of the Cambridge University Rifle Volunteers, and he liked to take his children on climbing holidays in Switzerland. Willis later remembered that they had "suffered from a surfeit of beautiful things on an empty stomach".

Olive Willis was a rebellious child. In 1891, she was sent as a boarder to the new Wimbledon House in Brighton, which while she was there became Roedean School, and was there for four years. From 1898 to 1901, she was at Somerville College, Oxford, where she read History, gaining a third class in her finals.

== Religion ==
Although baptised in the Church of England, the Willises attended a Theistic church founded by the Charles Voysey in Swallow Street, near Piccadilly. At Roedean, Willis objected to the lack of religious teaching, was attracted to Anglo-Catholicism, and at the age of seventeen was confirmed at the High Anglican St Cuthbert's, Earls Court, remaining a lifelong Anglican.

== Career ==
After Oxford, Willis taught history for one year at Queen Anne's School, Caversham, then in 1902 returned to her own old school, Roedean, where she remained for two years. After that, she became a supply teacher, teaching in a wide range of schools, including the Haberdashers' Aske's School for Girls, which was then in Acton, and a school in Chesterfield.

In 1907, with her friend Alice Carver as a non-teaching partner, Willis founded a new girls' boarding school called Downe House. They raised £1,500 to rent and equip Down House in the village of Downe, near Orpington, Kent, a house which had previously been the home of Charles Darwin. The school began with one girl and five mistresses. Its aim was to achieve educational excellence in a framework which was relaxed but structured. Three more girls were added to the school by the spring of 1908, and by 1910 there were thirty-six girls, of whom all but four were boarders. Willis herself taught English, Latin, Scripture, and history, while Carver was matron and kept house. Carver withdrew from their partnership in 1912, and Willis ran the school alone until 1919, when she took on a new partner called Lilian Heather, who had been at the school since 1907 as a part-time teacher of Science and Mathematics.

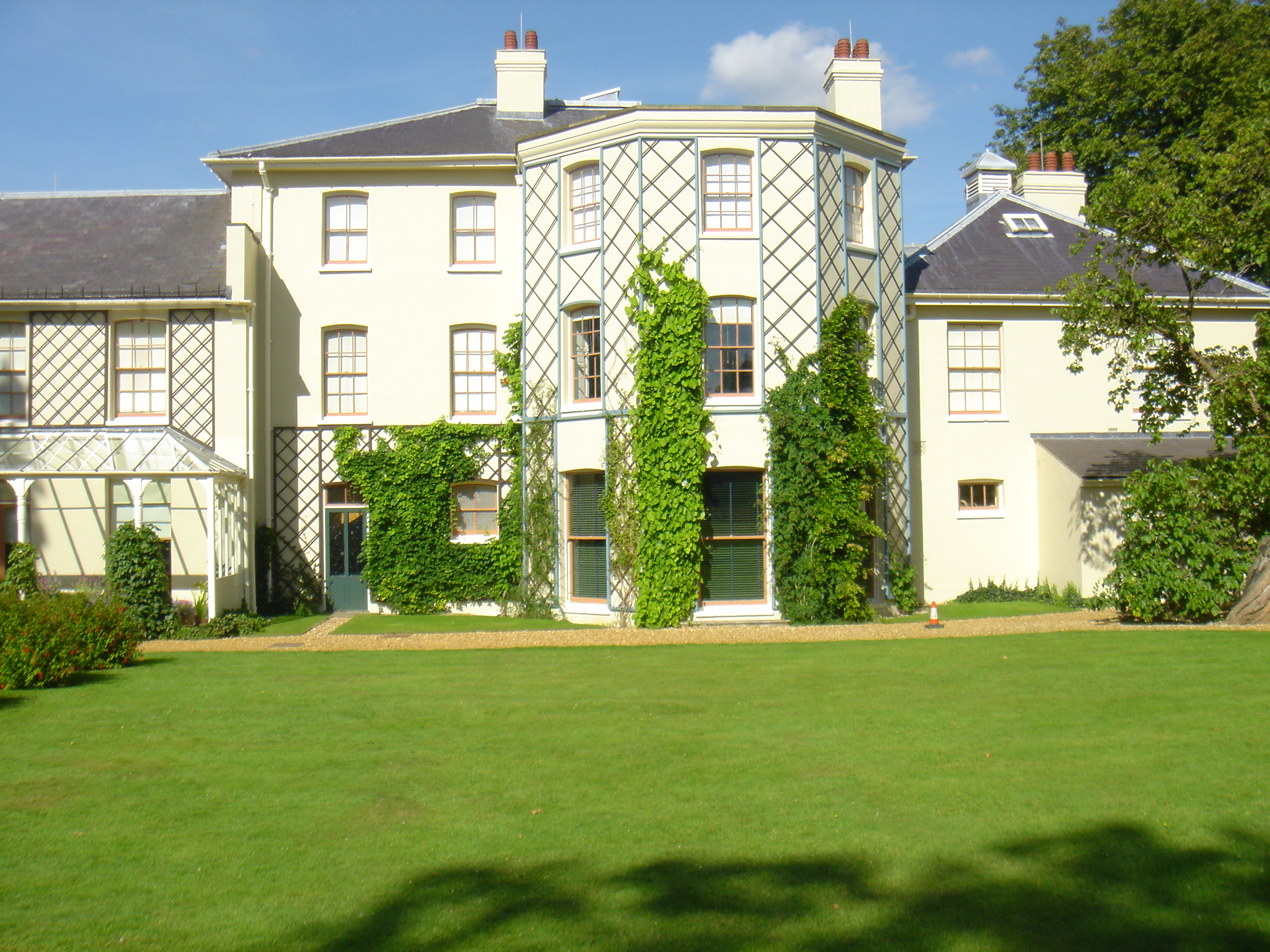
Down House, Downe

The school became popular with literary and academic parents. In 1913, Punch magazine's annual cricket match was played at Downe, with E. V. Lucas, a school parent, captaining one team and J. M. Barrie the other, his team including A. A. Milne. The school produced authors of its own. One of Willis's early pupils was the Anglo-Irish girl Elizabeth Bowen (1899–1973), who became a significant novelist, and Audrey Richards (1899–1984), later a social anthropologist, was her exact contemporary. Other pupils included the sculptor Betty Rea (1904–1965), writers Aletha Hayter (1911–2006) and Priscilla Napier (1908–1998), the poet Anne Ridler (1912–2001), the philosopher Mary Scrutton, the archaeologist Aileen Fox (1907–2005), and the musician Evelyn Rothwell (1911–2008). The composer Robin Milford taught at the school, while Myra Hess gave piano recitals and played with the school orchestra.

In December 1921, with the help of an uncle and with a loan from two parents of girls at the school, Willis bought The Cloisters, Cold Ash, Berkshire, with 60 acres (24 ha), for £11,976. The Cloisters had been designed by the architect James MacLaren Ross and was built during the First World War for the Order of Silence, but the order had been unable to keep up the payments on its mortgage. Willis was able to move her school there just four months after the purchase, in April 1922. For the Summer term of 1922, the school had 83 girls, and by 1925 it had grown to 118.

As a headmistress, Willis had an imposing presence, but a balanced personality, and she inspired respect in her girls. She wanted her school to be a place where "life should be normal", with some freedom and a natural pace. In education, Willis believed that girls should not try to be like boys, and she aimed at a serious attitude towards education, preparing some of her pupils for university life. She could be difficult to work with and knew little of housekeeping, but many of her staff, like her business partner Lilian Heather, were devoted to her. One employee, the eccentric Maria Nickel, was her chauffeur, handyman, architect and engineer, and slept in her bathroom.

== Retirement ==
Heather died in 1943, and in 1944 Willis gave up the ownership of the school, which was transferred to a public body. She retired as headmistress in 1946, but intended to go on living at Hill House, which had been built for her on the school's grounds. This led to her chosen successor moving to another school, and Willis decided to divide her time between Hill House and a second home at 38 Tedworth Square in Chelsea. She kept up with old pupils and continued her interests in the Bermondsey Time and Talents Settlement and in the Girl Guides movement.

In 1964, after living nearly twenty years in retirement, Willis died from a perforated duodenal ulcer at the age of 86 at her London home. She was cremated, and her ashes were buried in a memorial garden at Downe House. Her estate at death amounted to £16,510.

== Bibliography ==
- Anne Ridler, Olive Willis and Downe House: an adventure in education (London: Murray, 1967, Dewey ref. 376'.9422'3)
- Avery, Gillian, "Willis, Olive Margaret (1877–1964), headmistress", in Oxford Dictionary of National Biography (Oxford University Press, 2004)
- Horsler, Val, & Jenny Kingsland, Downe House: a Mystery and a Miracle (London: Third Millennium Publishing, 2006, ISBN 1-903942-50-0 & ISBN 978-1-903942-50-5)
