= Aileen Fox =

English archaeologist (1907–2005)

Aileen Fox FSA
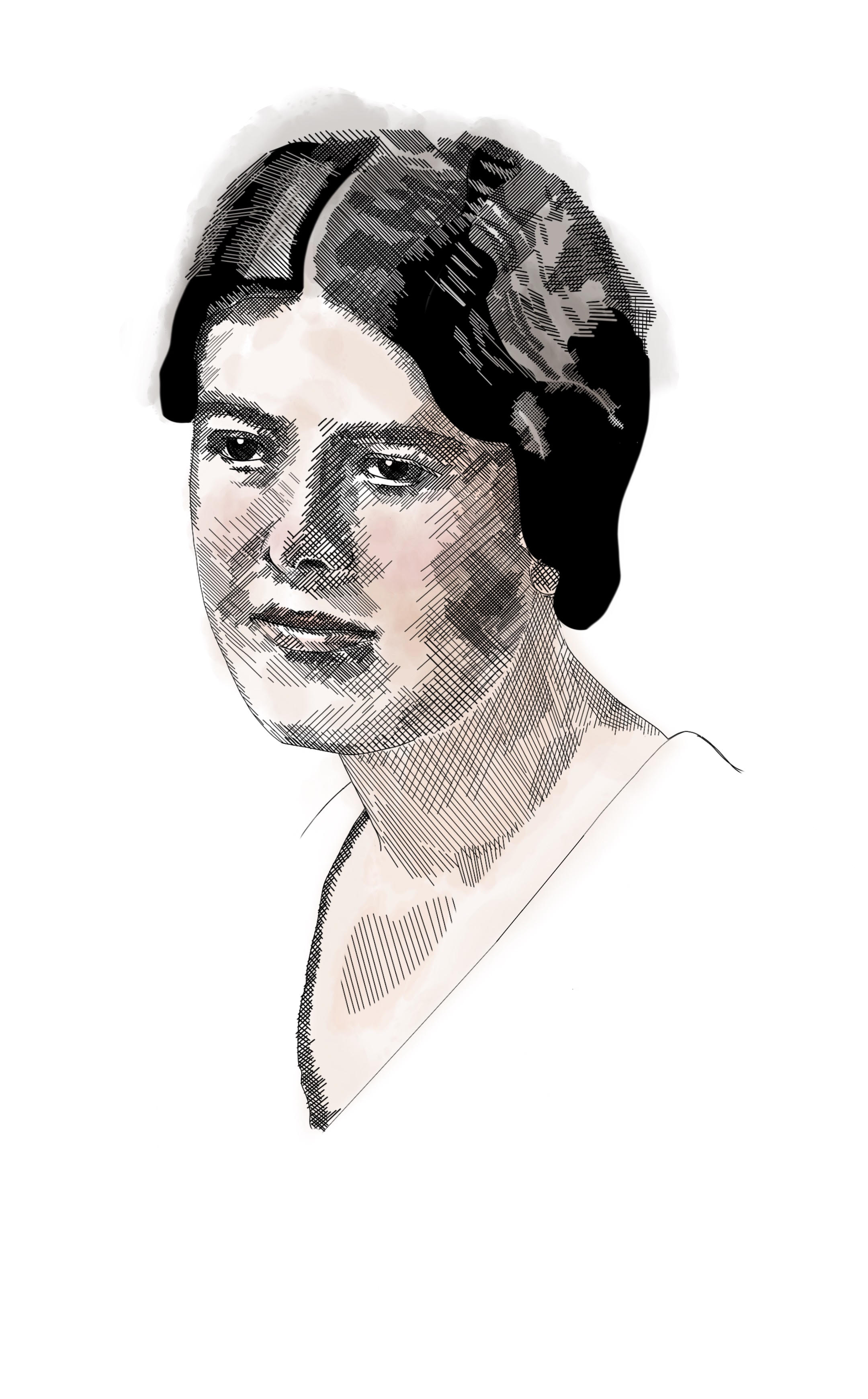
- Born: Aileen Mary Henderson; 29 July 1907; London, England
- Died: 21 November 2005 (aged 98); Exeter, England
- Education: Newnham College, Cambridge
- Occupation: Archaeologist
- Spouse: Cyril Fox (m. 1933)

Aileen Mary Fox, Lady Fox, FSA (née Henderson; 29 July 1907 – 21 November 2005) was an English archaeologist, who specialised in the archaeology of south-west England. She notably excavated the Roman legionary fortress in Exeter, Devon, after the Second World War.

== Biography ==
The daughter of a solicitor Walter Scott Henderson and wife Alice livingstone Henderson (nee Mclean), Aileen Mary Henderson was educated at Chinthurst School in Surrey and then at Downe House School in Kent, where she remained after it moved to Berkshire, under the headship of Olive Willis. She went on to read English at Newnham College, Cambridge.

After graduating in 1929, she worked as a volunteer excavating at Richborough, Kent, under J. P. Bushe-Fox. She spent the following winter at the British School at Rome, before returning to Richborough. In 1932 she excavated at Hembury hillfort, Devon and Meon Hill, Hampshire.

In 1933, she married Cyril Fox, director of the National Museum of Wales, with whom she had three sons. The Foxes excavated prehistoric and Roman sites throughout the UK, although Fox continued to lead her own digs, for instance at the Roman legionary fortress at Isca Augusta (Caerleon, Wales) in 1939. Fox lectured at the University College, Cardiff, from 1940 to 1945. A notable achievement was three seasons of excavation at Roman Exeter after Second World War damage. She then took up a lectureship at the University College of the South West of England at Exeter in 1947, and stayed on until her retirement in 1971.

From the late 1940s, she undertook key excavations in south-west England, shedding new light on prehistoric occupation of Dartmoor, Iron Age hillforts in the region, and the Roman military presence in Cornwall.

In 1965, she was a founder of the Hillforts Study Group alongside Christopher Hawkes and others. In the late 1960s, Fox played a key role in establishing Exeter Archaeological Field Unit. She served as president of the Devon Archaeological Society in 1963–1964 and as a vice-president of the Council for British Archaeology. She believed in nurturing archaeological interest in young people. Her book Roman Britain was a collaboration with the artist Alan Sorrell, whom she had met earlier at the British School at Rome. With her husband's knighthood in 1935 she became known as Lady Fox.

In 1973, Fox became a visiting lecturer at the University of Auckland, New Zealand, and from September 1974 to 1976 acting archaeologist at the Auckland War Memorial Museum, while the museum's archaeologist Janet Davidson studied as a Rhodes scholar at the University of Oxford. Her ten New Zealand years were spent teaching, research, publishing and involvement with organizations such as the New Zealand Archaeological Association and the New Zealand Historic Places Trust (now Heritage New Zealand). Her interest in hill forts led to site records in Auckland, Northland and Hawkes Bay and excavating a pā site at Te Awanga in 1974–1975. She also researched Māori carving, burial chests in particular. Fox returned to Britain in 1983.

== Awards and recognition ==
In 1944, Fox was elected a fellow of the Society of Antiquaries of London, in 1985 awarded an honorary doctorate of letters at the University of Exeter, and in 1998 gained honorary membership of the Prehistoric Society.

== Selected publications ==
- Fox, Aileen (1961). Roman Britain. London: Lutterworth Press. ISBN 9780718808006. (Drawings by Alan Sorrell.)
- Fox, Aileen (1948). "The Early Plan and Town Houses of Silchester (Calleva Atrebatum)". Antiquity. 22 (88): 172–178. doi:10.1017/S0003598X00019785. S2CID 163081732.
- Fox, Aileen (1952). Roman Exeter (Isca Dumnoniorum): excavations in the war-damaged areas, 1945–1947. Manchester: Published for the University College of the South-West of England by Manchester University Press.
- Fox, Aileen (1955). "Celtic fields and farms on Dartmoor, in the light of recent excavations at Kestor". Proceedings of the Prehistoric Society. 20: 87–102. doi:10.1017/s0079497x00017795. S2CID 130181731.
- Fox, Aileen (1955). "Some evidence for a Dark Age trading site at Bantham, near Thurlestone, South Devon". The Antiquaries Journal. 35 (1–2): 55–67. doi:10.1017/s0003581500048617. S2CID 129934196.
- Fox, Aileen (1974). "Prehistoric Maori storage pits: problems in interpretation". Journal of the Polynesian Society. 83 (2): 141–154.
- Fox, Aileen (1976). Prehistoric Maori Fortifications in the North Island of New Zealand. Auckland: Longman Paul. Monograph No. 6 of the New Zealand Archaeological Association.
- Fox, Aileen (1980). "A new look at Maori carved burial chests". Antiquity. 54 (210): 7–14. doi:10.1017/S0003598X00042782. S2CID 163874764.
