= Tedworth =

Tedworth may also refer to:

- Drummer of Tedworth, alleged 17th-century poltergeist
- Tedworth House, a 19th-century country house in Tidworth, Wiltshire
- Tedworth Square, a garden square in London's Chelsea district

== See also ==
- Tidworth, a garrison town and civil parish in Wiltshire, England
