= Cold Ash =

Coordinates: 51°25′26″N 1°15′50″W

- Village
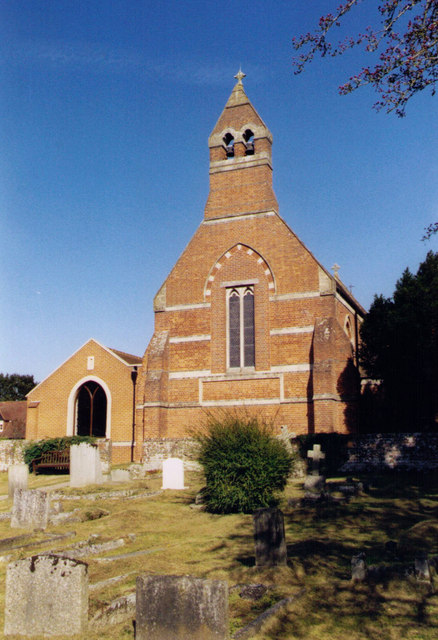
- St Mark's parish church

- Location within Berkshire
- Area: 7.9 km^{2} (3.1 sq mi)
- Population: 4,063 (2011 census)
  - Density: 514/km^{2} (1,330/sq mi)
- OS grid reference: SU5169
- Civil parish: Cold Ash
- Unitary authority: West Berkshire
- Ceremonial county: Berkshire
- Region: South East
- Country: England
- Sovereign state: United Kingdom
- Post town: Thatcham
- Postcode district: RG18
- Dialling code: 01635
- Police: Thames Valley
- Fire: Royal Berkshire
- Ambulance: South Central
- UK Parliament: Newbury
- Website: Cold Ash Parish Council

Cold Ash is a village and civil parish in West Berkshire centred 1 mile (1.6 km) from Thatcham and 2.5 miles (4 km) northeast of Newbury.

== Geography ==
The village of Cold Ash is situated at about 150 m (490 ft) above sea level, along the top of a ridge, marked by Hermitage Road and The Ridge, which divides the River Pang and River Kennet valleys. Parts of the village to the north and east are within the North Wessex Downs and Cold Ash Quarry is a site of Special Scientific Interest (SSSI).

== History ==
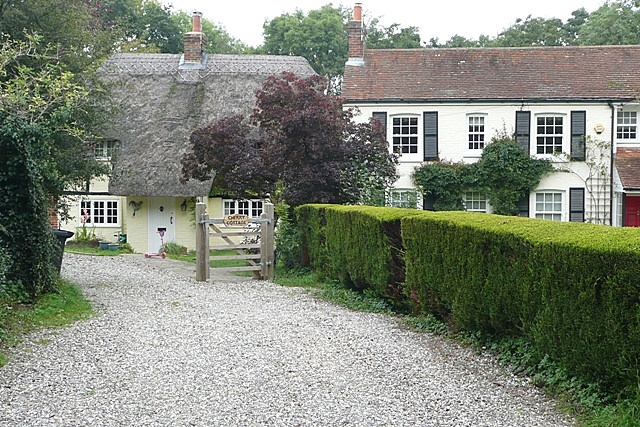
Cottages in Bucklebury Alley, the oldest part of Cold Ash.

The name Cold Ash dates from the 16th century and is mentioned in a 1549 deed of settlement from John Winchcombe to his third son, Henry. During the English Civil War, troops camped on Cold Ash Common before taking part in the Second Battle of Newbury. The area was largely unpopulated before 1800 and consisted of moorland, the oldest part of the village is believed to be Bucklebury Alley. By the end of the 19th century, there were four principal landowners in Cold Ash and a large number of small tenanted dairy farms. Cold Ash Convalescent Home and Children's hospital was opened by a nurse, Agnes Maria Bowditch, in her home in Cold Ash in 1886. By 1901, the hospital had expanded to accommodate 20 patients and specialised in respiratory illness. The hospital closed in 1964 and was demolished, the cul-de-sac, Sewell Close, was built in its place.

== Governance ==
The village was originally part of the parish of Thatcham but separated as an ecclesiastical parish in its own right in 1866, and as a civil parish in 1894. It is administered by the West Berkshire unitary authority and represented in parliament by the MP for Newbury.

== The church ==
The Church of England parish church of Saint Mark was designed by the architect Charles Beazley and built in 1864–65. It is a brick Gothic Revival building with a polygonal apsidal chancel. The chancel windows have late 13th-century Decorated Gothic style tracery. The stained glass in the east window is by Clayton and Bell and the north and south windows by Charles Eamer Kempe.

== Education ==
St Mark's Church of England primary school was built in 1873 next to the church and remained there for some 100 years until it was rebuilt on the other side of the road. The former school building is now a residential property.

Hill House Home for Girls, for 'waifs and strays', opened on The Ridge in 1886, it was renamed St Mary's Home for Girls in 1893 and was an industrial school for girls aged 7–14 years old. The 1891 census records 30 girls living at the home. The home closed in 1946 and the buildings used as a nursery school until 1980. The former home is now divided into private residential properties.

Saint Finian's Convent was built in 1906 as the home of Lady Alice Fitzwilliam. In 1912 she invited the Franciscan Missionaries of Mary to her home to start a school for 'poor girls of the Roman Catholic faith'. Before the children arrived in 1915, the convent provided convalescence for forty Belgian soldiers injured on the Western Front. By 1920, the school boarded 15 girls and in the 1920s the convent changed its name to St Gabriel's while the school retained the name of St Finian's. The Catholic architect Wilfred C. Mangan of Preston designed the chapel, which was built in 1934–36. During World War II, the convent provided refuge for evacuees from London and a spiritual centre for US soldiers based at nearby Greenham Common. The current St. Finian's Catholic Primary School opened in 1977 and the convent is now the Cold Ash Centre, an adult retreat and conference centre.

Downe House School, a girls' boarding school, was founded by Olive Willis and Alice Carver in 1907 at Charles Darwin's former home, Down House, in Kent. The school outgrew its premises and moved to Cold Ash in 1922, taking over The Cloisters which was built by a religious order called the Order of Silence in 1913. St Peter's, a red brick house built in about 1700 and a Grade II listed building, is now part of the school. Former pupils of Downe House include the broadcaster Clare Balding, the actress and comedian, Miranda Hart, Catherine, Princess of Wales and her sister, Pippa Matthews.

== Amenities ==
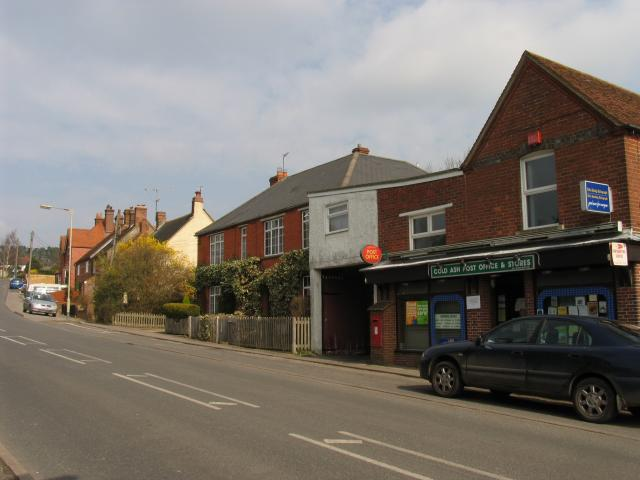
Cold Ash Post Office

In 1925, the Acland Memorial Hall opened. It was built on land donated by Reginald Acland who had worked to provide a recreational facility for the village before his death in 1924. Sir Reginald and his family lived at Thirtover Place which was bought by Girl Guiding Royal Berkshire in 1990 and today provides a range of residential and day activity camps for community groups.

Cold Ash has a shop, post office and two public houses, the Castle Inn and the Spotted Dog. The village also has a Women's Institute, tennis club and horticultural society. Cold Ash Pre-School is based in the Acland Memorial Hall. The village has a recreation ground with two tennis courts and space for football and cricket.

== In popular culture ==
Cold Ash appears as the main location in the novel The Unseen (2011) by English author Katherine Webb.

The conversion of the former pumping station on Fisher's Lane into a family home was featured on Channel 4's The Restoration Man. The episode was first broadcast on 5 January 2017.

== Notable people ==
- Sir Reginald Acland (1856–1924) - barrister and judge
- Gertrude Bacon (1874–1949) - aeronautical pioneer
- John Mackenzie Bacon (1846–1904) - astronomer, aeronaut and lecturer
- W. R. A. Dawson (1891–1918), British Army officer in the First World War
- Sir George Clausen (1852 - 1944), artist lived and died in the village. He and his wife are buried in the churchyard

== Places of Interest ==
Grimsbury Castle - an Iron Age hill fort

== Demography ==
2011 Published Statistics: Population, home ownership and extracts from Physical Environment, surveyed in 2005
Output area	Homes owned outright	Owned with a loan	Socially rented	Privately rented	Other	km^{2} roads	km^{2} water	km^{2} domestic gardens	Usual residents	km^{2}
Civil parish	484	592	95	123	25	0.193	0.012	1.096	4063	7.9

== Sources ==
- Ditchfield, P.H.; Page, W.H., eds. (1923). A History of the County of Berkshire, Volume 3. Victoria County History. pp. 311–329.
- Pevsner, Nikolaus (1966). Berkshire. The Buildings of England. Harmondsworth: Penguin Books. p. 117.
- Piper, Reg (2001). "Cold Ash – A Brief History of the Development of the Village". Cold Ash Parish. Cold Ash Parish Council.
