= Alethea Hayter =

English author

Alethea Catharine Hayter OBE FRSL (7 November 1911 – 10 January 2006) was an English author and British Council Representative.

== Family and early life ==
Hayter was the daughter of Sir William Goodenough Hayter, a legal adviser to the Egyptian government, and his wife, Alethea Slessor, daughter of a Hampshire rector. Her brother, another Sir William Goodenough Hayter, went on to become British ambassador to the Soviet Union and Warden of New College, Oxford, while her sister Priscilla Napier was a biographer.

Hayter spent her early years in Cairo, Egypt, in the years before the First World War, where the three Hayter children were well taught by a governess. The children's lives changed dramatically when their father died, still in his fifties, and they returned to England in reduced circumstances. Alethea Hayter was only twelve years old. Her sister Priscilla later described their happy childhood in Cairo in her memoir A Late Beginner (1966). The three all won scholarships for their higher education. Hayter was educated at Downe House School, in Berkshire, then under the headship of its founder Olive Willis, and at Lady Margaret Hall, Oxford, where she arrived in 1929 and went on to graduate BA in modern history. Of her time at Oxford, Hayter later wrote "We were conventional and innocent, though we considered ourselves pioneering and revolutionary – not in politics, we were not much interested in them, but in our preferences in literature, the arts, social values... In our Oxford days, none of us could have boiled a potato, let alone made a soufflé, or would have known an azalea from a stinging nettle."

== Career ==
Following her years at Oxford, Hayter was on the editorial staff of Country Life until 1938. During the Second World War she worked in postal censorship in London, Gibraltar, Bermuda, and Trinidad.

In 1945, she joined the British Council, and in 1952 was posted to Greece as an assistant Representative. In 1960, she went to Paris as Deputy Representative and assistant cultural attaché, and her apartment on the Île Saint-Louis became a meeting place for writers and artists. Her last British Council posting was as a Representative to Belgium, and she retired in 1971.

She was a member of the governing bodies of the Old Vic and the Sadler's Wells Theatre and of the management committee of the Society of Authors.

== Personal life and death ==
Hayter never married. She died on 10 January 2006, aged 94, and is buried in the churchyard of St Swithun's, Headbourne Worthy.

== Publications ==
On the basis of their originality, Hayter' most important works are considered to be A Sultry Month (1965), Opium and the Romantic Imagination (1968), Horatio’s Version (1972) and A Voyage in Vain (1973).

- Mrs Browning: A Poet's Work and its Setting (1962)
- Elizabeth Barrett Browning (1965)
- A Sultry Month (1965)
- Opium and the Romantic Imagination (1968, rev. 1998)
- Horatio's Version (1972)
- A Voyage in Vain: Coleridge's Journey to Malta in 1804 (1973)
- FitzGerald to His Friends: Selected Letters of Edward FitzGerald (1979) [ed.]
- Portrait of a Friendship: Drawn from New Letters of James Russell Lowell to Sybella Lady Lyttelton, 1881-91 (1990) [ed.]
- The Backbone: Diaries of a Military Family in the Napoleonic Wars (1993) [ed.]
- Charlotte M Yonge (British Council's Writers and their Work series, 1996)
- A Wise Woman: A Memoir of Lavinia Mynors from her Diaries and Letters (1996) [ed.]
- The Wreck of the Abergavenny (2002)

== Honours ==
- Fellow of the Royal Society of Literature, 1962
- Order of the British Empire, 1970
