= William Hayter (diplomat) =

British diplomat

Sir William Hayter KCMG

British Ambassador to the Soviet Union
- In office October 1953 – February 1957
- Monarch: Elizabeth II
- Prime Minister: Sir Winston Churchill; Anthony Eden
- Preceded by: Sir Alvary Gascoigne
- Succeeded by: Sir Patrick Reilly

Personal details
- Born: 1 August 1906 Oxford, England
- Died: 28 March 1995 (aged 88)
- Spouse: Iris Marie Grey (m. 1938)
- Children: Teresa Hayter
- Relatives: Priscilla Napier (sister); Alethea Hayter (sister); Sir John Slessor (cousin)
- Education: Winchester College
- Alma mater: New College, Oxford

Sir William Goodenough Hayter KCMG (1 August 1906 – 28 March 1995) was a British diplomat, Ambassador to the Soviet Union from 1953 to 1957, later Warden of New College, Oxford, and author.

== Early life ==
Born at Oxford, Hayter was the son of Sir William Goodenough Hayter (1869–1924), a judge in Egypt and an adviser to the Egyptian government, and his wife, Alethea Slessor, daughter of a Hampshire clergyman, the Rev. John Henry Slessor, rector of Headbourne Worthy. His sisters, Priscilla Napier (1908–1998) and Alethea Hayter (1911–2006), both went on to become writers. Through his mother, he was a cousin of Marshal of the Royal Air Force Sir John Slessor.

Hayter was educated (like his father) at Winchester College and New College, Oxford, where he was the college's senior classical scholar. At Winchester, he became 'prefect of hall' (or head boy) and his contemporaries included John Sparrow, Richard Crossman, William Empson and Richard Wilberforce. He was at New College with Hugh Gaitskell, Douglas Jay and Herbert Hart, but achieved only a Second in Mods and another in Greats. However, he was awarded a Laming Travelling Fellowship at Queen's College, Oxford, which meant spending nine months learning modern languages overseas. French and German were then both compulsory languages for entrants to the Diplomatic Service, so he spent the nine months in Paris and Vienna. He was then briefly in residence at Queen's before sitting the Foreign Office entrance examination in 1930. He came third, behind Frank Roberts (later British Ambassador in Moscow) but ahead of Duncan Sandys.

== Career ==
On 16 October 1930, Hayter was appointed a Third Secretary in the Diplomatic Service. His first year at the Foreign Office was spent in its League of Nations and Western Department. His next post was in Vienna, from October 1931, where he cultivated the city's high society. From April 1934 to January 1937 he was in Moscow, where Stalin was beginning his purges. He travelled widely in the Soviet Union, visiting Ukraine and Crimea. He went on a trip to the Caucasus with the German ambassador, Count Schulenberg, later executed for taking part in the 20 July plot to kill Hitler. In October 1935, he was promoted Second Secretary.

Moscow was followed by another year in the League of Nations department, and he made a visit to Spain during the Spanish Civil War. In October 1938 Hayter was sent out to the British embassy in China, then accredited to the government of Chiang Kai-shek at war with Japan. In December 1940 he was glad to be posted to Washington as First Secretary. Before long, his colleagues in China were interned by the Japanese. He arrived just before the attack on Pearl Harbor and had the task of reporting it to London. He was soon working closely with the State Department and the American military.

In May 1944, Hayter returned to the Foreign Office in London; he worked in several political departments, then in February 1948 was promoted an assistant under-secretary of state. He attended the Potsdam Conference as secretary to the British delegation and for three years chaired the Joint Intelligence Committee of the chiefs of staff.

In December 1949 he went to Paris as British minister. He was generally sceptical about the prospect of Britain's joining the European Coal and Steel Community, but saw that European collaboration was in British interests.

In October 1953, aged forty-six, and shortly after the death of Stalin, Hayter was appointed ambassador in Moscow, remaining a little over three years until February 1957; this period was later seen as the high point of his career. He took advantage of the new accessibility of the Soviet leadership and proposed to Anthony Eden that Nikolai Bulganin and Nikita Khrushchev should be invited to visit Britain. Eden agreed, the Soviet leaders accepted, and Hayter travelled with them. One blot on his time in Moscow was the (subsequent) exposure of the spy John Vassall, but an inquiry cleared Hayter of negligence. The last year of his mission in Moscow was dominated by the Hungarian Revolution of 1956 and the Soviet invasion which followed it, and by the Suez Crisis, when British and French intentions in Egypt were kept from Hayter and he felt that events hindered the chance of the Soviets withdrawing from Hungary. The Soviets threatened the British over Suez, raising the possibility that they might intervene with rockets, and Hayter made a strong reply.

In 1957, he returned to the Foreign Office in London as political deputy under-secretary of state. A year later, he was offered the headship of his old Oxford college. Disillusioned over Suez, and believing his diplomatic career had an uncertain future, he resigned from the diplomatic service to accept his election as Warden of New College, Oxford, from the Michaelmas term of 1958.

At New College, Hayter took a keen interest in the undergraduates and took on the duties of tutor for admissions. Having no role in teaching or research, he did not seek to be active in the affairs of the wider university beyond his college. However, he wrote several books about diplomacy and Russia, and an autobiography. In 1976, he retired to the village of Stanton St John, near Oxford, and continued to write. He was an Honorary Fellow of New College until his death at Stanton St John on 28 March 1995.

In 1959, the University Grants Committee appointed Hayter Chairman of the Sub-Committee on Oriental, Slavonic, East European and African Studies which it set up to review developments in these fields since the Scarbrough Report was published in 1947. Working between January 1960 and May 1961, the Sub-Committee visited over ten universities in the UK as well as twelve in North America. The final report, usually referred to as the Hayter Report, recommended a significant expansion of research and teaching related to Asia, Eastern Europe and Africa to reflect changes in the world order. Impressed by the area studies model the Sub-Committee saw in the US, it argued that: the main expansion in these studies should be in departments of history, geography, economics and social science rather than in the language departments, though linguistic training remained important; that there should be a better balance between linguistic and non-linguistic studies; and that modern studies should receive greater emphasis compared to classical studies than had hitherto been the case. It suggested significant funding should be provided for a period of ten years to expand provision as it had recommended. The findings of the Hayter Report were largely accepted and acted upon. It led to a significant expansion of provision in these areas, including the establishment of several new centres across the UK.

Hayter was charming and able, but few found real warmth in him. A different side was evident when Sir William was appointed Chairman of the Stanton St John of the SDP. He hosted events such as addresses by Dr David Owen, on at least two occasions, with great warmth and was held in great regard by his team including his Secretary Ben Beaumont. Lady Hayter played a full part in those activities. While still at school he had lost belief in Christianity, but he kept an affection for the Church of England.

=== Other appointments ===
- Fellow of Winchester College, 1958–1976
- Trustee of the British Museum, 1960–1970
- Member of Governing Body of the School of Oriental and African Studies, 1965–1970, 1970–1975, and 1975–1980
- Chair of the Trustees of the Ruskin School of Drawing and Fine Art, Oxford.

== Private life ==
On 19 October 1938 Hayter married Iris Marie Grey (born 1911). Half English and half Swiss, she was the only child of Lieutenant-Colonel Charles Hervey Grey, previously Hoare, and of his first wife, Marie Elizabeth, the widow of Sir Lepel Griffin and the daughter of Ludwig Leupold of Geneva.

They had one daughter, Teresa, born during their Shanghai posting in the Second World War. Teresa Hayter, a debutante of legendary stamina in her day, subsequently attracted early attention for her book Aid as Imperialism (1971), which criticized the lending policies of the World Bank while extolling the North Korean approach to development; she has subsequently campaigned in the fields of international development, migration and racism, and has argued for the elimination of immigration controls.

He died on 28 March 1995, aged 88.

== Honours ==
- Companion of the Order of St Michael and St George, January 1948.
- Knight Commander of the Order of St Michael and St George, 1 May 1953.
- Grand Decoration in Gold with Star for Services to the Republic of Austria (1967)

== Publications ==
- Chiang, Yee, Silent Traveller in Paris, introduction by Sir William Hayter (W. W. Norton & Co., 1956)
- The Diplomacy of the Great Powers (New York: Macmillan, 1961; London: Hamish Hamilton, 1961)
- The Kremlin and the Embassy (London: Hodder & Stoughton, 1966; New York: Macmillan, 1966)
- Russia and the World: A Study of Soviet Foreign Policy (London: Secker & Warburg, 1970, ISBN 0-436-19131-8; New York: Taplinger Publishing Company, Inc., ISBN 0-8008-6935-4)
- William of Wykeham: patron of the arts (London: Chatto and Windus, 1970, ISBN 978-0-7011-1582-1)
- A Double Life: the Memoirs of Sir William Hayter (London: Penguin Books, 1974)
- Spooner: a biography (London: W. H. Allen/Virgin Books, 1977, ISBN 978-0-491-01658-2)

In his The Diplomacy of the Great Powers, Hayter said of US diplomacy: "Americans are not good at the observation of subtle gradations, the long-term calculations, the patient endurance of irremediable inconveniences." He accused the Soviets of "...alienating brutality; an inability to inspire confidence; and above all an almost total, perhaps incorrigible, lack of understanding of the real character, motives, and feelings of the foreign countries and peoples". While he considered French diplomats to be of a "high intellectual order", he found their two basic weaknesses to be an excess of formalism over substance and a lack of discipline.

Diplomatic posts
Preceded by Sir Alvary Gascoigne	British Ambassador to the Soviet Union; 1953–1957	Succeeded by Sir Patrick Reilly
