= Opium and Romanticism =

Debated influence of opium on Romanticism

Opium and Romanticism are well-connected subjects, as readers of Romantic poetry often come into contact with literary criticisms about the influence of opium on its works. The idea that opium has had a direct effect on works of romantic poetry is still under debate; however, the literary criticism that has emerged throughout the years suggests very compelling ideas about opium and its impact on Romantic texts. Usually these criticisms tend to focus on poets such as Samuel Taylor Coleridge, Thomas De Quincey and George Crabbe.

== Overview ==
The Romantic era in Britain was, in addition to a time of growth for literature and poetry, a time of increased opium use. Interspersed among importation of opium from the Middle and Far East countries, Britain itself produced a meager amount of opium and utilized it, at least initially, as medicine and also as an ingredient in patent medicines to treat a variety of ailments and diseases. Given the euphoric and psychologically reinforcing properties of opium, users eventually began consuming it for recreation instead of therapeutic purposes. Its hypothesized effects on visions have been discussed in many theories, one of which was M. H. Abrams', who claims that opium opened up a creative channel, while another was Elisabeth Schneider's argument stating that opium did not inspire visions, but only a daydream-like trance, and Alethea Hayter's position that opium's influences were a combination of the previous two claims.

== Opium during the Romantic Era ==
=== Opium and the Orient ===
The fascination and experimentation with opium occurred partially because of its connections to the oriental tales such as Purchas his Pilgrimage, Travels through Persia, and Memoires du Baron de Tott, sur les Turcs et les Tartares ("Baron de Tott's memoires - on the Turks and the Tartars"), in which opium use was emphatically featured. In the eighteenth century, opium was primarily imported to Britain from countries like Persia, Egypt, Smyrna, and the Levant areas. Opium imports from Turkey dominated in Britain which accounted for 80-90% of the share brought in during the majority of the nineteenth century. Although most of the opium came from the Orient, attempts were made to grow opium in England as an "agricultural improvement."

For a while, opium was used as a currency for trading activities with China, because while other nations had to pay great amounts of silver for tea, British merchants used Indian opium and cotton as a bargaining chip for imports. As importation increased, many patent opium products appeared and were sold in general stores as well as apothecaries. These patent medicines included Godfrey's Cordial, Dalby's Carminative, McMunn's Elixir, Batley's Sedative Solution, and Mother Bailey's Quieting Syrup. As opium functions as an appetite suppresant, children in Britain were sometimes given doses of the drug to quench their appetites. Contemporary observers noted that children who were regularly fed opium were often in very poor health, with a few adults even being charged with killing children through opium poisoning.

=== Medical uses and effects ===
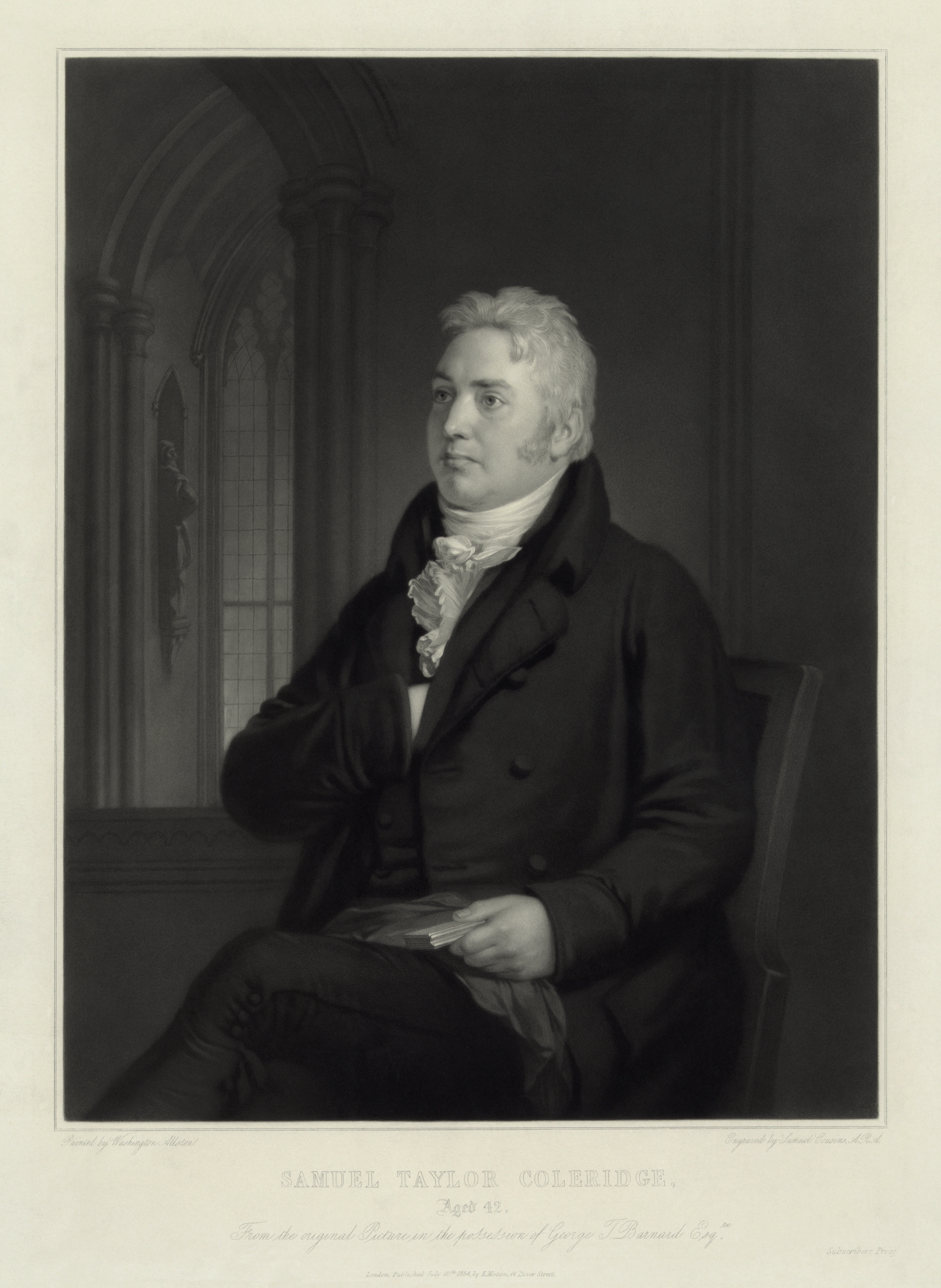
Samuel Taylor Coleridge at age 42, engraving by Samuel Cousins from a portrait by Washington Allston. Digitally restored.

The Swiss alchemist and physician Paracelsus (1493–1541) is often credited as the first to create a tincture of opium. In the 17th century, the English physician Thomas Browne conducted experiments upon the dosage of opium on various animals. Browne's contemporary, the physician Thomas Sydenham (1624–89) the so-called 'Father of British medicine' declared -

Among the remedies which has pleased the Almighty God to give to man to relieve his sufferings, none is so universal and so efficacious as opium .

In the 1730s Dr. Charles Alston in one of his papers describes the biology or botany of the poppy plant, and the experiments he conducted with it on animals. One section of his paper describes how opium was believed to treat pain, cause sleep, increase perspiration, raise the spirits, and relax the muscles. With these things in mind, it was recommended for pain and any sort of irritation to the nerves or motions of spirits. Opium became a popular "aspirin-like" product of the early nineteenth century. George Crabbe was prescribed opium in 1790 to relieve pain, and he continued to use it for the rest of his life. At the time of George Crabbe's first prescription, the East India Company began hiring Indian Villages to cultivate large quantities of opium. Medicinally, it had been used as a reliable cure since the beginning of the medical field. William Cullen and John Brown, two well-known physicians at the time, claimed it cured things such as typhus, cancer, cholera, rheumatism, smallpox, malaria, venereal disease, hysteria, and gout in the eighteenth century. However, some individuals recognized the dangers that opium held. Some wrote into newspapers, such as The Times, and emphasized the dangers of giving a child medication such as the "Syrup of Poppies" or other potent medications, which contained an unspecified amount of opium known to be dangerous to give to infants. A deeper medical analysis revealed that opium created and uplifted spirit and happy disposition, which was then followed by symptoms of a very opposite effect which includes the mind "becoming gradually dull and languid, the body averse to motion, little affected by customary impressions, and inclined to sleep". Following a larger dose, "all these symptoms continue to increase; and tremors, convulsions, vertigo, stupor, insensibility, and deprivation of muscular action appear". Regardless of the mixed reviews in the public sphere, during the time of increasing imports and the unconcern of doctors (especially demonstrated by certain journals documenting how to cultivate the poppy plant and create opium), there were more hard drugs in England than any time before or any time that followed. Eventually, the drug moved beyond medicinal use as its imaginative powers attracted attention—the descriptions accompanying the effects of opium moved from drowsy effects to those of its power over the imagination and thought process. This was especially true within the circle of Romantic poets, specifically Samuel Taylor Coleridge and Thomas De Quincey, who suffered from addiction to opium.

== Influence on literary creation ==
=== Direct inspiration ===
M. H. Abrams argued that opium users during the Romantic era became "inspired to ecstasies" when experiencing opium's effects. It was not assumed that poetry was created during the opium-induced stupor, but that the images that were experienced provided the raw material of the poem, and the poet had to create a surrounding framework to support it. Abrams writes how opium-using poets, "utilized the imagery from these dreams in his literary creations, and sometimes, under the direct inspiration of opium, achieved his best writing." The vividness of the sensory items, the feeling of persecution for eternity, or even the misguided sense of time found within the works of some poets indicates the influences of opium on their dreams and subsequent poems that they built around their dreams. A poet who did not use opium could not gain access to the planet opened solely by the symptoms of using. This unfamiliar realm, known only to users, according to M. H. Abrams, supplied the material for some of the Romantic poet's best and most influential writing.

=== Opium debunked ===
Another direction, more recently postulated by Elisabeth Schneider and in opposition to Abrams, utilizes evidence based on medical and textual evidence. Her idea supposes that the Romantic poet's mind was not affected by opium as it was initially believed to be by critics. While earlier views embodied the idea that opium-induced dreams inspired the production of poetry that was otherwise inaccessible, Schneider's view suggests that literary critics and some physicians who have not specifically studied opiates have an inadequate account of the effects of opium. This occurs partly from a lag in time, but also because of the fallibility of early medical writing on opium. Most of the medical writing on opium, up until the 1920s, was based upon accounts from De Quincey in Confessions of an English Opium-Eater, Coleridge, or from other users. Schneider writes "The relaxation of tension and conflict, accompanied by a sense of pleasant ease, occasionally helps to release for a time the neurotic person's natural powers of thought or imagination or (rarely) of action, though it does not give him powers that he did not have or change the character of his normal powers." Research has suggested that heavy doses of opium in addicts does result in a lengthy day-dream like trance (often reaching what opiate users describe as a "nod", when the user's mind enters a space between waking thought and sleep), and that the euphoria it produces, according to Schneider, merely frees the creativity naturally found within the poet.

=== Opium, real images, and dreaming as a channel ===
A recent argument put forward by Alethea Hayter suggests that opium opens up the individual's mind toward recollecting the raw materials found within one's own life and the dreams, reveries, or hypnagogic visions, and the results are then translated into art. In essence, she states, "the action of opium may reveal some of the semi-conscious processes by which literature begins to be written"—i.e., the act of dreaming (stimulated by opium) crystallizes the past into patterns reflecting truths, and these truths are what inspire the Romantic poetry created by opium users. Everyone is exposed to these everyday images, but opium adds a further dimension to those images. Hayter specifies that while opium may enhance these images into a creative piece of text, ironically it also robs the individual of the power to make use of them, because the images are not easily recalled and recorded when sober. The necessary tools to create work like that of the opium-fuelled Romantic poets therefore must include not only the ability to daydream under the influence of the drug, but also the necessity of being able to communicate those visions on paper later. Hayter's view falls between the two previous literary critiques of opium use during the Romantic era.

== Literary users and their creations ==
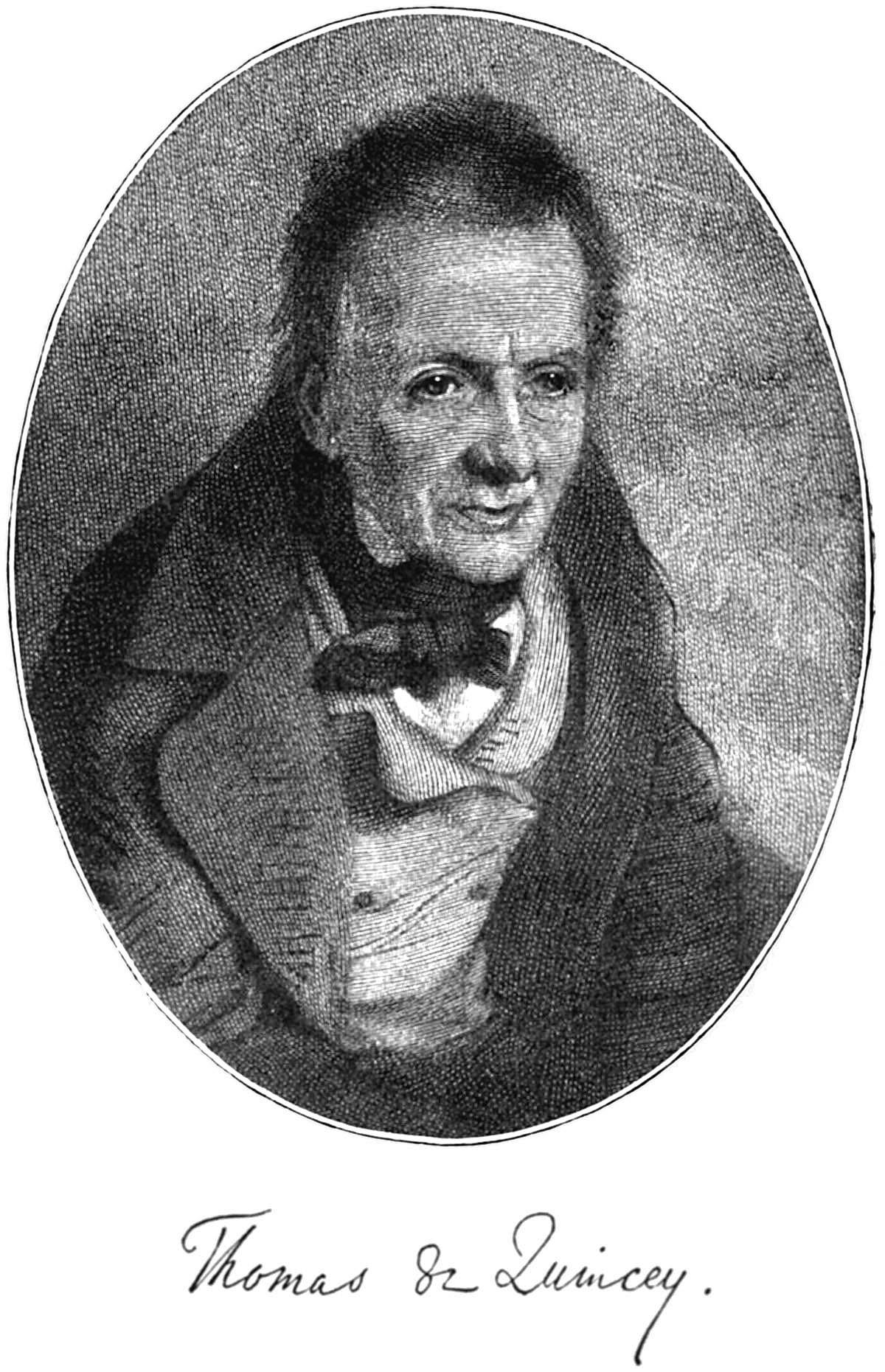
Thomas de Quincey from the frontispiece of De Quincey's Revolt of the Tartars by Charles Sears Baldwin.

Typical use and dependence within the middle-class were not confined to the literary circle, although the records of famous users are more readily available. It has been proven or suggested through letters and notebooks that George Crabbe, Samuel Taylor Coleridge, Thomas de Quincey, Lord Byron, John Keats, and Percy Shelley imbibed on opium, whether for medicinal or recreational uses. In fact, all of the Romantic poets, with the exception of William Wordsworth, appear to have used it at some point. For example, Byron's wife discovered that he had a phial of the Black Drop. Individuals such as Crabbe, Coleridge, De Quincey, Byron, or Keats were most likely even given it as a child to treat some sort of physical ailment.

=== Coleridge ===
Coleridge began using opium in 1791 to relieve rheumatism, but later he believed that opium made his body harmonize with his soul. He was said to have written in a letter to his brother George Coleridge, “Laudanum gave me repose, not sleep; but, you, I believe, know how divine that repose is, what a spot of enchantment, a green spot of fountain and flowers and trees in the very heart of a waste of sands!” There has been much controversy debating if his poems Kubla Khan and Rime of the Ancient Mariner were the results of opium vision.

=== Percy Shelley ===
Percy Shelley was said by scholars to have used opium to alter his state of thinking and free his mind. To "dampen his nerves", Shelley took laudanum, according to letters he wrote, as well as biographies. When Shelley secretively began to become romantically involved with Mary Wollstonecraft Godwin, he started to carry a flask with laudanum in it around to calm his nerves. After Shelley was banned from seeing Mary, he reportedly ran into her house and gave her laudanum, waving a pistol in the air and shouting, "By this you can escape Tyranny. They wish to separate us, my beloved, but death shall unite us." Shelley believed that opium allowed the individual to question societal norms and beliefs while allowing for ideas of radical social change to form. Shelley reportedly used laudanum in a suicide attempt, taking it to free as well as harm himself. Shelley believed opium created confusion for him between cause and effect, as well as between memory and forgetfulness. Shelley began experiencing body spasms and upon visiting his new doctor, Andrea Vacca Berlinghieri, he was warned to stop taking laudanum. Shelley did not heed the doctor's warning and continued to have spasms, haunting dreams, and confusions about reality. Opium use catalyzed Shelley's creativity, but conversely it also detrimentally affected his mental health and well-being.

=== De Quincey's Confessions of an English Opium-Eater ===
De Quincey started using opium as a reliever for a toothache in 1804, and his book, Confessions of an English Opium-Eater, was the first documentation of an opium addict to be published. He focused on the pleasures and the pains along with its influence on his works. His book was often accused of encouraging individuals to try opium and was blamed when they subsequently suffered from its side effects or addiction. With the ability to purchase laudanum easily from many street vendors, de Quincey was quoted, saying, "happiness might now be bought for a penny." With respect to literary triumphs, De Quincey notes in Confessions of an English Opium-Eater how the increased activity in the brain because of opium increased his ability to create new things out of raw material.
