= Teresa Hayter =

British author and activist

Teresa Hayter (born 1940) is a British author and activist. She is the author of several books including Aid as Imperialism, The Creation of World Poverty, and Open Borders: The Case Against Immigration Controls, as well as an early autobiography (penned at age 30) called Hayter of the Bourgeoisie.

== Background and early life ==
Teresa Margaret Hayter was born on 2 April 1940, in Shanghai, China, the daughter of William Hayter (later Sir William and a diplomat representing the United Kingdom in the Soviet Union, who became Warden of New College, Oxford University), and his wife Iris Marie Grey.

Hayter's first book (1971) was autobiographical and was entitled Hayter of the Bourgeoisie.

== Views ==
=== Views on migration controls and refugee rights ===
Hayter has been a vocal campaigner and activist for greater refugee rights and the loosening of migration controls in general. Her book, Open Borders: The Case Against Immigration Controls made general arguments against migration controls and also pointed specifically to the circumstances of refugees. In the book and elsewhere, she has connected her activism for migration rights with her anti-racist views. The book is available for free online and has received some reviews. In addition to her books and media interviews and articles, Hayter has also made the case, in academic journals, for a world without borders.

Hayter is at the helm of a campaign to close down Campsfield House, a detention centre in the United Kingdom.

In March 2007, Hayter refused to share a podium with David Coleman of Migration Watch UK, and supported a petition by local free newspaper, the Oxford Star, calling on the vice chancellor of the university, John Hood, to "consider the suitability of Coleman's continued tenure as a Professor of the University, in light of his opinions and affiliations relating to immigration and eugenics."

=== Aid and poverty ===
Hayter wrote two books on the subject of the world order and its connection to poverty: Aid as Imperialism (1971) and The Creation of World Poverty. In the former, she criticized the lending policies of the World Bank while extolling the development approach of North Korea; the book was reviewed in The Spectator in 1972. The latter book was reviewed by Leading Light.

== Reception ==
Hayter has been interviewed by a number of blogs and websites. She has written a column for The Guardian and has been cited and quoted in The Guardian and other British publications on issues related to asylum seekers and refugees.
