= Susan Chen =

Chinese American contemporary artist

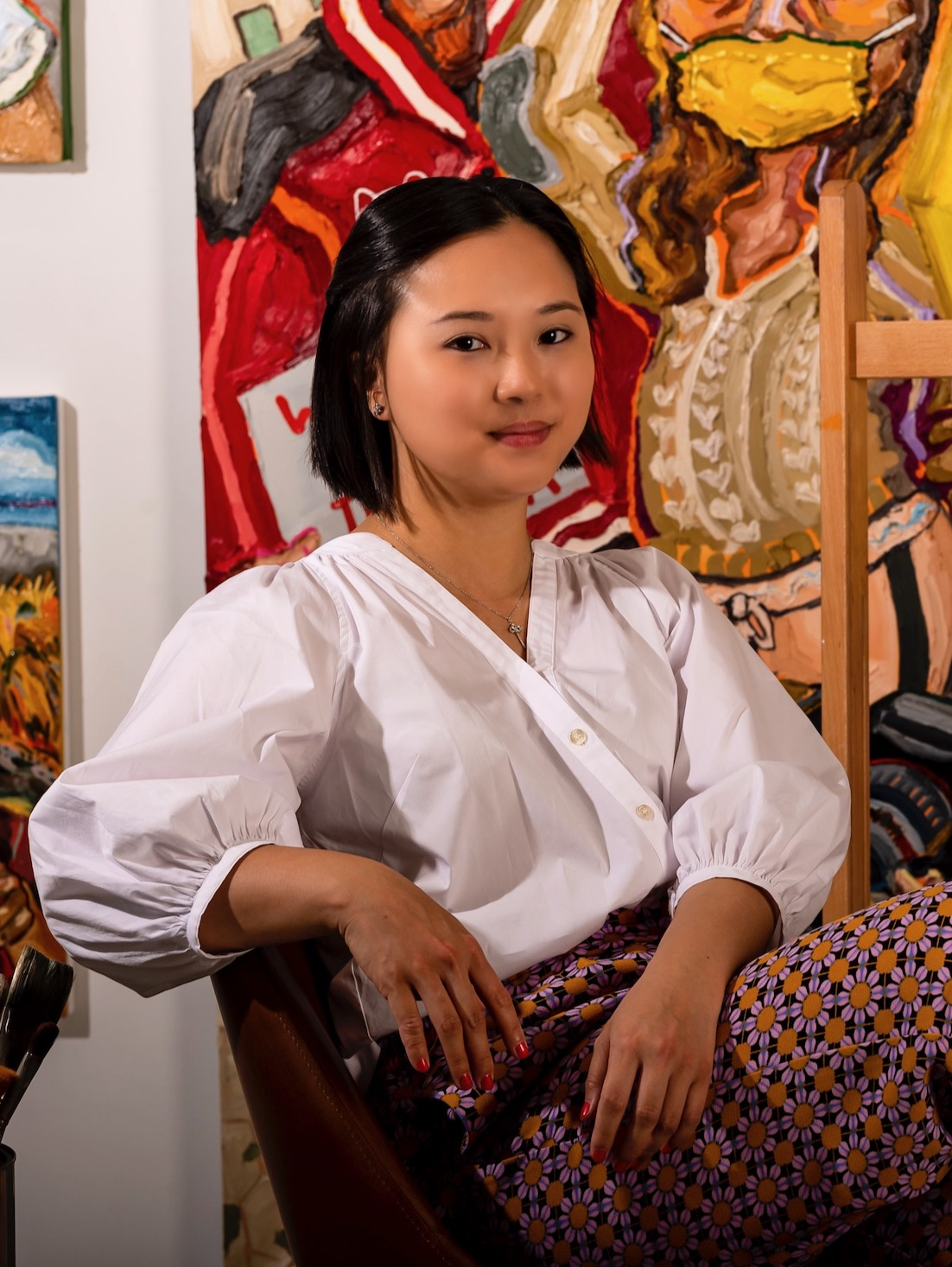
- Chen in 2021
- Born: 1992 (age 33–34); Hong Kong
- Education: Brown University (B.A.); Columbia University (M.F.A.)
- Known for: Painting
- Website: www.susanmbchen.com

Susan Chen (born 1992) is a Chinese American artist and painter based in New York City. Her practice encompasses contemporary community portraiture, autobiographical self-portraits, conceptual still lifes, and landscape paintings. Her work frequently examines themes of identity, belonging, the psychology of race, and social change within the context of the Asian diaspora in the United States.

== Early life and education ==
Born in Hong Kong to parents who worked as factory workers, Chen spent her early childhood on factory grounds. She grew up there during the years preceding the 1997 handover and was later educated throughout her teens in the United Kingdom at Downe House School, an all-girls boarding school in England which she attended on a scholarship.

Chen later relocated to the United States for higher education, earning a Bachelor of Arts with honors from Brown University and a Master of Fine Arts from Columbia University School of the Arts. While at Brown, she attended her first oil painting class during her junior year.

== Work ==
Susan Chen's early work focused on highlighting stories within the Asian diaspora and Asian American community. In 2020, Chen presented her inaugural solo exhibition at Meredith Rosen Gallery, receiving a review from art critic John Yau titled "A Powerful Debut." The exhibition featured thirteen paintings depicting Asian Americans from Chen's neighborhood and online connections, including portraits of family and friends, self-portraits, and a group of Asian American students on Columbia University's campus. The paintings explored topics related to the Asian American diaspora, including stereotypes, the model minority myth, racial melancholia, and the complexities of assimilation.

Her exhibition 'I Am Not A Virus' at Night Gallery in 2021 featured a series of seventeen collaborative Zoom portraits reflecting on the anti-Asian hate crimes that occurred across America during the pandemic.

Susan Chen's artwork, titled 'I Am Not the Kung Flu,' was featured on the cover of New York Magazine from September 26–October 9, 2022 in the issue, "At Home in Asian America: Who Are We Becoming?". The piece, originally part of Chen's 2021 exhibition 'I Am Not a Virus,' is one of several paintings created by Chen over Zoom during the pandemic. The self-portrait depicts the artist wearing a mask, a post-vaccine Band-Aid, Zoom emoticons, and items associated with self-defense, including pepper sprays, a taser, pepper gel gun, a whistle, and a Feng Shui Bagua mirror.

In 2022, Chen collaborated with New York City Chinatown non-profit community groups, including Chinatown Block Watch and Apex for Youth to document them into oil painting group portraits. The painting Chinatown Block Watch (2022) was displayed at Jeffrey Deitch gallery as part of the exhibition 'Wonder Women,' curated by Kathy Huang. The latter painting was exhibited at The Aldrich Museum in the feminist exhibition, "52 Artists: A Feminist Milestone," curated by Amy Smith-Stewart.

In 2023, Chen presented a series of Purell bottle still lifes at Rachel Uffner Gallery. The show featured eleven works, including two Purell Clocks in soft pastels and oil paintings and charcoal drawings of Purell bottles. In John Yau's exhibition review titled, "The Many Lives of a Purell Bottle," comparisons were drawn between her drawings and the style of Philip Guston. During the exhibition, a triptych of her paintings were stolen from the gallery in an art heist.

Susan Chen's 2024 solo exhibition "Plan B" at Rachel Uffner Gallery showcased the artist's debut ceramics alongside six large-scale group portraits. The paintings were created through live portrait-painting sessions with 39 individuals, reflecting Chen's process with community engagement. The works used social commentary to address topics from the personal to political, including women's reproductive rights and activism. In a review for Whitewall Magazine, art critic Sarah Bochicchio noted the effectiveness of Chen's ceramic installations, including oversized Purell bottles, Plan B and Tampax boxes, in conveying the urgency of everyday items. Bochicchio also highlighted the depiction of the aftermath of the overturning of Roe v. Wade in Chen's paintings, emphasizing the role of support networks and shared experiences among women. The exhibition was profiled in Artnet's "Up Next" column by Katie White and listed among the "8 Shows by Women Artists to Watch This Month" in March 2024 by Cultured Magazine.

Chen collaborated with Art for Change in 2025 to release a series of limited-edition, hand-embellished prints to benefit the Brooklyn Museum. The release was commissioned on the occasion of the annual Brooklyn Artists Ball, a fundraising gala presented by Dior.

Chen's artistic practice expanded from portraiture to en plein air landscape painting with her 2026 solo exhibition, Old Cape Cod, at Night Gallery. Art critic Charles Moore noted this body of work examines the mutable New England shoreline as a site for exploring ecological precarity, themes of belonging, and the politics of place.

=== Influences ===
In Chen's painting, Streetcars of Desires (2020), she references some of her early influences by incorporating the surnames of artists into mini boxcars. These artists include her professors Richard Hull, Gregory Amenoff, Susanna Coffey, Aliza Nisenbaum, and painters well known in art history like Hockney, Matisse, Bonnard, Burchfield, Soutine, and Le Pho. Chen appreciates the still lifes and flower paintings of Jean-Baptiste-Siméon Chardin and Lê Phổ. She briefly worked as Shara Hughes's artist assistant in 2016.

=== Recognition ===
The artist has received various recognitions for her work, including being listed as a Forbes 30 Under 30 2022 Art & Style honoree, inclusion in the Artsy Vanguard 2022 list, an Artist-in-Residence at Silver Art Projects at the World Trade Center (2021–2022), and receiving the Fall 2020 Hopper Prize. In 2025, Chen was awarded a Creative Capital Grant, one of 15 Visual Arts recipients selected from 5,653 applications. The selection process involved extensive reviews by 120 industry leaders and concluded with discipline-specific final panels.

== Collectors and market ==
Susan Chen's early collectors include museum board members Pamela and David Hornik, Carla Shen, Joel Lubin, and Italian collectors behind The Underdog Collection. In the artist's auction debut at Phillips New Now in New York on March 8, 2023 the artwork sold for $35,560, exceeding its estimate. Her debut solo exhibitions in New York and Los Angeles were sold out.

== Solo exhibitions ==
- 2026: Old Cape Cod at Night Gallery
- 2024: Plan B at Rachel Uffner Gallery
- 2023: Purell Night & Day at Rachel Uffner Gallery
- 2021: I Am Not A Virus at Night Gallery
- 2020: On Longing at Meredith Rosen Gallery
