= Order of Silence =

Order of Silence (The White Ladies)
- Predecessor: School of Silence, Kensington, London
- Successor: Community of Christian Contemplatives, Burton Bradstock
- Established: 1912
- Founder: Adela Curtis
- Dissolved: 1921
- Type: Christian Community
- Location: Cold Ash, Berkshire, United Kingdom
- Coordinates: 51.4373°N 1.2737°W
- Staff: 25

The Order of Silence (also known as The White Ladies) was a small Christian community based in Cold Ash, Berkshire between 1912 and 1921.

Members of the order were exclusively women, who were required to dress simply, often in white veils and robes. This led to members of the order becoming known as The White Ladies. Twenty-five members of staff worked at the community. Visitors were able to attend lectures on mysticism for a small fee.

The organisation was focused on self-sufficiency, with members spending time gardening and cooking as well as making clothes. They were expected to be guided by the Bible in their day-to-day activities, as well as maintaining silence.

== History ==
The Order of Silence was founded by Adela Curtis (1867–1960), who came to England from Japan in 1870. Curtis first established the School of Silence in Kensington, London in 1907 before moving on to establish the Order of Silence in Cold Ash in 1912. Curtis was somewhat influenced by the New Thought movement. Some of her sermons, lectures and published works are available from archives.

The community in Cold Ash consisted of buildings and land adjacent to Hermitage Road, notably The Cloisters (designed by James MacLaren Ross), Ancren Gate (an Anchorite house where Curtis lived, built in 1914) and 60 acres (24 ha) of land for farming and gardening.

In 1921, due to Curtis's deteriorating health and the Order's precarious financial situation, the site at Cold Ash was sold to Olive Willis to become the new premises for Downe House School. The pupils moved to the new site at Easter 1922.

The Order of Silence community was subsequently relocated to St. Bride's farm, Burton Bradstock, Dorset, becoming the Community of Christian Contemplatives. This new community, composed of many former members of the Order of Silence, built a small collection of wooden cottages and a chapel (completed in 1938), all without electricity or piped water. Curtis was the last of the White Ladies to live at St Bride's farm, and she died there aged 92 in 1960. The buildings, chapel and community were taken over after her death by Norman Motley who had formed the Othona community and retreat in Essex in 1946.

The Othona Community continues to exist today as a non-denominational community based upon a Christian heritage, both near Burton Bradstock and in Essex where it was founded.
