= Site of the Claudian invasion of Britain =

Historical location, subject of debate

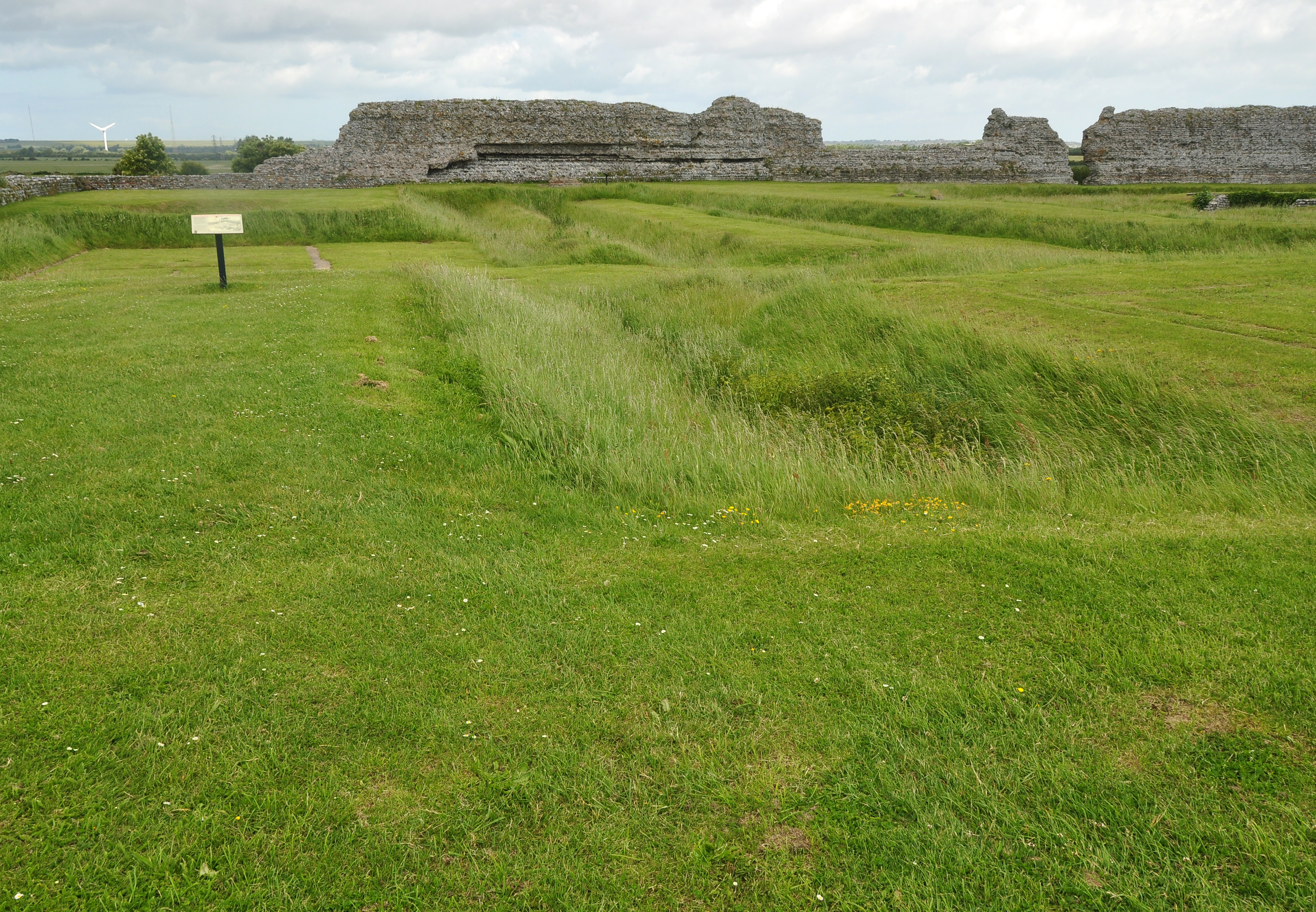
Claudian earthworks at Richborough Fort

The site of the Claudian invasion of Britain in AD 43 has been a matter of academic debate. Although it is generally believed that the force left from Gesoriacum (Boulogne), it is possible that part of the fleet sailed from near the mouth of the Rhine. Rutupiæ (Richborough, on the east coast of Kent) has earthworks that defended a bridgehead dating from this period and is often stated as the site of the landing, though there are plausible arguments in favour of a landing further west along the south coast of Britain.

The only ancient detailed account of the invasion comes from Cassius Dio's Roman History, written in the early 3rd century. He states that the main invasion force under Aulus Plautius sailed in three divisions, and George Patrick Welch argues that there were three landing sites in Kent: Lympne furthest west (the Legio II Augusta under Vespasian), Dover in the centre (the Legio XX Valeria Victrix under an unknown commander) and Richborough in the east (the IX Hispana and XIV Gemina under the overall command of Plautius). The three divisions would have then advanced from the coast and met at the River Medway.

Other ancient historians indicate that the Romans may not have landed in Kent. Dio describes how the troops saw a shooting star whilst at sea and were cheered by this omen. He adds that it travelled from east to west and that this was the direction the Romans were sailing in. However, a voyage from Boulogne to Kent sails from south to north.

Taking Boulogne as the point of departure, historians such as John Morris and J. G. F. Hind have used Dio's account to suggest a landing point much further west along the south coast of Britain, around the Solent or Southampton Water. This is supported by Dio's stated reason for the Roman invasion, that Verica, the king of the Atrebates who lived in the area of modern-day Hampshire, had appealed for Roman assistance after he was expelled in a coup, and by Suetonius's assertion that Vespasian conquered the Isle of Wight.

Similarly Dio writes of an early victory when the Romans received the surrender of a tribe he calls the "Bodunni". No tribe of this name is known, but it is very similar to that of the Dobunni who occupied Gloucestershire. In this case, a landing point in the region of Chichester or Portsmouth might be expected.

The remains of military storehouses dating to the appropriate period have been found under Fishbourne Roman Palace, a 1st-century Roman villa near Chichester and, on the basis of this, and other archaeological evidence, archaeologist Barry Cunliffe, formerly a proponent of the Kent hypothesis, has stated that he was becoming persuaded by the arguments in favour of a South Coast landing.

Other historians argue that, as the Roman invasion fleet may have numbered as many as 1,000 ships, mostly slow and ungainly troop transports, its commanders would have wanted to minimise the time spent at sea because of the risk of contrary winds, and that this favours the short route to Kent rather than the longer journey up the Channel to the Solent. Richborough had a large natural harbour (long since silted up) which would have provided a suitable anchorage for the landing (though its capacity to hold more than a small part of the fleet has been questioned). Defensive ditches dating to the period of the invasion and likely protecting a beachhead were excavated in 2001 and 2008. There is also evidence at Richborough of a ceremonial arch, which may have commemorated Richborough's role in the invasion, but as the arch was not constructed until c AD 80, by which time Rutupiæ was the major port of entry into Britain from the continent, its relation to the events of the invasion is uncertain.

The British defence was led by Caratacus and Togodumnus of the Catuvellauni, an eastern kingdom with influence over Kent, and the Romans' immediate objective seems to have been to secure a crossing of the River Thames in order to reach the territory of the Catuvellauni. The Dobunni, who Dio says were tributaries of the Catuvellauni, could have sent troops eastwards to their aid, who then surrendered to Plautius in Kent. In this scenario, Vespasian's western conquests could have taken place after the Thames crossing was secured.

According to Suetonius, Claudius sailed from Boulogne, and it is usually assumed that the main force under Plautius sailed from the same place, but it is possible that Plautius's forces sailed from the mouth of the Rhine, which Strabo names as a point of departure used for crossings to Britain in the early 1st century; ships commonly sailed along the coast of Belgic Gaul to the territory of the Morini, before taking a relatively short open-sea crossing to Britain. This would account for the westward journey in Dio's account. On the other hand, if the Rhine was the point of departure, and if the Catuvellauni were Plautius's objective, it could be argued that a landing south of the Thames would have been unnecessary and have entailed as much risk as a landing north of the river.

The three divisions mentioned by Dio also leave open the possibility that, while the main landing was in Kent, part of the force sailed to the Solent to aid Verica, or vice versa. Dio, of course, wrote about 150 years after the event, and his sources are unknown; the details of his account are uncorroborated and may be unreliable.

== See also ==
- Julius Caesar's invasions of Britain − Discussing the two different Julian invasions, and the thinking behind each launch location site
- Itius Portus − Controversy involving the second Julian invasion launch location
- Roman conquest of Britain
