= Cold Ash Quarry =

Protected area in Berkshire, England

- Site of Special Scientific Interest
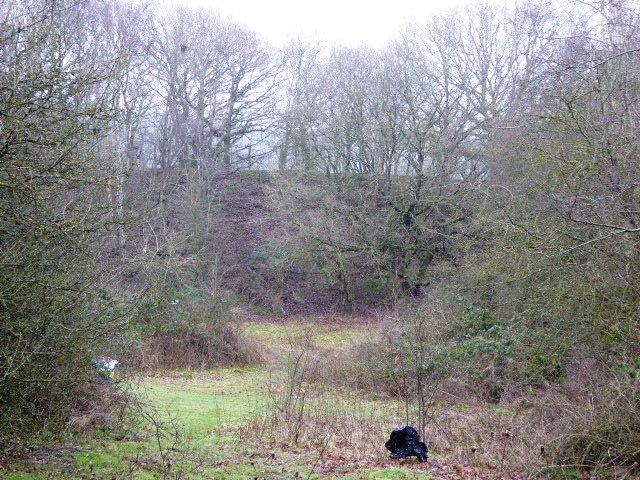
- View towards Cold Ash Quarry
- Location of Cold Ash Quarry.
- Area of search: Berkshire
- Grid reference: SU 500 714
- Coordinates: 51.439°N 1.282°W
- Interest: Geological
- Area: 0.4 hectares (0.99 acres)
- Notification date: 1984
- Location map: Magic Map

Cold Ash Quarry is a 0.4-hectare (0.99-acre) geological Site of Special Scientific Interest north of Newbury in Berkshire, England. It is a Geological Conservation Review site.

The quarry is unique in Britain for the collection of fossil plants and insects which occur in a layer of silt and clay within the Reading Beds. The fossils date to about 60 million years ago. The fossil flora consists of well-preserved angiosperm leaves; in some of these fossils, there is evidence of the activity of contemporary leaf-miner insects. This is the only location in Britain at which fossil leaf-miner activity has been discovered.

The site is private land with no public access.
