= Richborough Castle =

Roman fort in Kent, England

Richborough Fort
- Rutupiæ
- Richborough, Kent in England
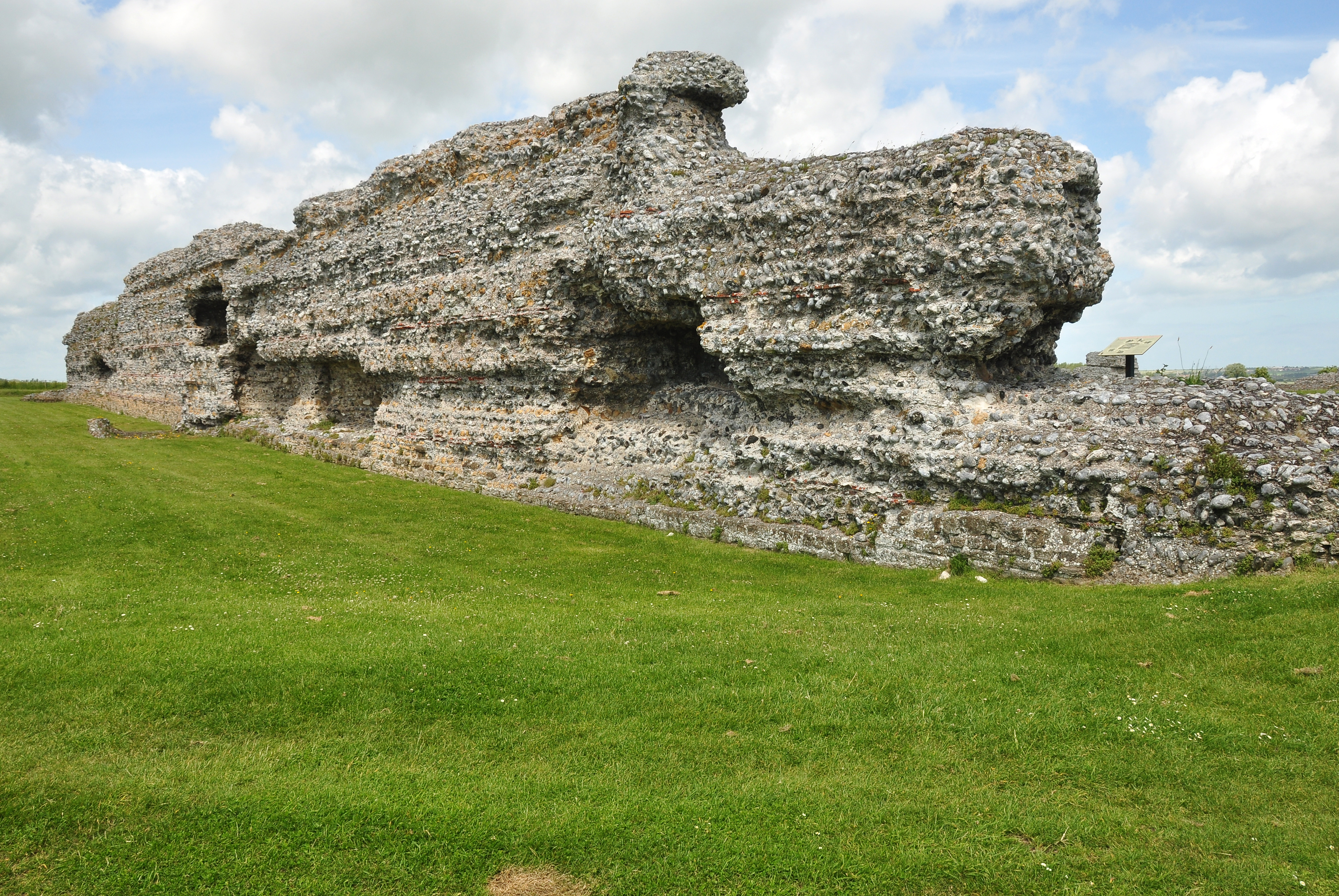
- The walls of Richborough Roman Fort

Site information
- Type: Roman fort

Location
- Location within Kent
- Coordinates: 51.294°N 1.332°E
- Grid reference: TR324602

Richborough Castle is a Roman Saxon Shore fort better known as Richborough Roman Fort. It is situated in Richborough near Sandwich, Kent. Substantial remains of the massive fort walls still stand to a height of several metres.

It is part of a larger Roman town called Rutupiae or Portus Ritupis that developed around the fort and the associated port. The settlement was founded after the Roman conquest of Britain in AD 43. Because of its position near to a large natural harbour in the Wantsum Channel and to the mouth of the Stour, Rutupiae served as a main gateway to Roman Britain and the starting point for the road now known as Watling Street. The site is now 2 1/2 miles inland from the current coastline.

Earth fortifications were first dug on the site in the 1st century, probably for a storage depot and bridgehead for the Roman army. The site expanded into a major civilian and commercial town, and the stone Saxon Shore fort was added around the year 277. The later fort is believed to have been constructed by the rebel Carausius. The site is now under the care of English Heritage.

Map of the Roman port and town of Rutupiae (Richborough). The map shows the three broad phases of occupation, which are:
1. AD 43 - arrival of Claudius's invasion fleet. A long earthwork parallel to the then shoreline gave a protected area to bring troops and supplies ashore.
2. From AD 43 to AD 250 - Busy port town of Rutupiae. A sizable town grew up around the Triumphal arch through which arrivals and departures would pass.
3. From AD 250 - Legionary base. A small fort was built and in AD 275 expanded as a larger stone-built 'Saxon Shore Fort'
The Roman Legions departed in AD 410 and some time later the east wall collapsed due to coastal erosion/slumping. In the Middle Ages the Wantsum Channel silted up and Richborough found itself several miles from the modern coastline.

== Etymology ==
The meaning of the name Rutupiae is uncertain, although the first element may derive from the British Celtic *rutu- meaning "rust; mud" (cf. Welsh rhwd). An alternative attested name for the fort, Ritupiae, may represent a clearer British form, containing the word *ritus "ford" (Welsh rhyd), referring to a crossing point between the then island and the mainland. The meaning of the -piae element remains unknown.

== History ==
=== Roman Invasion ===
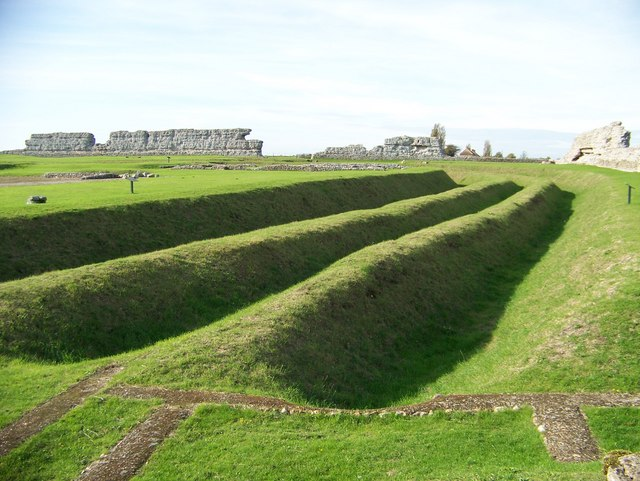
Ditch defences from the c250 AD earthworks, inside the later stone-built fort

Richborough was probably the landing site for the Claudian invasion in 43 AD as the first defensive barrier dating from this period has been discovered at the site in the form of twin V-shaped ditches of at least 650 m length and parallel to the Roman coastline. These would have protected the invasion beachhead and supply depot. The crossing would have exploited one of the shortest routes over the English Channel. However, other explicit details on the site of the Claudian invasion have not survived and its location is a matter of scholarly debate.

In Roman times the broad Wantsum Channel separated the Isle of Thanet from mainland Britain and Rutupiae is thought to have guarded the channel.

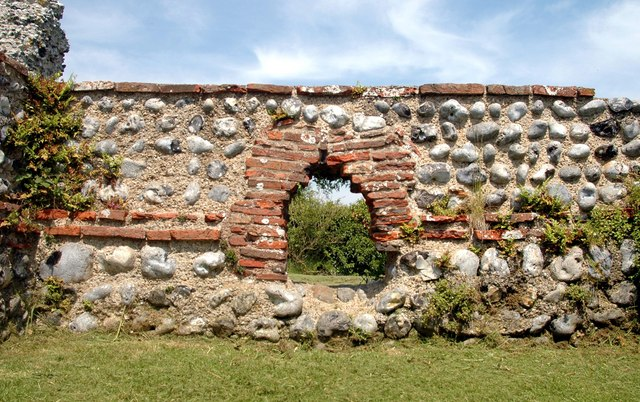
Cellar wall from The mansio

=== Civilian town ===
Richborough was a military port and supply base. For most of the period of Roman rule it was the main port of entry for imports into Britain. The town was widely regarded throughout the Roman Empire for the quality of its oysters. They are mentioned as on a par with those from the Italian Lucrine Lake in Juvenal. "Rutupine shore" was used as a common metonymy for Britain in Latin writers.

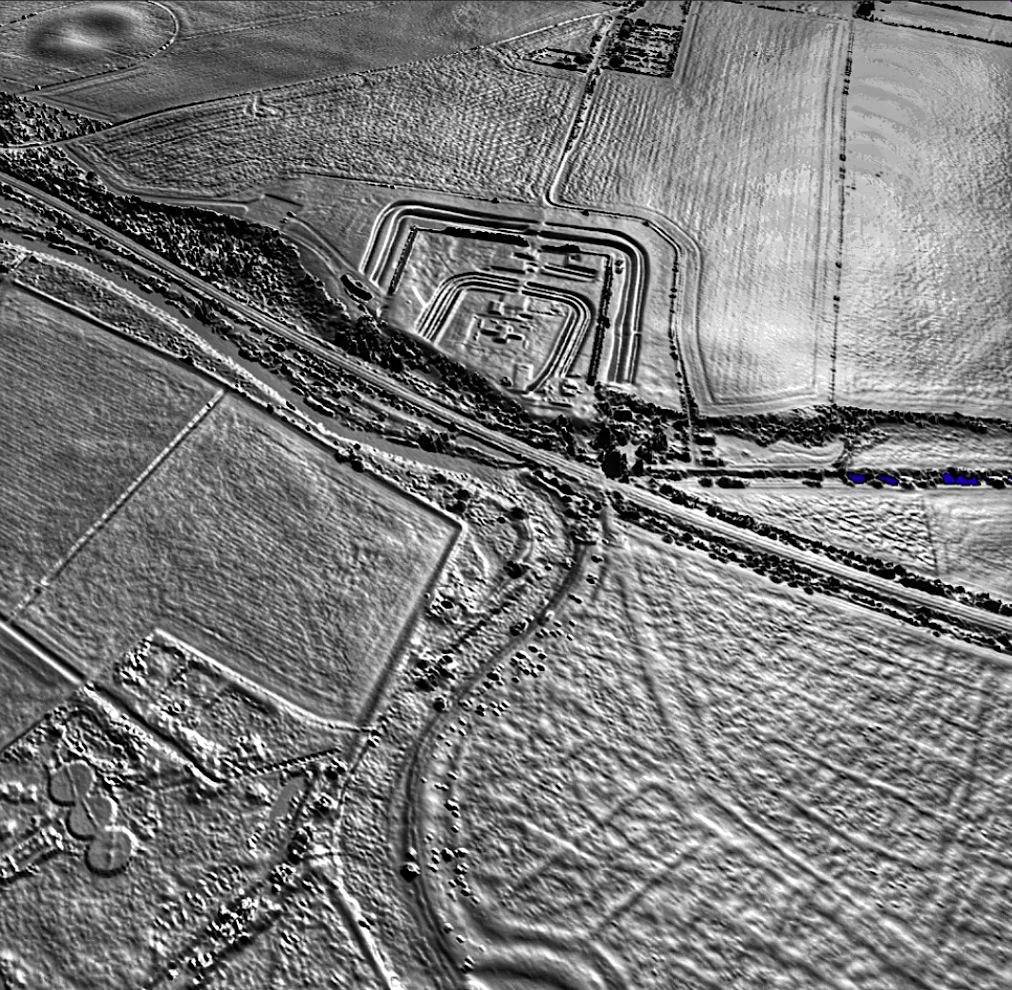
A lidar view of Richborough Roman fort: a small square-shaped military camp (AD 250s) inside the larger and slightly offset square of the Saxon Shore Fort (AD 275), marked by the outline of ditches, partially affected by shore collapse, and an amphitheatre (the circular shape in the top-left) at the site of the settlement of Rutupiae in Kent. The River Stour runs horizontally across the image.

=== Triumphal arch ===
A major quadrifrons triumphal arch, one of the biggest in the Roman Empire, was erected in about AD 85 straddling Watling Street, the main road from Richborough to London. Its position and size suggest it may have been built to celebrate the final conquest of Britain after Agricola's victory at the Battle of Mons Graupius. Almost 25 m (82 ft) high, it had a façade of high-quality Italian granite and was adorned with sculptures and inscriptions, and must have been built by the Emperor. Standing as it did between the port and the province, passage through the arch signified formal entry into Britannia (cf the similarly maritime Arch of Trajan at Ancona in Italy). Only the foundations and mound of the Richborough arch are still visible. It was demolished by the Romans themselves, apparently to provide building materials for the later Saxon Shore fort on the site.

=== Saxon Shore fort ===
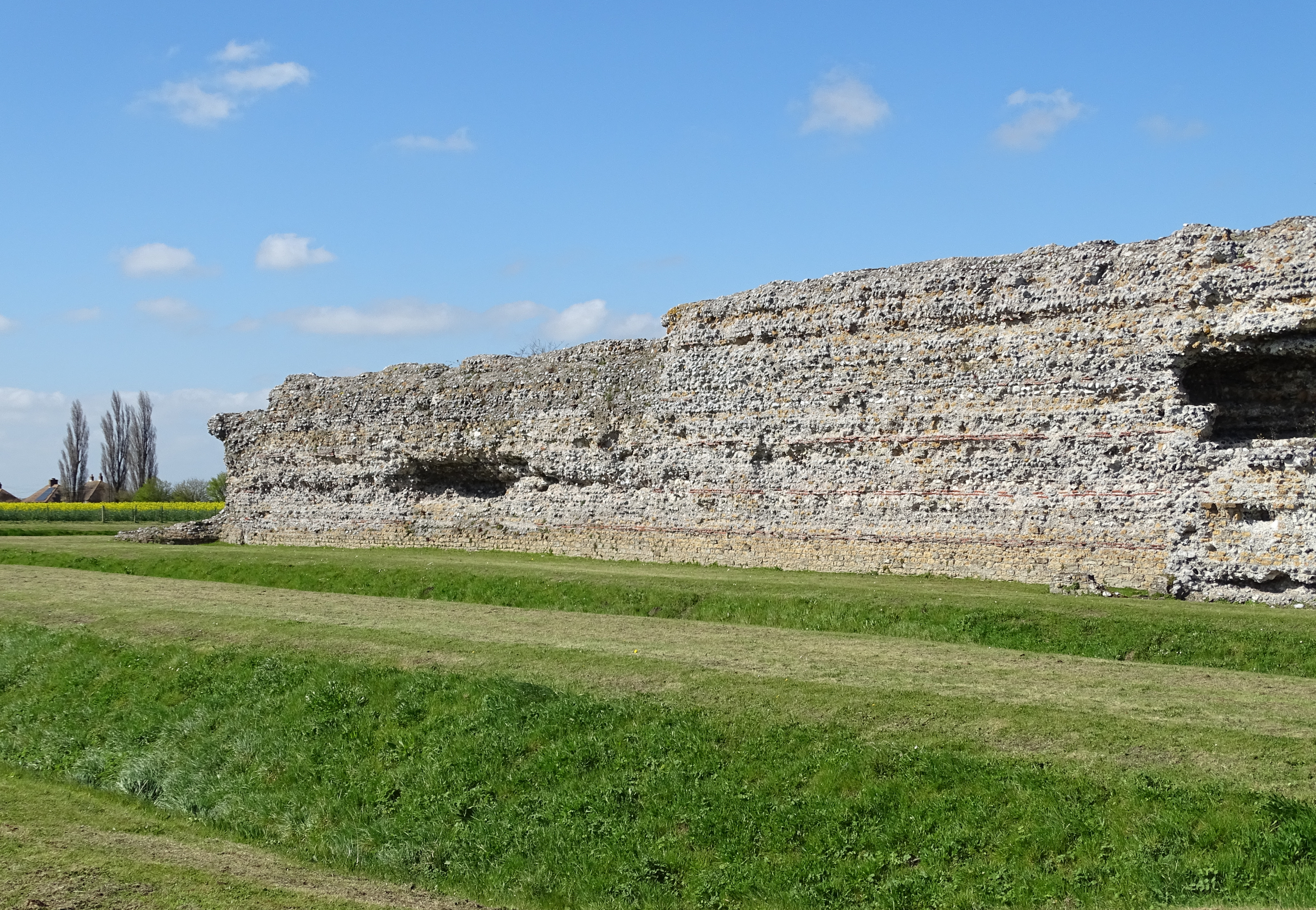
Fort South Wall

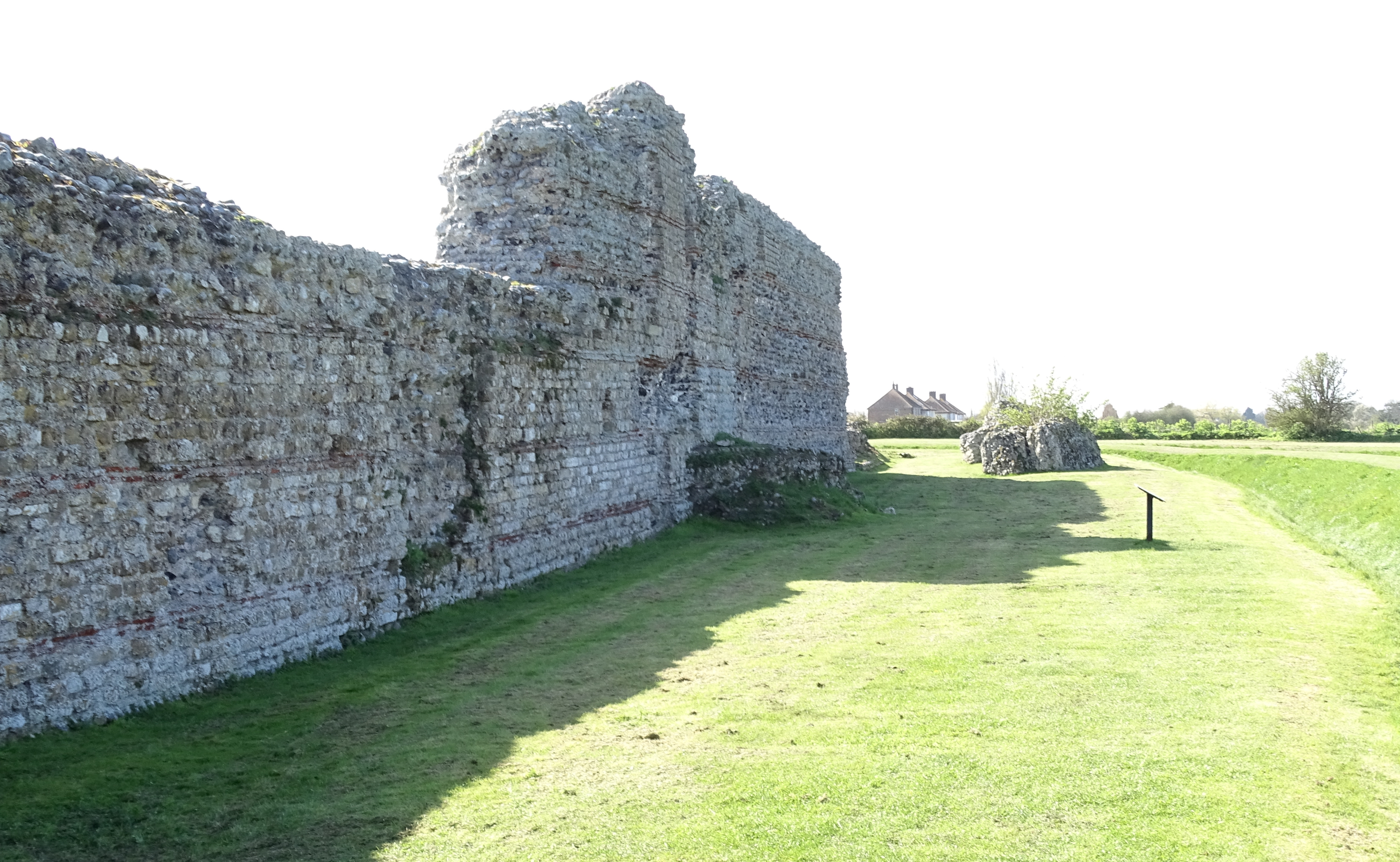
Fort west wall

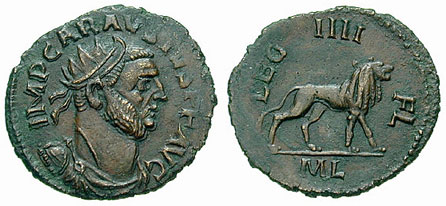
A Carausian coin (c. 290) of the same type as those found at Richborough

During the late 3rd century this (by now large) civilian town was re-militarised by the conversion of part of it into a so-called Saxon Shore fort, a series of forts built by the Romans along the Channel on the English and French coasts possibly to guard against invading Saxon pirates. Construction of the fort here is believed to have started in 277 and been completed in 285. This involved the demolition and reuse as spolia of the triumphal arch, and numismatic evidence suggests it occurred during the reign of Carausius.

The fort was 5 acres (2.0 ha) in area and was surrounded by massive walls, forming an almost perfect square. However, the north and south walls were constructed differently. The north wall was built by separate gangs of labourers, while the south wall seems to have been built as a single unit, suggesting that the north wall was built after the south wall. In some places, the walls reached over 25 feet (8 m) in height, and were built of small ashlar and double-tile courses. The main entrance of the fort was in the west wall. The walls stand to a great height and were of such high quality that they only recently needed repointing.

In the interior of the fort most buildings were of timber though some were stone. A stone central rectangular building was probably the principia (headquarters) and there were also small, stone-built baths.

=== Amphitheatre ===
An amphitheatre has been visible as a hummock, roughly a 5 minutes' walk from the main site. It had a capacity of 5000 spectators. Excavations in 2021 have revealed that the amphitheatre and the settlement are likely to have continued in use from the invasion to the end of Roman rule in the early 5th century. The arena walls used chalk block from local quarries and were plastered and painted vivid red and blue, the first for any Roman amphitheatre in Britain. A carcer, or cell, with walls almost 2 m high, used to hold wild animals, criminals or gladiators before entry in the arena was also found.

=== Church at Richborough ===
There exists an unexplained structure at Richborough that is believed to be a font. Today, this structure is almost entirely destroyed. The hexagonal font discovered during the excavations at Richborough suggests that baptisms could have been a function of this church. The church was probably built at the end of the 4th century or at the beginning of the 5th century. It seems plausible that the church was built of wood.

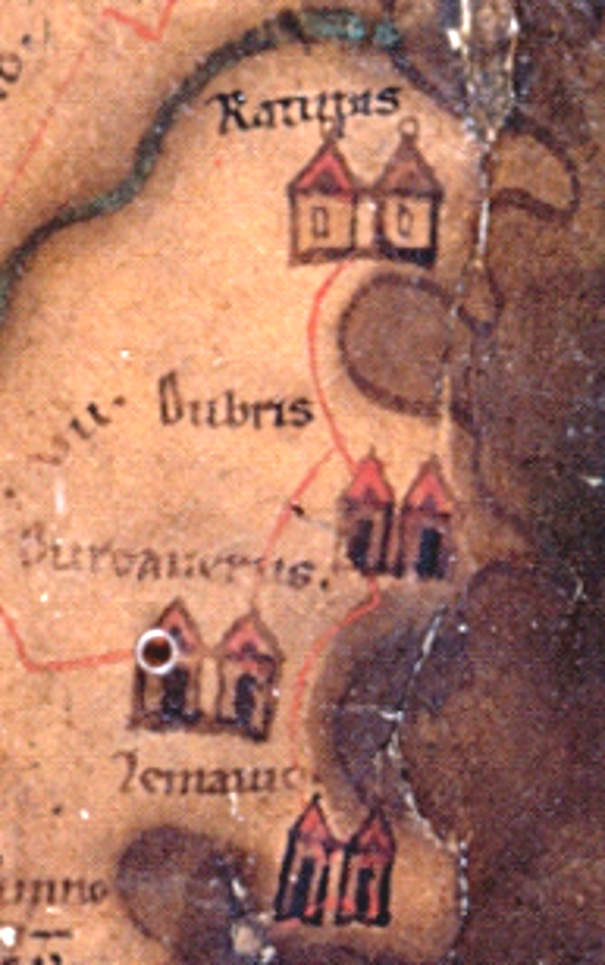
Roman Richborough at the top of an extract from the 4th century Peutinger Map. Dover (Dubris) is below it.

=== Roman withdrawal ===
During the decline of the Roman Empire, Richborough was eventually abandoned by the Romans, after Roman troops from across Britain departed from this and the other Roman ports. Coastal or river erosion subsequently undermined the eastern part of the stone walls, causing a massive collapse along the walls facing the shore. It is not known how long the civilian population continued living in the area, but the site was later occupied by a Saxon religious settlement, and a 10th century chapel of St Augustine was built close to the area where the wall had already collapsed. By the 16th and 17th centuries the Wantsum Channel was rapidly silting up, so that Richborough lost its access to the sea. It now lies some 2 miles from the coast, making it hard to imagine that this was once a central link between Roman Britain and the rest of the Empire, and the place where Claudius arrived with his ships and legions

== Rediscovery and Excavations ==
The substantial Roman walls fascinated early antiquarians from the 16th century, although the full history and significance of the site eluded them. In 1776 the amphitheatre was identified by William Stukeley, one of only three known in Britain at the time. In 1849 excavations on the amphitheatre discovered a skeleton suggesting the site later became a cemetery. Excavations continued in 1900. and the large platform in the centre of the walled fort was a source of much speculation. In 1843 Mr Rolfe's workmen had spent two weeks trying to dig through the foundations in the hope of finding a chamber beneath, but found only solid masonry. Later excavation attempts confirmed it was a platform for an above-gound structure such as a lighthouse or signal tower. Bushe-Fox's excavations in the 1920s and 30s established that it had been clad in Carerra marble, but it took until Barry Cunliffe's analysis in the 1960s to finally identify that it had supported a four-way triumphal arch, as part of a ceremonial route for troops arriving at the port and marching out onto Watling Street.

A major campaign of excavations was made between 1922 and 1938 by J.P. Bushe-Fox. This helped to establish the different phases of use and occupation. The long north-south double-banked earthwork was shown to be the earliest feature, although it would be some time before it was known that this represented the very first moment of Claudius's invasion of AD 43. The excavations also showed that the occupation had continued over the next 400 years, and produced artifacts from around the Roman world, many of which are now on display in the on-site museum. By the end of Bushe-Fox's excavations the layout and appearance of the site was substantially as it remains now. In the post-war period it fell to Barry Cunliffe to draw together the results of all the excavations and in 1968 he produced the Fifth Report on the Excavation at the Roman Fort at Richborough, Kent.

Many questions of course remained unanswered. The extent of the Roman town has been almost entirely untested archaeologically. Aerial photos and later geophysical surveys have shown it extended over much of the former island, of which the port and fort are on the eastern edge. Two other areas of uncertainty were the location of the port, and the alignment of the eastern wall of the fort. Both of these questions were complicated by the large area of landslip that left a tumble-down section of overturned wall, coupled with the silting up of the former Wantsum Channel and the construction of a railway line. Excavations carried out in late 2008 at the 90 m (300 ft) line of fallen wall demonstrated that the 9 massive lengths of massonry had not just fallen over but had overturned and now lay with their bottom-most courses higher than the top. This indicates substantial movement down the slope, demonstrating that the original line of the wall was much further west than had been surmised up to that point, and could be shown to have stood on a line of massive foundations previously classed as 'abandoned'. This made it a square, rather than rectangular fort, closer in appearance to the other Saxon Shore Forts. Test-excavations below the fallen wall also uncovered a few metres of the original Roman coastline along with the remains of a medieval dock. By showing just how close the Roman beach and port were to the town, this also helped confirm that the 43AD earthworks were a beachhead defence, protecting around 700 m (2,300 ft) of coast during Claudius's invasion.

Excavations from 2021 have focussed on the amphitheatre situated 300 m south west of the fort, where unique painted walls have been found.

=== New buildings ===
In 2023 a replica wooden Roman gateway was built near the centre of the Roman fort, on the precise site of the Claudian gateway of 43 AD. From the top of the structure there are views all round the surrounding walls, and in good weather as far afield as Reculver to the north, the site of Regulbium, another Roman Saxon Shore fort.

In addition, the on-site museum has been refurbished to display some of the many finds from Richborough, a location which saw both the very beginning and the very end of Roman rule in Britain.

== In popular culture ==
The American Russell Hoban repurposed Richborough Castle as "Roaming Rune" (alluding to its Roman origins) in his 1980, post-apocalyptic novel Riddley Walker.
