= Tedworth Square =

Garden square in the Royal Borough of Kensington and Chelsea

Coordinates: 51°29′14″N 0°09′46″W

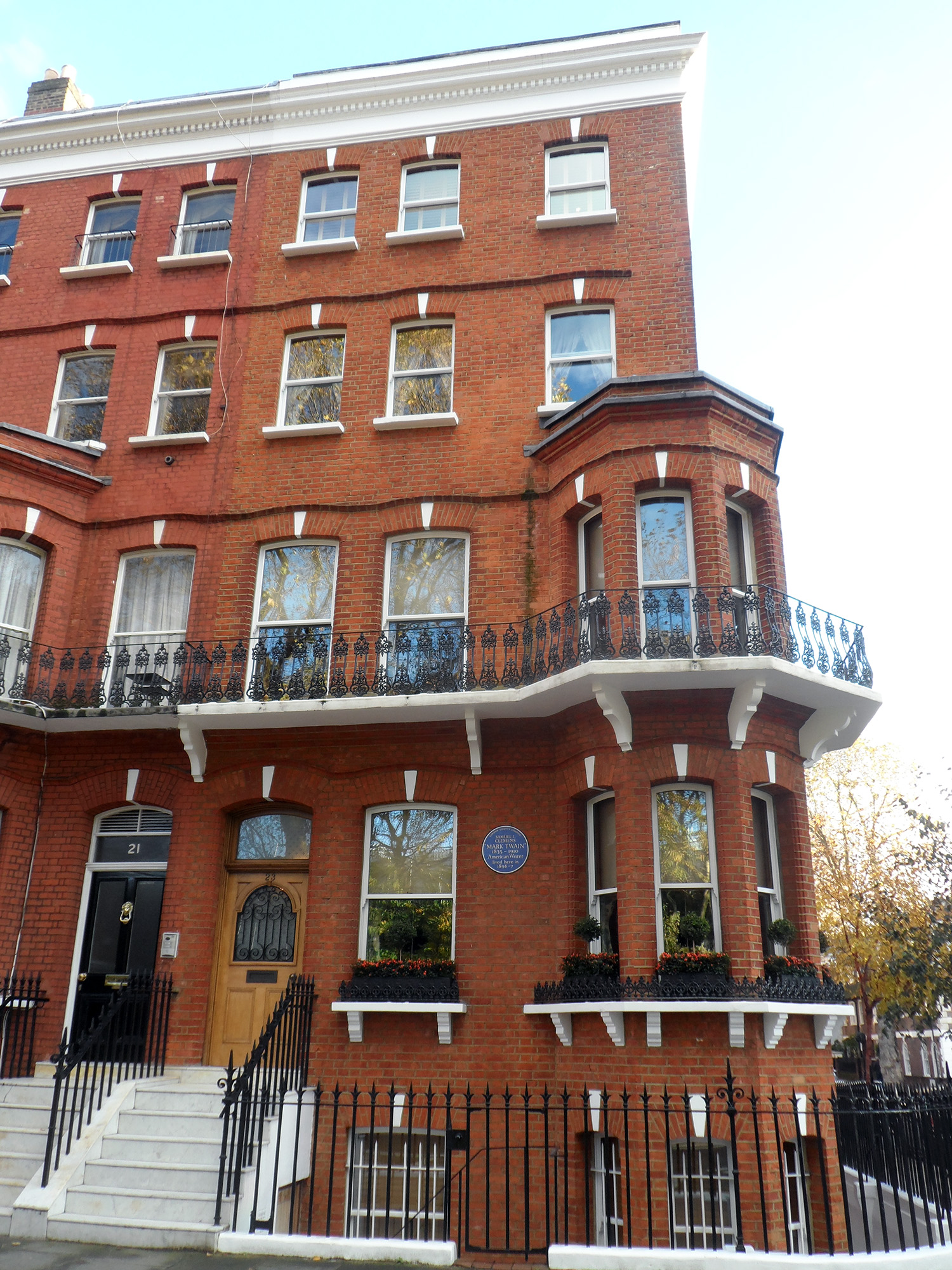
The home of Mark Twain in Tedworth Square in 2014.

Tedworth Square is a garden square in London's Chelsea district, SW3. The communal garden at the centre of the development is 0.1962 hectares (0.485 acres) in size.

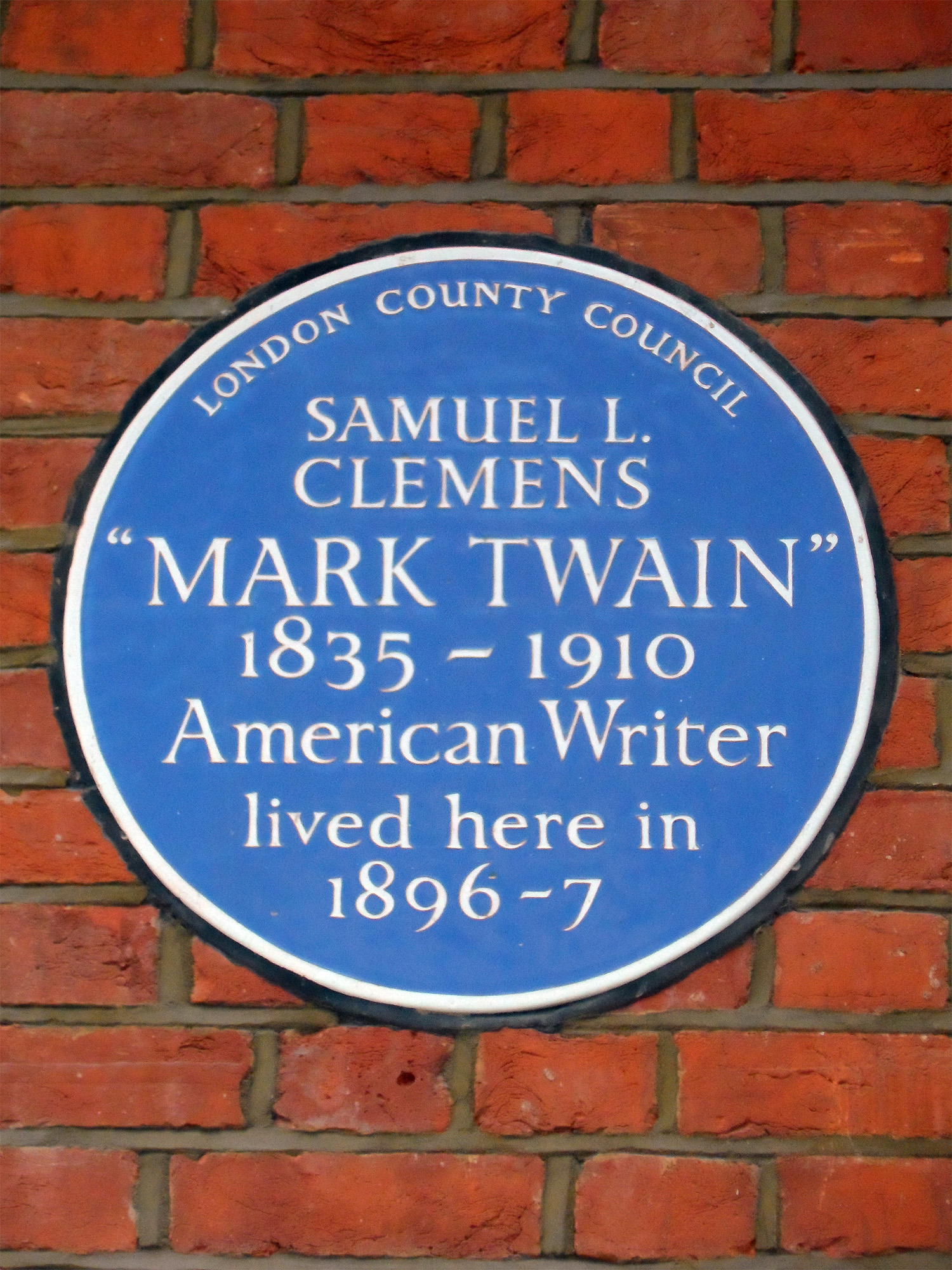
The English Heritage blue plaque commemorating Mark Twain at 23 Tedworth Square

The Cadogan family acquired the land in 1753 upon the death of Hans Sloane, and the subsequent division of his estate between his daughters, Mrs Stanley, and Elizabeth Lady Cadogan. The square was laid out on the market gardens of Durham House in 1871. The square is named for the Hampshire town of Tedworth, the home of the daughter-in-law of Revd. George Sloane-Stanley. Private property developers bought the north side of the square from the Cadogan Estate and demolished it in 1977, rebuilding it between 1978–81 to designs by Chapman Taylor Partners.

In 1928 the garden was described as being an 'almost square area surrounded by a thick privet hedge and attractively laid out with lawns, flower beds and trees'. A privet hedge surrounds the square behind modern railings. A lawn with flowerbeds and plane trees are features of the garden.

The average price of a property in Tedworth Square was £2.4 million in 2019.

== Notable residents ==
- No. 15 was the home of the actresses Lilly Langtry and later Mrs Patrick Campbell. The cricketer Pelham "Plum" Warner also resided here.
- No. 23 was the residence of the American writer Mark Twain from the autumn of 1896 until June 1897. Twain and his wife lived in seclusion following the death of their daughter in 1896 during Twain's lecture tour of Europe. His residence is marked by a London County Council blue plaque placed in 1960.
- No. 19 was the childhood residence of socialite Annabelle Neilson and her family during the 1970s and 1980s.
