= Downe House School =

Girls' school in Berkshire, England

Location
- Hermitage Road; Cold Ash, Berkshire, RG18 9JJ; England; 51.4373°N 1.2737°W

Information
- Type: Private day and boarding
- Religious affiliation: Church of England
- Established: 1907
- Department for Education URN: 110123 Tables
- Headmistress: Emma McKendrick
- Gender: Girls
- Age: 11 to 18
- Enrolment: 559
- Colour
- Publication: Cloisters
- Alumnae: Downe House Seniors
- Website: www.downehouse.net

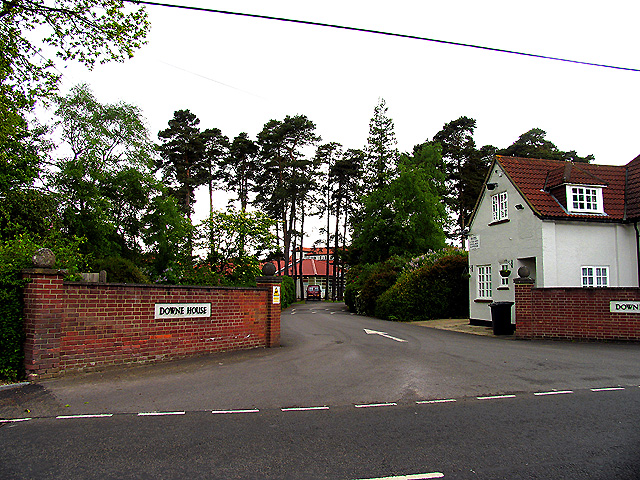
Main entrance

Downe House School is a private girls' boarding and day school in Cold Ash near Newbury, Berkshire, for girls aged 11–18. Entrance is selective, and the school has an enrollment of 559.

== History ==
Downe House was founded in 1907 by Olive Willis, its first headmistress, as an all-girls' boarding school. Its first home was Down House in the village of Downe, Kent (now part of the London Borough of Bromley), which had been the home of Charles Darwin.

By 1921 Down House was too small for the school, so Willis bought The Cloisters, Cold Ash, Berkshire, from the religious order known as the Order of Silence. The school moved to the Cloisters in 1922, where it has since remained. It now accepts day pupils but is still predominantly a boarding school.

Downe House won Tatler's "Best Public School" award in 2011, and again in 2026.

== Houses ==
As most girls at Downe House are boarders, the house system is incorporated with the boarding programme. Three boarding houses – Hill, Hermitage, and Darwin – home the youngest students (ages 11–13). They progress to a mixed-age house – either AGN (Ancren Gate North), AGS (Ancren Gate South), Aisholt, Holcombe, or Tedworth – until the sixth form, where they board in either Willis or York house.

Students in the Lower Fourth year spend a term boarding at Downe House's campus at Sauveterre near Toulouse, France.

== Admissions ==
Downe House educates girls between the ages of 11 and 18, taking them from the last years of junior school through to the sixth form. Girls can join the school at the ages of eleven, twelve, or thirteen, on leaving a primary or prep school, or at sixteen after completing GCSEs. The biggest intake of girls is at 11+.

Entry into Downe House is competitive, with entrants needing to pass the Common Entrance Examination.

== Curriculum ==
The core subjects at Downe House are English, mathematics and science as well as humanities, classics and social sciences subjects and there are options such as fine arts, foreign languages and business studies.

In 2010, the Cambridge Pre-U was introduced as an alternative to A Levels at Downe House.

== 2004 fees story ==
In 2004, as reported by The Times, Downe House was one of about sixty of the country's leading independent schools which were accused of running an unlawful price-fixing cartel, contrary to the Competition Act 1998, enabling them to drive up fees charged to thousands of parents. After an Inquiry later that year, in 2005 the school was ordered to pay a nominal penalty of £10,000, and with the other schools agreed to make ex-gratia payments totalling three million pounds into a trust to benefit pupils who attended the schools during the period in question. However, the Independent Schools Council said the investigation had been "a scandalous waste of public money". Jean Scott, its head, said that the schools had always been exempt from anti-cartel rules applied to business, were following a long-established procedure in sharing the information with each other, and had been unaware of a change to the law, on which they had not been consulted. She wrote to John Vickers, the Office of Fair Trading director-general, "They are not a group of businessmen meeting behind closed doors to fix the price of their products to the disadvantage of the consumer. They are schools that have quite openly continued to follow a long-established practice because they were unaware that the law had changed."

== Notable alumnae ==
- Margaret Aston (1932–2014), medieval historian
- Clare Balding (b. 1971), BBC sports presenter
- Elizabeth Bowen (1899–1973), novelist and short story writer
- Susan Chen, artist and painter
- Tessa Dahl (b. 1957), writer and actor
- Amaryllis Fleming (1925–1999), cellist
- Aileen Fox (1907–2005), archaeologist
- Miranda Hart (b. 1972), comedian and actress
- Marina Hyde (b. 1974), columnist for The Guardian
- Geraldine James (b. 1950), actress
- Catherine, Princess of Wales (b. 1982)
- Mary Midgley (1919–2018), philosopher
- Rosemary Murray (1913–2004), chemist, lecturer and the first woman to hold office as Vice-Chancellor of the University of Cambridge
- Countess Alexandra Tolstoy (b. 1973), writer and presenter
- Edith Holt Whetham (1911–2001), agricultural historian and economist
- Annette Worsley-Taylor (1944–2015), fashion entrepreneur and the founder of London Fashion Week.

== Bibliography ==
- Atkins, Hedley (1976). "Downe House School". Down: the Home of the Darwins: the story of a house and the people who lived there (2nd ed.). [Chichester]: Phillimore. pp. 106–110. ISBN 0-85033-231-1.
- Bowen, Elizabeth (1950). "The Mulberry Tree". Collected Impressions. London: Longmans Green and Co. pp. 185–194. (Describes life at Downe House during World War I)
- Horsler, Val; Kingsland, Jenny (2006). Downe House: a Mystery and a Miracle. London: Third Millennium Publishing. ISBN 978-1-903942-50-5.
- Ridler, Anne (1967). Olive Willis and Downe House: an adventure in education. London: John Murray. At openlibrary.org
