= Joscelyn Plunket Bushe-Fox =

British archaeologist (1880–1954)

- Born: 7 July 1880; Hampstead, Middlesex
- Died: 15 October 1954 (aged 74); Epson Surrey
- Awards: FSA
- Scientific career
- Fields: Archaeology
- Workplaces: The Office of Works

Joscelyn Plunket "J.P." Bushe-Fox CBE, FSA, MA (7 July 1880 – 15 October 1954), was a British archaeologist, civil servant, and an officer in the British Army.

== Early life ==
Joscelyn Plunket Bushe-Fox was born in Hampstead in Middlesex (now Greater London) on the 7th of July 1880. He was the youngest child of Luke Loftus Bushe Fox and Mary Ann Bushe Fox (nee Browne). His father was from Cordara, County Longford, Ireland who was a Major in The Prince of Wales’s Royal Regiment of Longford Rifles. Mary Ann Bushe Fox was born in Hampstead.

Luke Loftus Bushe Fox was baptised as Luke Loftus Bushe after the maiden name of his mother Kathleen Bushe, and in turn Luke Loftus Bushe Fox baptised his children with the name Bushe. By the time of Luke Bushe-Fox’s death in 1894 his surname was hyphenated as Bushe-Fox.

J P Bushe-Fox was educated at St Paul’s school London. He did not attend university and worked in a bank after leaving school.

== Archaeological career ==
In 1910, after contracting tuberculosis, he was sent to Egypt to recover. There he worked for the Egyptologist Flinders Petrie on his excavations.

Returning to Britain he worked on the excavations at the Roman site of Corstopitum, modern Corbridge, in Northumberland, that were directed by R H Forster and W H Knowles. He contributed to the report on the 1911 excavations.

J P Bushe-Fox then directed a series of excavations for the research committee of the Society of Antiquaries of London. The first site he dug for the committee was at Hengistbury Head (then in Hampshire, now in Dorset) from December 1911 to June 1912, which was published in 1915.

Bushe-Fox then directed three seasons of work at the Roman site of Wroxeter in Shropshire. The first season, July to November 1912, was published in 1913. The second season was from June 1913 until the beginning of December 1913. The report was published in 1914. The third and final season began in June 1914 and lasted until January 1915. This report was published in 1916.

== World War I ==
Despite being thirty-four years old when war broke out J P Bush-Fox joined the British army during the First World War. He was assigned to the General List and worked for the Directorate of Graves Registration and Enquiries, the predecessor to the Commonwealth War Graves Commission. He was promoted to acting captain in November 1917 and on his demobilisation in November 1920, he was granted the rank of Major.

== The Office of Works ==
After the war, he joined the Office of Works and was appointed as an Inspector of Ancient Monuments in 1920 and became Chief Inspector of Ancient Monuments in 1933 until his retirement in 1945.

While working as an inspector of Ancient Monuments he also continued to direct excavations for the Research Committee of the Society of Antiquaries. In 1921 he directed the excavation of the Iron Age cemetery site at Swarling near to Canterbury in Kent. The report was published in 1925.

In the summer of 1922, Bushe-Fox began excavating at the site of the Roman fort at Richborough in Kent. Excavations continued on and off until 1938. The results of the excavations were published in several volumes, volume 1 in 1926, volume 2 in 1928, and volume 3 in 1932. In 1931 J P Bushe-Fox suffered a serious accident when he was buried by a collapsing trench while inspecting an excavation in Colchester, which had a continuing effect on his health. This accident delayed the publication of volume 4 of the Richborough report until 1949. A fifth and final report on the Richborough excavations was edited by Barry Cunliffe and published in 1968.

Bushe-Fox served on the Council of the Society of Antiquaries in 1924-5, in 1930, and again in 1936-7 and was an active member of the Research Committee from 1912 until 1943.

== Honours and awards ==
- Elected FSA June 1915
- Honorary MA degree from Manchester 1928
- Awarded a CBE in January 1945

== Personal life ==
J P Bushe-Fox’s father died when he was fourteen. His older brother Luke Henry Kendal Bushe-Fox died in 1916, leaving J P Bushe-Fox as the main support for his mother and five older sisters. He married Cicely Catherine Agnes Pratt in 1939. He died at the Horton Hospital in Epsom, Surrey on the 15th of October 1954.

== Bibliography ==
- Bushe-Fox, J P; Collingwood, R G; Crawford, O G S; Gray, H St George; Humphreys, J; Clark-Maxwell, Preb W G (1928). Report of the Thirty-fifth Congress and of the Earthworks Committee for the year 1927. London: Congress of Archaeological Societies.
- Bushe-Foxe, Joscelyn Plunket (1915). Excavations at Hengistbury Head, Hampshire in 1911-12 (Reports of the Research Committee of the Society of Antiquaries of London). London: Society of Antiquaries.
- Bushe-Fox, Joscelyn (1925). Excavation of the Late-Celtic urn-field at Swarling, Kent. Society of Antiquaries of London. doi:10.26530/OAPEN_1001761. hdl:20.500.12657/28232.
- Bushe-Fox, Joscelyn (1913). Excavations on the site of the Roman town at Wroxeter, Shropshire, in 1912. Society of Antiquaries of London. doi:10.26530/OAPEN_1001757. hdl:20.500.12657/28236.
- Bushe-Fox, Joscelyn Plunket (1914). Second report on the excavations on the site of the Roman town at Wroxeter, Shropshire, 1913. Society of Antiquaries of London. doi:10.26530/OAPEN_1001758. hdl:20.500.12657/28235.
- Bushe-Fox, Joscelyn Plunket (1916). Third report on the excavations on the site of the Roman town at Wroxeter, Shropshire, 1914. Society of Antiquaries of London. doi:10.26530/OAPEN_1001760. hdl:20.500.12657/28233.
- Bushe-Fox, Joscelyn Plunket (1915). Excavations at Hengistbury Head, Hampshire, in 1911–12. Society of Antiquaries of London. doi:10.26530/OAPEN_1001759. hdl:20.500.12657/28234.
- Bushe-Fox, J.P. (1926). First Report on the Excavations of the Roman Fort at Richborough, Kent. Society of Antiquaries of London. doi:10.26530/OAPEN_1005545. hdl:20.500.12657/24565.
- Bushe-Fox, J. P. (1928). Second Report on the Excavations of the Roman Fort at Richborough, Kent. Society of Antiquaries of London. doi:10.26530/OAPEN_1005546. hdl:20.500.12657/24564.
- Bushe-Fox, J. P. (1930). Third Report on the Excavations of the Roman Fort at Richborough, Kent. Society of Antiquaries of London. doi:10.26530/OAPEN_1005547. hdl:20.500.12657/24563.
- Bushe-Fox, J.P. (1949). Fourth report on the excavations of the Roman fort at Richborough, Kent. Society of Antiquaries of London. doi:10.26530/OAPEN_1004998. hdl:20.500.12657/25096.
- Bushe-Fox, J. P. (1913). "The Use of Samian Pottery in dating the early Roman occupation of the north of Britain". Archaeologia. 64: 295–314. doi:10.1017/S0261340900010742. eISSN 2051-3186. ISSN 0261-3409.
- Bushe-Fox, J P; Atkinson, D (1912). "Excavations at Uriconium (Wroxeter)". Transactions of the Shropshire Archaeological and Natural History Society. 4th. 2 (2).
- Bushe-Fox, J P (1921). "Review - An Introduction to the Study of Terra Sigillata, treated from a chronological standpoin". The Antiquaries Journal: 150–151. doi:10.1017/S0003581500002146.
- Forster, R H; Knowles, W H; Haverfield, F J; Craster, H H E; Bushe-Fox, J P (1912). "Corstopitum: report of the excavations of 1911". Archaeologia Aeliana. 3. 8: 137–263.
