= Aerial advertising =

Type of advertisement

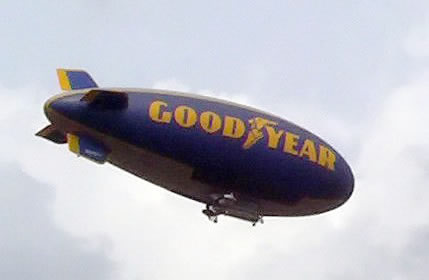
The Goodyear Blimp uses branding and animated lighting displays.

Aerial advertising is a form of advertising that incorporates the use of flogos, manned aircraft, or drones to create, transport, or display, advertising media. The media can be static, such as a banner, logo, lighted sign or sponsorship branding. It can also be dynamic, such as animated lighted signage, skywriting, or audio.

Prior to World War II, aviation pioneer Arnold Sidney Butler, the owner and operator of Daniel Webster Airport (New Hampshire) utilizing his fleet of J3 Cubs, created banner towing and was credited with a number of inventions and aircraft modifications used to pick up and release banners. At the start of World War II, the government took over the airstrip for military training. Afterward, Butler moved his aircraft to Florida and formed Circle-A Aviation where he continued his banner towing business. Still today, many of his aircraft remain in service and can be seen in the skies over Miami and Hollywood, Florida.

Aerial advertising is perceived by marketing strategists as effective if a large target audience is gathered near the source of advertising, although media studies scholars tend to nuance those claims.

Balloons, skywriting, and banner towing are usually strategically located. Long-range vehicles such as blimps and flogos can reach a broader audience along their flight route. Secondary distribution such as news media coverage, word of mouth and photos of aerial advertising can reach an extended audience. Due to safety, privacy, and aesthetic reasons, the ability to perform aerial advertising is regulated by local and federal entities throughout the world.

== Employment methods ==
=== Mobile billboard ===
Advertising can be carried on the envelope or livery of the aircraft, or in the case of balloons, the envelope can be constructed into a specific shape to advertise a product.

Sky Sign Inc. created, patented and holds various STC's for their aerial LED-based signs. These signs attach to rotorcraft and fixed wing aircraft.

=== Banner towing ===
Banner towing is a form of skywriting where a banner is towed or dragged behind an aircraft. Since a banner produces a large amount of aerodynamic drag, the airspeed of the towing aircraft is kept low in order to minimize the amount of power required.

The banner itself can be of three types:

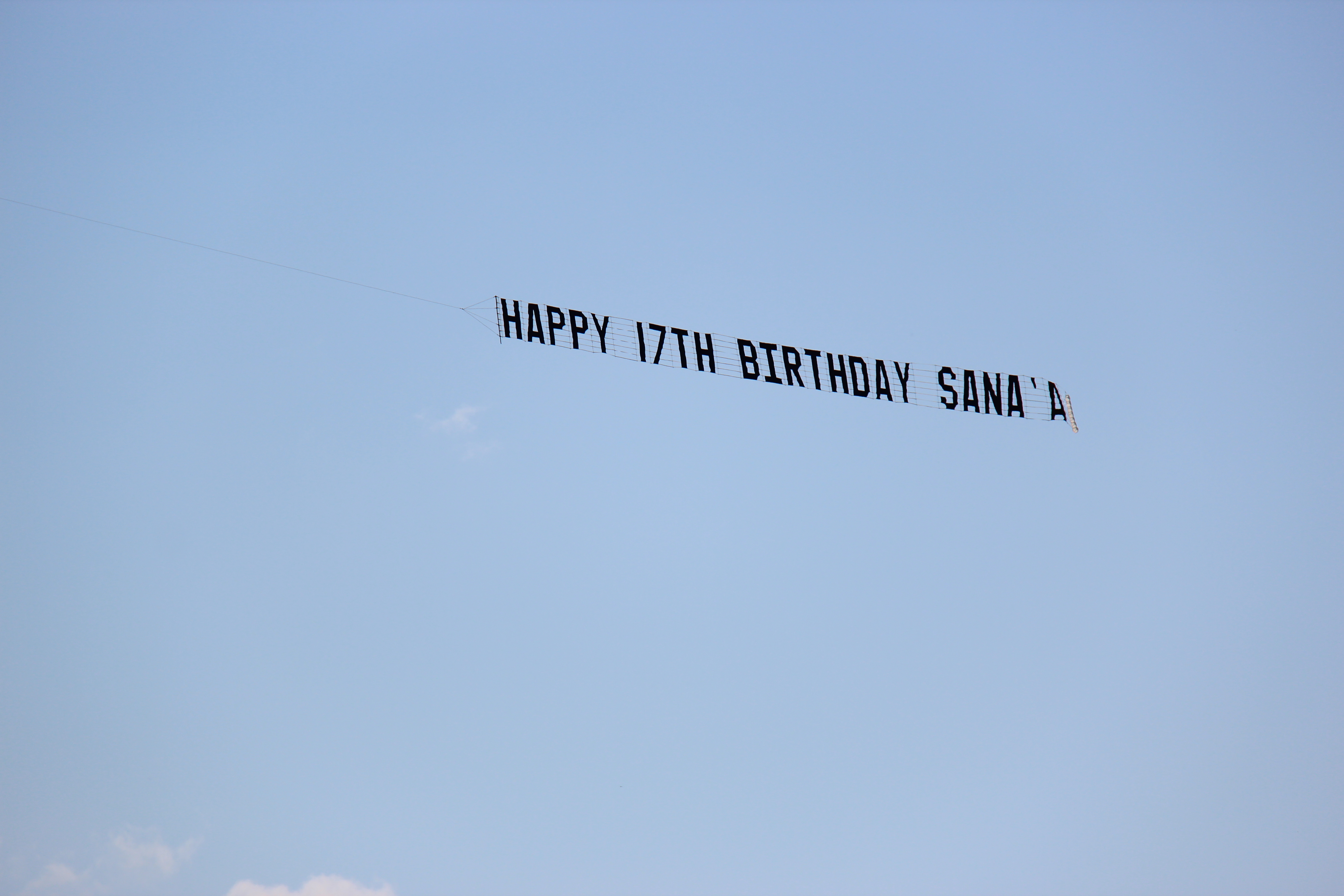
An example of an aircraft-towed banner using standard letters

==== Standard letters ====
Banners using standard letters consist of a series of either 5-foot-high or 7-foot-high letters connected together by joints designed for interchangeability. Standard letters have been the predominant form of banner towing for the past decades.

7-foot letters have the advantage of greater readability over a long distance, but incur a large drag penalty on the towing aircraft. 5-foot letters, on the other hand, trade off some readability for the ability of the towing aircraft to tow longer messages.

A typical light aircraft is able to tow 25 7-foot letters or 35 5-foot letters.

Advantages of standard letters are readability over a large distance and flexibility. The letters being prefabricated means they can be made into messages with very short notice and can be changed easily after each flight.

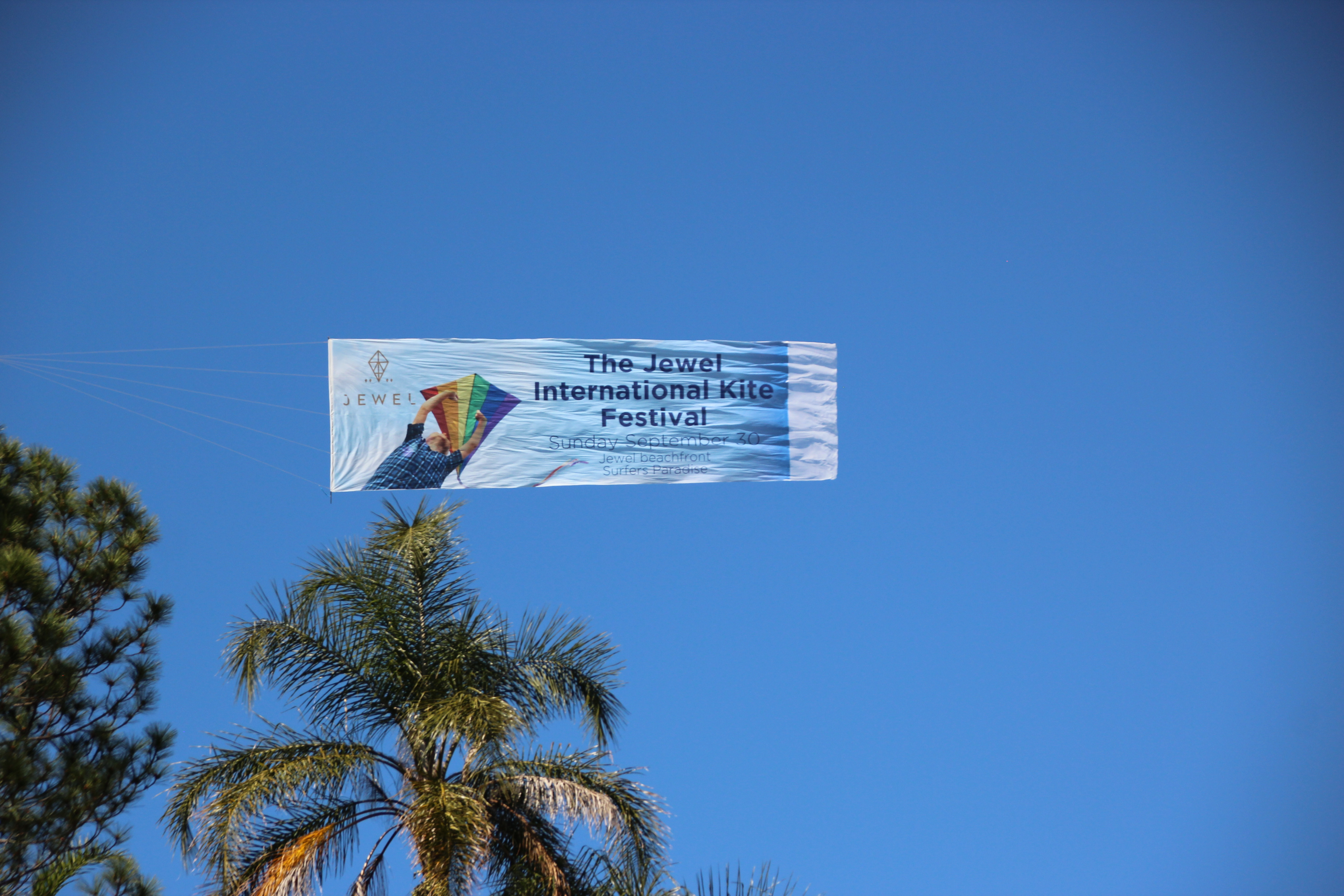
An aircraft-towed aerial billboard

==== Aerial billboards ====
Aerial billboards are a relatively new form of banner towing. They usually consist of a large area of nylon cloth and are similar in weight to a spinnaker on a sailing boat. This blank canvas allows vivid pictures to be digitally printed and towed either behind an aircraft or below a helicopter.

Helicopter billboards tend to be square in shape to prevent the top corner sagging and becoming unreadable.

Aircraft-towed billboards tend to be rectangular; usually 1 high to 3 long but sizes of 1 high to 4 long are becoming the norm.

The main advantage of aerial billboards is their visual impact. When banner towing using helicopters, they are much better suited for that use than standard letters are. The disadvantages of aerial billboards are that once painted or printed they cannot be changed as quickly or easily as standard letters. Additionally, they take considerably longer to produce than standard letters.

==== Logo banners ====
This form of banner-towing combines aerial billboards with standard letters to produce a banner that incorporates both types, bringing the "blank canvas" of aerial billboards together with the flexibility of standard letters. Commonly, an intermediate-sized area of nylon cloth is placed at the front of a banner which is then followed by standard letters.

This technique is most often used to advertise a brand, but can also be used as a marriage proposal or party invitation.

=== Flogos ===
Flogos (portmanteau of "floating“ and "logos“) are customizable motifs made out of a stable mass of lighter-than-air soap-based bubbles formed into a specific shape. They are a type of "foam balloon" suitable for both outdoor and indoor use, and float in the air once released. They are produced by specialized mobile machines which first combine a patented foam fluid with water and helium to make the foam. The generated foam then gets pressed through a stencil which will determine its individual shape. The machines which produce Flogos are produced and sold by Global Special Effects, who also own the Flogos name and specific concept. Flogos are often customized to suit needs and can be any number of shapes, logos, symbols, letters, and words, which is the reason why they are often linked to aerial advertising, or "Skyvertising".

=== Sky-writing ===
Sky-writing by fixed-wing aircraft, combined with the use of a vapor projector, remains popular with major advertisers. It is most effective in brand awareness with short, dramatic messages and occasionally for "spectaculars" such as marriage proposals. The practice of sky-writing is known to be one of the safest forms of flying, as it is only done in clear skies with smooth air (winds can be strong but smooth) and usually in controlled airspace, where radar separation is provided between planes.

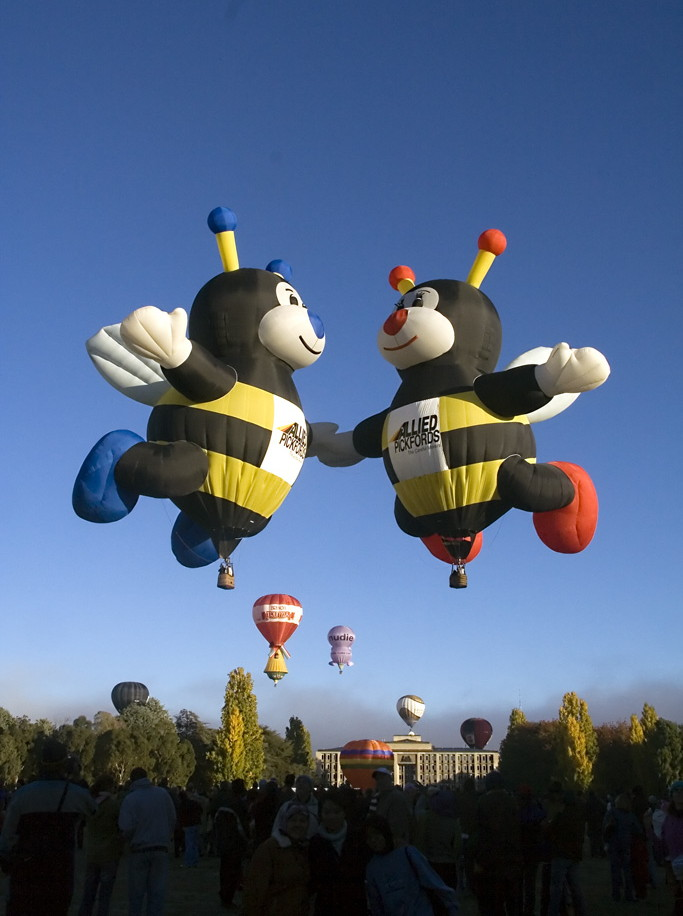
Hot air balloons advertising a furniture removals company in Canberra, 2006.

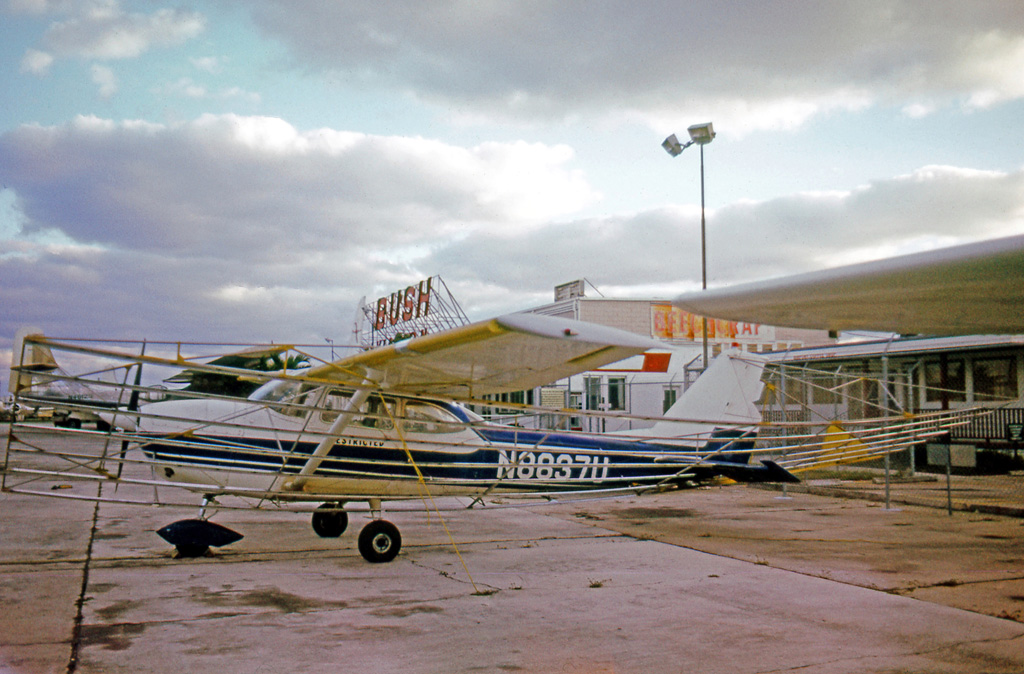
Large aerial advertising array fixed to a Cessna 172 at Fort Lauderdale in 1973. This supported illuminated messages.

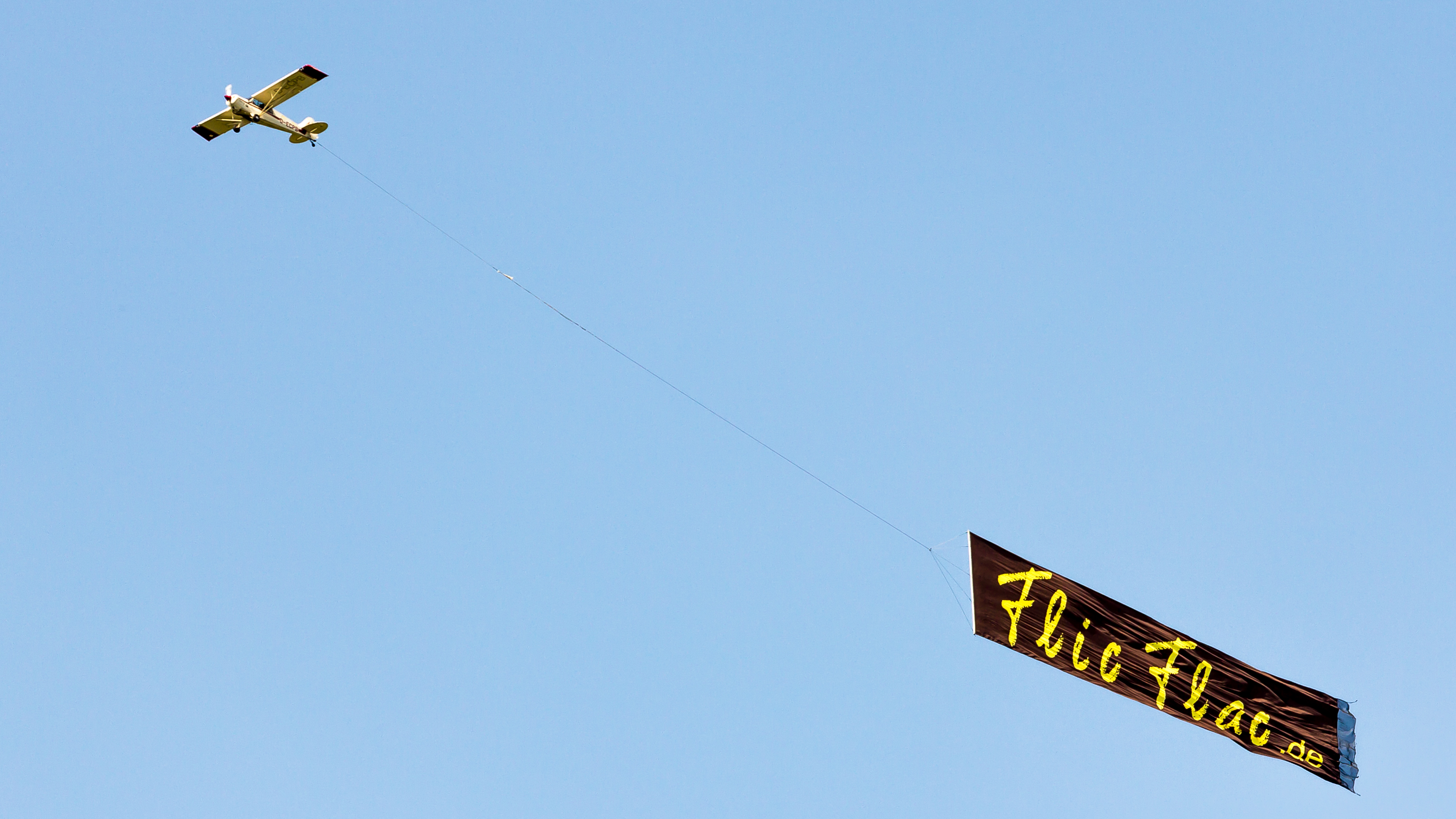
Banner towing

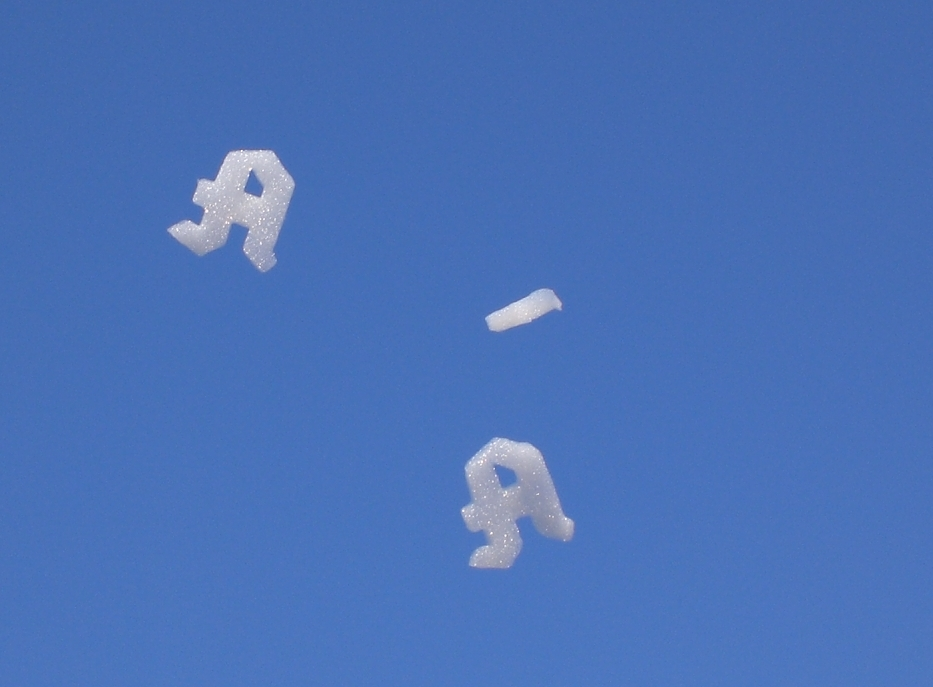
Skyvertising with Flogos, flying foam shapes

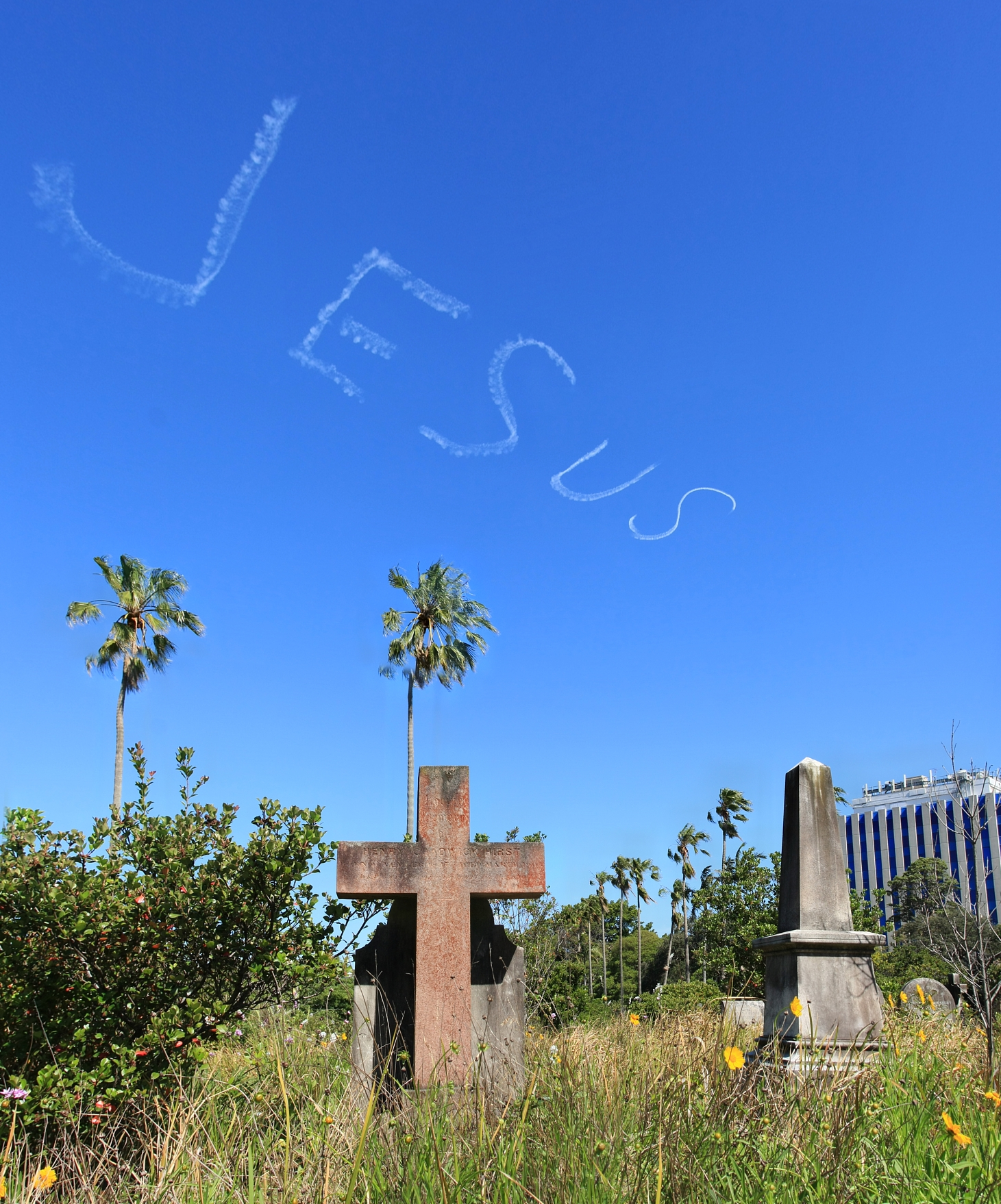
Skywriting over a cemetery in New South Wales in 2009.

== Type of aircraft used ==
=== Aerostats ===
Aerostats are effective carriers of mobile billboards due to their slow speed, long loiter time and inexpensive fuel costs. The first British airship, built by Stanley Spencer in 1902, was funded by an advertisement for baby food carried on its envelope.

Research from the United States suggests that the direct cost of balloon advertising "per thousand opportunities to see" is lower than for newspapers, posters, radio or television.

=== Fixed-wing aircraft ===
The most common type of fixed-wing aircraft used for mobile billboards and aerial advertising are single reciprocating engine aircraft, such as converted crop dusters. While on the ground, operators attach a grapple hook and a towline to the rear of the aircraft. Once in flight, the operator comes back and links the grapple hook to the banner, billboard, or streamer while in flight. The wind resistance created during the natural course of flight causes the banner to stream out behind the aircraft, allowing it to be easily seen by those nearby.

Because of the relatively low speed and altitude ceiling of propeller aircraft, this type is generally favored for the deployment of mobile billboards when fixed-wing aircraft are used. All metropolitan areas in the U.S. can be serviced except New York City and Washington, D.C. which have restricted airspace.

In the 1950s banner-towing started to become widely used as a cost-effective way of bringing a message to the attention of targeted groups of people. There were very few restrictions, the airspace was not nearly as tightly regulated as today. VFR traffic, meaning aircraft navigating solely by visual reference, could even fly into some major airports without using two-way radio, using special air corridors and getting landing, take-off, and taxi instructions by coloured light signals using an "Aldis" lamp from the control tower.

The Dutch charter airline Martinair, now part of the air-cargo arm of KLM Royal Dutch Airlines, was founded in the 1950s by Martin Schroeder, a former Dutch Air force pilot, as a company using tethered balloons and banners. The towing aircraft used were DH 82a Tiger Moth, written off as primary trainers, and the occasional Auster. The company later set up an air charter operation at Amsterdam-Schiphol Airport. The first aircraft were a Cessna 172 (PH-MAF) and a De Havilland Dove. Later expansion followed and the company split into the charter company, called "Martin's Air Charter", later Martinair and the light aircraft division, called "Luchtreclame Nederland" based at Hilversum Aerodrome. It was later renamed "Reclamair", moved to Lelystad in the 1970s and expanded into a flying school and restaurant.

The previous is to illustrate that aerial advertising was big business then, and could grow into a much bigger operation. A parallel can be found in Germany, where a banner-towing company grew into a much larger operation. At Essen-Muelheim a company called "Westdeutsche Luftwerbung Theodor Wuellenkemper KG" became "WDL Flugdienst" with main operations based at Cologne-Bonn.

The aircraft: Although there are various types of aircraft suitable for banner-towing they have to have stable flying characteristics, sufficient power to overcome the substantial drag created by a banner streaming behind the aircraft and they must be equipped with a quick-release hook at the tail. Needless to say, they must be approved for towing operations by the civil aviation authorities. In the 1950s Tiger Moths were cheap and dominated the scene in the Netherlands, but the occasional surviving Fieseler Storch was also very suitable. These aircraft now are priceless classics. Current types are Piper PA18 Super Cub, Vilga, Cessna 172 and others like Morane-Saulnier Rallye, Aeronca Champion, etc. Often these aircraft, when not in use for banner-towing, are used for towing gliders. Some crop dusters are equipped with a hook for towing operations. Nowadays we find that many are turboprop, or diesel powered. Even a twin-engine Dornier D28 has been seen towing a banner. For towing, a grapple hook is attached. Mostly it is in the pilot's lap for take-off. It will be thrown out and door or canopy closed. The Super Cub door has a top and bottom half and the pilot could close it after take-off. The C172 door hinges forward. The pilot has to throw the grapnel out of the window, but the 172 often has a second quick-release under the belly. The hook is attached and released after getting airborne. If the pilot makes a mistake, (s)he will only have a line trailing from the aircraft with the grapple hanging under the belly. The only solution is to land, rectify it and take off again, hoping not too many spectators will have noticed.

The grapple (or grapnel) resembles a three-pronged anchor. But the prongs are rounded and bent back towards the stock. This design prevents the grapple digging into the ground in the event that the aircraft makes its run-in a bit low. And it will also reduce the risk of the loop, about which later, slipping off.

For the pick-up, the banner will be spread on the ground. There are two main types: One, a large poster. Not seldom 3 or 4 metres square. Often sewn by professional sail makers using pieces of parachute- or spinnaker nylon in different colours. They may represent a tube of toothpaste, a bottle, a company logo. Expensive to manufacture, they are mainly used for long-term contracts. The other type, more often used, is a text, a streamer as a rule made up of interchangeable letters, mainly black and sometimes red if emphasis is required.

The various components are: a line with grapple hook as mentioned, a loop attached to a long line, a parachute, a front boom, the actual streamer with the text or visual message and a stabilizing piece of webbing at the end. The stabilizer is necessary for two reasons: the end of the banner tends to flap or wave, making the last bit of the message difficult to read. It also wears more quickly so that the stabilizer also has a sacrificial function, as a piece of webbing is cheaper to replace.

The standard text consists of individual, detachable letters. A ground crew will assemble it beforehand. The standard height usually is in the order of 5 feet. This is a compromise because too large means a smaller text – limited by the aircraft manufacturers and copper-fasted by the CAA – and too small means that it will become difficult to read from the ground. Since they are used and re-used they normally are open-type making them stand out against the sky. A white background can get dirty over time. The letters are sown on parallel lines of thin, strong nylon rope. At the front of each letter is a rod of thin, strong and supple steel. The nylon lines at the front are fitted with wooden pegs, at the end the open lines have loops. When assembling a text, the letters are checked for integrity as they come out of storage and laid out on the ground to form the message. When everything is found to be in order, no pegs missing, no wires broken, no tears and the actual text correct without spelling mistakes the letters will be assembled and the webbing at the end attached, as well as a front boom. This is a strong metal rod with loops at the end. There usually are three lines to the actual towing line. The top one is shortest so that the center of gravity will be below the center of the boom. This to ensure that the message will hang vertical. In addition, often the bottom will be fitted with a weight.

If, for whatever reason, the aircraft loses the banner or has to jettison it in an emergency, the front boom will tend to fall straight down. For this reason, a parachute is added. Care must be taken of course that it will stream closed in normal flight; if attached the wrong way around it will cause a very high drag.

The banner will now be rolled up, brought to the pick-up point, usually in the grass along the runway and unrolled. Again, it will have to be checked. If one of the lines catches and loops itself around one of the rods, the tension not only may result in damage, but also will cause the banner not to hang straight, even twist and roll in the airstream during flight and the message will be unreadable.

To the parachute will be attached a tow line and a loop. This loop is draped over two poles, upright in the ground, Sometimes over forks at the top, other operators use a bit of tubing, split to hold the loop just enough so that it will stay up without slipping off at the critical moment. The lines, typically, are in the order of 30–50 feet in length. If there are two aircraft flying in formation, the second one will be fitted with two lines. The second banner will trail further behind the towing aircraft and the texts will not overlap.

The position of the poles at the pick-up point can be marked to make them as visible as possible to the pilot. Traffic cones or other markers like a brightly colored cloth held down with a few stones, or pegs, can be useful. An operator will be positioned who can view the approaching aircraft and give instructions, either using bats or via a portable VHF radio. The banner will be laid out away from the poles against the wind direction. Seen from the cockpit, the pilot will see the banner lying behind the poles; having said that, the large square posters are often laid beside the poles. Their construction will cause less risk of friction over the surface than the open and much longer standard banner.

The pilot, having released the grapple, approaches the pick-up point parallel to the runway in a long, very shallow descent. The speed will differ according to the type of aircraft. For the Super Cub, it will typically be 60 mph with one notch of flap extended. In a strong wind, the speed can be 10 mph higher. Over the poles, at a signal from the batsman, (s)he will initiate a steep climb, full power, until a jolt confirms that the grapnel has engaged and the banner is lifted off the ground. At this point, the banner will quite literally "peel" off the surface without dragging. The sudden increase in drag will cause the aircraft to decelerate to below stall speed. The curved flight path will allow this to happen. The pilot will slam the controls forward. Once the banner has lifted off, the aircraft will regain flying speed instantly. It will not be more than about 200 feet off the ground at this time.

Cruising speed with a banner usually is at 45–50 mph. The banner will stabilize the aircraft. In flight, the PA18 will need about 2000–2100 rpm. More power will cause a very high increase in drag (for you, pilots: remember 1/2 rho vee square?), a corresponding increase in fuel burn and a gain of perhaps no more than 1 or two mph extra airspeed.

The aircraft will cruise, maintaining the flap setting. Again: two reasons. It reduces the stall speed, but it also allows a slightly less nose-up attitude. Meaning: a cooler engine.

When the mission is completed, the pilot will return to drop the banner before landing. The drop will be more accurate at as low an altitude as possible. If there is little or no wind, the pilot will fly over the drop-off position – usually the area where the pick-up took place – and pull the release. The banner will fall to the ground, the parachute will open to control the fall of the pole and the aircraft will join the traffic pattern for landing.

If there is a strong wind, the pilot may decide to drop at low altitude from a shallow dive. The dive will ensure that the banner, in cruise a few feet lower than the aircraft, will not prematurely touch down. If that happens, a weak link should disconnect the banner from the towing line. If that fails: the Super Cub may end up with the wheels touching the wings as the result of a (very) hard landing.

Banner towing has the reputation of being dangerous. In fact, if the pilot takes precautions it is not. The most important precaution is never, ever, to assume that the banner has failed to engage and start a turn to come back for another run – at very low level – too early. With the airspeed suddenly dropping off the clock in a (tight) turn, the banner will not stabilize it and the aircraft will enter a spin from which recovery is not possible. This is the phase of flight that has led to some banner towing pilots losing their lives.

On 6 May 2010 British politician Nigel Farage was a passenger in a single-engine light aircraft that crashed whilst towing an election banner. The pilot of the aircraft, a PZL-104 Wilga 35A, had made several attempts to hook the banner from the ground poles and when he finally did there was evidence that the banner towline had wrapped itself around the tailplane elevator. The towline wrap caused the pilot to be unable to control the aircraft and when he attempted to execute an emergency landing the plane, still towing the banner, it crashed landed, the engine broke away and the nose dug in causing the plane to flip over. Both pilot and Farage were seriously injured but recovered in hospital.

When coming in too low for the pick-up run, there is a risk that the banner is picked up with the wheels. Especially a tail dragger can be pulled upside-down when landing with the banner. One German operator carried a knife with an extra long handle in every Super Cub, so that the pilot could cut it loose. If not, the best technique is to come in to land approaching slightly high, making certain that the aircraft, at the lowest possible speed, will touch before the banner.

With experience, many pilots found that the best way to pick up is not to make the run-in at the height where the ground crew would see the grapple just above the ground.

Any turbulence would cause a swing and also could cause the hook to touch the ground. If that happened just before the poles, the grapple would bounce off and over the loop. The best way was to make the approach in a steady, very gentle dive. The pull-up could be initiated about 30 yards or so before the poles. Even if the grapple would be above the actual loop, the pull-up still would result in a decrease in airspeed which, in turn, would allow the momentum of the grapnel to swing a bit lower and engage. By that time, the aircraft would be in a much more gentle climb, already well above the poles and the stall at the top would also be much more under control.

Banner towing is no longer practiced as intensively as in the seventies, probably its European heyday. Stricter rules and regulations, especially when flying over urban centers and large assemblies, higher minimum altitudes, in some areas raised from 1000 feet to 2000, which reduces the legibility and impact. Low-flying aircraft are also perceived as a nuisance factor, perceived or real, but all have led to a decline in banner towing activities. In some countries, of course, the climate is not always reliable and the factual occurrence of banner-towing aircraft being caught out in IMC (weather conditions that make flight on instruments necessary if not outright mandatory), all have resulted in banner-towing becoming, if not a thing of the past, certainly becoming a much rarer form of advertising.

=== Drones ===
The growing popularity of consumer-grade and industry-grade unmanned aerial vehicles (particularly, quadcopter drones) led several companies to consider the opportunities of commercial application of such devices. For instance, Google and Amazon have plans of using drones as means of delivery, while the Coca-Cola Company, Lakemaid Beer, Paramount Pictures, and Wokker have already used them in a number of advertising campaigns. The cases of advertising-related application include the distribution of branded products, as well as drones carrying banners.

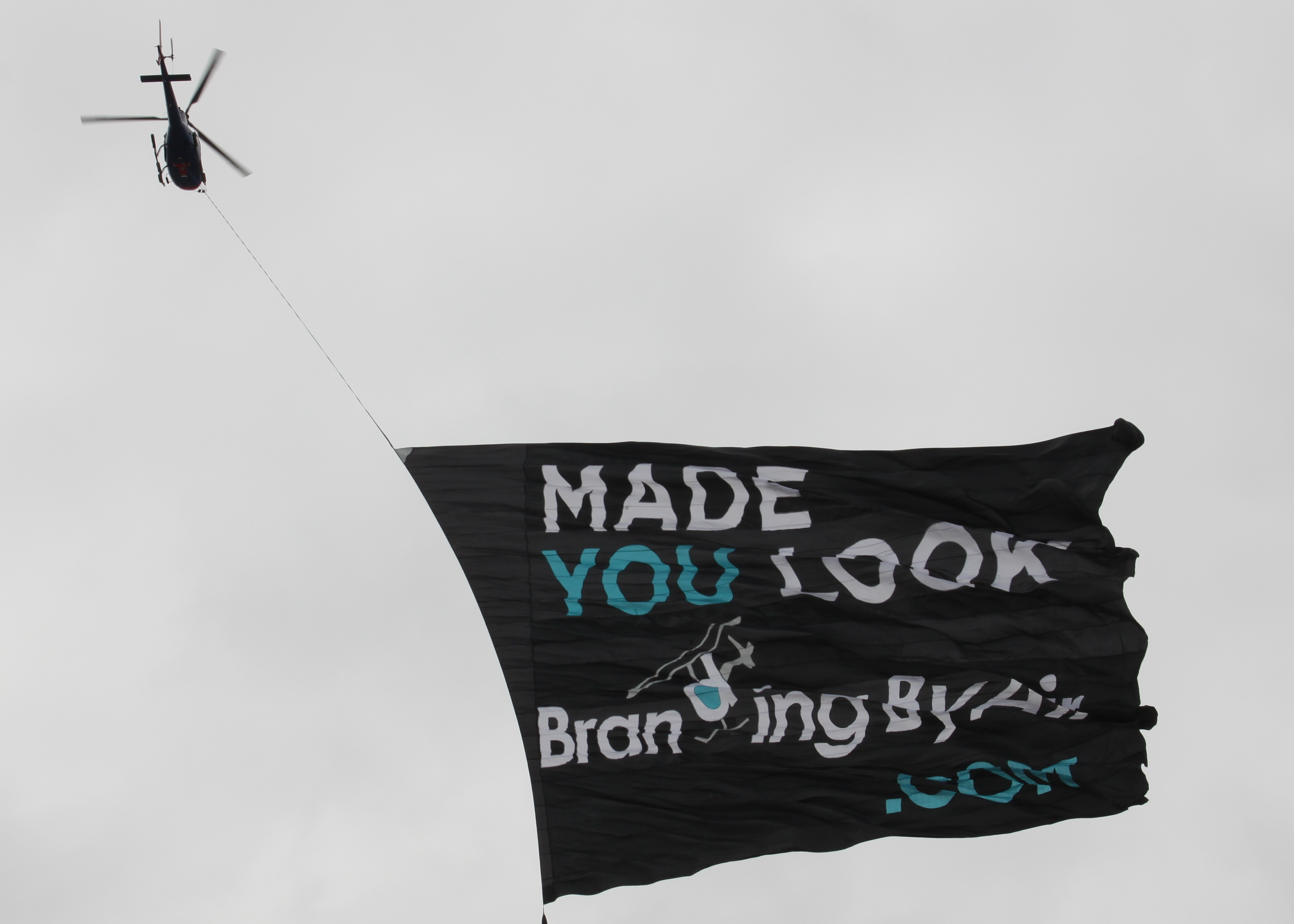
Large Format Printed Aerial Advertising Banner

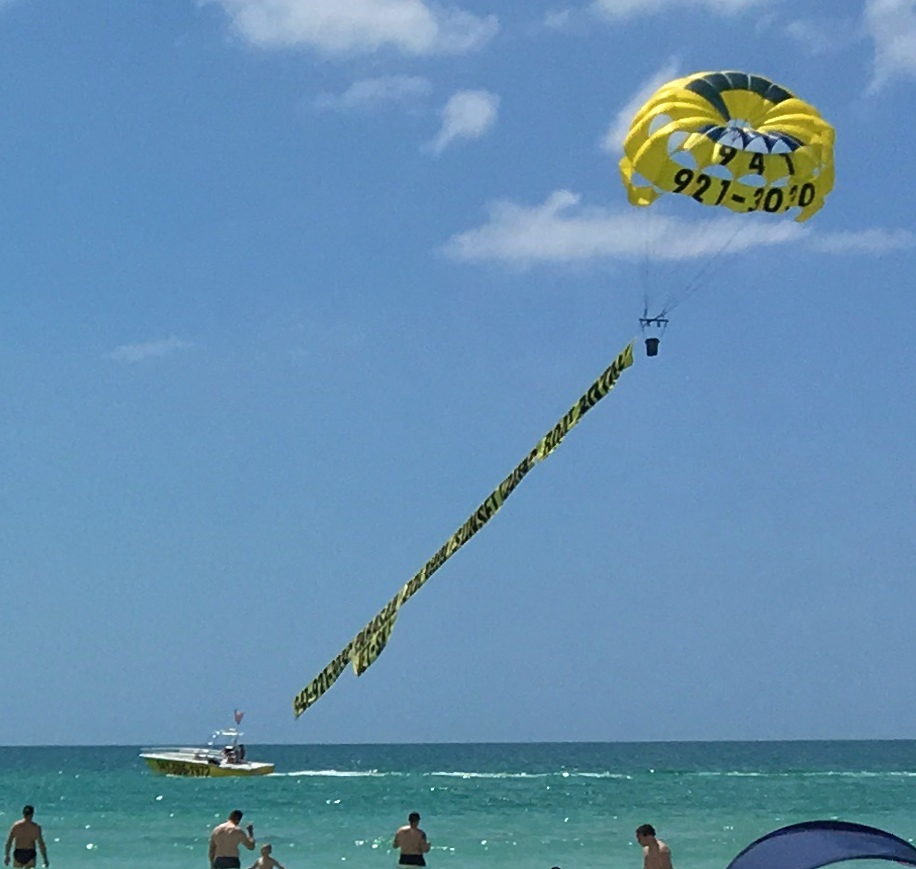
Banner towing by parasailing at Crescent Beach

=== Rotorcraft aircraft ===
Helicopters are capable of towing very large flags, typically made by joining many rows of printed fabric to create one image. Typical sizes of these banners are 20,000 sq ft, making them visible for greater distances due to their scale compared to plane banners.

Sean Herbert from Australia invented the helicopter banner system in 1993 and got it approved in 1999. It incorporated a weight bag release system that is sewn into the leading edge of the banner, allowing them to fly over populated areas. The system was later improved by Ryan Osbourne (also of Australia) and incorporated video projection technology to display video upon the banners. notably achieving a world record for MTV over the skies of New York.

=== Kite systems ===
For centuries kite systems have been employed to fly advertisements. Messages have been on wing covers as well as hung on the tether set of the kite systems. Logos, greetings, purchased advertising messages, political messages, religions celebration symbols, event-marking art, promotional phrases, and flags are frequently flown by kites. Advertising by kites is one of the many kite applications. William A. Eddy was an early pioneer in using kites for advertising.

=== Parasailing ===
Parasailing companies make custom banners suitable for towing by the same parachute that would otherwise tow a person. This form of aerial advertising is effective along beaches.

== Effectiveness ==
Modern proponents of aerial advertising hold the position that it is a cost-effective method to reach otherwise isolated pockets of consumers (such as people stuck in rush-hour traffic, or at the beach, where advertising tends to be limited). Aerial advertisements, according to the service providers, give a company the opportunity to target specific customers based on their geographical location and related demographics. The benefits of aerial advertising, banner towing in particular, include a high recall rate and increased engagement with a brand through social media.

Detractors of aerial advertising maintain it has a highly limited and ineffective scope in the age of the Internet. In particular, they state that the use of aircraft near two major metropolitan regions (NYC and D.C.) tends to be tightly regulated and restricted, and that, at least in the U.S., the use of aerial advertisement over sporting events with 30,000 or more in attendance is prohibited. Aerial advertising planes do fly before the events over the masses of tailgaters. A 2003 article by the Associated Press reports that aerial advertisement companies had lost a preliminary injunction against new federal security regulations, and all data indicate that the use of civilian fixed-wing aircraft over sporting events in the U.S. is forbidden.

Studies by advertisers have shown that mobile billboards carried by aircraft have a limited local exposure but a high consumer recall and retention rate – in other words, customers who see the ad tend to recall the message or product being displayed at a higher rate than with most other forms of advertising, but the region where the advertisement is displayed is limited to the flight path of the aircraft. The reason for this higher retention rate is unclear, but it can be postulated that it is due to the relatively unusual method in which the advertisement is displayed; the novelty of seeing a message in an unfamiliar way helps consumers to remember the message. Viral marketing and stealth marketing are excellent examples of this idea put to work in the modern day.

== Examples of use ==
Spencer's 1902 airship in flight, showing the advertising for Mellin's Food

- Pioneer balloonist and parachutist Stanley Spencer built the first British airship in 1902 with funds from Mellin and Company, the manufacturer of a leading brand of infant formula "for babies and invalids". The sum of £1,500 was payable in return for twenty five return flights carrying an advertisement for "Mellin's Food".
- The first use of skywriting for advertising was on 30 May 1922, when Cyril Turner, a former Royal Air Force officer, spelt out "London Daily Mail" in black smoke from an S.E.5a biplane at The Derby.
- During the 1994 Pennsylvania gubernatorial election, Tom Ridge used aerial advertising along the Jersey Shore, a vacation spot popular with Pennsylvanians.

== Risks ==
There are some inherent dangers involved in the operation of low-altitude manned aircraft. Most of the fixed-wing aerial advertisement accidents that have occurred in the U.S. have been determined by the United States Federal Aviation Administration to be the result of just a few basic causes:

- Problems during the pickup/deployment of the banner
- Banner tow lines that become tangled or snarled

Some of the specific areas of danger include grapple hook deployment errors, and banner pickup errors. If the grapple hook is not released in a satisfactory manner, it can snarl on the tailwheel or in the landing gear itself, fouling the landing and causing an improper landing or a crash event. Once the grapple hook is deployed, the aircraft must approach the banner pickup in a descent using the energy of the shallow dive, and then rotate with application of full power to pick up the banner. However, safety reasons may lead local authorities to consider banning some forms of aerial advertising in populated areas.

=== Risk mitigation ===
Modern companies have employed a new, patented, methodology of banner towing that greatly reduces the risks associated with the older, grappling hook method. With the new take-off technique, the pilot no longer has to pick up the banner in the tow hook - a time-consuming and technically demanding manoeuvre. Instead, the pilot can take the banner, already set up for towing, directly from the hangar across the taxiway to the airstrip, and then carry out a normal take-off.

A technical innovation makes the ground start possible. Wheels are mounted on both sides of the banner tube system, so the front part of the banner runs on rollers. This counteracts the effect which would otherwise be created between the banner and the ground over which it is towed, sucking the banner downwards.

== See also ==
- Out-of-home advertising
- Skyscaping
- Skywriting
