= Skyscape =

Skyscape may refer to:

- Skyscape art, art which depicts representations of the sky
- Skyscape (imprint), publishing imprint of Amazon Publishing for children's books
- Skyscaping, the arrangement of natural materials to form words visible from the air
