= Catherine Rob =

Botanist

Catherine Muriel Rob FLS
- Born: 21 February 2016; Thirsk, England
- Died: 6 February 1975 (aged 68)
- Other names: Kitty Rob
- Occupation: Botanist

Catherine "Kit" Muriel Rob FLS (21 February 1906 – 6 February 1975) was a British botanist. She lectured and ran courses on botany, and was active in the Yorkshire Naturalists' Union. Rob was recorder for flowering plants in North Yorkshire for thirty-seven years. Rob was also member of the Botanical Society of the British Isles and served as its vice-president from 1961 to 1963.

== Biography ==
Rob was born in 1906 at Catton Hall near Thirsk and lived there her whole life. She was educated at home by governesses, and was a self-taught botanist, having not received any formal botanical training. She joined the Wild Flower Society at age 17 and remained involved with it throughout her life. She served in the army during the Second World War with the rank of corporal and was based at Catterick Garrison, where she worked as a cook. Rob gave lectures on botany to many learned societies and ran WEA courses in botany.

Rob joined the Yorkshire Naturalists' Union in 1934 and became the recorder for flowering plants in North Yorkshire in 1935, remaining in this role for 37 years. She variously served as Secretary (1955–1958) of the Botanical section of the YNU, as its Chairman in 1970, and has President of the whole Union in 1969. Rob was a member of the Botanical Society of the British Isles and served as its vice-president from 1961 to 1963. She also served as the Vice-President of the Yorkshire Philosophical Society. She was elected a Fellow of the Linnean Society, and the plant Rubus robbii is named after her.

In her later years she bred Cardigan Welsh Corgis, including a Best of Breed named 'Echium of Hezelclose' at Crufts in 1968. Echium is a genus of flowering plants in the borage family.

=== Family ===
Rob had two brothers, one of who was named Charles. Rob was a carer for her mother and two aunts, all of whom also lived at Catton Hall.

== Publications ==
- Rob, C. M. 1963. "An Introduction to the Catalogue of the 'More Rare Wild Plants' which were to be found in the Castle Howard districts", Annual Report of the Council of the Yorkshire Philosophical Society for 1962. 20-31.
- Dony, J. G., Rob, C. M., and Perring, F. 1974. English names of wild flowers, a recommended list of the Botanical Society of the British Isles.
