= Footpads =

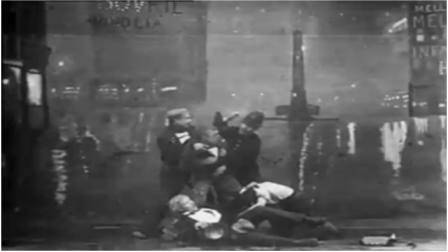
- Screenshot from the film
- Directed by: Robert W. Paul
- Produced by: Robert W. Paul
- Cinematography: Birt Acres
- Production company: Paul's Animatograph Works
- Release date: May 1895
- Running time: 24 secs
- Country: United Kingdom
- Language: Silent

Footpads is an 1895 British short silent drama film that was directed by Robert W. Paul. It features a top-hatted pedestrian against a rainy London backdrop, who is assaulted by three footpads and rescued by a passing policeman.

The "atmospheric" film "is chiefly of interest for its imaginative approach to background décor" where, according to Michael Brooke of BFI Screenonline, "some effort has been made towards establishing a sense of realism".

Roland-François Lack of University College London points out that this painted backdrop looks like "a hybrid of Trafalgar Square, with its electric advertisement for Bovril, and Piccadilly Circus, with the advertisement for Mellin's Food", but has discovered that it in fact represents Ludgate Circus.
