= Pamela Schwerdt =

Horticulturalist (b. 1931, d. 2009)

Pamela Schwerdt MBE (5 April 1931 - 11 September 2009) was the joint head gardener at Sissinghurst Castle Garden from 1959 to 1990, and a pioneering horticulturalist.

== Early life and education ==
Pamela Schwerdt was born on 5 April 1931 in Surrey, the granddaughter of Edith Vere Dent, who founded the Wild Flower Society in 1886, and the daughter of Violet Schwerdt MBE, who was subsequently editor of the society newsletter following on from her mother and sister. From 1936 the family lived in Newfoundland then Nova Scotia, returning to England in 1945, where Pam attended Lady Eleanor Holles School in Hampton, Middlesex.

In 1951, aged 18, she joined Waterperry School of Horticulture for Ladies, at Waterperry Gardens in Oxfordshire. She was attracted by the fact that the clothes list included "two pairs of gumboots and a mackintosh" rather than the "cap and gown" required at Wye College, and this reflected the practical nature of the training offered by the school's founder, Beatrix Havergal. Whilst there she formed a close friendship with Sibylle Kreutzberger, a fellow student, with whom she was to work for the rest of her life. She passed the Waterperry diploma and was also awarded the Chittenden Prize for achieving the highest marks in the Royal Horticultural Society's National Diploma of Horticulture. She stayed on the teaching staff after the course, remaining for eight years in total.

== Career ==
By 1959 both Schwerdt and Kreutzberger felt Waterperry was "like being at school forever". Schwerdt contacted various gardening correspondents, including Vita Sackville-West, in search of a walled garden to start a nursery. Sackville-West said she did not know of a site but subsequently wrote to say she needed a head gardener for the garden she had created at Sissinghurst Castle: would Pam be interested? Schwerdt replied "yes, but we are two".

From 1959 until retirement in 1990 she was the joint head gardener, with Kreutzberger, at the garden at Sissinghurst Castle in Kent. Kreutzberger focused on propagation, and Schwerdt had a higher public profile, although they were often seen and addressed as a pair. "Women were rare in horticulture in those days", recalled Kreutzberger in 2006. "When we first went to Sissinghurst, people used to point at us as though we were baboons at the zoo."

She served on several RHS committees, including the Floral A Committee (now Herbaceous Committee) for 32 years 1977–2008 and the Floral Trials Subcommittee (now Floral Trials Assessment Panel) for 30 years 1979–2009, both latterly as vice chair, and she was often a judge at RHS shows. She was made an associate of honour of the Royal Horticultural Society in 1980 and received the Victoria Medal of Honour in 2006, at the same time as Kreutzberger. She was appointed MBE in 1990. In 1992 she received, with Kreutzberger, the third International Carlo Scarpa Prize for Gardens awarded by the Fondazione Benetton.

In 1991 the two women bought a house together at Manor Farm, Condicote, near Stow-on-the-Wold in Gloucestershire, where they made a garden that was much admired.

Schwerdt died on 11 September 2009 at the age of 78, from a lung cancer caused by asbestos exposure, although the coroner could not determine where this came from. She never married.

== Horticultural innovation and influence ==
The widely copied "Sissinghurst look", owed as much, if not more, to Schwerdt and Kreuzberger as to Sackville-West (who died in 1962, only 3 years after the new head gardeners joined). "It's as much their garden as Vita's," said Alexis Datta, head gardener in 2010.

Signature characteristics were planting a profusion of flowers in colourful tonal displays, dense rose beds, the use of topiary and trellises to give sculptural shapes, and selective wildness. Partly by using annuals and tender perennials, they were able to make planting that Sackville-West considered to be over by mid July, last into autumn. This way of extending the season was copied in other gardens owned by the National Trust, and by home gardeners. During her tenure, visiting figures rose from about 6,000 a year in 1959 to 197,000 in 1991 (the year after she retired).

She was passionate about the need for close observance of plants, which she described as "living with plants". She gave lectures, in the UK (including on the English Garden School's Plant and Plantsmanship course for eight years) and USA, although in general shunned publicity, saying "Gardening doesn't need celebrities, it's a celebrity in itself".

Their work was documented in various books, including "Gardening at Sissinghurst" by Tony Lord (ISBN 0-7112-0991-X) and "Sissinghurst: Portrait of a Garden" by Jane Brown (ISBN 0-7538-0437-9).
