= Footpad =

Robber of pedestrians

In archaic terminology, a footpad is a robber or thief specialising in pedestrian victims. The term was used widely from the 16th century until the 19th century, but gradually fell out of common use. A footpad was considered a low criminal, as opposed to the mounted highwayman who in certain cases might gain fame as well as notoriety. Footpads operated during the Elizabethan era and until the beginning of the 19th century.

== Etymology ==
According to the American Heritage Dictionary, the origin of the term is not entirely clear, but it may be a concatenation of foot and the word pad, related to path. This would indicate a robber who is on foot, as opposed to his equestrian counterpart.

== Robbing ==
Footpads always operated on foot and robbed people by first putting them in fear. Social and economic conditions, the high cost of horses, and their precarious state led them to commit robberies in the streets. Criminals found it safer and advantageous to move in darkness to intimidate their victim, escape, and diminish the possibility of being recognised by witnesses. Violence was perpetrated as a means to ensure a rapid escape from the crime scene. This was the reason why footpad assaults were often accompanied by threats, violence, and in the worst case by murder.

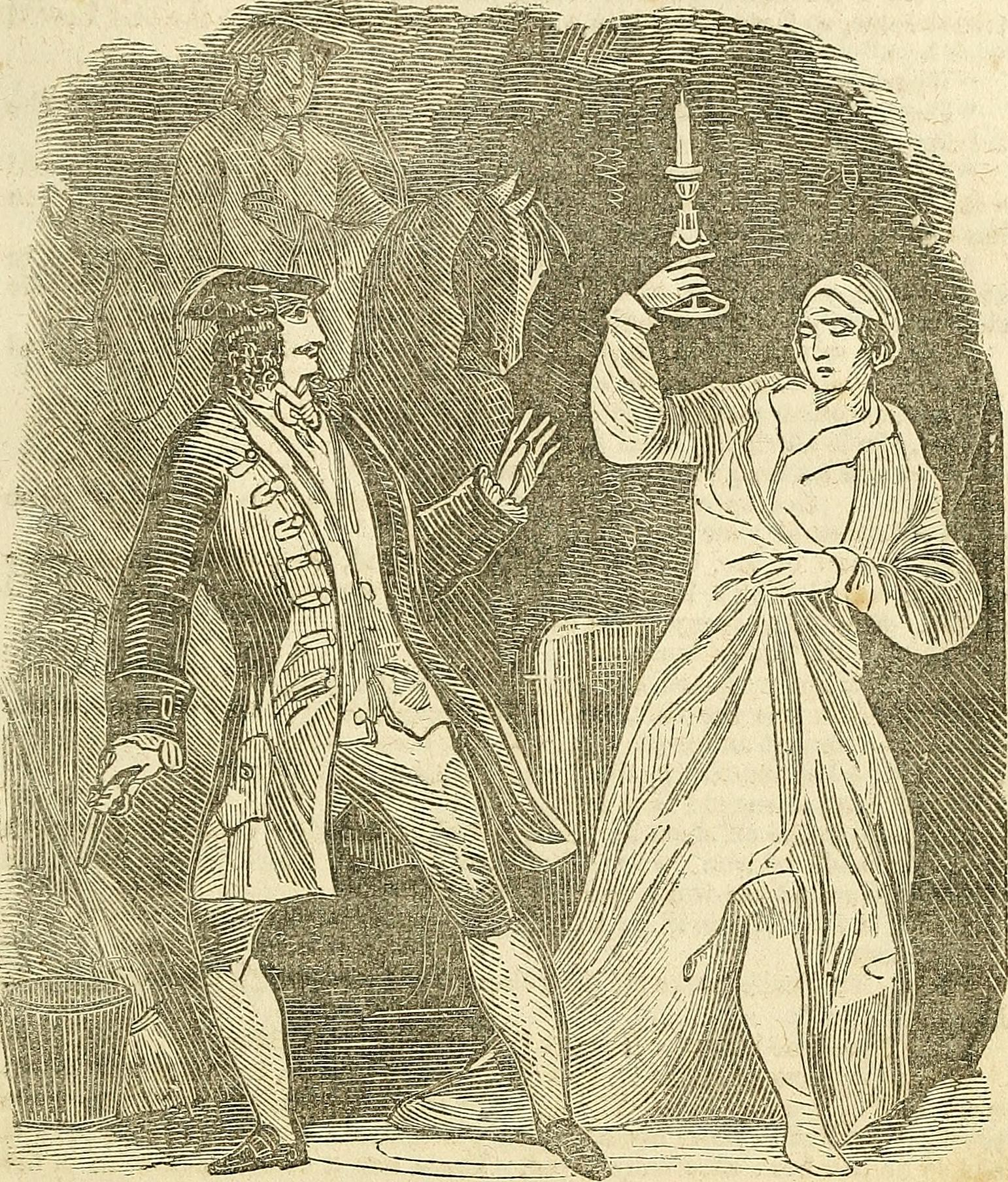
Life on the road – or, Claude, Turpin, and Jack, being a complete account of the most daring adventures of the notorious highwaymen, Claude Duval, Dick Turpin, and Sixteen-string Jack, 1800

== Criminal system ==
A number of thieves operated by necessity and joined existing gangs. In the 1720s London was dominated by several large gangs. A gang consisted of an association of different sub-groups of members who committed robberies together, since acting alone was less fruitful than operating with the support of companions. This organized criminal system was the basis of a sense of cohesion at the lowest level of society. The loot was equally divided by the whole gang, and every member took an active part in the criminal operation.

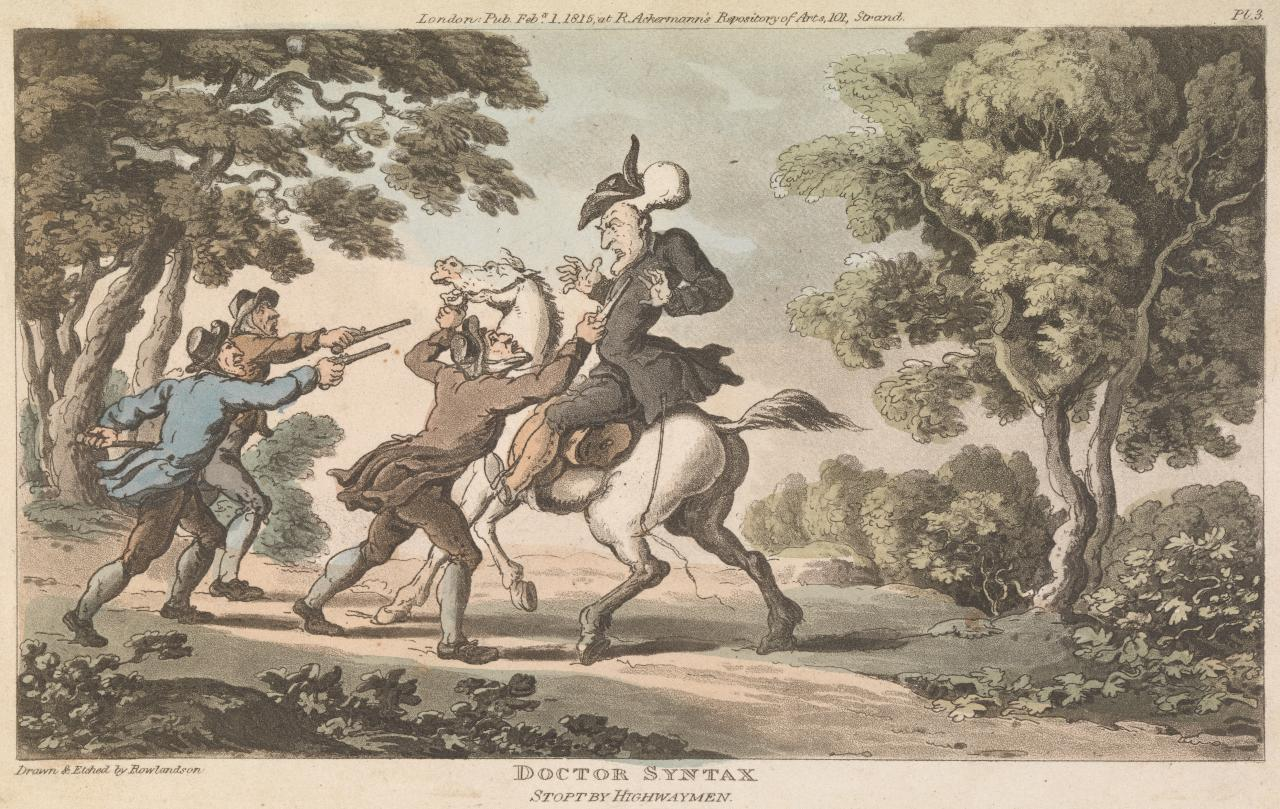
Doctor Syntax and Highwaymen, 1813 – Engraving by Thomas Rowlandson. Doctor Syntax – a popular literary character of the early nineteenth century – on horseback, stopped by three robbers armed with pistols

== Notable criminals and gangs ==
While robbery in the streets was common, most of the men who committed theft were not necessarily violent, and in some cases their crimes were perpetrated because of need. At the same time, some criminals became notable for their brutality. Such was the case with Matthew Clark, who became notorious because of his numerous crimes, including the murder of a young woman, a maid working in a house he was burgling, for which he was condemned to hanging in chains.

A brief historical account of the lives of the six notorious street-robbers, executed at Kingston is a 1726 anonymous text first attributed to Daniel Defoe by James Crossley. According to the pamphlet this group was a small detachment from a large gang which originally consisted of about 32 members, including the noted Joseph Blake, alias "Blueskin", and Jack Sheppard.

Since the majority of crimes happened during the night, when criminals could act undisturbed, protected by the darkness, in the late 17th century guarding the streets became a priority to prevent crime. Night watchmen guarded the streets from 9:00 or 10:00 pm until sunrise. Notwithstanding this new strategy, footpads continued to operate.

The political world paid serious attention to the crime question and, during the 18th century, the institutions reinforced the legislative system. Violent offences were punished without mercy, and eminent political figures did not hesitate to express their severe opinion about the difficulty. The magistrate John Fielding was among those who were interested in changing the social condition of the time. In a letter of June 1764, addressed to the Secretary to the Treasury Charles Jenkinson, he wrote about a footpad assault near Tyburn and Tottenham Court Road.

The introduction of an efficient surveillance system in the streets was also the subject of reflection by scholars, intellectuals and writers like Daniel Defoe, whose pamphlet Augusta Triumphans dealt with street robbery prevention. Several changes were made to the urban environment, and street lighting began to appear.

== Punishments ==
Accused criminals were brought to trial at the Old Bailey, the Central criminal Court of England and Wales, and if found guilty, they were punished. From the late 17th century to the early 20th, those found guilty of felonies could be subjected to different types of punishments depending on the case. Hanging was the most common penalty for the majority of crimes but during the 18th century it was scaled down, and new punishments were practised.

Theft by footpads was often categorized as a violent felony. The penalty for violent robbery was hanging on the gallows. Judges occasionally condemned those convicted of egregious crimes to hanging in chains near the scene of the offence. Until 1783, when the procession to the Tyburn gallows was abolished, executions were carried out in public as a deterrent to crime.

Different factors determined if the prisoner was condemned to death or given a lesser punishment. Evidence, the nature of the offence, and the offender's conduct contributed to his or her punishment. Penal transportation and imprisonment were instituted as alternative punishments, which were often perceived as a condition of pardon and mercy granted by the king.

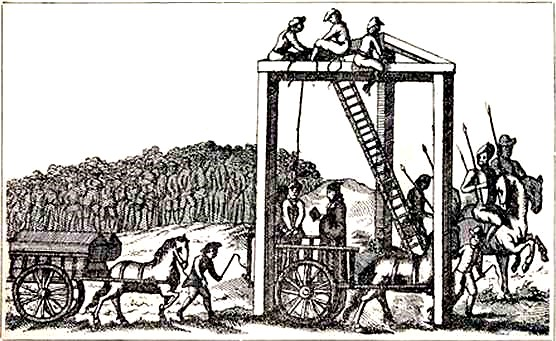
Tyburn tree

== Literature and culture ==
One of the most remarkable literary portrayals of the illicit side of society is Defoe's Colonel Jack (1722), a novel which has the shades of crime fiction. Following the theme of Moll Flanders, it shares many crucial elements necessary to understand how crime and justice were perceived at the end of the 17th and the beginning of the 18th century.

Footpads are featured in an 1895 British silent film whose production is attributed to Robert W. Paul.
