= John Mackenzie Bacon =

English astronomer, aeronaut and clergyman

The Rev. John Mackenzie Bacon FRAS
- Born: 19 June 1846; Lambourn Woodlands, Berkshire, England
- Died: 26 December 1904 (aged 58); Cold Ash, Berkshire, England
- Resting place: Swallowfield churchyard
- Education: Trinity College, Cambridge
- Spouses: Gertrude Bacon (m. 1871; died 1894); Stella Bacon (m. 1903)
- Children: 4, including Gertrude Bacon
- Relatives: John Bacon Jr. (grandfather); John Bacon (great-grandfather)

The Rev. John Mackenzie Bacon FRAS (19 June 1846 – 26 December 1904) was an English astronomer, aeronaut, and clergyman.

== Early life and education ==
Bacon was born on 19 June 1846 in Lambourn Woodlands to John Bacon (1809–1871), the vicar of Woodlands St Mary, and Mary Lousada, who was of Spanish descent. Through his father, Bacon was the grandson of the sculptor John Bacon Jr. and the great-grandson of sculptor John Bacon. Educated at home and at a coaching establishment in Charlton, Bacon entered Trinity College, Cambridge in October 1865. Bacon's close friends at Cambridge included William Kingdon Clifford, Francis Maitland Balfour, and Edward Henry Palmer. Awarded a foundation scholarship in 1869, Bacon graduated the same year from the Mathematical Tripos.

== Career ==
He was elected a Fellow of the Royal Astronomical Society in 1888. Bacon and John Nevil Maskelyne filed a patent for inflating balloons. Both John and his daughter Gertrude were members of the British Astronomical Association. The BAA organised expeditions to observe total solar eclipses, which John and Gertrude went on. The first was to Vadsø in Finnmark, Norway (eclipse date 9 August 1896), which was unsuccessful due to cloudy weather. The second was to Buxar in India (eclipse date 22 January 1898). Here they succeeded in filming the eclipse, but unfortunately the film has been lost. The Bacons also went on a ballon flight in November 1899 piloted by Stanley Spencer to observe the Leonid meteors. The flight took off from Newbury at 4:00am on Thursday 16 November and drifted westward with the flight ending near Neath. Very few meteors were observed however. A third eclipse expedition was to Wadesborough, North Carolina (eclipse date 28 May 1900) and was also successful.

== Personal life ==
On 11 April 1871, Bacon married Gertrude Bacon (née Myers; 1849–1894), the daughter of the vicar and Trinity College fellow Charles John Myers. The couple had three surviving children including the aeronaut, astronomer, and botanist Gertrude Bacon. Bacon later married Stella Bacon (née Goodwood) on 7 October 1903, with whom he had a daughter.

On 26 December 1904, Bacon died at his home in Cold Ash and was buried at Swallowfield churchyard in the Berkshire village of Swallowfield.
