= Edith Dent =

British botanist

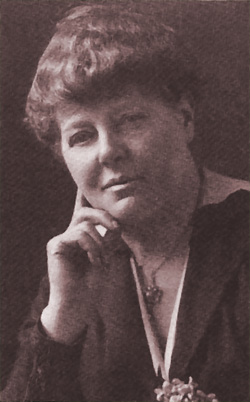
Edith Vere Dent

Edith Vere Dent née Annesley (1863–1948) was an amateur botanist and wild flower enthusiast who is remembered as founder of the UK Wild Flower Society. She was also an organiser for the Red Cross and her work in the First World War was recognised with an OBE.

== Family life ==
Dent was the daughter of the Rev. Francis Hanbury and Maria Charlotte Annesley. Born on 25 September 1863 in Limpsfield Surrey, she and the family moved to Clifford Chambers near Stratford-upon-Avon in the 1870s when her father became rector there. After leaving school she had responsibility for her youngest sister's education, and she also kept a diary where she recorded her observations of wild flowers. These two things led to her, at the age of 23, founding the Wild Flower Society which was initially an educational club for a few local children.

In 1893 she married Robert Wilkinson Dent at a "large and fashionable wedding". Their life together started in Tunbridge Wells but in 1903 they moved to Flass, a substantial country house near Shap which had belonged to previous generations of the Dent family. There they were prominent members of the local gentry and took on a number of leadership roles in the area. Edith Dent was president of the Westmorland Red Cross and founding president of Crosby Ravensworth Women's Institute. She “took a large share” in "all the leading Westmorland activities" according to her friend and obituarist Gertrude Foggitt.

Edith Dent had six children. Two of her four sons were killed in the First World War and she wore black ever after. Her daughter Hilda Dent served as president of the Wild Flower Society after her mother's death on 12 October 1948. Hilda's older sister Violet Schwerdt took over in 1956. She continued the work into her 90s "creating a unique family record stretching well over 100 years".

== Organisations ==
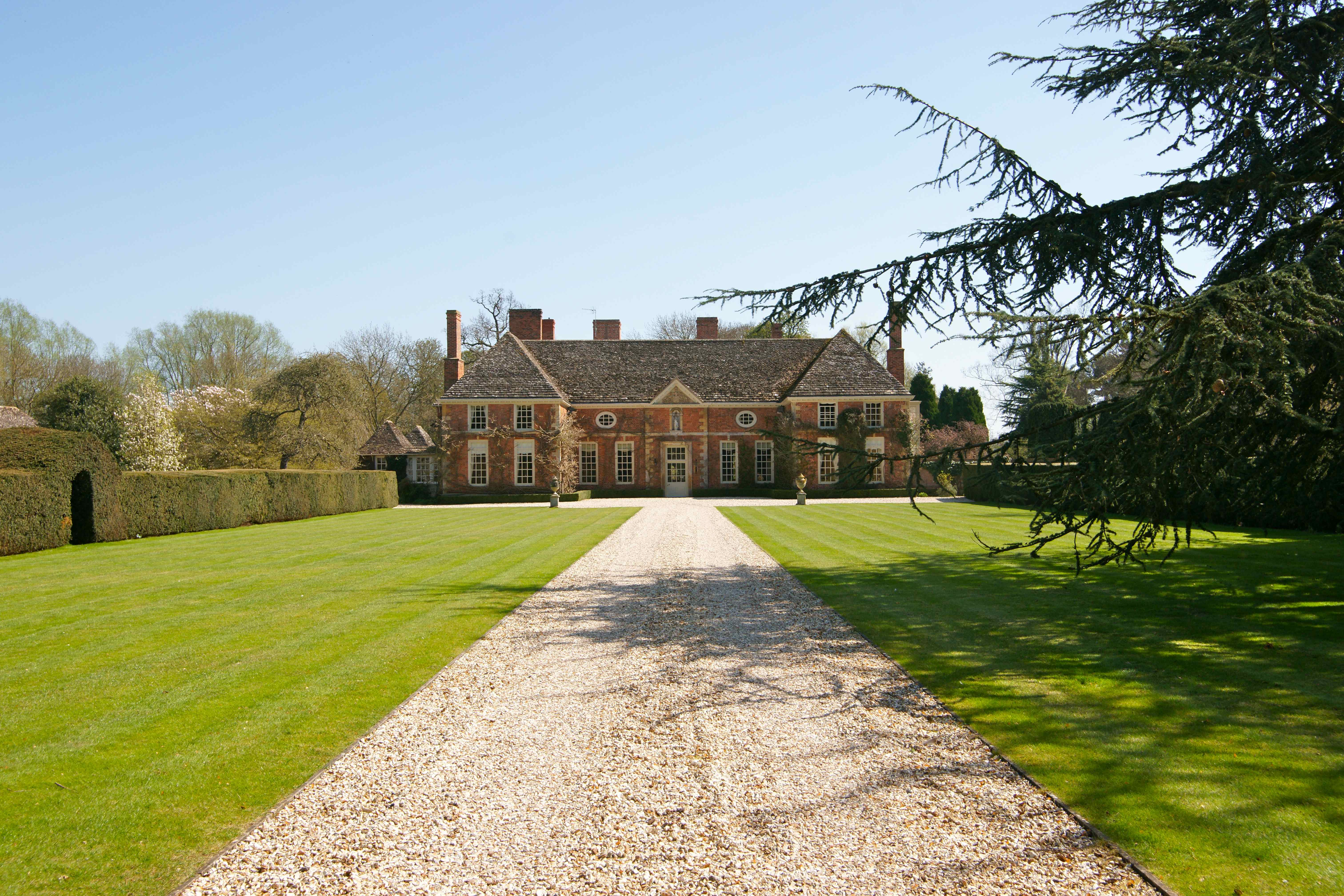
Clifford Chambers Manor: the house where Edith Annesley lived when she founded the Wild Flower Society.

As the Wild Flower Society grew to accommodate adults, some of them expert botanists, Dent edited a Wild Flower Magazine which came out every two months (less frequently now). She always wrote an editor's letter and published articles which were sometimes by eminent botanists. She also attended to correspondence, presided over numerous different branches, managed subscriptions, published a Wild Flower Diary to help members identify plants, and initiated a series of botanical tea parties in London. Although Dent was self-deprecating about her botanical expertise, she played a significant role in the world of British botany, presiding over the society she founded for 60 years, and helping it flourish.

Dent was president of the Westmorland Red Cross and during the First World War she organised Voluntary Aid Detachment (VAD) groups which supported hospitals and other services. Fundraising was an important part of her work too: "… our able lady presidents, the Countess of Lonsdale for Cumberland and Mrs Dent for Westmorland… have collected extremely large sums of money, and distributed many thousands of parcels of comforts to our troops and Navy…" was part of a speech printed in the Lancashire Evening Post. Her work with the Red Cross was cited when she received an OBE in 1920.
