= Flogo =

Foam "balloon" formed by soap bubbles

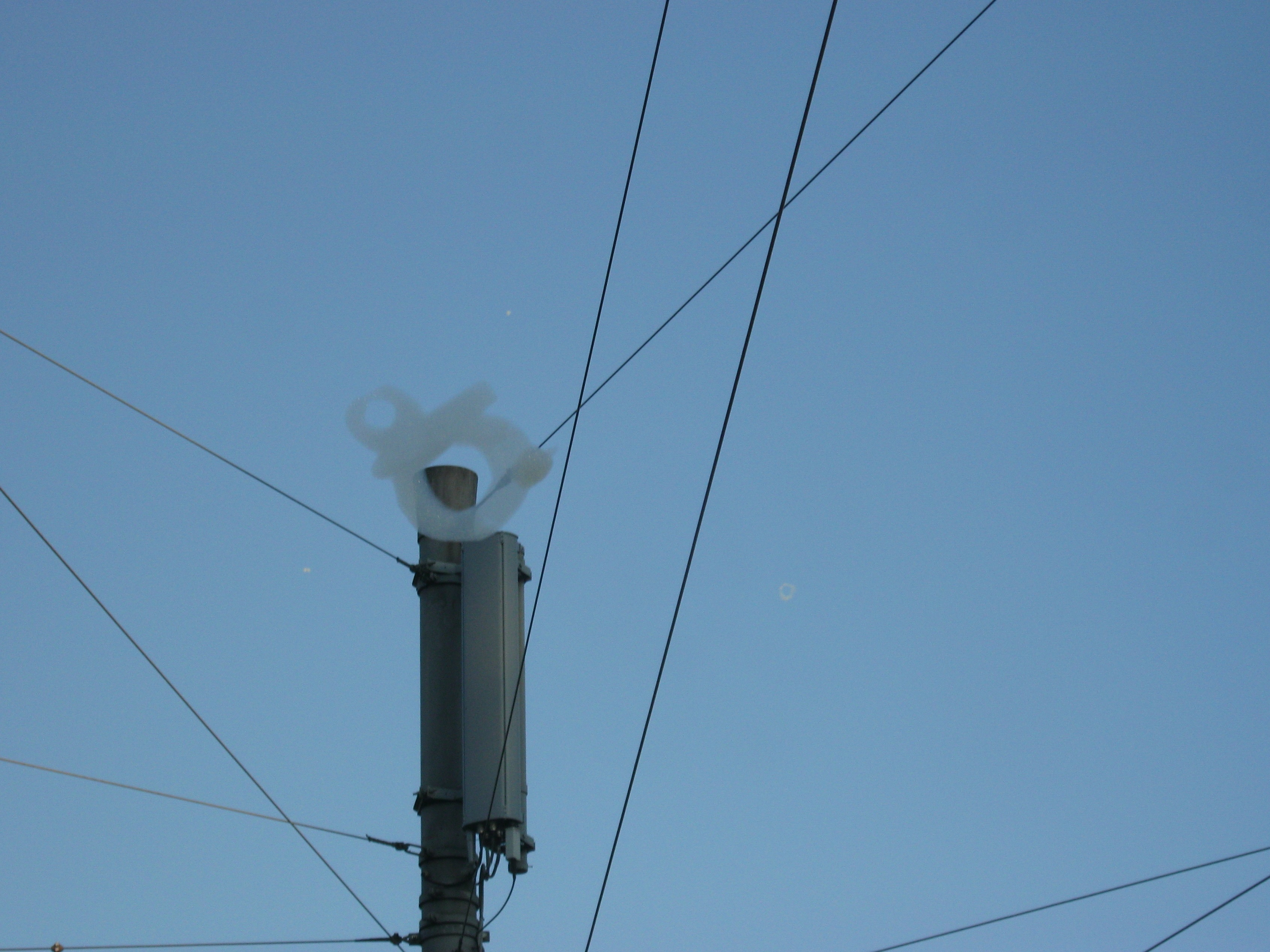
Flogo in Streetparade 2013, Zürich

A Flogo (portmanteau of floating and logo) or foam balloon, is a stable mass of lighter-than-air soap bubbles formed into a specific shape. They are not balloons, as they have no envelope, but consist merely of a condensed grouping of soap bubbles filled with a mixture of helium and air. They are shaped by being molded through a die inserted in the top of the generating machine.

It is possible to create foam balloons with a diameter of more than 1 metre. Identical foam balloons can be manufactured with the same machine in quick repetition. Flogos are most frequently for "skyvertising" or aerial advertising purposes, since they can be manufactured easily in the form of corporate or team logos.

In principle, wind conditions in the lower atmosphere can be easily monitored with flogos. Foam balloons are not stable long-term, but decay after some hours. Nevertheless, they can reach heights of several kilometres up.

== See also ==
- Global Special Effects
