= Joanna Charlotte Davy =

English botanist, botanical collector and painter

Joanna Charlotte Davy née Flemmich was an English plant collector and painter. She was a well-known figure in British botanical circles in the first half of the twentieth century and was active in various societies including the Botanical Society of the British Isles which made her an honorary member in 1950. During this period she was generally known as Lady Davy or, on formal records, Johanna Charlotte Davy.

== Personal life ==
Born in London in February 1865 to Charlotte and John Flemmich, a merchant, she grew up in Roehampton. After marrying James Stewart Davy (1848-1915) in 1886 she lived most of her life in Sussex and Surrey. Her husband was a civil servant involved in poor law administration who was knighted in 1902. They had two children.

== Field botany ==
Her serious interest in British flora developed after moving to Copyhold near Cuckfield in 1893. The botanist G. Claridge Druce became a friend and frequent visitor with whom Davy explored the countryside around her home, contributing numerous finds to records of Sussex flora. In 1899 she joined the Wild Flower Society which increased her interest and contacts with other plant enthusiasts. She lived in Pyrford from 1909 before moving to West Byfleet in 1922 where she kept "open house" for botanists of different ages and levels of experience. She was a regular contributor to records of Surrey flora.

She travelled across the British Isles on plant-hunting expeditions in groups which she sometimes led. On a trip to Scotland with Gertrude Bacon, they discovered Carex microglochin, never before found growing in the UK. Some of her plant specimens are now in the J. E. Lousley herbarium at Reading University, and others at Oxford University and Kew Gardens. The Natural History Museum, London has 48 watercolours of orchids by Davy in their collection.
