= Stanley Spencer (aeronaut) =

English aeronaut (1868–1906)

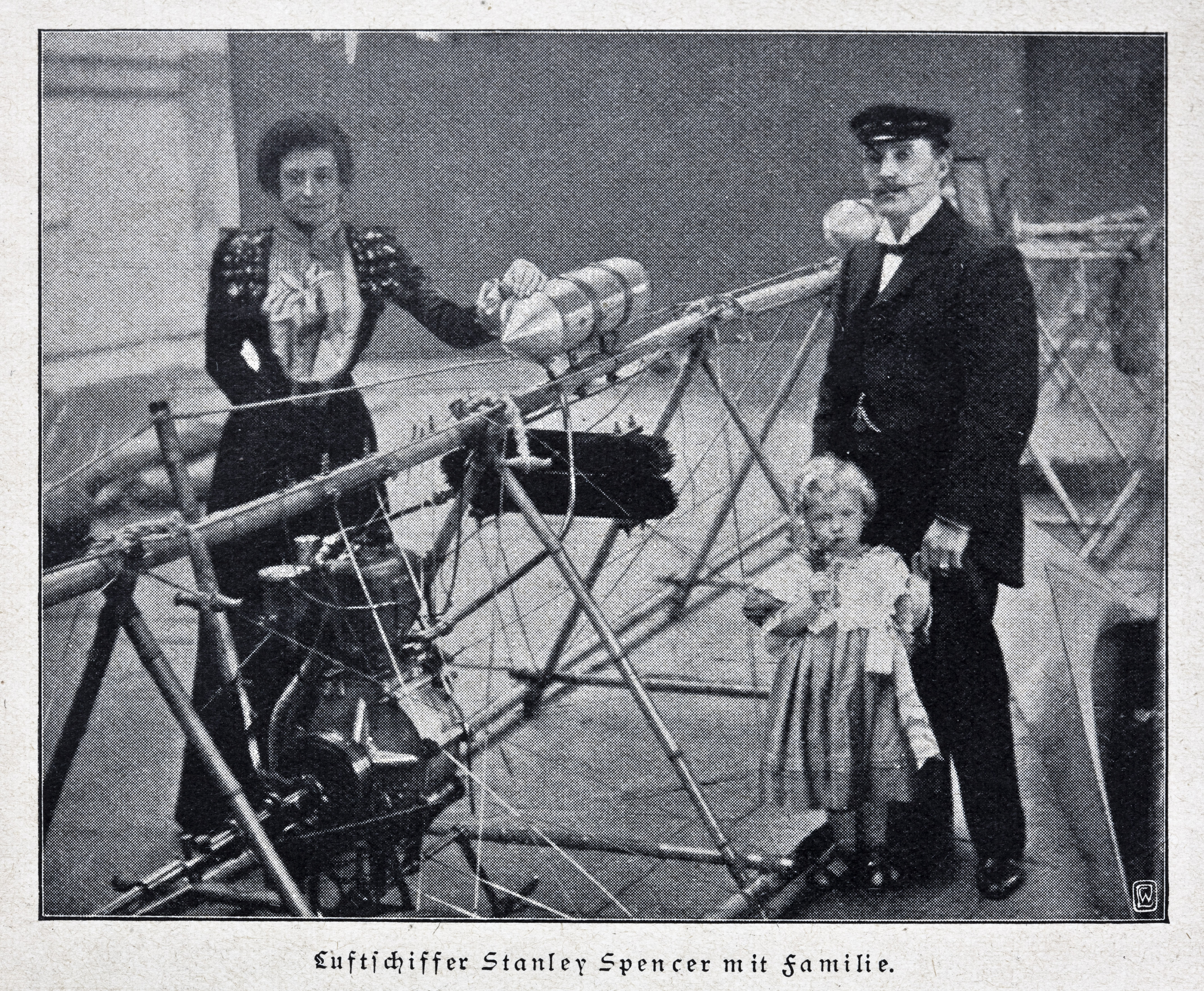
- Stanley Spencer with his family and airship frame made of bamboo
- Born: Stanley Edward Spencer; 1868; Islington, London, England
- Died: 27 January 1906 (aged 37–38); Malta
- Occupation: Aeronaut
- Spouse: Rose Isabel Hawkins
- Children: 1 daughter

Stanley Edward Spencer (1868–1906) was an early English aeronaut, famous for ballooning and parachuting in several countries, and later for building and flying an airship over London in 1902.

Stanley's family had a history of flying: all his five siblings were also aeronauts, with Arthur and Percival the more well-known; his father Charles Green Spencer pioneered gliding and founded the balloon factory C.G. Spencer & Sons in London; and his grandfather Edward had flown balloons with Charles Green since 1836. On 15 September 1898, Stanley piloted a hydrogen balloon for the meteorologist Arthur Berson in what was believed to be a record ascent to 27,500 feet. On 15 November 1899, Spencer ascended with John Mackenzie Bacon and Gertrude Bacon to observe the Leonid meteor shower from above the clouds. Ten hours later, their balloon landed near Neath, South Wales, narrowly avoiding drifting out over the Atlantic.

== The Spencer airships ==
=== Spencer's first airship ===
The success of the airships designed and flown by Alberto Santos Dumont in Paris led Spencer to believe that he could build an improved version. To fund the construction costs, he entered into a sponsorship contract with Mellin and Company of Peckham, the manufacturer of "Mellin's Food", a leading brand of infant formula "for babies and invalids". The sum of £1,500 was payable in return for twenty-five return flights carrying an advertisement for "Mellin's Food".

The airship was assembled in Spencer's balloon shed at Crystal Palace, London, then a popular site for balloon ascents. The envelope of the airship measured some 75 feet (23 m) in length and had a capacity of 20,000 cubic feet (570 m^{3}) of hydrogen. The gondola was an open framework of bamboo poles, on which was mounted a 3.5-horsepower (2.6 kW) Simms petrol engine. There was only space for a single person. The engine drove a wooden propeller which worked in tractor configuration; previous airships had used a pusher configuration, which, being mounted at the back, ran the risk of igniting any escaping gas. A fan pump and valve designed by Spencer replaced any lost gas with air, to prevent the envelope from deforming. A further safety feature was that in the event of a catastrophic failure of the envelope, Spencer claimed that it was designed to collapse into the shape of a parachute.

Spencer's first airship in flight, showing the advertising for "Mellin's Food"

The completed airship was reported to have made its first flight some time in late June 1902. There followed a series of trial flights at the Crystal Palace polo ground. On 14 July, the airship was piloted by Spencer's wife, Rose, on a powered flight in a circuit around the ground, "under perfect control" according to one newspaper report. If the various press reports of the event are correct, this makes Mrs Spencer the first woman to pilot a powered aircraft. Although designed to be a single-seater, Spencer flew with his three-month-old baby daughter Gladys on at least one occasion, claiming that she was the first female to have flown in an airship.

During a further trial flight on Friday, 19 September 1902, the conditions seemed right for Stanley Spencer to try to equal Santos Dumont's feat of flying around the Eiffel Tower, by himself flying around the dome of Saint Paul's Cathedral in the City of London. The airship set off from Crystal Palace at 16:15, watched by a crowd of cheering spectators. Travelling at an altitude of up to 300 feet (91 m), it soon became apparent that central London had become obscured by mist, so Spencer headed west, making a low pass near Clapham Common, causing "intense astonishment among the thousands of persons in the streets..." Spencer continued across the River Thames at Chelsea Bridge and continued over Kensington and Earl's Court. During the flight, he frequently flew around in circles to demonstrate the airship's maneuverability, and threw out small rubber balls, to demonstrate "what an army airship could do with bombs". As darkness approached, Spencer landed in a field at Eastcote, near Harrow; he claimed that the airship "came down so lightly, that a child underneath it would not have been harmed". The distance travelled in the three-hour flight was about 30 miles (48 km), about three times the distance of any of Santos Dumont's previous flights.

Spencer used the same airship to fly the 17 miles (27 km) from Blackpool to Preston in Lancashire in a "high wind" on 21 October 1902. In November of the same year, he flew from the Isle of Man across the Irish Sea to Dumfries. The airship must have been modified because he took fellow aeronaut John Mackenzie Bacon on the flight; newspaper reports state that Bacon also took the controls. On 28 October 1903, Spencer took Mellin and Company to court in an effort to recover the final £500 of advertising fees, which had been withheld on the grounds that the stipulated twenty-five return flights of the airship had not been completed. After an argument about the exact meaning of a "return flight", the judge, Justice Darling, ruled in favour of Mellin's.

=== Spencer's second airship ===
Stanley Spencer soon directed his energies to the construction of a larger and more powerful airship. The envelope was 88 feet (27 m) long, with a capacity of 26,000 cubic feet (740 m^{3}). The gondola was an open frame of ash wood spars, on which mounted a Thomas Green & Son engine of 35 horsepower (26 kW) that drove a pair of wooden propellers, designed by Hiram Maxim. The controls were activated by means of Bowden cables, the first time that these had been used on an airship.

On 11 July 1903, the new airship was prepared for its first flight at the Ranelagh Club in Barnes, Surrey. However, it slewed sideways during takeoff and one of the propellers was smashed against the ground. Nothing daunted, Spencer proceeded to dismount the engine and the airship was flown as an unpowered balloon, landing three hours later near Ongar, Essex.

He later reverted to a single propeller and carried advertising for the London Evening News. On 17 September 1903, Spencer attempted to circumnavigate the dome of Saint Paul's; the streets below were crowded with expectant spectators. Despite breaking some telephone cables on takeoff at Crystal Palace, the airship arrived at Saint Paul's at about 700 feet (210 m) and flew a semi circle to the east but was unable to turn back towards the south due to the wind. After several attempts, he gave up the struggle and turned away to the north, eventually landing near New Barnet.

=== Spencer's third airship ===
One source suggests that Spencer planned a third and yet larger airship, 150 feet (46 metres) long, driven by two 50 horse power engines with accommodation for ten passengers and crew members.

== Family life and death ==
Spencer married Rose Isabel Hawkins on 9 September 1895 at Hornsey. A son, William was born in 1897 but died, aged just 5 months. They had a daughter, Gladys Rose in 1899.

Spencer died of typhus on Malta on 27 January 1906 whilst on the return journey from China and India to England.
