= Global Special Effects =

American special effects company

Global Special Effects, formally known as Snow Masters Inc., is a special effects company headquartered in Lexington, Alabama. The firm, founded in 1992 by a former magician, specializes in artificial snow, cryo, smoke, bubble and fog machines. The company's products have been used in music videos such as "Back to December" by Taylor Swift and "Mistletoe" by Justin Bieber, film productions such as Harry Potter and Lucky, television shows such as Fear Factor, and at major theme parks around the world.

== History ==
The company was founded in 1992 after a former magician utilized a system for producing artificial snow to use in his magic shows. The company developed a 98% water and 2% surfactant solution which evaporates shortly after touching the ground, known as Evaporative Snow, as well as machines to distribute the substance in various forms. Global Special Effects has subsequently branched into other products, including fog, cryo, confetti, foam, scent, bubbles, smoke, and Flogos machines.

=== Federal raid and criminal conviction ===
In September 2021, federal agents raided Global Special Effects as part of an investigation into money laundering, bribery, and fraud related to government contracts. Company owner Francisco Guerra was indicted and pleaded guilty to conspiracy to commit bribery. In May 2025, Guerra was sentenced to five years in federal prison.

== Products ==
Global Special Effects' main product offering is its proprietary artificial snow, known as Evaporative Snow, and range of snow machines, which sell for $300 to $5,000 each. Subsidiary companies of Global Special Effects include Flogos, whose machines produce floating shapes constructed from helium-filled soap bubbles. Flogos has been contracted to produce custom cloud logos for major companies and organizations all over the world. Another operating company, Foam Masters, manufactures foam machines for use at parties and auditoriums.

== See also ==
- Foam balloon
