= Wild Flower Society (UK) =

The Wild Flower Society is a society for a wide range of flower enthusiasts, from serious botanists to beginners. It arranges field trips and meetings, publishes the Wild Flower Magazine, offers prizes and has a children's section. Most members keep diaries of observations, and may photograph plants.

== History ==
It was founded as an educational children's club in 1886 by Edith Vere Annesley, later Edith Vere Dent. The club grew to include adults, and by the 1920s members included expert botanists. The botanist George Claridge Druce called the society “the Botanical Nursery” because it nurtured potential botanists. Among its members were Noel Sandwith, curator at Kew Gardens, who first discovered Scorzonera humilis, or viper's grass, growing in Britain, botanist Eleanor Vachell who discovered Limosella aquatica x subulata in Glamorgan, and Gertrude Foggitt who recorded Carex microglochin on Ben Lawers, along with the botanist Lady Joanna Charlotte Davy. More recently, the botanist and ecologist Ghillean Prance, president of the society, is someone who first built up a knowledge of flowering plants through his membership of the society and his wild flower diary.

Edith Dent (1863-1948) edited the magazine, bi-monthly at that time, which she started in 1896. After her death in 1948, her daughter Hilda Sophia Annesley Dent (1903-1956) became president and editor. She died in 1956 and her sister Violet Vere Charlotte Schwerdt (1900-1996) took over. Schwerdt was made an MBE in 1986 for her work with the society. Her daughter Pamela Schwerdt was head gardener at Sissinghurst and was said to have inherited her interest in flowers through her mother.

== Sources ==
- Wild Flower Society: Floral fixation, The Independent, 23 August, 2010
- Obituary of Mrs Edith Vere Dent by Gertrude Foggitt, in the Botanical Society Year Book, 1949
- The Wild Flower Society website
