= Gertrude Bacon =

British writer, aeronaut and botanist (1874–1949)

Gertrude Bacon FRAS
- John Bacon, Gertrude Bacon, and Stanley Spencer
- Born: 19 April 1874; Cambridge, England
- Died: 22 December 1949 (aged 75); Sway, Hampshire, England
- Other name: Gertrude Foggitt
- Occupations: author, aeronautical pioneer, astronomer, botanist
- Notable work: Memories of Land and Sky, Ballons, airships and flying machines, The record of an aeronaut, being the life of John M. Bacon
- Spouse: Thomas Jackson Foggitt (m. 1929; died 1934)
- Father: John Mackenzie Bacon
- Relatives: John Bacon Jr. (great-grandfather); John Bacon (great-great-grandfather)
- Awards: British War Medal

Gertrude Bacon FRAS (married name Foggitt; 19 April 1874 – 22 December 1949) was a British aeronautical pioneer. She achieved a considerable number of "firsts" for women in aeronautics, as well as making contributions in the areas of astronomy and botany. Bacon popularised aeronautics through her writing, and promoted both commercial and popular flying as fields for women.

== Early life ==
Bacon was on 19 April 1874 in Cambridge to John Mackenzie Bacon, an astronomer, aviator and clergyman, and Gertrude Bacon (née Myers; 1849–1894). The second of three surviving children, Bacon had a younger half sister from her father's second marriage. In 1876, the family moved to Cold Ash, Berkshire. In 1880 her mother's mental health became poor following the birth of another child. Her father was an astronomer, aeronaut, and scientist who was a private tutor for University of Cambridge. He educated his children at home although Bacon also was briefly educated at The Maynard School, in Exeter.

She became her father's scientific collaborator in both astronomy and aeronautics. She was an original member of the British Astronomical Association (BAA) attending the inaugural meeting in 1890, and a member of the British Association for the Advancement of Science.

== Astronomy ==
She accompanied her father on BAA solar eclipse expeditions to observe total solar eclipses in Vadsø in Finnmark, Norway (9 August 1896), Buxar in India (22 January 1898), and Wadesboro, North Carolina (28 May 1900). Their first was unsuccessful, due to cloudy weather, but the second and third expeditions were successful. Bacon took photographs at all three events, including motion pictures at Buxar. Those from North Carolina were to measure if light diminished and returned at the same rate during an eclipse. In 1921 she was elected a fellow of the Royal Astronomical Society, following a proposal by the Astronomer Royal Frank Watson Dyson.

== Aeronautics ==
Aeronautics fascinated Bacon. She was the first woman in England to make a proper balloon ascent, in 1898, accompanied by her father. A more hair-raising balloon flight occurred on 15 November 1899, when John Mackenzie Bacon and Gertrude Bacon ascended with Stanley Spencer to observe the Leonid meteor shower from above the cloud layer. Ten hours later, they landed near Neath in South Wales, a narrow escape from drifting out over the Atlantic although she broke her arm.

In August 1904, she accompanied Stanley Spencer again, this time in an airship of his own design. As a result, she became one of the first women to fly in an airship. She joined the Aeronautical Society in 1905.

She is also credited as one of the first Englishwomen to fly in an airplane. Roger Sommer took her up in a Farman biplane on 29 August 1909, during the First International aviation gathering at Rheims, France. She also flew with Douglas Graham Gilmour in a 'Big Bat' monoplane in 1910.

Bacon was the first passenger in a seaplane. She accompanied pilot Herbert Stanley Adams in flights on Windermere in mid-1912. Adams had made the first successful complete flight from water and safely back again, in Britain, on 25 November 1911.

Bacon wrote several books about early aviation. She also gave public lectures, with opportunities becoming more numerous after her father's death in 1904. Initially she fulfilled his engagements but this enabled her to develop a reputation that secured future engagements. These became an important source of income.

== Botany ==
In 1901, Gertrude joined the Wild Flower Society, adding botany to her list of interests and achievements. Visiting Scotland on 23 July 1923, Gertrude Bacon and botanist and illustrator Lady Joanna Charlotte Davy (1865–1955) made the first discovery of Carex microglochin (bristle sedge) in Great Britain.

== Personal life ==
As well as following her interests in aeronautics, plants and astronomy, Bacon travelled in Britain and Europe. In her twenties, she cycled around Berkshire and Belgium. In 1900 she visited the Dolcoath copper and tin mine in Cornwall and saw the underground workings. She also visited the newly excavated tunnel of what became the underground Bakerloo Line in London in 1901.

In the early 1900s, Bacon lived with one of her brothers in Greenwich in London where he was an instructor in engineering at the Royal Naval College. During the First World War she was a Red Cross volunteer, working initially with post at Devonshire House in London but later in charge of this postal operation. She was also involved with the handover of prisoners of war in the Netherlands in December 1915 and she was later awarded the British war medal.

In 1929, Gertrude Bacon married a fellow botanist and chemist, Thomas Jackson Foggitt (2 March 1858 – 30 October 1934). She was his second wife. They initially live in Thirsk in Yorkshire. After her husband's death in 1934, she moved to join another brother, Frederick, who was the professor of engineering at University College, Swansea. They lived in the Swansea suburb of Sketty. After he died, she moved to Sway, Hampshire. She died on 22 December 1949.

== Publications ==
Bacon wrote several books and articles. They included:

- Balloons, airships and flying machines (1905)
- The record of an aeronaut, being the life of John M. Bacon (1907).
- How Men Fly (1911), London Cassell, with 13 photographs and 6 diagrams
- All about flying (1915)
- Memories of land and sky (1928), London: Methuen & Co. Ltd, with 15 photographs

In 1900, she wrote about her visit to the Dolcoath copper and tin mine in Cornwall in Good Words 41 pages 341–8.

Bacon also wrote a short story called "The Gorgon's Head", which appeared in December 1899 issue of The Strand Magazine.
