= Mellin's Food =

Defunct nutritional supplement and its maker

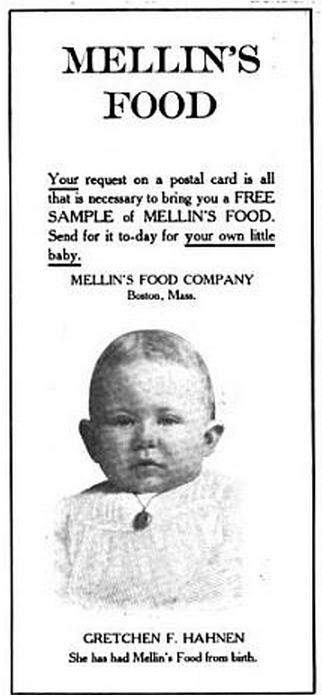

Mellin's Food Works was a maker of Mellin's Food for Infants and Invalids in London, England.

Mellin's Food Company (Doliber-Goodale Company) was a maker of Mellin's Food for Infants and Invalids in Boston, Massachusetts.

== History ==
The company started when the English food chemist Gustav Mellin developed an infant formula in 1866. Mellin's formula was a simplified version of one which had been recently invented by the German chemist Justus von Liebig. It wasn't a total nutritional supplement; the powder was diluted with cow's milk and water and was called a "milk modifier". It was a "soluble, dry extract of wheat, malted barley and bicarbonate of potassium." The formula was advertised with the slogan: "Mellin's Food for Infants and Invalids: The only perfect substitute for Mother's Milk".

The "Mellin's Airship" being flown by Stanley Spencer in 1902

In 1902, the Mellin Food Company sponsored the construction of the United Kingdom's first airship by Stanley Spencer. The completed airship carried an advertisement for Mellin's Food on its envelope. On 22 September 1902, Spencer flew the "Mellin's Airship" (officially named "Airship No 1") across London from Crystal Palace to Harrow.

Mellin's Food for infants and invalids was also made by The Doliber-Goodale Co., 41 Central Wharf, Boston, MA. It was sold in Australia.
