= Skyscaping =

Skyscaping is the arrangement of natural materials (landscaping) to spell words or form logos to be visible from the air.

Skyscaping differs from "googlescaping" in that the latter refers specifically to planning an image or words to be visible on future editions of Google Earth. Despite the technical differences, the terms are often used interchangeably.

This concept for this kind of vanity branding was created in ColoradoBiz magazine November 2011, but a company has been actually installing skyscaping since 2010.

Some homeowners are also skyscaping, by placing dark pavers that spell their last name in the pattern of their lighter colored driveway pavers, and some are planting shrubbery to spell out names. There are other ways to achieve the same result, by placing a flagstone path in grass in the pattern of a logo, etc.

Some companies with large black roofed warehouses have foam letters made to be placed on the roof.

== See also ==
- Atacama Giant
- Hill figure
- Nazca Lines
- Skywriting
