= Decorated Gothic =

Style of English Gothic architecture

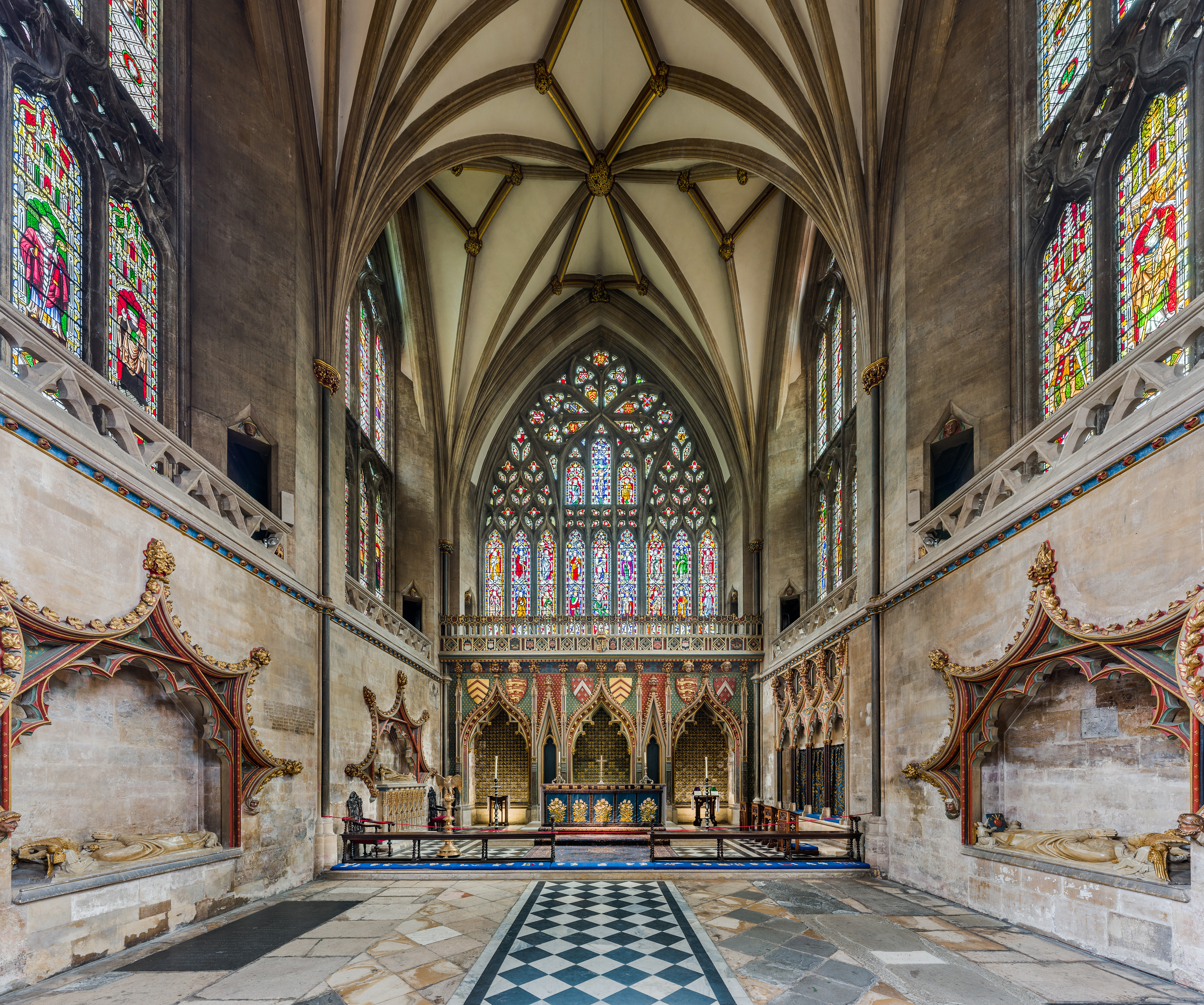
- The Lady Chapel of Bristol Cathedral
- Years active: c.1245-c.1360
- Location: Kingdom of England
- Major figures: Michael of Canterbury, Thomas of Canterbury, Walter of Hereford (mason), Thomas Witney, William Joy, William Ramsey, William Torell
- Influences: Early English Gothic, Rayonnant
- Influenced: Perpendicular Gothic, Flamboyant

Decorated Gothic (also Second Pointed, often abbreviated to Dec) was the second phase of English Gothic architecture, in vogue from the mid-13th to mid-14th centuries. It was distinguished by a unification of all arts to form one elaborate whole, with traceried windows, ornate surface decoration, complex geometry and intricate vaulting. The style saw the introduction of new architectural forms: especially the traceried window, but also the ogee arch, the lierne vault and 'bubbly' foliage carving. It is notable for using forms ornamentally rather than structurally. Decorated Gothic can be divided into two phases: Geometrical Decorated (pre-c.1290) and Curvilinear (or Flowing) Decorated (post-c.1290). While the Decorated was primarily an architectural style for churches, it also covered secular buildings, furnishings, sculpture and elements of applied arts like metalwork and manuscript illumination.

== History ==
=== Influences ===
==== Early English Gothic ====
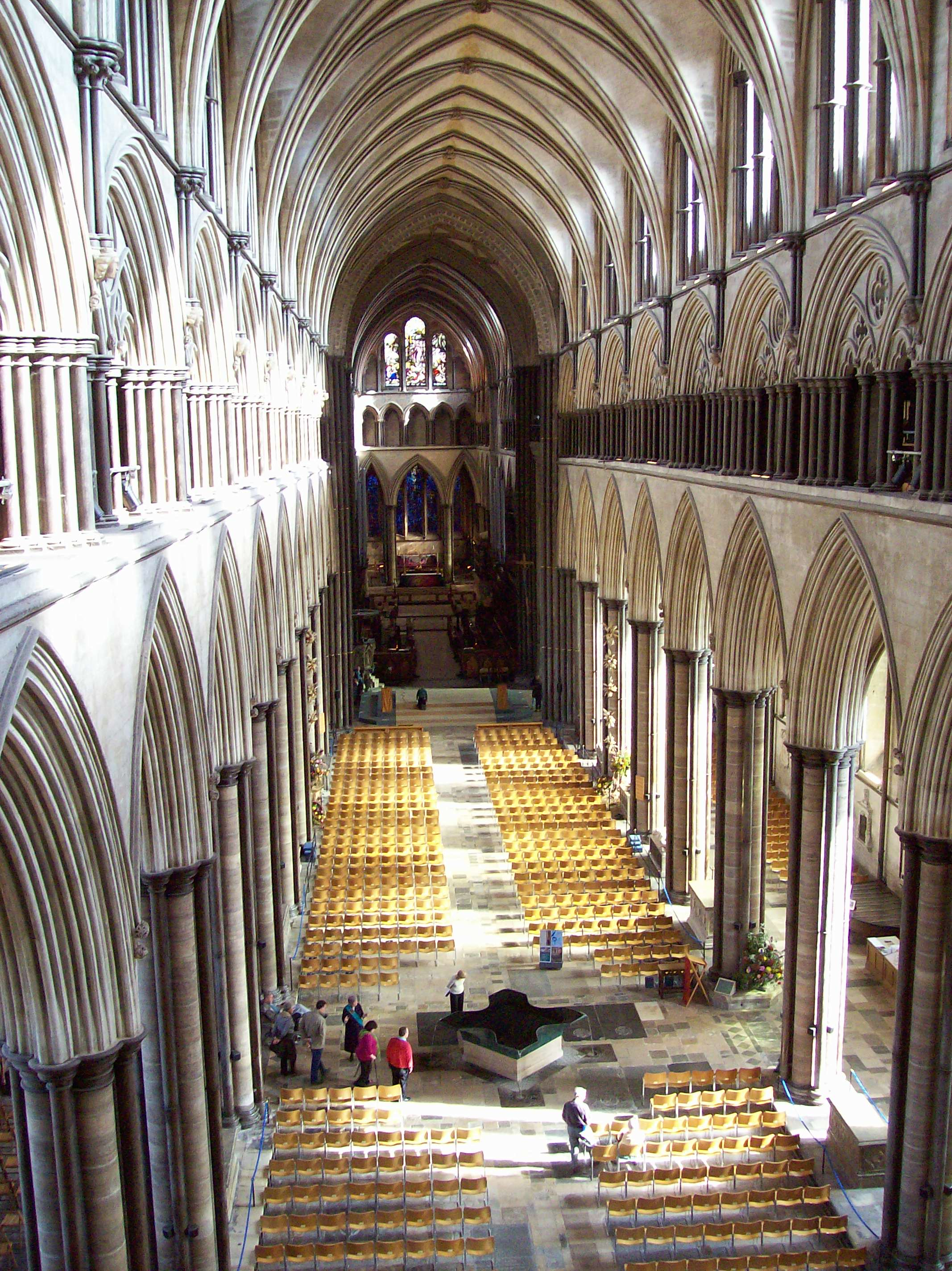
Salisbury Cathedral: while the arches are pointed, the walls are still thick, the gallery is high and the windows are narrow

Gothic architecture was introduced to England from France in the 1170s. However, English cathedral masons took it in a very different direction to France: rather than aiming to create a prodigiously high building, lit by large windows and supported by flying buttresses, they remained content with the low proportions and thick walls that had characterised Norman architecture, instead using the Gothic as a new form of surface enrichment. This could be seen even in the earliest English Gothic buildings, like Lincoln, where columns were surrounded by shafts of Purbeck marble, solid walls were cloaked in layers of blind arcading, and vaults, while low, were elaborated from the simple quadripartite type into tierceron forms, with additional decorative ribs.

==== Rayonnant ====
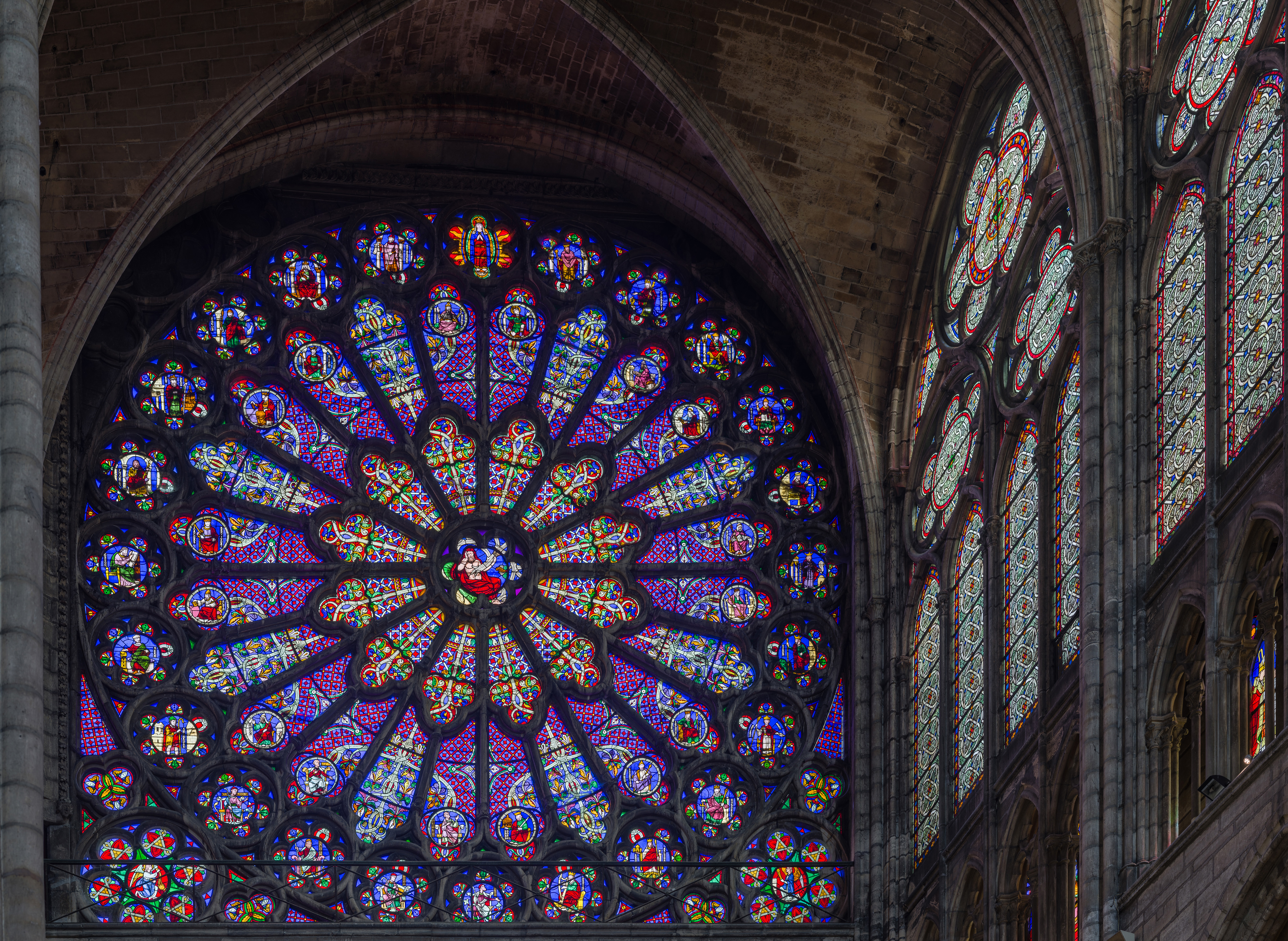
Saint-Denis Abbey: Rayonnant Gothic, with large traceried windows

Meanwhile, in France, Gothic architecture was evolving new forms. At Reims Cathedral, around 1215, bar tracery had been developed. This had radical structural implications, for it meant that windows were not limited in size by the iron ferramenta holding the glazing, but only by how much wall it was necessary to retain to support the vault. A new architectural style was developed, starting at the royal mausoleum of Saint-Denis in 1231, taking the window mullion of bar tracery as its basic unit, and virtually eliminating the stone wall; this is now termed the Rayonnant. As well as window tracery, a significant difference with English Gothic was the continuation of the vault supports down to the ground, rather than terminating them with corbels halfway up the wall as at Salisbury. This change unified the elevation, where previously it consisted of a stack of superimposed tiers, and increased the verticality of the interior. The new style was adopted at Louis IX's personal shrine of Sainte-Chapelle, consecrated in 1248, forming a jewel-like box glowing with stained glass.

=== Geometrical Decorated ===
==== Westminster Abbey ====
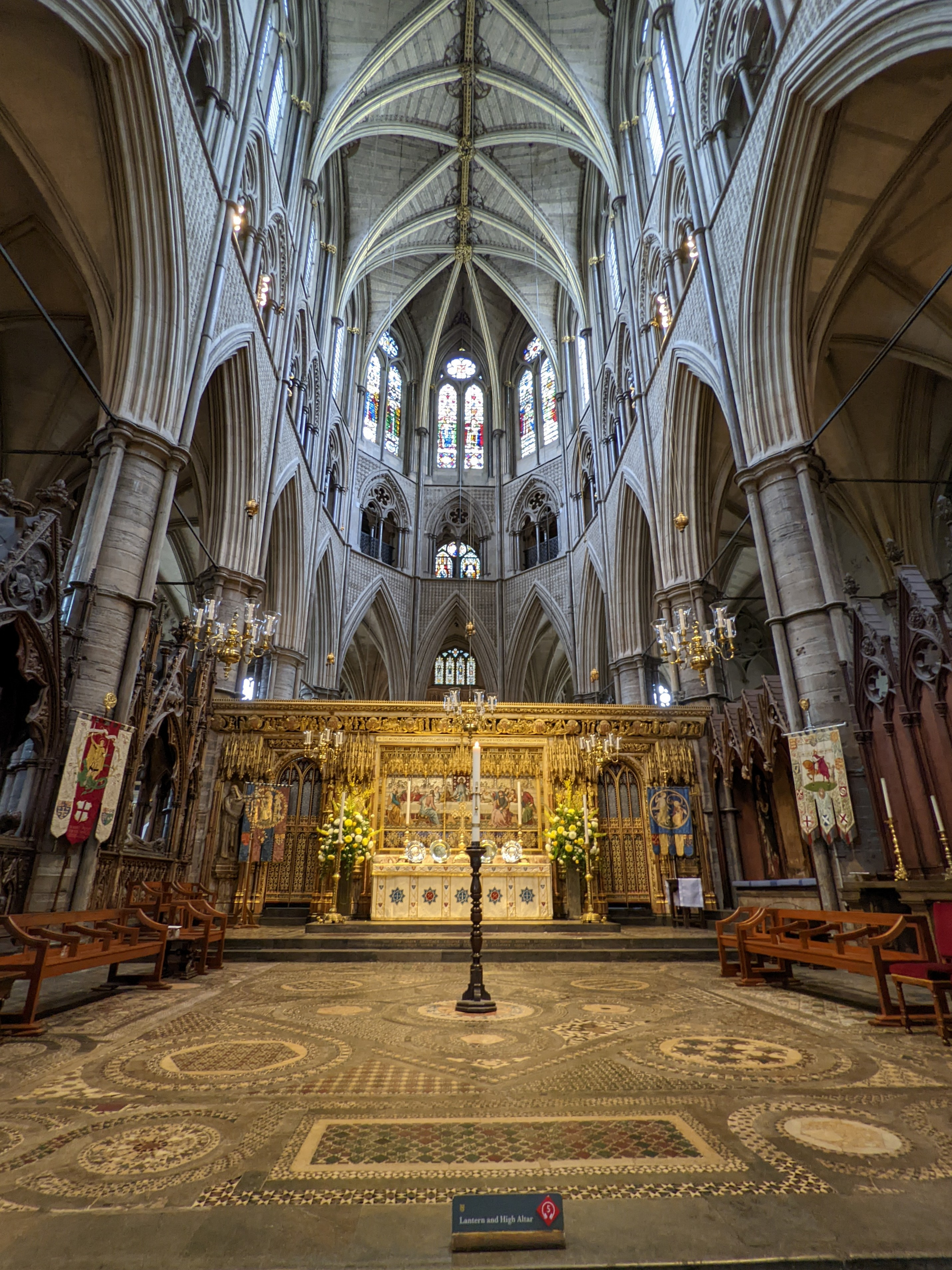
Westminster Abbey: an English interpretation of Rayonnant

In 1245, Henry III of England determined to rebuild the outdated abbey church of Westminster, to form a more suitable venue for coronations and a fitting location for the shrine of Edward the Confessor. He employed a French-trained (if not French) master mason, Henry of Reyns. The result was a curious combination of French High Gothic, Rayonnant and Early English. The plan of the chevet was based on Reims, the French coronation church, but with the long nave and transepts of an English cathedral like Salisbury. Likewise, the elevations combine the simple bar-traceried aisle windows, cyclindrical columns with attached shafts and quadripartite vault of the Classic Gothic, the rose windows and carved angels of the Rayonnant, and the high tribune gallery, Purbeck marble shafting and surface ornamentation of the English Gothic. Nicola Coldstream summarised the building as "very French in an English context, but not very convincing in a French one." The Rayonnant features appear to have been introduced by a new mason, Master Albericus. Buildings closely linked to Westminster also appeared at the cathedrals of Hereford (north transept, under the patronage of the Savoyard Peter of Aigueblanche) and Lichfield (nave). However, these ignored Westminster's French height, planning and pier forms.

==== Court Style in the mid-13th century ====
The choir of Old St Paul's, depicted by Wenceslaus Hollar.

The potential of bar tracery was gradually realised in works connected with the Court, particularly the choir of Old St Paul's (1250s, now only known from engravings) and the chapel of St Ethelreda in Ely Place. These used forms that were not part of orthodox French Gothic - the spherical triangle and Y-tracery. They also imported French forms from more up-to-date sources than Reims and the Sainte-Chapelle, such as the new transept ends of Notre Dame in Paris. The existence of an English 'Court' style has, however, been questioned by some historians, such as Nicola Coldstream, as at this time the king was still peripatetic, hindering masons and other artists from settling near royal projects.

==== Wider adoption ====
The key motif of bar tracery soon spread across England (at this time including southern Wales), providing an opportunity to make churches lighter and to display the developing art of stained glass. A major early example was the Angel Choir at the east end of Lincoln Cathedral, with vast and rich bar-traceried windows creating a textured mass, as the thick walls and low proportions were continued from the Early English work. The clustered columns were also based on the Early English, though the forms were broader than a truly Early English building like Wells. Another important building was the cloister and chapter house of Salisbury (c.1280), virtually copied from Westminster.

A major elevational change was the elimination of the gallery. This had been a prominent feature of greater English churches since Norman times, and was even used at Westminster, but these high, dark arches were seen as unsuited to the new aesthetic. In future (where not constrained by existing work), elevations would either be two-storeyed, as was already the norm for Cistercian abbey churches like Sweetheart and Tintern, or, where something grander was desired, they would have a thin triforium band in the French manner. At Exeter, the masons' thought process can be seen, as the presbytery was initially built with two storeys. This seems to have been unsatisfactory, for the slightly later choir was given a triforium, and then the already-built presbytery was remodelled to take a 'false' triforium, without a wall passage. York became a surprising centre of Rayonnant orthodoxy, with its nave (begun in 1291) having the thin walls, linked triforium and clerestory, floor-to-ceiling vaulting shafts and drawn linearity of the French style. However, by the time the York nave was begun, the first monuments of the Curvilinear were already under construction.

=== Curvilinear Decorated ===
==== The Eleanor Crosses ====
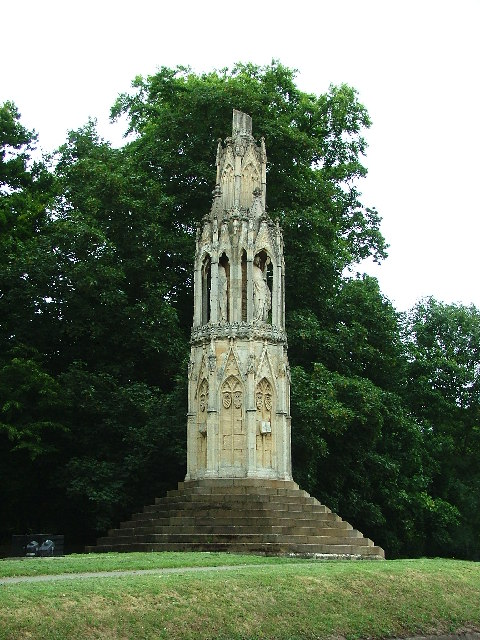
Hardingstone Eleanor Cross: early use of split cusps, ogees and micro-architecture

In 1290, Eleanor of Castile, queen of Edward I, died in Nottinghamshire. To commemorate her, Edward commissioned crosses to be erected at each point where her body rested on its journey to London. Of these, those at Geddington, Hardingstone and Waltham Cross survive. These elaborately-sculpted monuments are densely coated in niches of exotic form, a concept termed micro-architecture. In addition, they used complex plan geometry, being based on hexagons and triangles. Another feature was the split, or Kentish, cusp, which broke the order of Geometrical tracery, leading to flowing tracery. The earliest example of the split cusp appears to be the arch-and-gable tomb of Bishop John de Bradfield (d.1283) at Rochester Cathedral. These new tracery forms started to subtly disrupt the logical patterns of arches and circles, before abandoning them altogether in favour of rippling concoctions of mouchettes and daggers.

==== St Stephen's Chapel ====
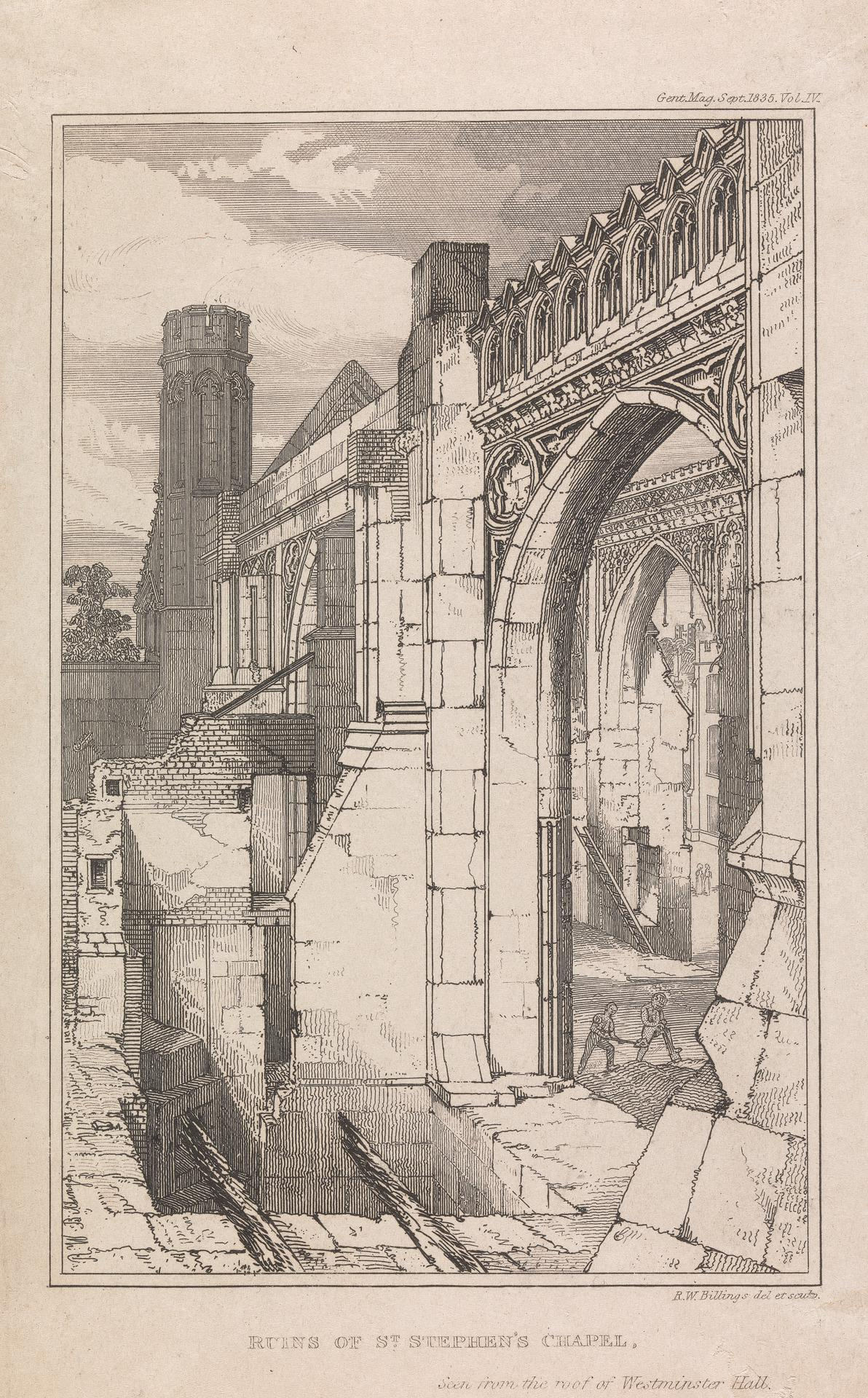
St Stephen's Chapel, after the fire of 1834

These features were also seen at the much-delayed royal chapel of St Stephen in Westminster Palace (begun in 1292), intended to be an English answer to Sainte-Chapelle. As well as royal patronage, a link between the two is the master mason Michael of Canterbury, who designed the Cheapside cross. Like that building, it stood above a lower chapel, but it differed in its use of ornament with ogee arches and split cusps, in its flat east end, and especially in its clerestory under the vault. The window mullions were carried down over the façade in an unusual manner that was not taken up again until the 1330s, when construction of the chapel resumed.

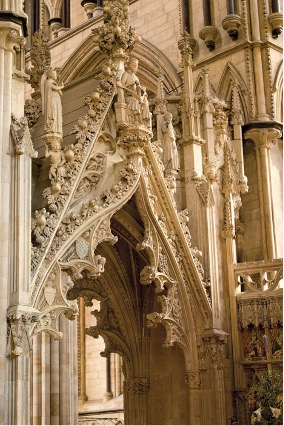
Nodding ogee over the so-called Percy Tomb, Beverley Minster

==== Wider adoption ====
By the early 14th century, the Curvilinear style was in general use across cathedral architecture, from Carlisle to Canterbury. Its gradual adoption can be seen in the nave at Exeter, where the traceries get freer towards the west of the building. The Curvilinear style was especially prominent along the east coast, where elaborate regional schools of tracery can be found around Canterbury and Norwich as well as in Lincolnshire, and around Bristol, where there was bold experimentation with polygonal plans and flying vaults, as well as a preference for ballflower ornamentation. The south-west also saw the use of the 'Berkeley arch', a Persian-inspired polygonal form with radiating inverted arches that was used at Bristol Cathedral (then still an abbey), St Mary Redcliffe and Berkeley Castle.

A slightly later development (c.1310) was the 'nodding' ogee, in which the arch leans forwards, entirely divorced from structural concerns, as at Ely Cathedral's Lady Chapel. The Ely works exemplified the unification of the arts in the later Decorated, with a variety of techniques being combined to form an elaborate interior. Another example is at the north-east window of Dorchester Abbey, where the Tree of Jesse is depicted in stained glass and stone sculpture, and the message uniquely reinforced by the branching forms of the underlying window tracery. As a whole, the style was one of illusions, made possible by the coating of all structural materials with paint and gilding, so that the timber vaults over the Octagon at Ely appear to be stone (a structural impossibility) and the sculpted angelic musicians at Exeter appeared to make music (due to a concealed gallery for real musicians behind). Things not being what they seemed reinforced the sense of religious mystery and wonder, preparing the worshipper for the mystery of the sacrament.

Unlike the Geometrical, the Curvilinear was seldom used in Scotland, seemingly due to the Wars of Independence after 1296. The wars both halted major building activity in the early 14th century, and made Scottish patrons reluctant to copy English architecture. However, an exception is the refectory of Dunfermline Abbey (c.1329), patronised by the Bruce dynasty and featuring an elaborate reticulated window in the surviving gable end.

=== Replacement by Perpendicular ===
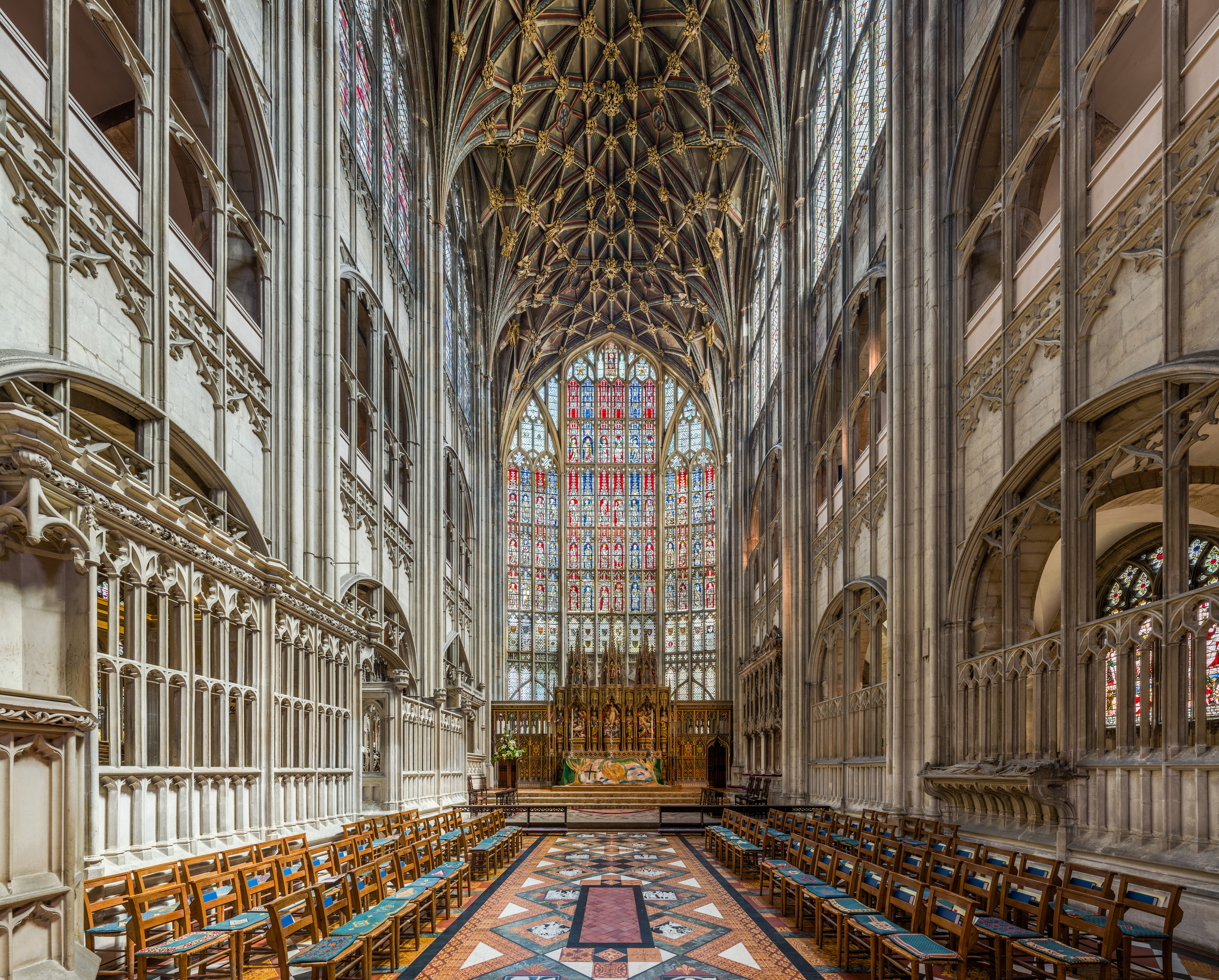
The quire of Gloucester Cathedral: the earliest surviving Perpendicular building

Around the year 1330, designers began to look again at the possibilities presented by St Stephen's Chapel, and in particular by the descending window mullions dissolving the walls of the lower chapel. These were used at the chapter house of Old St Paul's (1332, by William Ramsey, destroyed after the Great Fire of 1666) and the south transept of Gloucester (1331, now the cathedral), to make the walls disappear behind a stone scaffolding. This new form of architecture, now known as Perpendicular Gothic, was more austere and standardised than the Decorated, taking the arched panel as its basic unit just as the Rayonnant had the window mullion. While the consistent application of the descending mullion and the panel were new, both work occasional features of Decorated works like the lantern at Ely, and the first Perpendicular projects may be considered as another line of Decorated experimentation, which only later crystallised into a new style. Although the influence of the style was initially limited, the combined effects of royal patronage and the death of much of the workforce in the Black Death meant that it was well-established by the mid-14th century. Nonetheless, the Decorated style continued in use at least into the 1360s, partly due to ongoing cathedral projects like the Carlisle choir, the Ely lady chapel and the York nave. Some buildings, like Edington Priory, combined Decorated and Perpendicular features, sitting between the styles. The Perpendicular style was not fully adopted until three major projects of the 1360s and '70s - the naves of Canterbury and Winchester and the east end of York - established it as the accepted style for church buildings. These were the first major new church projects after the Black Death.

Ironically, when the Decorated was falling out of fashion in England, the movement was taken up in France, with the potential of ogees and the defiance of structural logic being taken still further in the Flamboyant style.

== Features ==
=== Window tracery ===
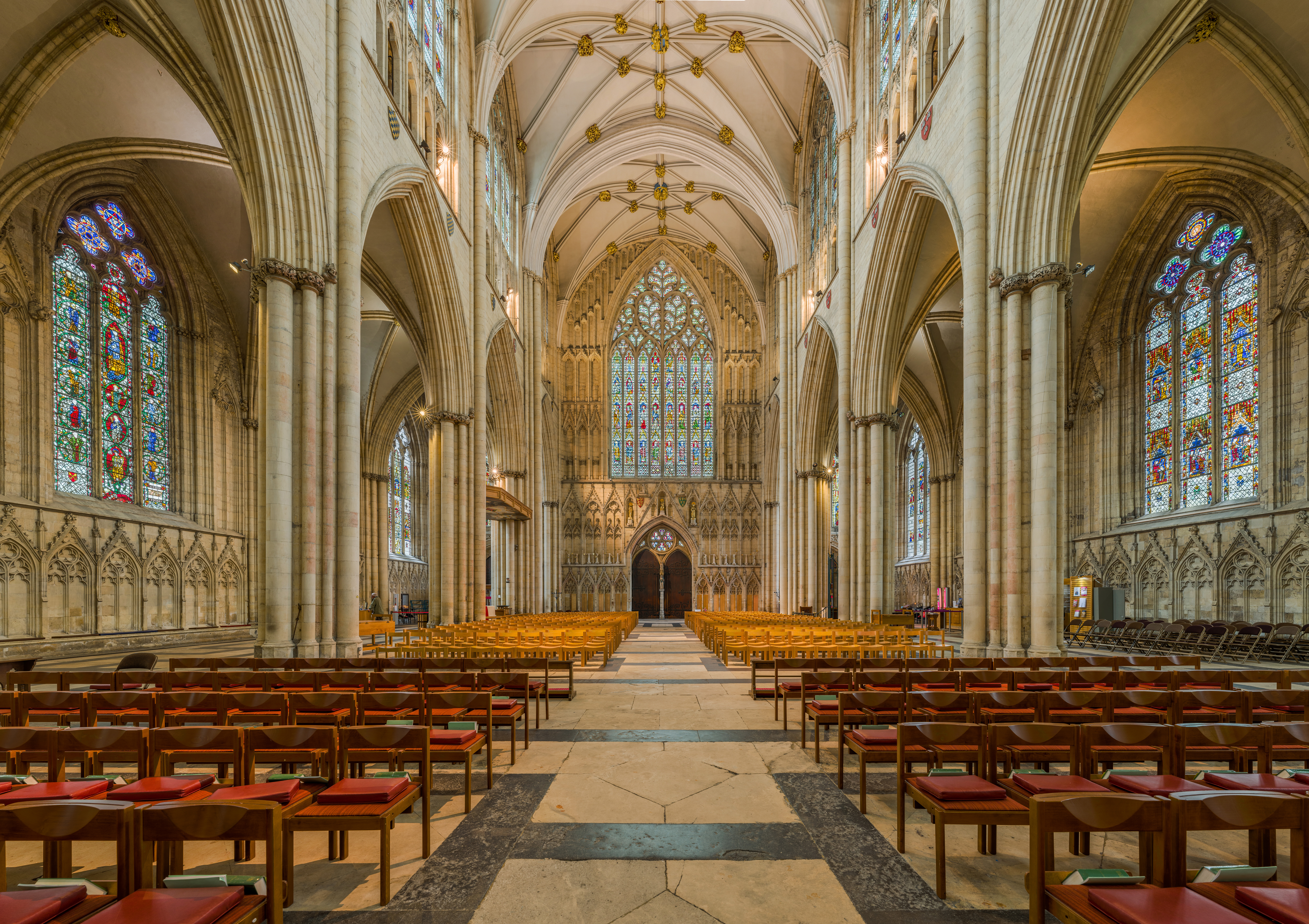
The belated Rayonnant nave of York Minster, with its flowing west window

Windows were seen by the Victorians as the defining features of the Gothic styles, and they were, inasmuch as they determined the methods of wall construction. Though Westminster Abbey is generally considered to be the first English building to use bar tracery (after 1245), documentary evidence suggests that the west front of Binham Priory may have had it before 1244 (though this is disputed), while the great tower of Chepstow Castle received bar tracery c.1228. Early bar tracery consisted of dividing the arch into sub-arches, with foiled circles above, provided that the window had an even number of lights. When a window had three lights, as at Old St Paul's and Lincoln, three circles formed the tracery, disrupting the system of sub-arches. An early variant was Y-tracery, in which the sub-arches were steeper and the circle was omitted. When extended across a larger window, this became intersecting tracery. These were the forms of Geometrical Decorated. In the flowing tracery of the Curvilinear style, the arches and circles were gradually replaced by forms derived from the ogee. An early type was fishnet tracery, seen at Wells, which evolved into reticulated tracery. In both these types, a single unit is repeated across the window. However, there were many more elaborate forms of flowing tracery. These often had an underlying geometry of major subdivisions, concealed by many flickering minor subdivisions. Notable flowing windows include the west window of York (the so-called Heart of Yorkshire), the east window of Carlisle and the east window of Selby Abbey. Lincolnshire was a major centre of flowing tracery due to its good-quality, easily-worked limestone. However, tracery in Kent remained closer to its Geometrical origins, making less use of the ogee and more of elaborate cusping. Occasionally, tracery could extend across the whole window, as at Clevedon Court and Dorchester Abbey (the latter with integrated sculpture).

Forms of Decorated window tracery

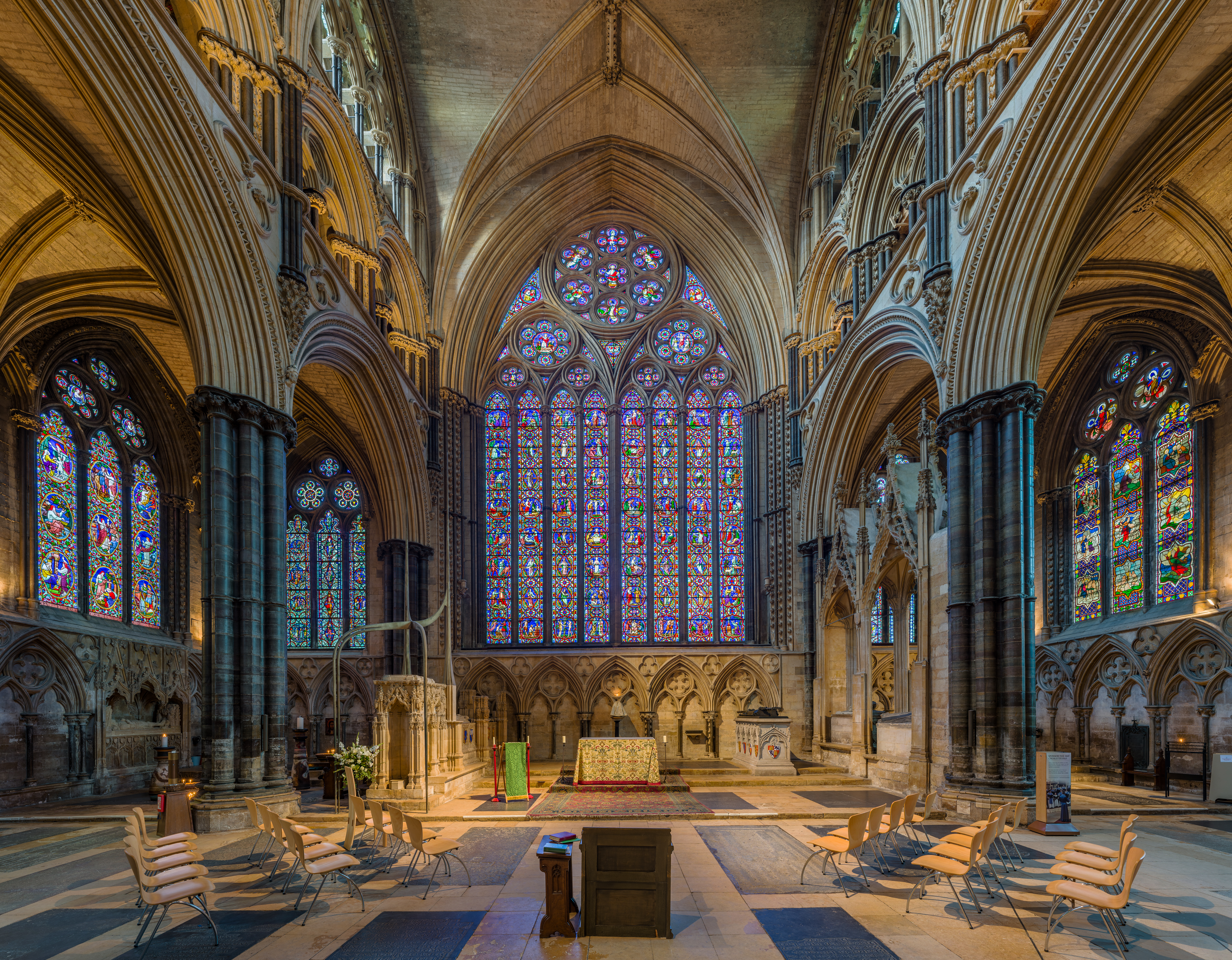
Geometrical windows in the Angel Choir at Lincoln

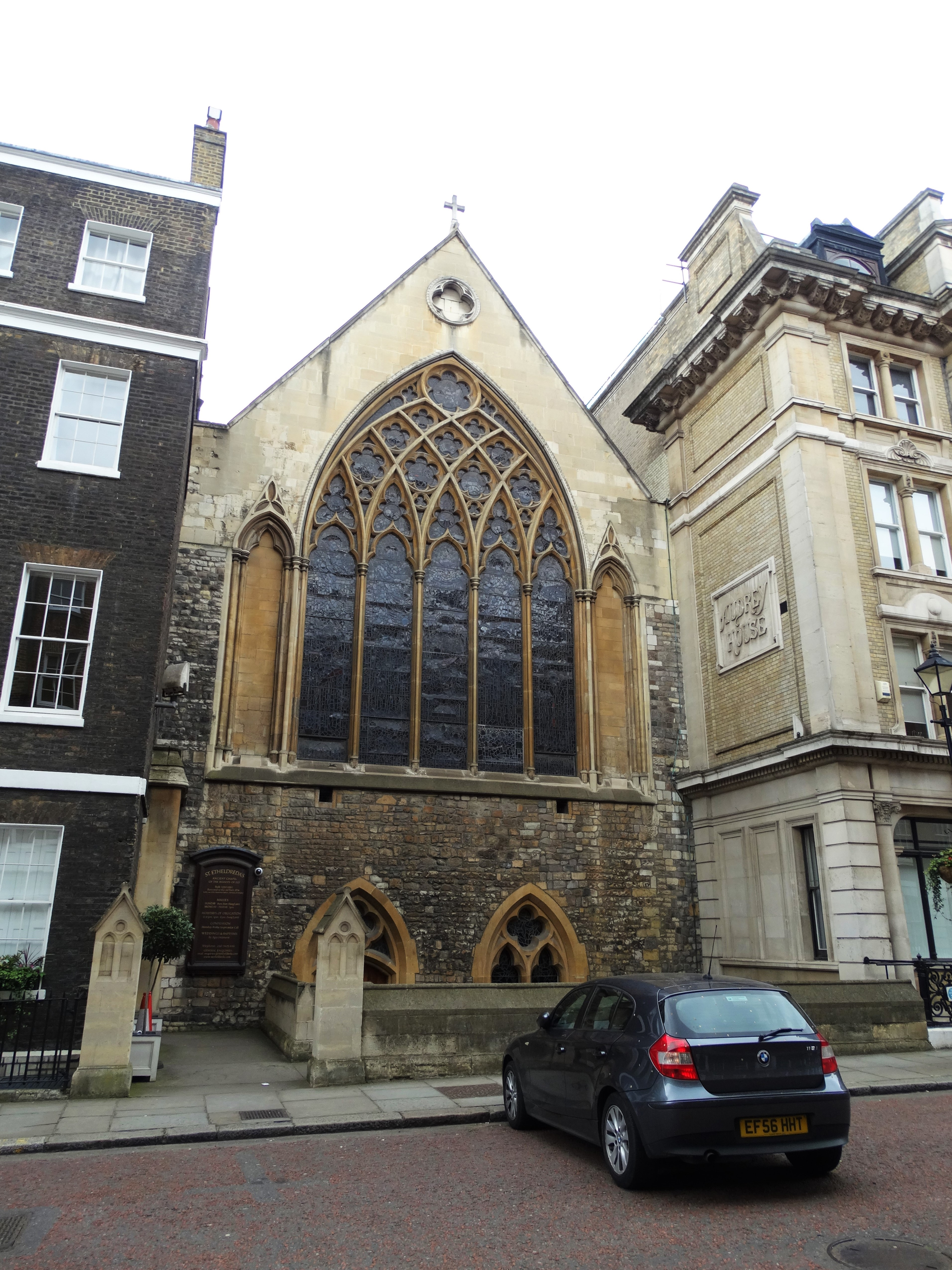
Intersecting tracery at St Ethelreda, Ely Place.

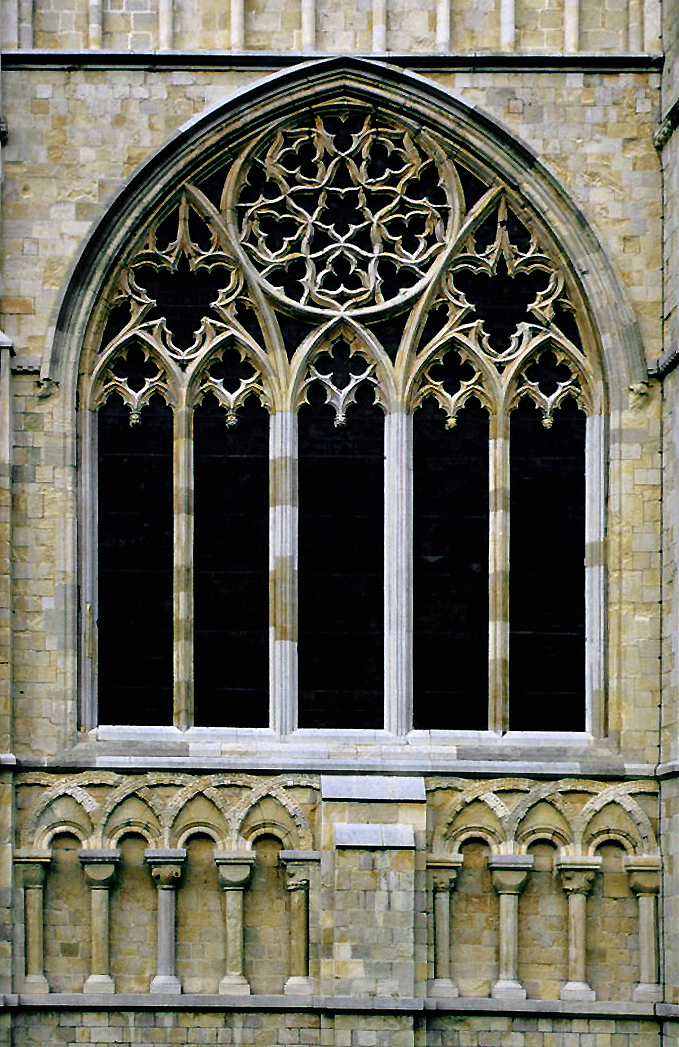
Elaborate Kentish tracery in the Oxenden window, Canterbury Cathedral

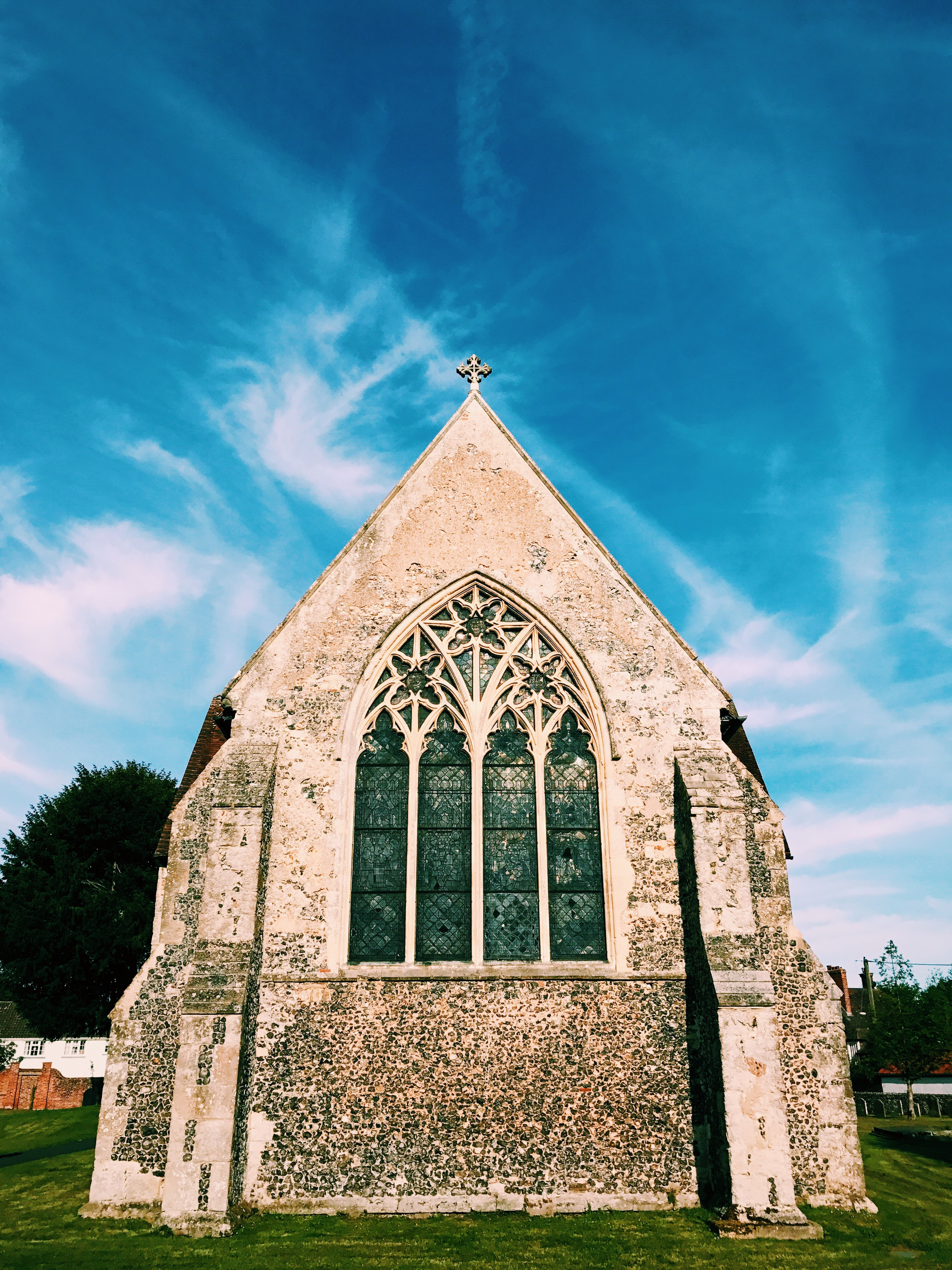
'Kentish' tracery, St Mary's Church, Chartham

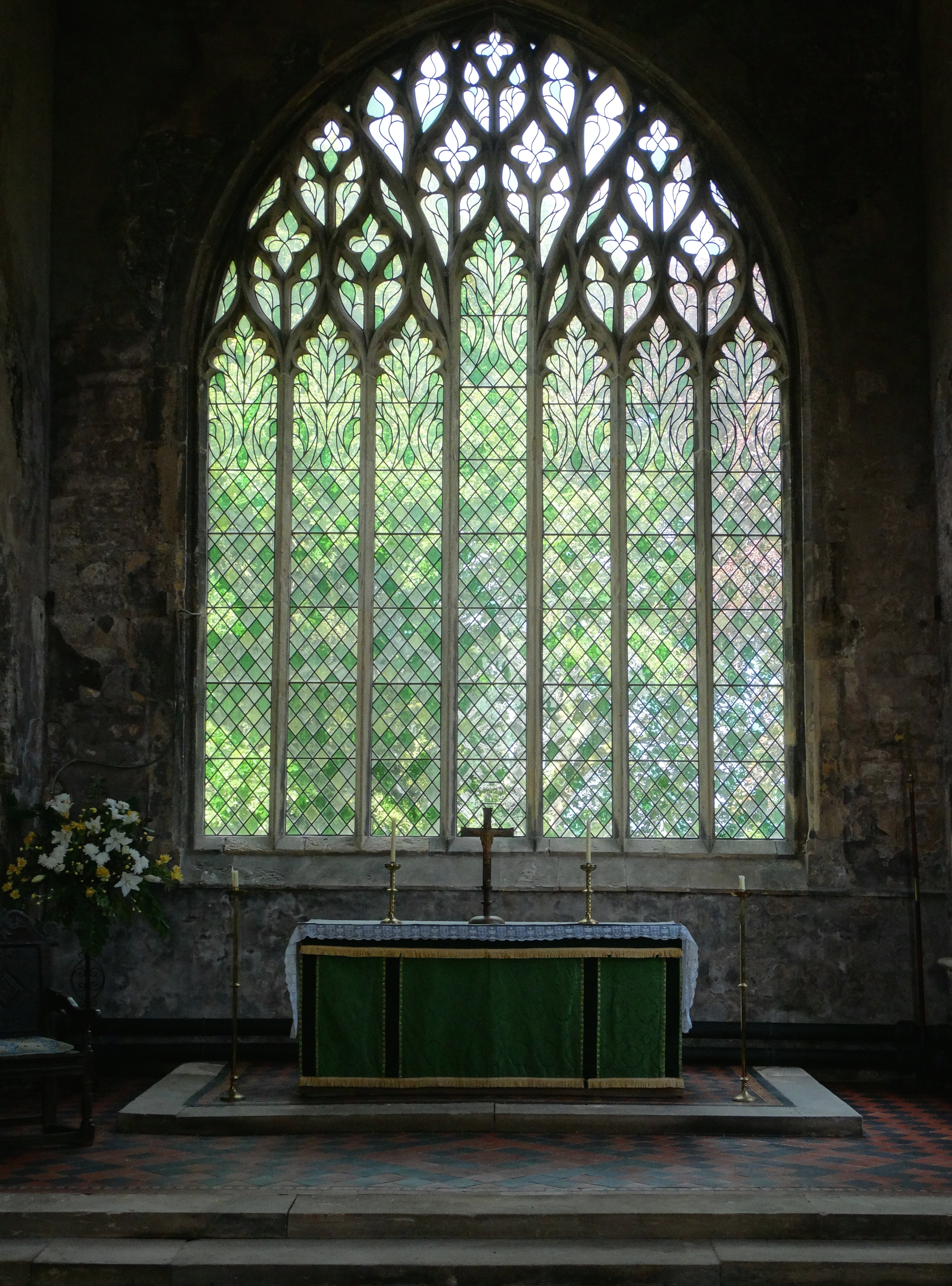
A variant of reticulated tracery, Fishlake, South Yorkshire

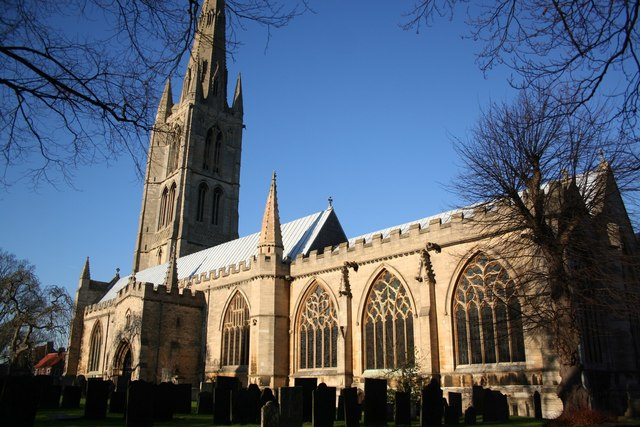
Flowing tracery, St Wulfram's, Grantham

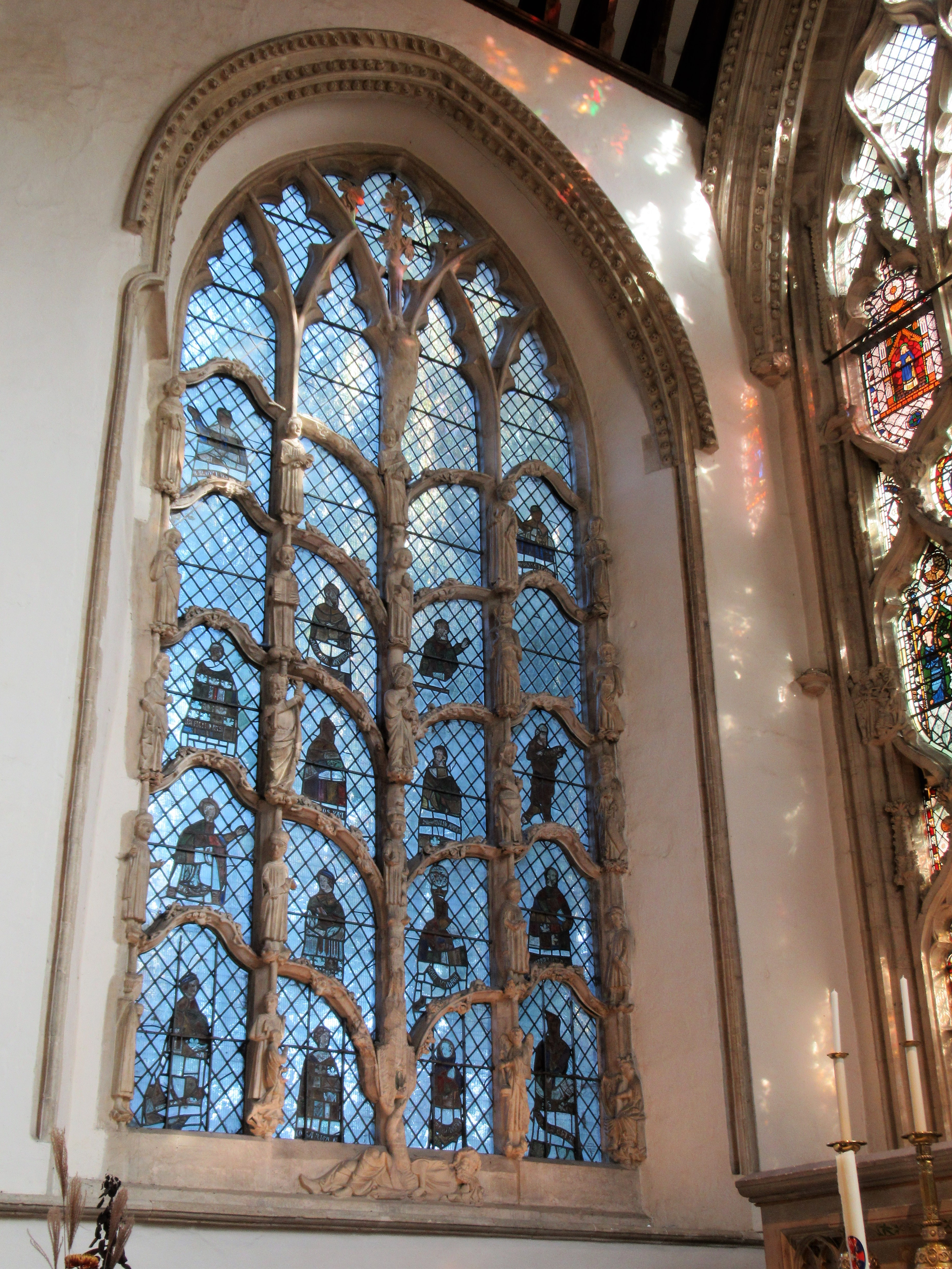
The Jesse window at Dorchester Abbey

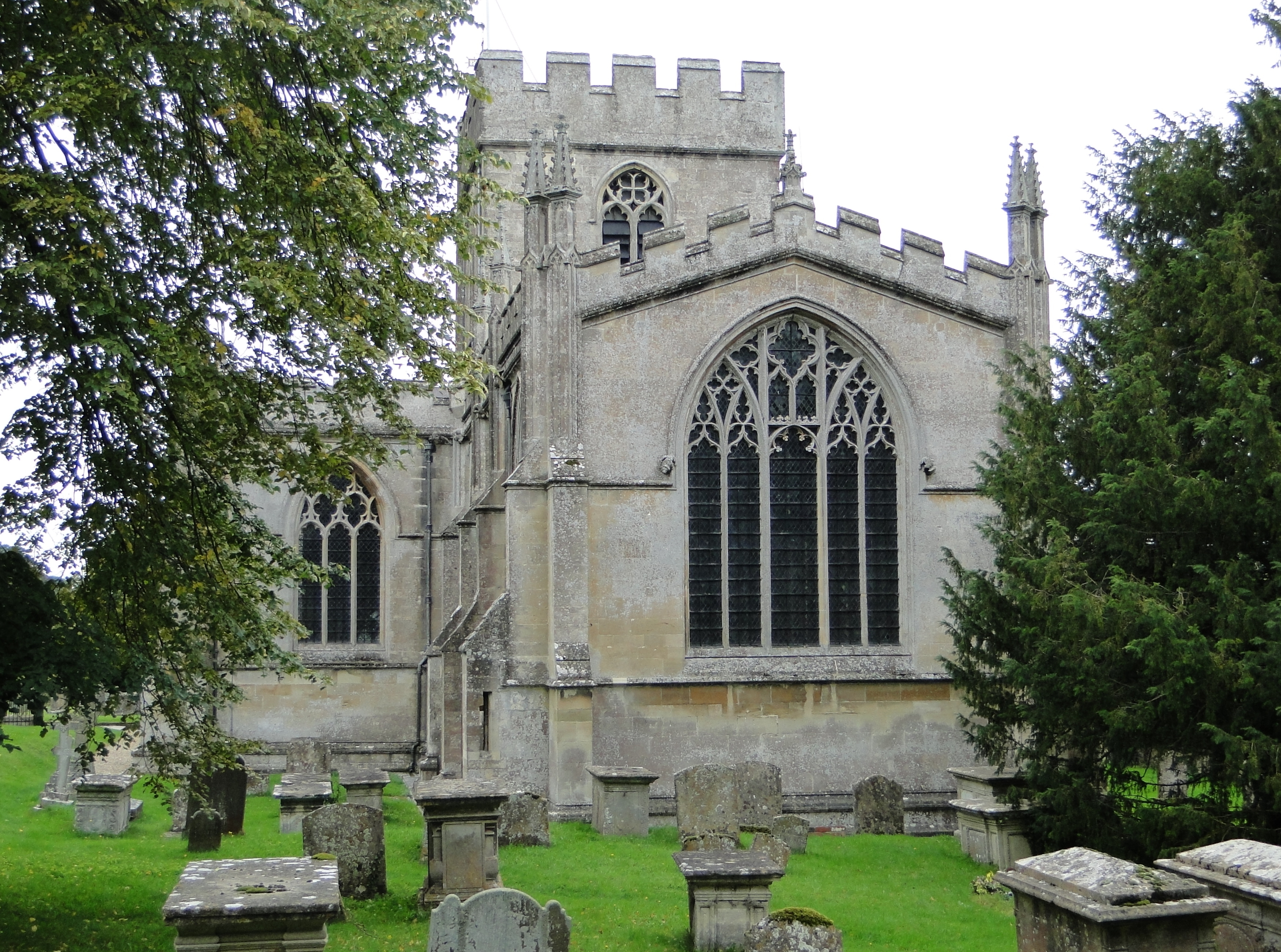
Transitional Decorated-Perpendicular tracery, Edington Priory, Wiltshire

=== Vaults ===
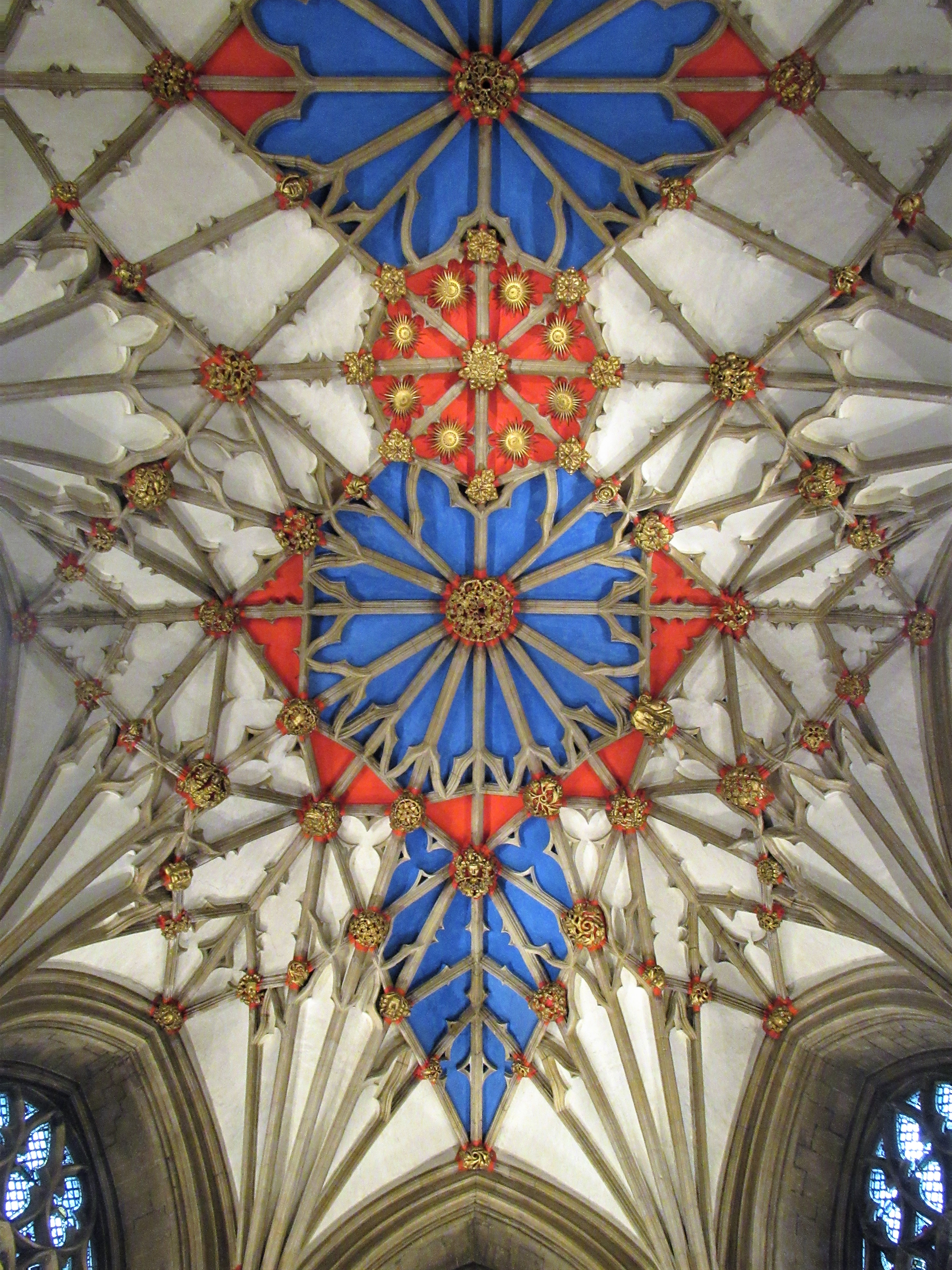
Lierne vault at Tewkesbury Abbey

Unlike in French Gothic, vaults were one of the principal locations for ornament. The tierceron vault, with additional decorative ribs rising from the springing to the ridge, had been developed at Lincoln in the Early English period, but became the general cathedral form in Geometrical buildings, most notably Exeter Cathedral. One variant of the tierceron is the palm vault, where the ribs radiate from a central column, as at the chapter house of Wells.

The introduction of the lierne vault, with minor ribs linking the main ones, was one of the features that began the Curvilinear, derived like so many others from St Stephen's Chapel, though it seems to have been invented in the West, with the earliest surviving example being at Pershore Abbey (c.1288). It gave masons an opportunity to play with geometry, creating patterns of stars, diamonds and octagons. The West Country also favoured the net vault, in which liernes were applied over a tunnel vault. Examples can be seen at Tewkesbury Abbey (nave) and Wells Cathedral (east end), and it persisted into the Perpendicular age at Gloucester (choir) and Winchester (nave). Wells also has an odd form of net vault set over the octagonal lady chapel to create a dome.

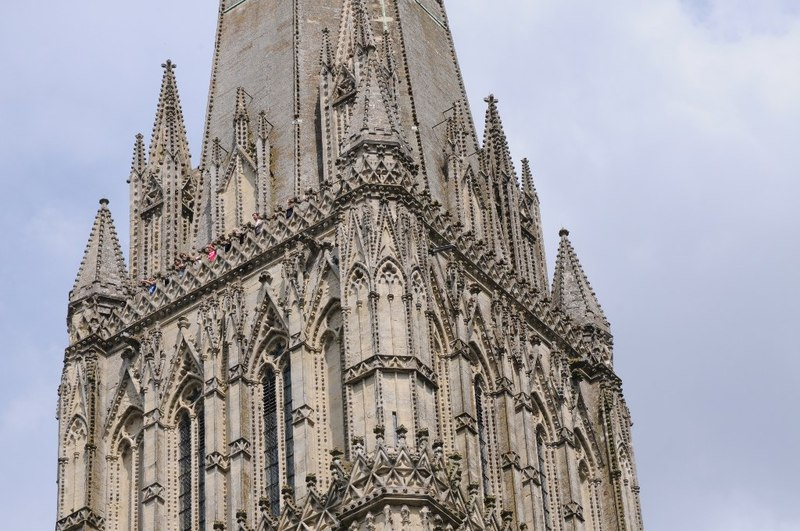
Detail of the tower and recessed spire at Salisbury Cathedral, showing the ballflower ornamentation and pinnacles

=== Towers and spires ===
In this period, church towers were always topped with spires - where this is not the case, as at Lincoln, it is because they have been later removed. Tower buttresses took a variety of forms, but the most typical type was the angle buttress, rising to polygonal pinnacles. Hexagonal pinnacles were briefly in fashion in the 1330s, e.g. at Grantham, but the usual form was octagonal. Spires could be over either broach form, oversailing the tower, or recessed form, set behind the parapet. In contrast to the soaring towers, the buildings themselves tended to look boxier, with low-pitched lead roofs hidden behind battlements, like the eastern chapels of Exeter.

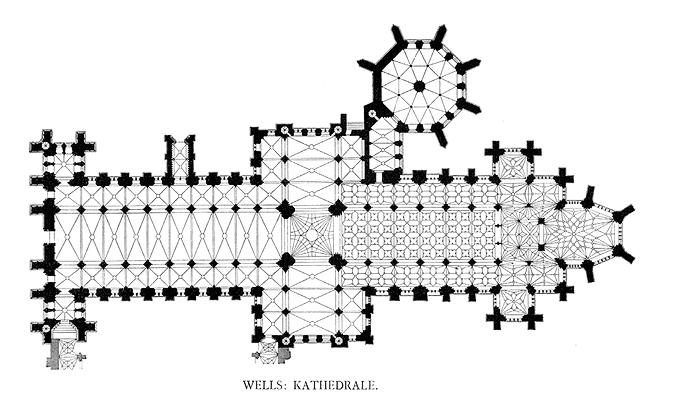
Plan of Wells Cathedral, showing the polygonal layouts and complex vaults of the Decorated portions (to the right).

=== Plan forms ===
In general, churches followed the plan forms of the Early English period, with long naves and transepts, tall crossing towers and squared-off east ends. This is unsurprising, as few major churches were built from scratch. However, there were significant experiments with polygonal forms. Octagonal chapter houses had long been fashionable for secular cathedrals, and this was continued at York, Southwell and Wells. Wells took the polygonal fascination to new lengths, with a stretched octagonal Lady Chapel requiring odd triangular vaulted spaces to connect it to the main church. Ely brought the octagon into the church itself, removing the entire collapsed Norman crossing to open up the centre of the building with a vast stone and timber lantern. A parallel development was a minor fashion for hexagonal porches, at Ludlow, St Mary Redcliffe and Chipping Norton.

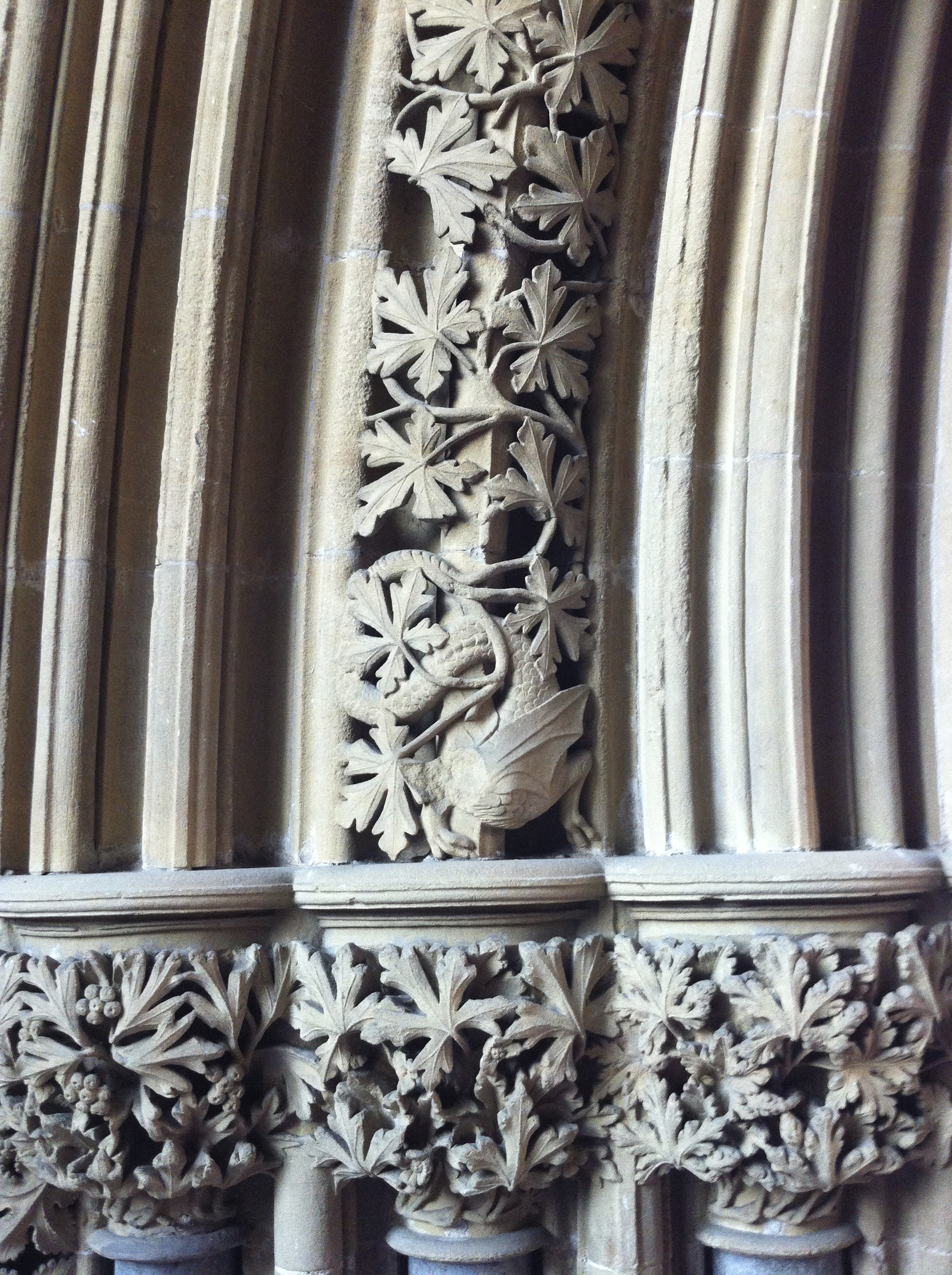
Naturalistic sculpture, Southwell Cathedral

=== Sculpture ===
The Geometrical period saw the introduction of naturalistic foliage sculpture, of which the finest is at Southwell, replacing the earlier stiff-leaf. This was in turn replaced by a more standardised and stylised 'bubbly', 'knobbly' or 'seaweed' foliage in Curvilinear Decorated, producing the hazy, all-over rippling seen in the buildings as a whole. Occasionally, the 'architectural' lines of the building could appear to dissolve into the foliage, as in the Eastry screens of Canterbury Cathedral (c.1298). More standardised ornamentation was also used, with ballflower being popular in the south-west, and fleurons (square flowers) dominating later on.

In addition, figure sculpture became less formal, as may be seen by comparing the kings on the west fronts of Lincoln and Exeter Cathedrals with the saints on that of Wells. The Wells saints stand rigid, whereas the kings sit cross-legged, and appear to talk animatedly to each other across their niches. As in arches, so in figure the S-shaped curve was popular, with people in sculpture, stained glass and manuscript illuminations swaying elegantly. External figure sculpture as a whole became more widespread, with grotesques of monsters and mooning men atop churches, and carved fighting men hurling rocks crowning castles (e.g. at Alnwick).

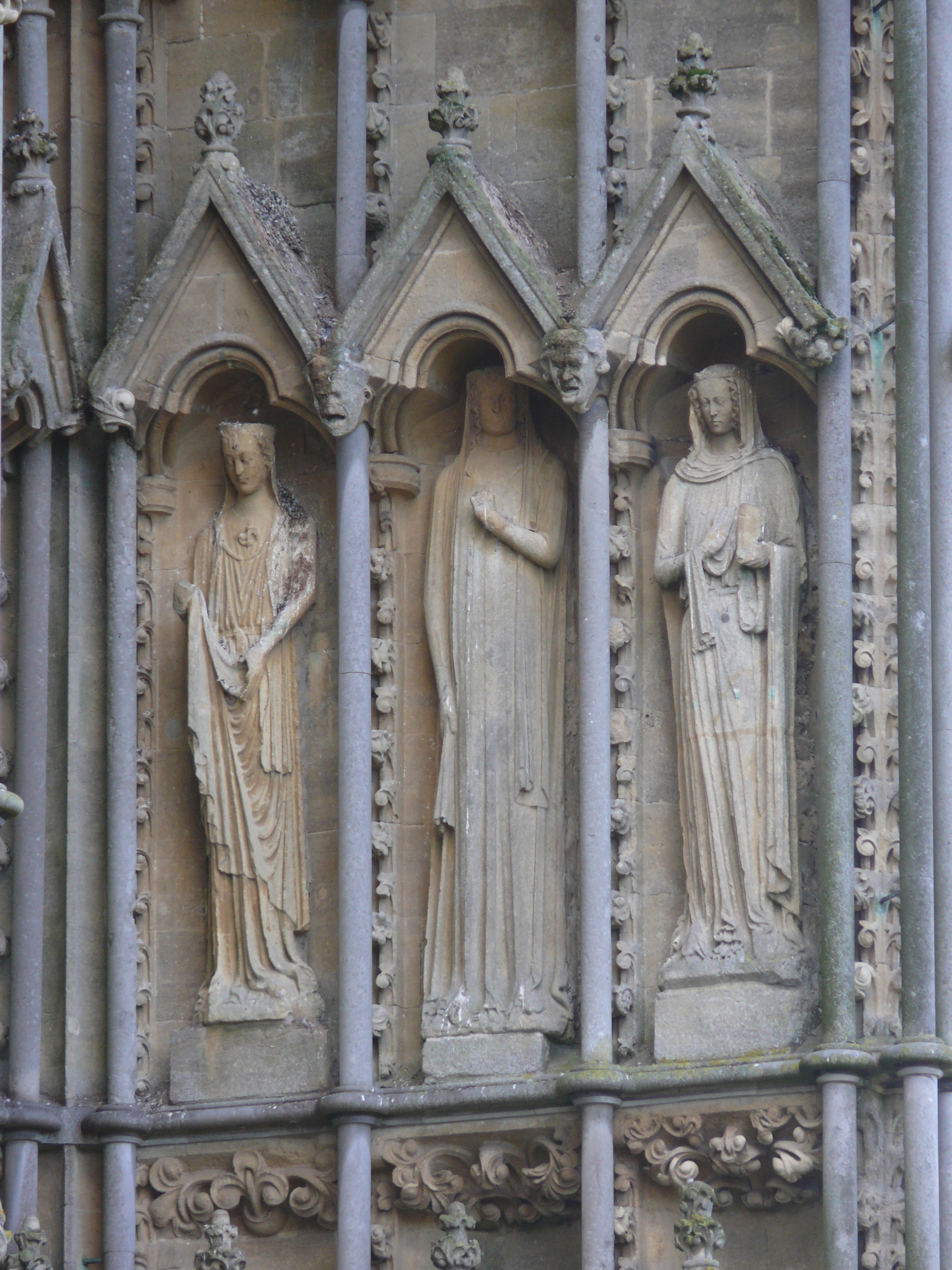
Rigid Early English statuary at Wells Cathedral

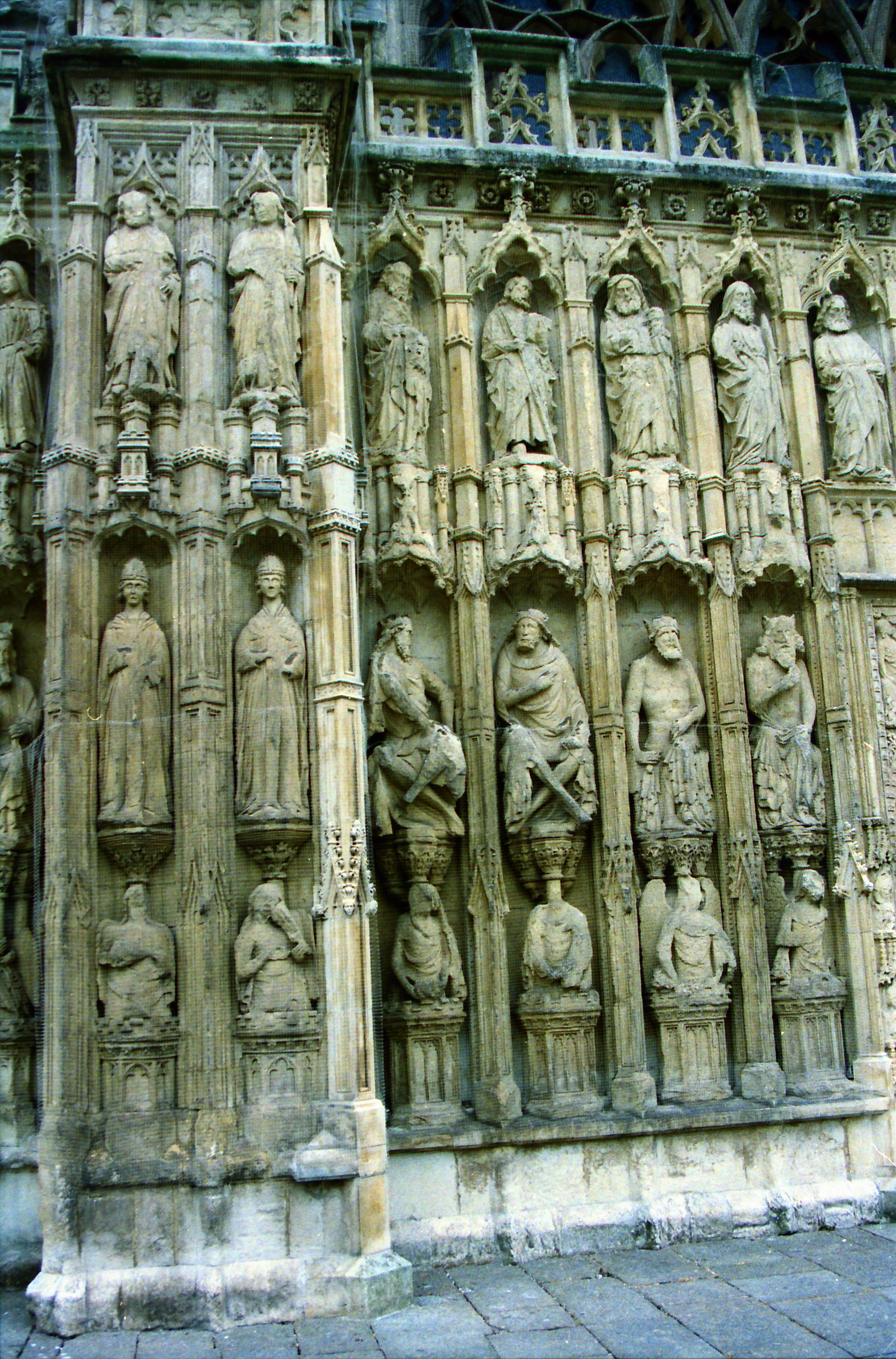
Animated Decorated statuary at Exeter Cathedral

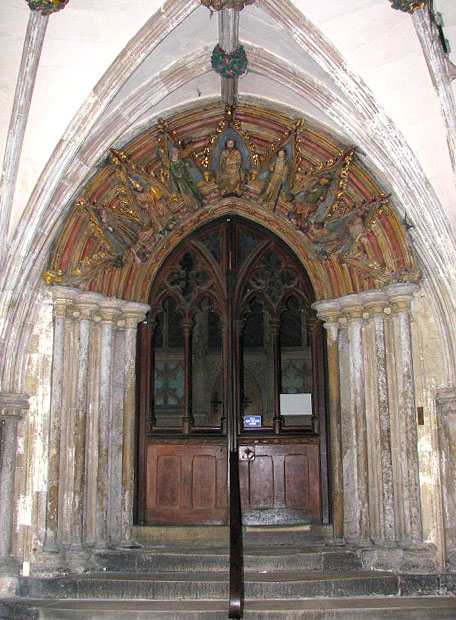
Swaying figures obscuring the architecture at Norwich Cathedral

=== Mouldings ===
The crisp, deeply-undercut, linear mouldings of the Early English were replaced by broader ogee and wave mouldings, in both religious and secular architecture, to give a smooth, rippling effect, especially in the Curvilinear period. In column profiles, 'keeled' points were replaced by flat 'fillets', with the same result.

=== Micro-architecture ===
The features of Decorated, and especially Curvilinear, could be used at any scale. At this time, it was believed that the cosmos could be embodied in microcosm, and could be represented by a simple, easily identifiable feature, such as the lily and rose signifying the garden, and hence Eden, Adam and Eve and the Virgin Mary. Hence, where a building could have tracery, vaults and pinnacles, the canopy of a pinnacle could also have tracery, niches and pinnacles. This fractal nature gave the Curvilinear much of its luxuriousness. Micro-architecture also unified the arts to a greater degree than before, so that architectural details could be seen not just on a church, but also on its screens, stalls, tombs and reliquaries. An early example was at Westminster, where the chapter house tiles copied the great transeptal rose windows in miniature. At Old St Paul's, the shrine of St Erkenwald had pinnacles and buttresses resembling those of the contemporary eastern limb of the church. Most surviving shrine bases date from this period, and have decoration linked to contemporary metalwork. Battlements were another feature that could be used at any scale, and on any type of building, reflecting the feudal enthusiasm of the age. Micro-architecture was frequently used on tombs and chantry chapels, which were an increasingly prominent feature of churches. The epitome of micro-architecture was the gable-over-arch motif, derived from reliquaries and therefore having sacred connotations. It could be used at all scales, whether that of a cathedral (like the west front of York Minster) or that of a niche for a single image. This feature, repeated endlessly, could act as a cipher for the church as a whole.

The arch-and-gable motif across scales

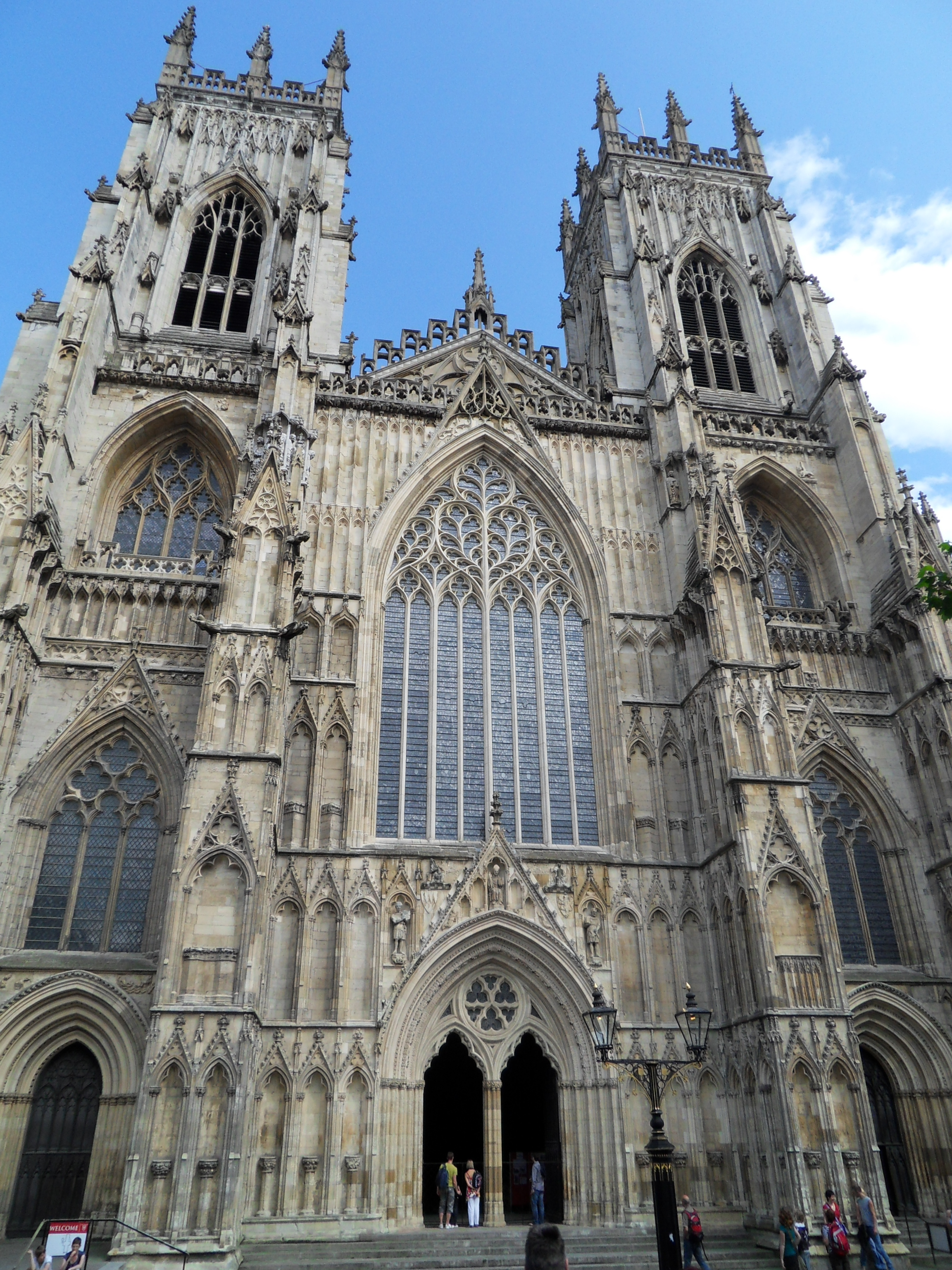
Arch-and-gable over the west door and west window of York Minster, flanked by arched and gabled niches

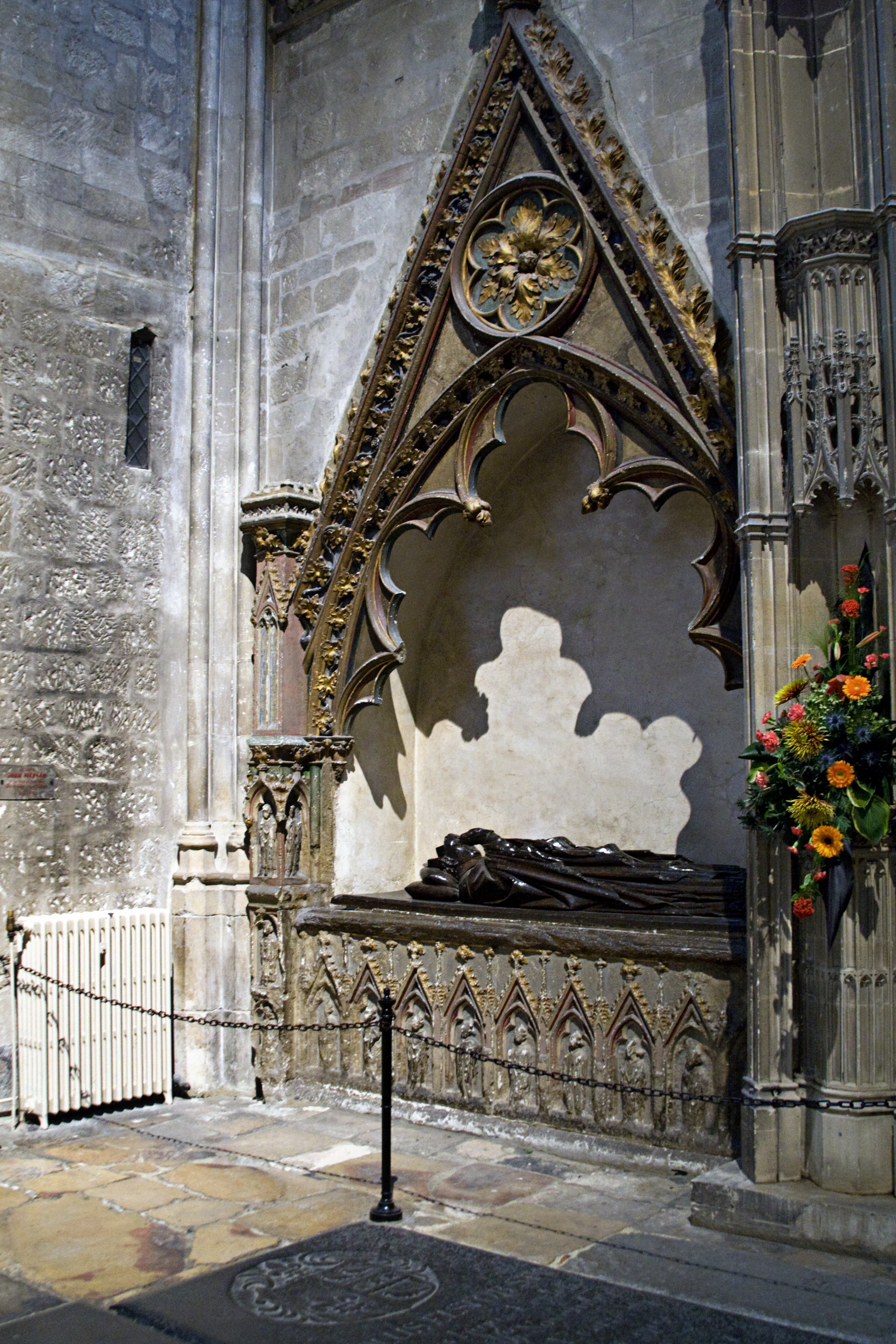
Arch-and-gable over the Peckham tomb, Canterbury Cathedral (d.1292)

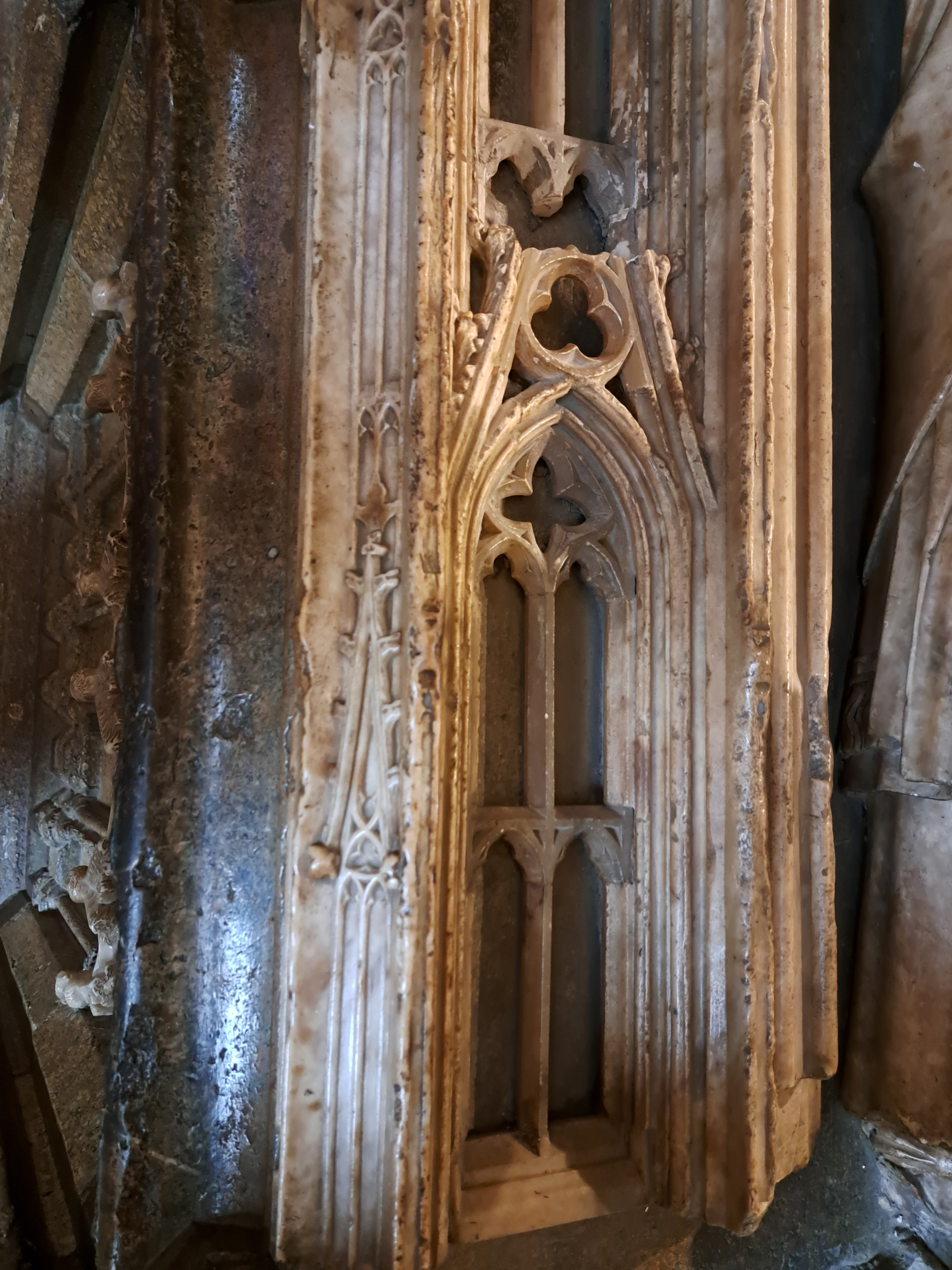
Damaged micro-arch-and-gable on the Stratford tomb, Canterbury Cathedral (d.1348)

=== Military architecture ===
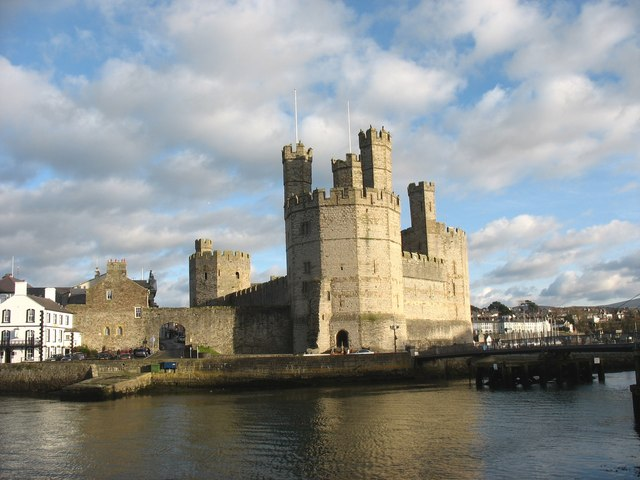
The Eagle Tower at Caernarfon Castle

In castle architecture, the Decorated era was marked by a new complexity and massiveness. The reign of Edward I, crusader and Arthurian enthusiast, was a high point of courtly romantic culture and feudal exuberance, and castle building was an important aspect of that. Many particularly large castles were built at this time due to Edward's conquest of the Welsh in the 1270s-80s. The ubiquitous round tower of the 13th century was occasionally superseded by the polygonal tower, as at Caernarfon, Denbigh and Knaresborough, which both echoed Roman fortifications and linked to the complex spatial experiments seen in churches at the same time. The geometry of the great tower at Knaresborough is particularly elaborate, intersecting an octagon with an equilateral triangle. The upper parts of castles became increasingly crowded, echoing the micro-architecture seen in churches and providing a fine feudal-looking silhouette, as at Caernarfon, where the Eagle Tower bristles with three turrets, themselves topped with carved eagles. Dunstanburgh Castle, now heavily ruined, was even more extreme, with square turrets protruding from the round tower-fronts of the gatehouse in a way that was not repeated. The introduction of the machicolation, probably first seen in Britain at Conwy (1283-87), added another way to decorate castle wallheads, as well as improving defence. There was a tendency in the details of castle architecture to evoke strength and massiveness through the use of heavy wave-mouldings, as at Caernarfon.

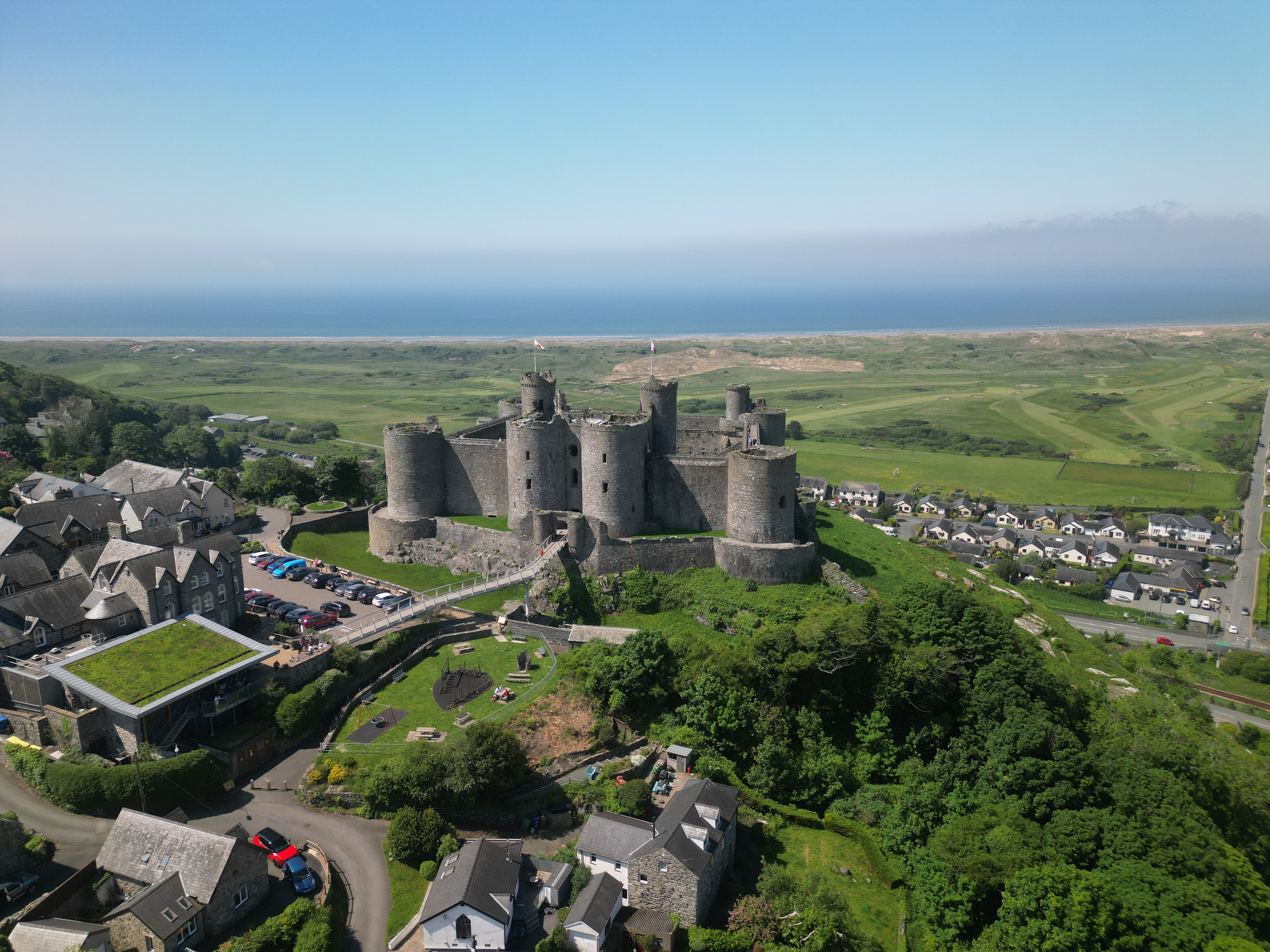
Harlech Castle, a concentric castle with massive round mural towers and a Tonbridge-style gatehouse

As well as new forms, the Decorated period saw the culmination of ideas developed in the 13th century, such as symmetry, concentric fortification, round towers and twin-towered gatehouses. The most innovative centres were those of the King's works and the de Clare earls of Gloucester, who held major castles in south Wales and at Tonbridge in Kent. Henry III's ill-fated works of the 1240s at the Tower of London probably inspired the innovative Clare gatehouse at Tonbridge, in which the gatehouse became a powerful self-contained fortress and residence. This form of gatehouse was much-copied, and is known as the Tonbridge-style gatehouse or gatehouse-keep. For instance, it was used at Gilbert de Clare's mighty lake-surrounded concentric castle at Caerphilly, and then in Edward I's castles of Aberystwyth, Harlech and Beaumaris. The largest mural towers dated from this period, such as Roger Bigod's mighty portcullis-protected Marten's Tower at Chepstow, which accompanied a lavish new domestic range.

=== Domestic architecture ===
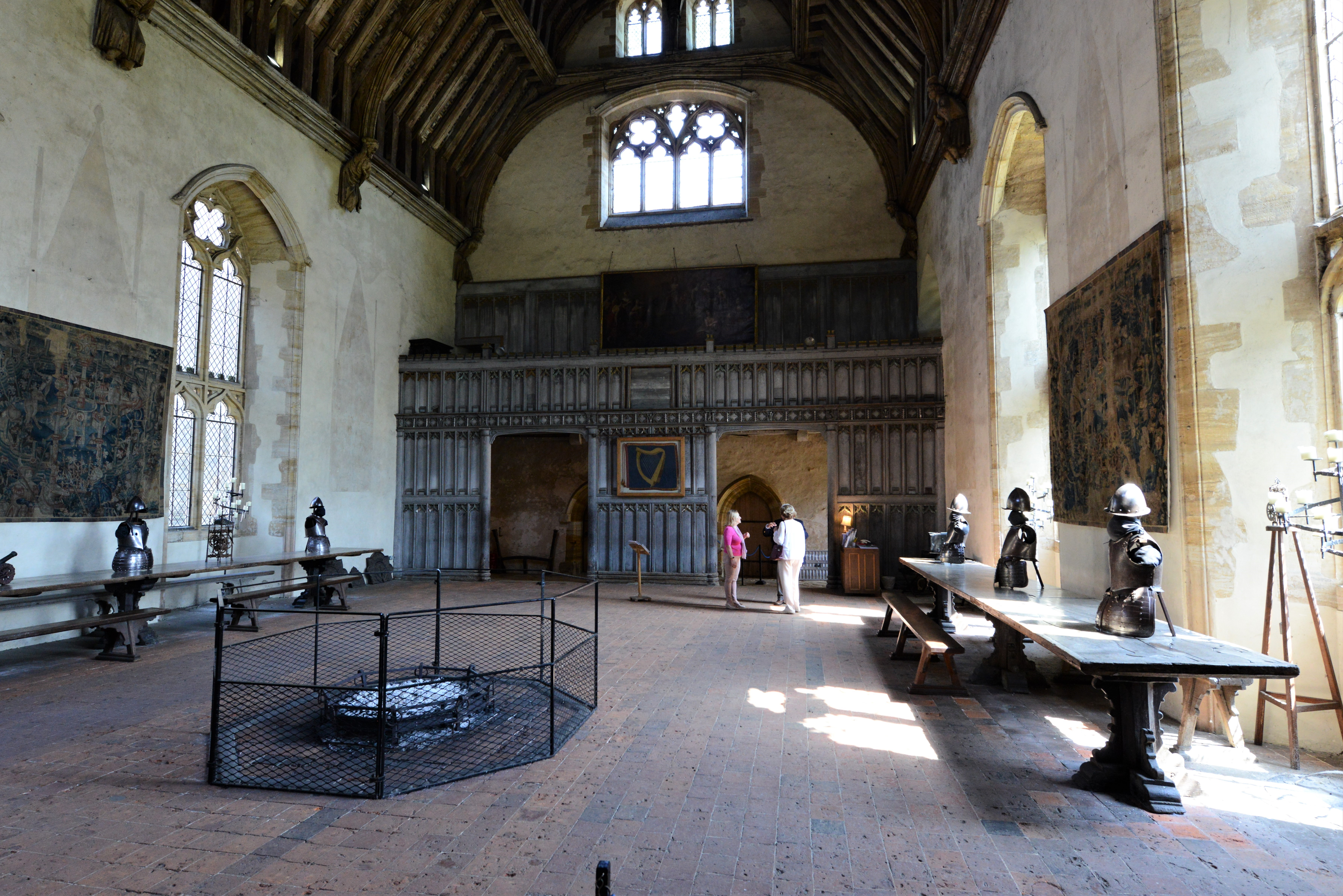
The hall at Penshurst Place, with traceried windows and arch-braced roof. The screen is later.

The most notable development in domestic architecture was the crystallisation of the standard tripartite plan of manor houses in the late 13th century. This consisted of a central hall, with an entrance screened off at one end and a dais for the lord's high table at the other. At each end of the hall was a cross wing. That at the 'high' end housed the lord's chamber on the first floor, while that at the 'low' end housed the kitchen, buttery and pantry. The principal locations for architectural decoration were the main entrance, and the windows and roof of hall and chamber. Many houses had some form of fortification, though whether this was for defence or display is a matter of debate, with more recent historiography tending towards the latter. Door and window details generally followed church architecture, though naturally the traceries were simpler. However, this did not preclude high-quality stonework, as may be seen at the near-intact Penshurst Place, built in the 1340s, where the windows are in the fashionable Kentish style. Tall windows featured transoms, to enable the upper part to be glazed and the lower part shuttered; this feature was later adopted in Perpendicular church architecture. Roofs were an increasingly prominent feature, as halls became aisleless, requiring feats of carpentry to span them. Occasionally stone transverse arches were used, as at Mayfield Palace, but a more common solution was the arch-braced roof, of which Penshurst Place has a good example. Towards the end of the period, the hammer-beam roof was developed, the earliest surviving example being at Pilgrims' Hall, Winchester.

== Notable examples ==
This list is not intended to be comprehensive, but merely to illustrate some of the most significant, influential or instructive examples.

=== Bristol Cathedral ===
The east end was rebuilt to a very unusual hallenkirche form, where the aisles are as high as the nave. The vaulting is also experimental, with that over the aisles being carried on flying bridges, while in one chapel the ribs and webbing are separated.

=== Bristol, St Mary Redcliffe ===
Regarded as one of the finest parish churches in the country, and completely rebuilt in the later Middle Ages. The building is cruciform and vaulted throughout, with a high north-west spire (much-restored) and a hexagonal north porch featuring Persian-inspired portals.

=== Carlisle Cathedral ===
The east end was rebuilt after a fire in 1291, retaining the Early English aisles. The central vessel is not vaulted, but has harmonious proportions. The large east window has fine curvilinear tracery, with some original glass.

=== Caernarfon Castle ===
Begun by Edward I in 1283 and never completed, it was to have been the capital of his new Welsh colony. Its polygonal towers and carved eagles are redolent with imperial references, but it also has the heavy mouldings and complex planning of Decorated architecture in for normal circumstances, especially in the gatehouse, designed by Walter of Hereford.

=== Dorchester Abbey ===
The abbey church was largely rebuilt in several phases from the late 13th to late 14th centuries. The north choir aisle has three-light late Geometrical windows with spherical triangle tracery, while the austere south chapel and nave aisle have intersecting tracery and original murals. The east end of the south chapel is vaulted (rebuilt in the 19th century) to display the shrine of St Birinus (also rebuilt). The presbytery is a slightly later extension, projecting beyond the chancel chapels to allow tall windows on three sides. The traceries are highly unusual, even by Decorated standards, filling the whole windows. To the north is the Jesse window, combining branching tracery with stone and glass representations of Christ's ancestry. The east window is so wide that a central buttress blocks part of the tracery, with a (Victorianised) rose above. The south window is plainer, with almost Perpendicular hexagonal reticulations, and below it a very ornate sedilia depicting the Seven Deadly Sins, with little ogee triangle windows behind the seats.

=== Ely Cathedral ===
A large new Lady Chapel, almost detached from the north transept, was begun in 1321. Unfortunately, the crossing tower collapsed the next year, forcing resources to be diverted to repair. The heart of the Norman building was entirely removed, with a large stone octagon 69 feet across opening up the centre. This supports timber tierceron vaults, which in turn conceal hammer-beams carrying a timber octagon rotated 12.5 degrees, a remarkable conceit. The choir also had to be rebuilt, in a form which matches the proportions of the (already rich) 13th century presbytery, but coats them in further ornament and sinuous tracery. After this, work on the Lady Chapel was resumed, and finally completed in 1373. Its (now defaced) niches with nodding ogees are some of the most elaborate in the country, while its windows already look towards the Perpendicular. The low-pitched lierne vault is the widest to survive, spanning 46 feet.

=== Exeter Cathedral ===
Except for the Norman transeptal towers, the church was rebuilt from the 1270s onwards. The work at the east end, originally two-storeyed, was remodelled to incorporate the modish triforium seen in the nave. The lack of a crossing means the tierceron vault can run through the whole building, the longest surviving church vault. The traceries become more flowing towards the west end, which has a screen of sculpted kings. The pulpitum, choir stalls and bishop's throne are original. In 1337, Bishop Grandisson of Exeter founded a smaller copy of the cathedral at Ottery St Mary, with the same transeptal towers and long vault, as a chantry college for himself and his family.

=== Hereford Cathedral ===
The north transept is directly derived from Westminster, being a relatively orthodox Rayonnant, though with unusual near-triangular arches. The central tower is a bulky piece of West-Country Decorated, with complicated paired buttresses dripping with ballflower and formerly carrying a spire.

=== Lichfield Cathedral ===
The Gothic rebuilding of the church was completed in the Decorated period, and the nave is a smaller Geometrical offshoot of Westminster. The west front is very flat in the English manner, still retaining spires on the towers. Once the nave was complete, rebuilding began again at the east end, with an unusual polygonal-apsed Lady Chapel.

=== Lincoln Cathedral ===
The Angel Choir at the east end was built in 1256-80, one of the earliest examples of Geometrical Decorated. Its spandrel sculptures of angels derive from Westminster. The east window is the first eight-lighter ever built, while the clerestory introduces spatial complexity by having a second layer of open tracery behind the main windows. Later Decorated works are the cloister (1296, Geometrical with timber vaults) two arches into the choir aisles, with carving on the cusp of stiff-leaf and naturalism, the crossing tower (1307-11, formerly with the tallest spire in the world), the pulpitum, entirely covered in carving, and the Bishop's Eye south rose window (1330s), to an unusual pattern like two leaves.

=== Patrington, St Patrick ===
The church is almost entirely early 14tth century, retaining its high-pitched roofs. It is cruciform and, remarkably for a parish church, has vaulted double aisles to both transepts. The south transept also has an apsidal eastern chapel, giving complex cross-vistas across the church akin to those of Wells. The window traceries range from York-derived Geometrical in the transepts to Curvilinear elsewhere. The internal details are later Decorated, with broad, undulating pier profiles and 'knobbly' foliage capitals. Construction appears to have been interrupted by the Black Death, with the austere upper parts of the tower and the unique arcaded spire probably being work of 1368-71, designed by John de Patrington and early Perpendicular in style. The rood screen is original.

=== Penshurst Place ===
Built after 1341 for Sir John Pulteney, this is one of the best preserved 14th century houses. Its window tracery is similar to that of contemporary Kentish churches, and its chestnut roof is hugely impressive.

=== Saint Stephen's Chapel, Westminster ===
This building, though small and now all but destroyed, was one of the most architecturally important in England, designed by Michael of Canterbury and his son Thomas of Canterbury. It brought together ogees, split cusps and micro-architecture in a gorgeous chapel, of which only the heavily-restored lower chapel survived the fire of 1834.

=== Salisbury Cathedral ===
The octagonal chapter house and cloister are Westminster-derived Rayonnant work, with four-light windows. The famed tower and spire are an addition of c.1300, now the tallest in the country, and richly decorated with ballflower without detracting from its verticality.

==== Selby Abbey ====
The eastern limb is an elegant two-storey example of Curvilinear, with a fine east window retaining original stained glass in the east window. There were formerly statues above the piers, marked by the surviving canopies. The timber vault and much of the carving are reconstructions after a fire in 1906.

=== Southwell Minster ===
This dependency of York gained a chapter house, shrunk from that at York, in the 1290s. Its stone vault has no central pier. The entrance and canons' stalls are decorated with some of the country's finest naturalistic foliage, praised by Pevsner in The Leaves of Southwell. By the time the vault was erected, the foliage was already starting to become stylised again. The pulpitum is closely related to that at Lincoln.

=== Tewkesbury Abbey ===
The east end of this Norman church was rebuilt to house the Despencers' mausoleum, unusually retaining the chevet plan, but overlaying it with complex polygonal geometry. The survival of the original stained glass and tombs give a good impression of the crowded richness that characterised churches before the Reformation. The lierne vaults added to the whole building are some of the most elaborate to survive anywhere.

=== Wells Cathedral ===
The chapter house is raised above a crypt, with a famous branching staircase rising to it. Inside is a palm vault. After the chapter house was completed, attention moved to the east end of the church, with a new octagonal lady chapel and rectangular presbytery connected by a complex retrochoir. The east window tracery is almost Perpendicular in spirit. The central tower followed, but soon became unstable, with scissor arches being inserted by William Joy.

=== Westminster Abbey ===
The rebuilding of Westminster after 1245, though plagued by delays, was crucial to the formation of the Decorated. While English masons ignored the great height and chevet, the bar tracery, surface ornamentation and naturalistic foliage were immediately popular, and formed much of the basis of Geometrical Decorated.

=== York Minster ===
Rebuilding of the Norman church continued with the nave, begun in 1291 but not completed until the 1360s. The building has the thin walls and brittleness of the Rayonnant, and the west front has more depth and grander portals than are usual in England. However, the great west window is a late blossoming of Curvilinear, the lierne vault is timber in the English manner, and the tower tops are Perpendicular. The octagonal chapter house was the subject of a separate campaign, completed in 1342. It has no central pier, so the vault is again of timber. The windows are Geometrical, still with much of their original stained glass, and this, combined with the syncopated rippling of the stalls, gives the building the dream-like shimmering characteristic of the Decorated.

== Gallery ==
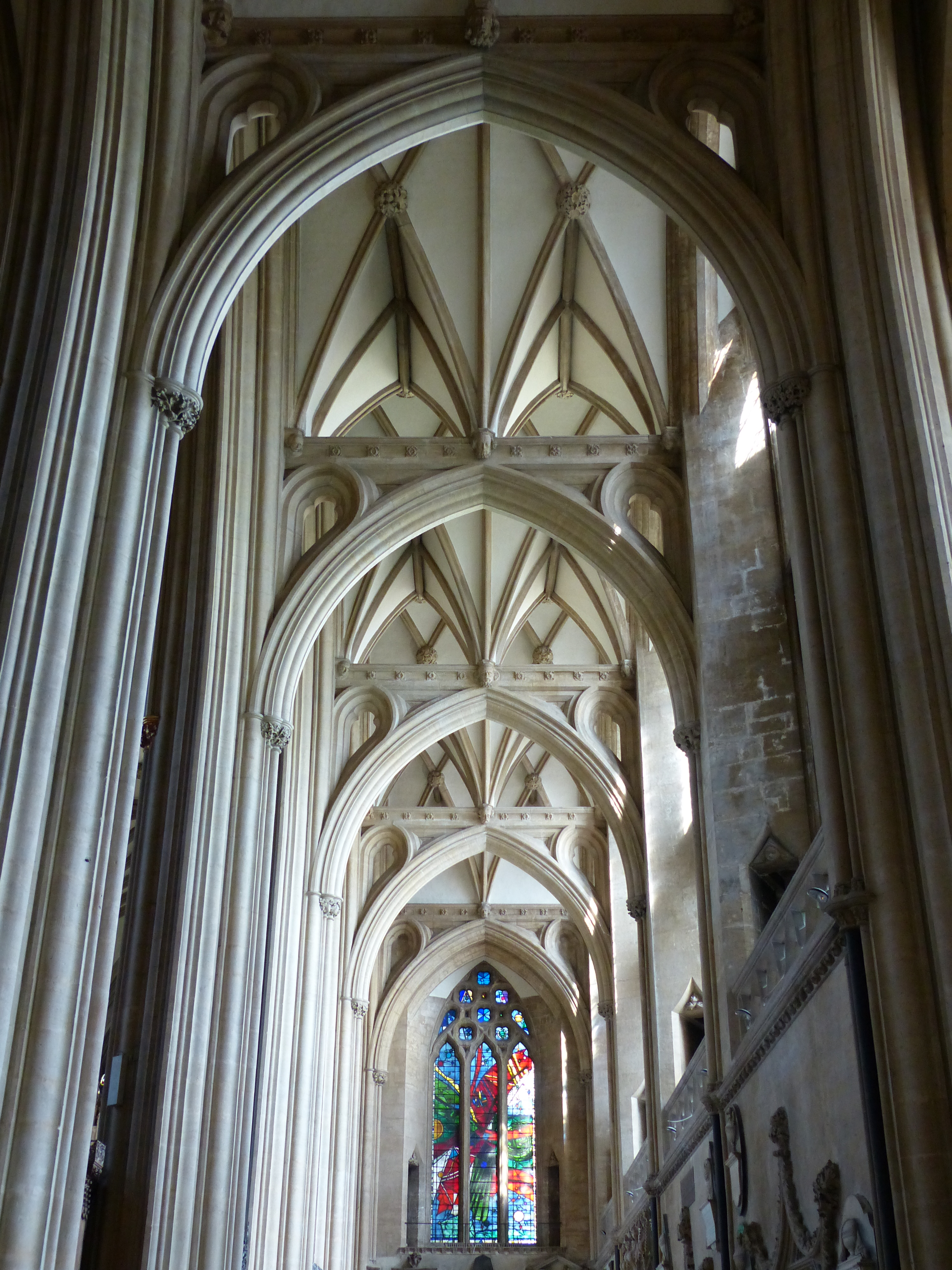
Vaulting at Bristol Cathedral

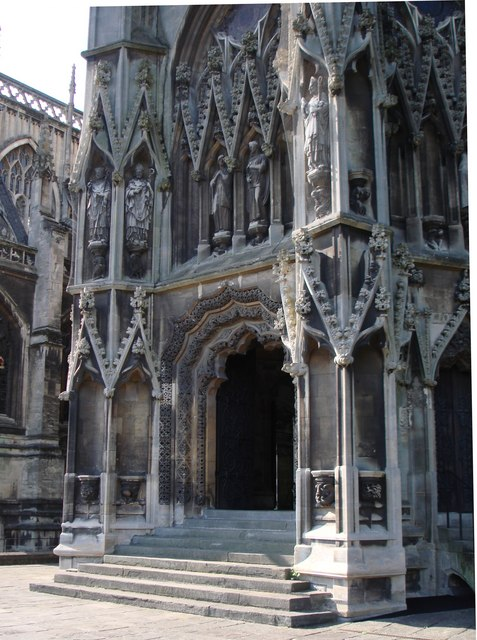
St Mary Redcliffe north porch with 'Berkeley arch'

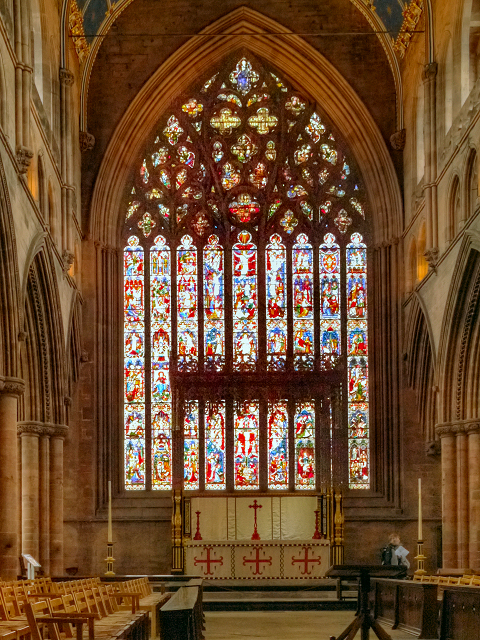
Carlisle Cathedral east window

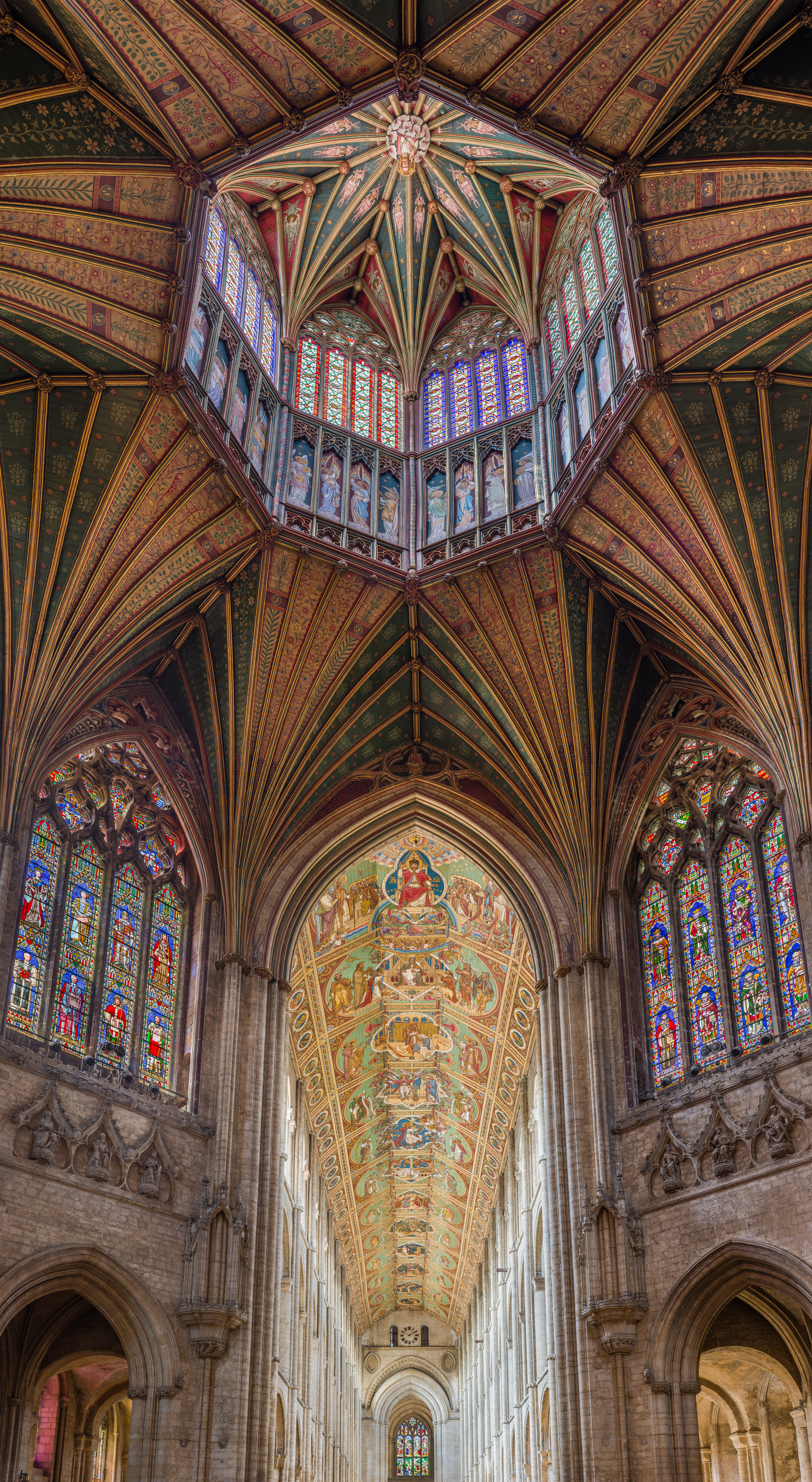
The octagonal lantern at Ely Cathedral

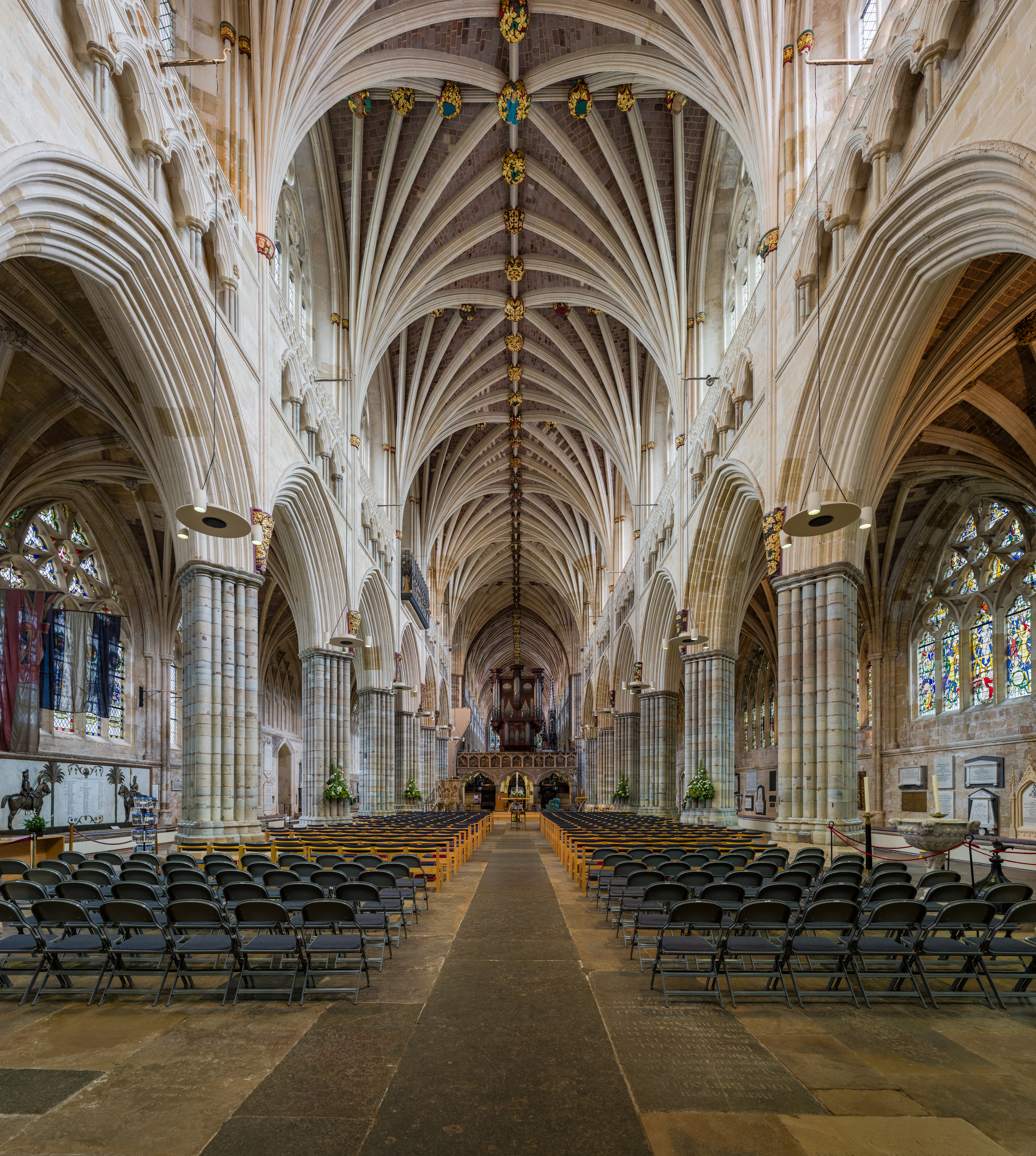
The nave with tierceron vaults at Exeter Cathedral

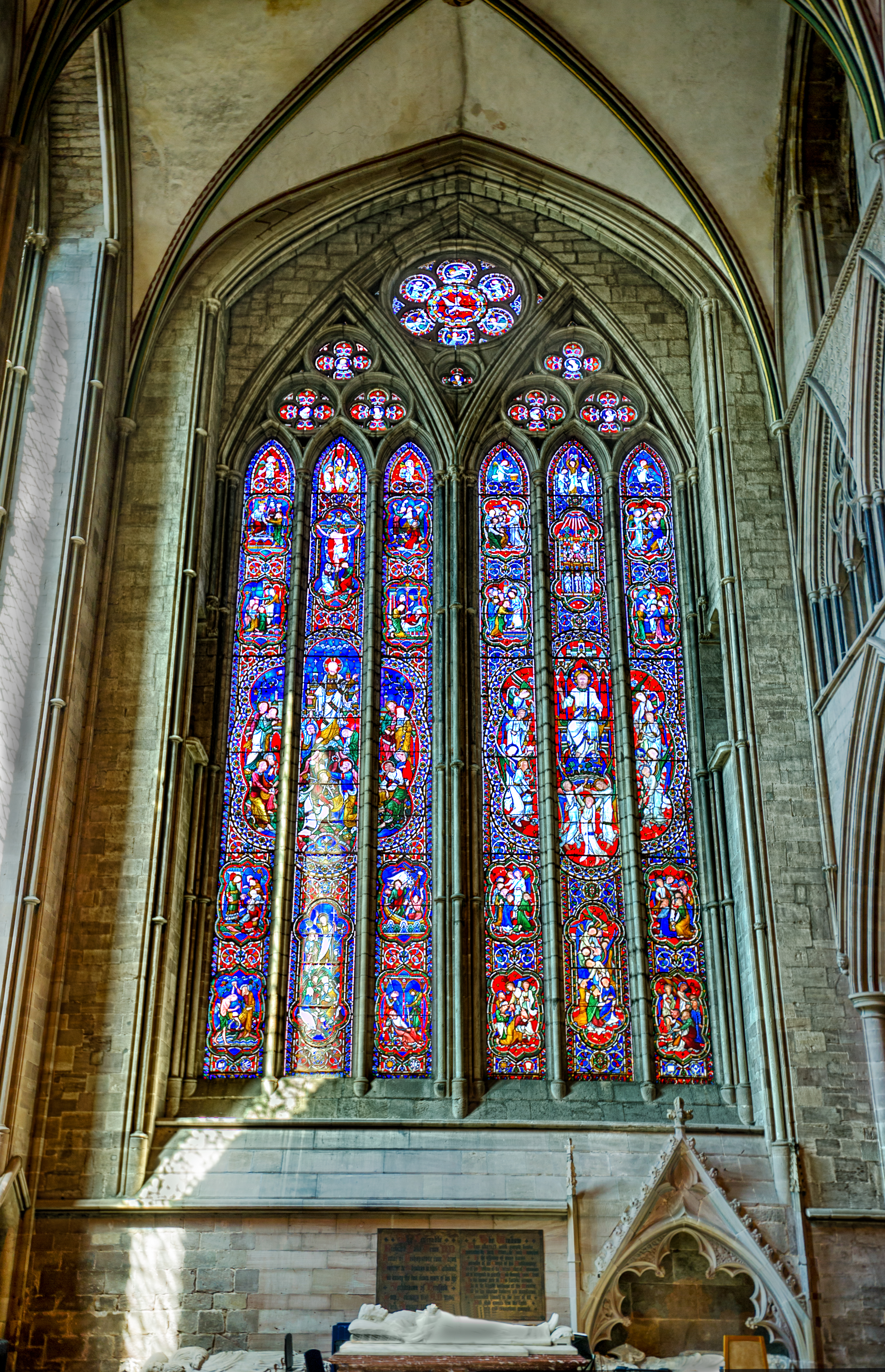
Angular Geometrical bar tracery at Hereford Cathedral

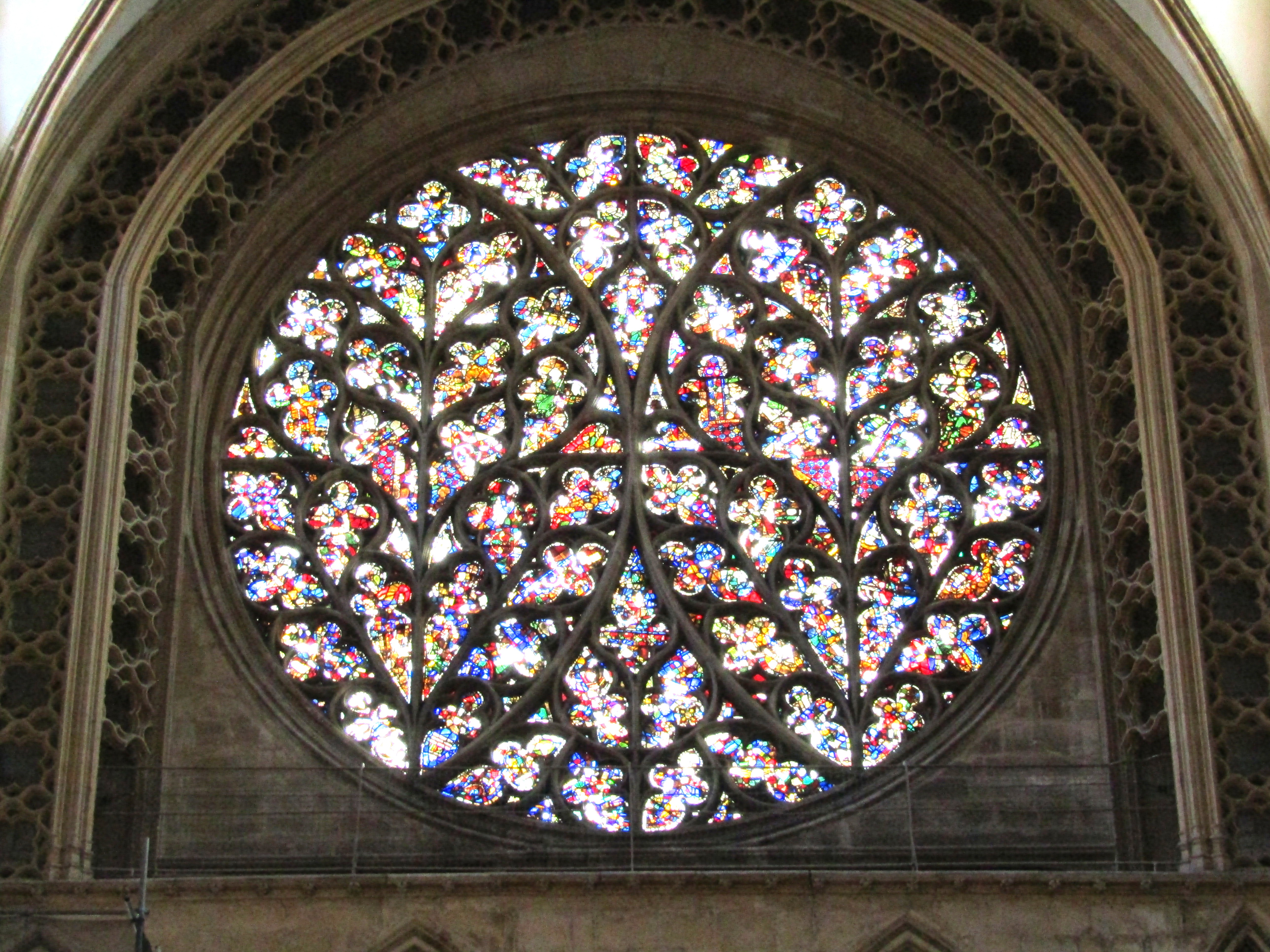
The Bishop's Eye rose window, Lincoln Cathedral

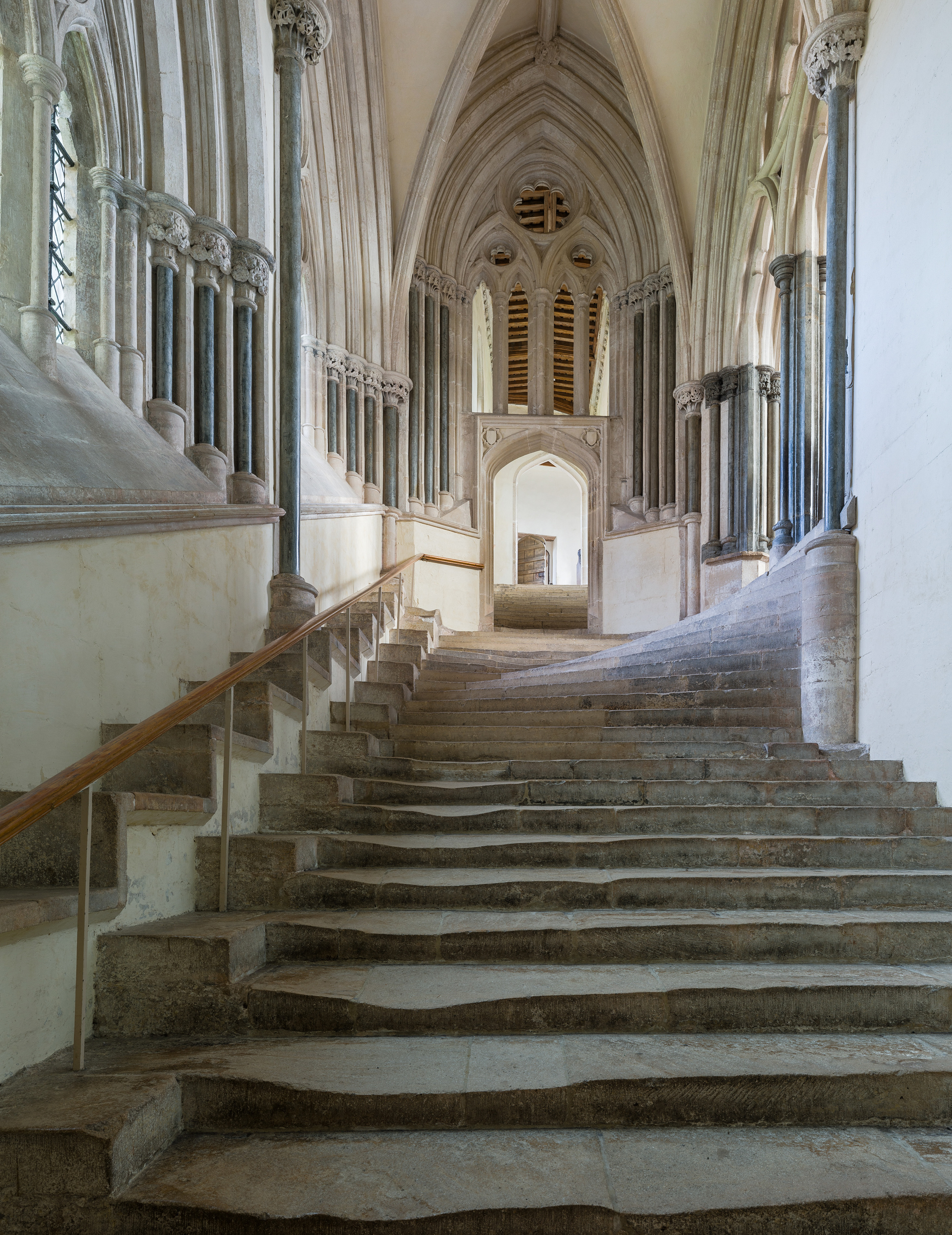
The chapter house stair, Wells Cathedral

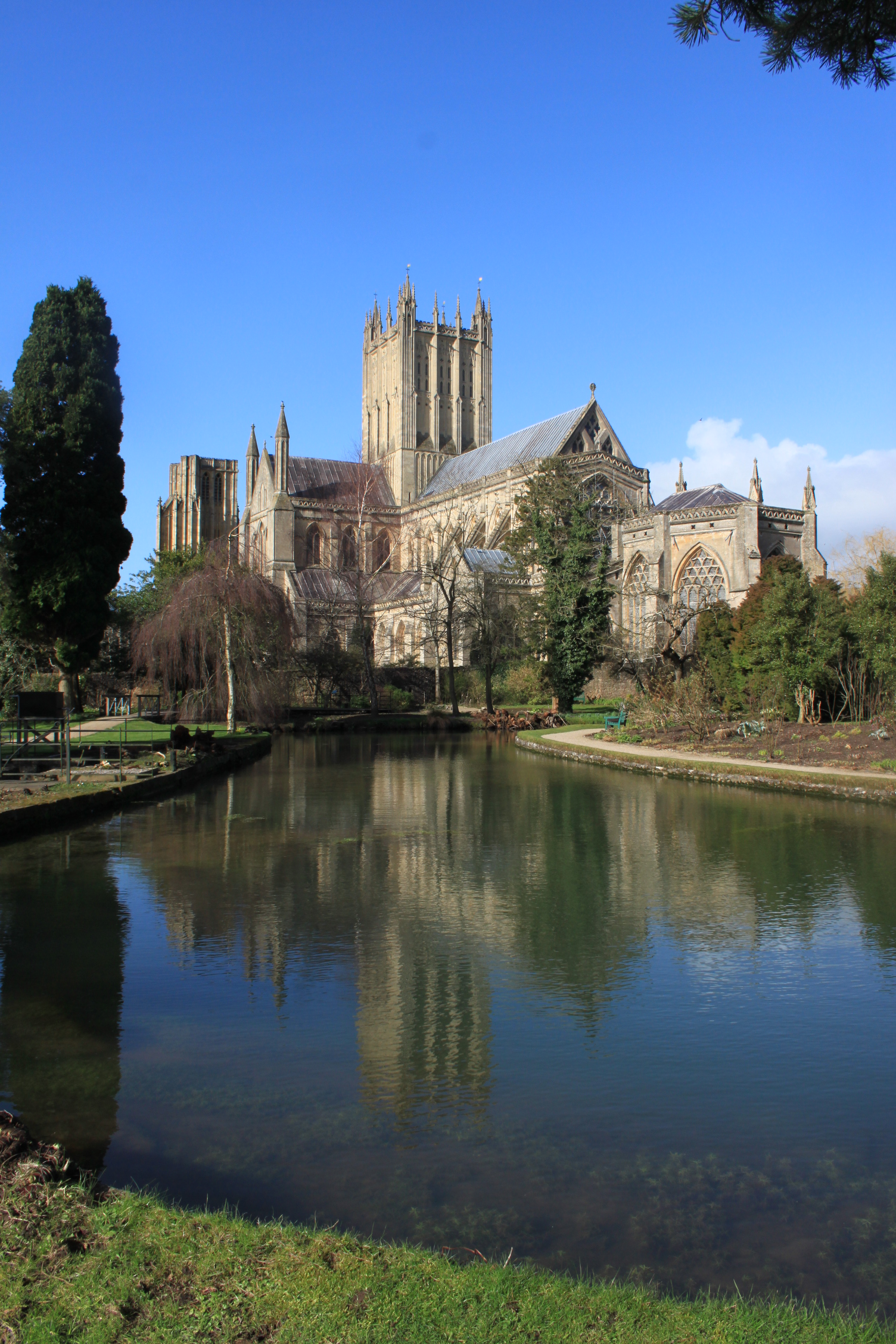
Wells Cathedral from the east: the central tower, east end and chapter house are Decorated

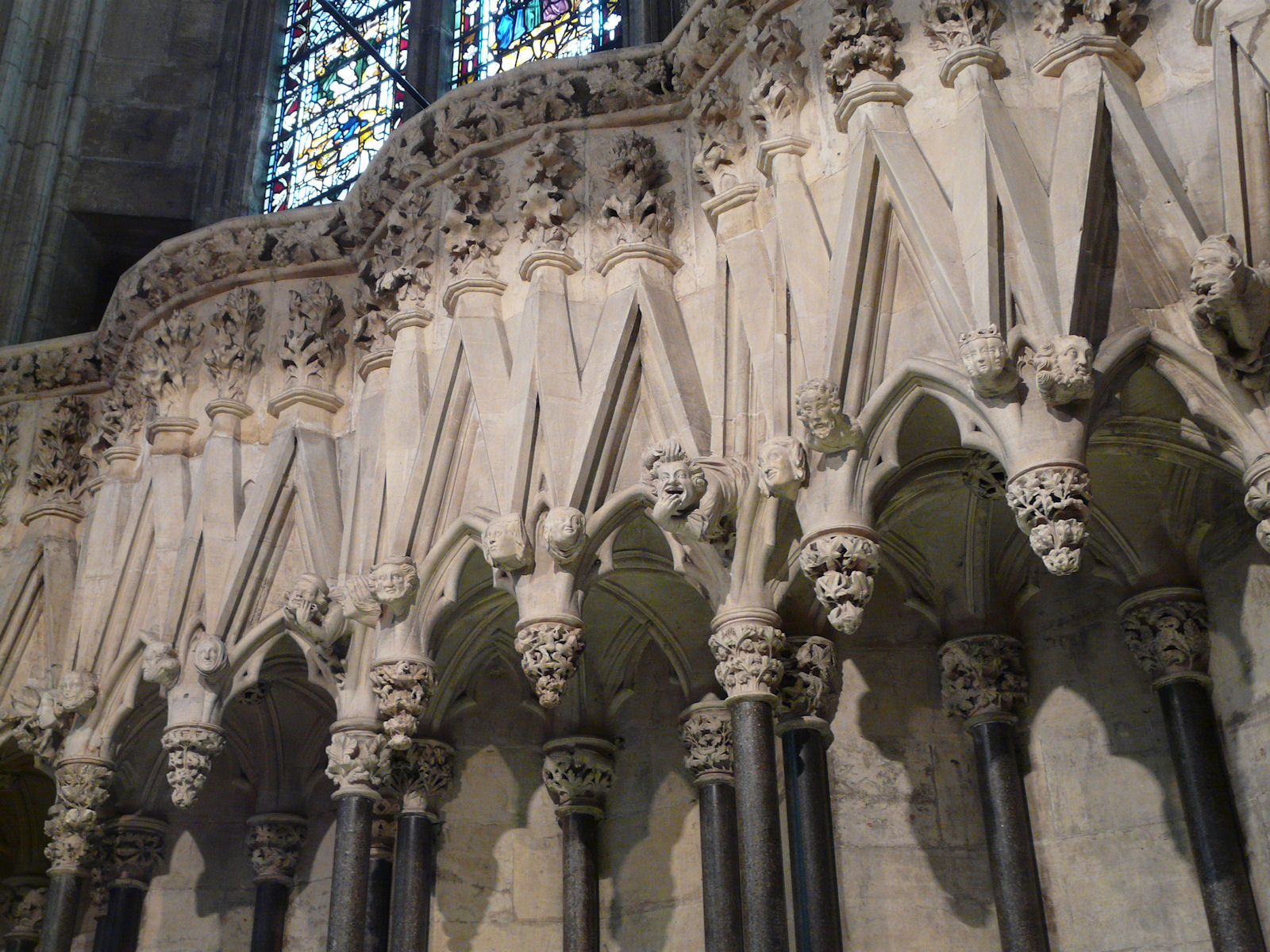
Stall canopies in the chapter house of York Minster

== See also ==
- English Gothic architecture
- Gothic architecture
- Architecture of the medieval cathedrals of England
