= Grade I listed buildings in City of Canterbury =

There are over 9,000 Grade I listed buildings in England. This page is a list of these buildings in the district of Canterbury in Kent.

== List of buildings ==
Name	Location	Type	Completed (Note: The date given is the date used by Historic England as significant for the initial building or that of an important part in the structure's description.)	Date designated	Grid ref. (Note: Sometimes known as OSGB36, the grid reference is based on the British national grid reference system used by the Ordnance Survey.) Geo-coordinates	Entry number (Note: The "List Entry Number" is a unique number assigned to each listed building and scheduled monument by Historic England.)	Image
Church of the Holy Innocents	Adisham	Church	Late 12th century	30 January 1967	TR2276554268; 51°14′39″N 1°11′25″E	1123715	Church of the Holy Innocents More images
Broome Park	Barham	Country house	1635–38	29 September 1952	TR2186848244; 51°11′25″N 1°10′26″E	1084927	Broome Park More images
Church of St John the Baptist	Barham	Church	Late 13th century	30 January 1967	TR2097150000; 51°12′23″N 1°09′43″E	1084903	Church of St John the Baptist More images
Church of St Mary	Patrixbourne, Bekesbourne-with-Patrixbourne	Church	Late 12th century	30 January 1967	TR1896255148; 51°15′12″N 1°08′11″E	1336572	Church of St Mary More images
Church of St Peter	Bekesbourne, Bekesbourne-with-Patrixbourne	Church	12th century	30 January 1967	TR1951155469; 51°15′22″N 1°08′40″E	1298996	Church of St Peter More images
Bourne Park House	Bourne Park, Bishopsbourne	Country house	1701	29 September 1952	TR1812353136; 51°14′08″N 1°07′24″E	1298969	Bourne Park House More images
Church of St Mary	Bishopsbourne	Church	13th century	30 January 1967	TR1877552617; 51°13′51″N 1°07′56″E	1085693	Church of St Mary More images
Church of St Mary	Chartham	Church	13th century	30 January 1967	TR1068855074; 51°15′21″N 1°01′05″E	1100352	Church of St Mary More images
Church of St Mary the Virgin	Chislet	Church	Norman	30 January 1967	TR2245064308; 51°20′04″N 1°11′31″E	1085653	Church of St Mary the Virgin More images
Church of St Mary	Fordwich	Church	Saxon	30 January 1967	TR1810759826; 51°17′45″N 1°07′37″E	1063709	Church of St Mary More images
The Old Leper Church of St Nicholas	Harbledown, Harbledown and Rough Common	Almshouse	Late 11th century	14 March 1980	TR1304558153; 51°16′58″N 1°03′13″E	1085632	The Old Leper Church of St Nicholas More images
Church of St Martin	Herne, Herne and Broomfield	Church	Early 14th century	29 September 1951	TR1826665852; 51°20′59″N 1°07′59″E	1084972	Church of St Martin More images
Herne Windmill	Herne, Herne and Broomfield	Smock mill	1781	29 September 1951	TR1851066486; 51°21′19″N 1°08′13″E	1084984	Herne Windmill More images
Church of St John	Ickham, Ickham and Well	Church	Late 12th century	30 January 1967	TR2221558140; 51°16′45″N 1°11′05″E	1085626	Church of St John More images
Church of St Giles	Kingston	Church	Possibly part Saxon	30 January 1967	TR1980851261; 51°13′06″N 1°08′46″E	1373855	Church of St Giles More images
Barn at Littlebourne Court	Littlebourne Court, Littlebourne	Aisled barn	Early 14th century	30 January 1967	TR2102857884; 51°16′38″N 1°10′04″E	1085595	Barn at Littlebourne Court More images
Church of St Vincent	Littlebourne	Church	13th century	30 January 1967	TR2105557865; 51°16′37″N 1°10′05″E	1051071	Church of St Vincent More images
Church of St Mary	Nackington, Lower Hardres	Church	Norman	30 January 1967	TR1569254588; 51°14′59″N 1°05′22″E	1085575	Church of St Mary More images
Church of All Saints	Petham	Church	Norman	30 January 1967	TR1306051245; 51°13′14″N 1°02′59″E	1336595	Church of All Saints More images
Church of St Nicholas	Sturry	Church	Norman	30 January 1967	TR1761160110; 51°17′55″N 1°07′13″E	1298867	Church of St Nicholas More images
Tithe Barn formerly the School Hall	Sturry	Benedictine grange	Early 16th century	29 September 1952	TR1759660191; 51°17′57″N 1°07′12″E	1085499	Tithe Barn formerly the School Hall More images
Church of St Peter and St Paul	Upper Hardres	Church	Norman	30 January 1967	TR1527950734; 51°12′55″N 1°04′52″E	1045850	Church of St Peter and St Paul More images
Church of St Bartholomew	Waltham	Church	Norman	30 January 1967	TR1127248449; 51°11′46″N 1°01′21″E	1367044	Church of St Bartholomew More images
Church of All Saints	Westbere	Church	Pre-Conquest	30 January 1967	TR1922361073; 51°18′24″N 1°08′38″E	1085482	Church of All Saints More images
Church of St Andrew	Wickhambreaux	Church	Perpendicular	30 January 1967	TR2200358736; 51°17′04″N 1°10′56″E	1367089	Church of St Andrew More images
Church of St Mary	Stodmarsh, Wickhambreaux	Church	13th century	30 January 1967	TR2202360579; 51°18′04″N 1°11′01″E	1085456	Church of St Mary More images
Church of St Margaret	Womenswold	Church	13th century	30 January 1967	TR2274150585; 51°12′40″N 1°11′16″E	1085468	Church of St Margaret More images
Blackfriars	Canterbury	Guest house	13th century	3 December 1949	TR1484058082; 51°16′53″N 1°04′45″E	1242335	Blackfriars More images
Canterbury Castle	Canterbury	Keep	Norman	3 December 1949	TR1455357430; 51°16′32″N 1°04′29″E	1252100	Canterbury Castle More images
Cathedral Choir School	Canterbury	Choir school	14th century	3 December 1949	TR1519057958; 51°16′48″N 1°05′03″E	1252933	Cathedral Choir School More images
Chapel of St Pancras Ruins & Remains of St Augustine's Abbey	Canterbury	Abbey	From 598AD	3 December 1949	TR1549557755; 51°16′41″N 1°05′18″E	1096932	Chapel of St Pancras Ruins & Remains of St Augustine's Abbey More images
Chapter House to Christchurch Cathedral	Canterbury	Cathedral	From 1304	7 September 1973	TR1510257950; 51°16′48″N 1°04′58″E	1085063	Chapter House to Christchurch Cathedral More images
Christchurch Cathedral	Canterbury	Cathedral	11th century onward	3 December 1949	TR1508457922; 51°16′47″N 1°04′57″E	1336823	Christchurch Cathedral More images
Christchurch Gateway	Canterbury	Cathedral precinct	1517	3 December 1949	TR1498457860; 51°16′45″N 1°04′52″E	1085119	Christchurch Gateway More images
Church of St Martin	Canterbury	Parish church	7th Century	3 December 1949	TR1586457757; 51°16′41″N 1°05′37″E	1242166	Church of St Martin More images
Church of St Mildred	St Mildred's, Canterbury	Church	13th century	3 December 1949	TR1450057514; 51°16′35″N 1°04′27″E	1085039	Church of St Mildred More images
Church of St Peter	Canterbury	Church	14th–15th century	3 December 1949	TR1473658015; 51°16′51″N 1°04′40″E	1242343	Church of St Peter More images
Church of St Stephen	Hackington, Canterbury	Church	12th century	3 December 1949	TR1483259158; 51°17′28″N 1°04′47″E	1336844	Church of St Stephen More images
Cloister to Christchurch Cathedral	Canterbury	Cloister	1390–1411	3 December 1949	TR1504857959; 51°16′49″N 1°04′56″E	1085062	Cloister to Christchurch Cathedral More images
Dark Entry	Canterbury	Cathedral precinct	Medieval	7 September 1973	TR1510657958; 51°16′48″N 1°04′59″E	1085064	Dark Entry More images
Eastbridge Hospital	Canterbury	Guest house	1180	7 September 1973	TR1478557921; 51°16′48″N 1°04′42″E	1085030	Eastbridge Hospital More images
Fyndon's Gateway (The Great Gateway) at St Augustine's College	Canterbury	Arch	1283–1309	3 December 1949	TR1538657845; 51°16′44″N 1°05′13″E	1096936	Fyndon's Gateway (The Great Gateway) at St Augustine's College More images
Greyfriars Monastery	Canterbury	Religious house	1267	3 December 1949	TR1468157810; 51°16′44″N 1°04′36″E	1242684	Greyfriars Monastery More images
Lavatory Tower	Canterbury	Tower	c.1160	7 September 1973	TR1512957952; 51°16′48″N 1°05′00″E	1336825	Lavatory Tower More images
Library to Christchurch Cathedral	Canterbury	Library	Before 1093	7 September 1973	TR1509957967; 51°16′49″N 1°04′58″E	1336824	Library to Christchurch Cathedral More images
Meister Omers	Canterbury	Cathedral precinct	Early 15th century	3 December 1949	TR1524457920; 51°16′47″N 1°05′06″E	1336827	Meister Omers More images
Norman Staircase	Canterbury	Steps	12th century	3 December 1949	TR1513458107; 51°16′53″N 1°05′00″E	1253715	Norman Staircase More images
Poor Priests Hospital	Canterbury	Hospital	Founded 1217	3 December 1949	TR1472757779; 51°16′43″N 1°04′39″E	1259898	Poor Priests Hospital More images
Prior Sellinge Gate	Canterbury	House	15th century	3 December 1949	TR1515857988; 51°16′49″N 1°05′01″E	1336829	Prior Sellinge Gate More images
Prior's Chapel	Canterbury	Library	1660	7 September 1973	TR1514157951; 51°16′48″N 1°05′00″E	1085065	Prior's Chapel More images
Remains of Cellarer's Hall in Archbishop's Palace Garden	Canterbury	Archbishop's palace	1193–1228	7 September 1973	TR1505357999; 51°16′50″N 1°04′56″E	1085082	Remains of Cellarer's Hall in Archbishop's Palace Garden More images
Remains of Roman Town House	Canterbury	Hypocaust	c.300AD	7 September 1973	TR1501157783; 51°16′43″N 1°04′53″E	1260298	Remains of Roman Town House More images
The Archbishop's Palace or the Old Palace	Canterbury	Archbishop's palace	1896	3 May 1967	TR1501557977; 51°16′49″N 1°04′54″E	1085066	The Archbishop's Palace or the Old Palace More images
The Archdeacon of Canterbury's House	Canterbury	House	c.1400	3 December 1949	TR1508758010; 51°16′50″N 1°04′58″E	1336791	The Archdeacon of Canterbury's House More images
The Cathedral Appeal Fund Office & the Deanery	Canterbury	Deanery	15th century	3 December 1949	TR1520658015; 51°16′50″N 1°05′04″E	1252941	The Cathedral Appeal Fund Office & the Deanery More images
The Cemetery Gateway at St Augustine's College	Canterbury	Cemetery	14th century	3 December 1949	TR1536057716; 51°16′40″N 1°05′11″E	1096935	The Cemetery Gateway at St Augustine's College More images
The Church of St Dunstan's Without the West Gate	Canterbury	Parish church	Late 11th/early 12th century	3 December 1949	TR1424058314; 51°17′01″N 1°04′15″E	1241793	The Church of St Dunstan's Without the West Gate More images
Former Blackfriars Monastery	Canterbury	Former monastery	13th century and later	3 December 1949	TR1486258076; 51°16′53″N 1°04′46″E	1085131	Former Blackfriars Monastery More images
West Gate	Canterbury	Gatehouse	1380	3 December 1949	TR1459858091; 51°16′53″N 1°04′33″E	1241660	West Gate More images
Wolfson Library	Canterbury	Library	Medieval	7 September 1973	TR1514957959; 51°16′48″N 1°05′01″E	1336826	Wolfson Library More images
22–26, The Cathedral Precincts	Canterbury	Priory bakehouse, brewery and granary	From 15th century	3 May 1967	TR1517658062; 51°16′52″N 1°05′03″E	1085078	22–26, The Cathedral Precincts More images
27 & 28, The Cathedral Precincts	Canterbury	House	15th century to 19th century	3 May 1967	TR1508058095; 51°16′53″N 1°04′58″E	1252947	27 & 28, The Cathedral Precincts More images

== See also ==
- Grade II* listed buildings in City of Canterbury
- Grade I listed buildings in Kent
  - Grade I listed buildings in Ashford (borough)
  - Grade I listed buildings in Dartford (borough)
  - Grade I listed buildings in Dover (district)
  - Grade I listed buildings in Folkestone and Hythe
  - Grade I listed buildings in Gravesham
  - Grade I listed buildings in Maidstone
  - Grade I listed buildings in Medway
  - Grade I listed buildings in Tonbridge and Malling
  - Grade I listed buildings in Tunbridge Wells (borough)
  - Grade I listed buildings in Sevenoaks (district)
  - Grade I listed buildings in Swale
  - Grade I listed buildings in Thanet
