= Grade I listed buildings in Dover (district) =

There are over 9,000 Grade I listed buildings in England. This page is a list of these buildings in the district of Dover in Kent.

== Buildings ==
Name	Location	Type	Completed (Note: The date given is the date used by Historic England as significant for the initial building or that of an important part in the structure's description.)	Date designated	Grid ref. (Note: Sometimes known as OSGB36, the grid reference is based on the British national grid reference system used by the Ordnance Survey.) Geo-coordinates	Entry number (Note: The "List Entry Number" is a unique number assigned to each listed building and scheduled monument by Historic England.)	Image
Church of St Anthony the Martyr	Alkham, Dover	Church	c.1200	22 August 1962	TR2554442365; 51°08′10″N 1°13′21″E	1084358	Church of St Anthony the Martyr More images
Church of St Nicholas	Ash	Parish church	c.1190	11 October 1963	TR2875958384; 51°16′43″N 1°16′43″E	1363280	Church of St Nicholas More images
Richborough Castle	Richborough, Ash	Settlement	AD43	26 November 1987	TR3244460253; 51°17′38″N 1°19′57″E	1363256	Richborough Castle More images
Ratling Court	Ratling, Aylesham	House	Late 15th century	11 October 1963	TR2398153690; 51°14′18″N 1°12′26″E	1363218	Upload Photo
Church of St Mary	Capel-le-Ferne	Parish church	12th century	22 August 1962	TR2571140018; 51°06′54″N 1°13′25″E	1070047	Church of St Mary More images
Church of St Mary in Castro	Dover Castle	Church	c.1020	7 March 1974	TR3262941822; 51°07′42″N 1°19′24″E	1070328	Church of St Mary in Castro More images
Dover Castle	Dover Castle	Castle	c.1155	7 March 1974	TR3247941938; 51°07′46″N 1°19′17″E	1070326	Dover Castle More images
The Roman Pharos	Dover Castle	Tower	AD46	7 March 1974	TR3260441815; 51°07′42″N 1°19′23″E	1258537	The Roman Pharos More images
Church of St Mary the Virgin	Eastry, Dover	Parish church	12th century	11 October 1963	TR3111254777; 51°14′43″N 1°18′36″E	1363287	Church of St Mary the Virgin More images
Eastry Court	Eastry	Archbishop's palace	16th century	13 October 1952	TR3112554816; 51°14′44″N 1°18′37″E	1366610	Eastry Court More images
Fairfield House	Eastry	Cross wing house	Early 15th century	11 October 1963	TR3093954579; 51°14′37″N 1°18′27″E	1070186	Fairfield House More images
Church of St Nicholas	Barfrestone, Eythorne	Church	c.1180	11 October 1963	TR2642550146; 51°12′20″N 1°14′24″E	1070306	Church of St Nicholas More images
Church of St Clement	Knowlton, Goodnestone	Parish church	14th/15th-century origin	11 October 1963	TR2816053353; 51°14′01″N 1°16′01″E	1111748	Church of St Clement More images
Church of the Holy Cross	Goodnestone	Parish church	Late 12th century	11 October 1963	TR2547454583; 51°14′45″N 1°13′45″E	1070258	Church of the Holy Cross More images
Knowlton Court	Knowlton, Goodnestone	House	1585	13 October 1952	TR2810953319; 51°14′00″N 1°15′58″E	1336977	Knowlton Court More images
Church of St Lawrence	Church Hougham, Hougham Without	Parish church	12th century	22 August 1962	TR2782739972; 51°06′49″N 1°15′13″E	1070024	Church of St Lawrence More images
Church of St Mary	Nonington	Parish church	Late 13th century	11 October 1963	TR2530752348; 51°13′33″N 1°13′32″E	1070241	Church of St Mary More images
St Albans Court	Nonington	Country house	1875–78	13 October 1952	TR2635752640; 51°13′41″N 1°14′26″E	1070242	St Albans Court More images
Church of St Augustine	Northbourne	Parish church	12th century	11 October 1963	TR3336452233; 51°13′18″N 1°20′26″E	1264324	Church of St Augustine More images
Church of St Mildred	Preston	Library	Early 13th century	11 October 1963	TR2439160404; 51°17′55″N 1°13′03″E	1376652	Church of St Mildred More images
Church of St Nicholas	Ringwould with Kingsdown	Parish church	12th century	22 August 1966	TR3597448303; 51°11′07″N 1°22′31″E	1070060	Church of St Nicholas More images
Chapel of St Bartholomew	Stone Cross, Sandwich	Chapel	13th century	19 May 1950	TR3304057506; 51°16′09″N 1°20′22″E	1343722	Chapel of St Bartholomew More images
Church of St Clement	Sandwich	Parish church	Latter half of 12th century	19 May 1950	TR3328658006; 51°16′24″N 1°20′36″E	1343695	Church of St Clement More images
Church of St Mary	Sandwich	Church	c.1200	19 May 1950	TR3295158417; 51°16′38″N 1°20′19″E	1069541	Church of St Mary More images
Church of St Peter	Sandwich	Church	13th century	19 May 1950	TR3307458165; 51°16′30″N 1°20′25″E	1343813	Church of St Peter More images
Fisher Gate	Sandwich	Town gate	1384	29 April 1970	TR3328258194; 51°16′30″N 1°20′36″E	1069601	Fisher Gate More images
The Barbican	Sandwich	Gatehouse	Late 14th century	19 May 1950	TR3318058258; 51°16′33″N 1°20′31″E	1069655	The Barbican More images
The Salutation	Sandwich	Manor house	1912	19 May 1950	TR3336658124; 51°16′28″N 1°20′40″E	1069643	The Salutation More images
Church of St Pancras	Coldred, Shepherdswell with Coldred	Parish church	Saxon	22 August 1962	TR2744047594; 51°10′56″N 1°15′11″E	1069988	Church of St Pancras More images
The Belvedere	Waldershare Park, Shepherdswell with Coldred	Belvedere	1725–27	22 August 1962	TR2816047499; 51°10′52″N 1°15′47″E	1051607	The Belvedere More images
Waldershare Park	Waldershare	Country house	1705–12	13 October 1952	TR2896348018; 51°11′08″N 1°16′30″E	1247724	Waldershare Park More images
Church of St Margaret	St Margaret's at Cliffe	Parish church	c.1150	22 August 1966	TR3587744771; 51°09′13″N 1°22′18″E	1101743	Church of St Margaret More images
Church of St James	Staple	Parish church	12th-century origins	11 October 1963	TR2693656641; 51°15′49″N 1°15′05″E	1070137	Church of St James More images
Church of All Saints	West Stourmouth, Stourmouth	Parish church	Saxon	11 October 1963	TR2561662880; 51°19′13″N 1°14′12″E	1203363	Church of All Saints More images
Church of St Andrew	Tilmanstone	Parish church	12th century	11 October 1963	TR3021251470; 51°12′58″N 1°17′42″E	1247778	Church of St Andrew More images
Canon Cottage & the Old Canonry	Wingham	Clergy house	c.1285	13 October 1952	TR2424657401; 51°16′18″N 1°12′48″E	1281551	Canon Cottage & the Old Canonry More images
Church of St Mary	Wingham, Dover	Collegiate church	c.1200	11 October 1963	TR2421257474; 51°16′20″N 1°12′47″E	1070091	Church of St Mary More images
Town Hall and Maison Dieu	Dover	Tower	14th century after 1325	17 December 1973	TR3162541738; 51°07′41″N 1°18′32″E	1069499	Town Hall and Maison Dieu More images

== See also ==
- Grade I listed buildings in Kent
  - Grade I listed buildings in Ashford (borough)
  - Grade I listed buildings in City of Canterbury
  - Grade I listed buildings in Dartford (borough)
  - Grade I listed buildings in Folkestone and Hythe
  - Grade I listed buildings in Gravesham
  - Grade I listed buildings in Maidstone
  - Grade I listed buildings in Medway
  - Grade I listed buildings in Tonbridge and Malling
  - Grade I listed buildings in Tunbridge Wells (borough)
  - Grade I listed buildings in Sevenoaks (district)
  - Grade I listed buildings in Swale
  - Grade I listed buildings in Thanet
- Grade II* listed buildings in Dover (district)
