= Grade I listed buildings in Dartford (borough) =

There are over 9,000 Grade I listed buildings in England. This page is a list of these buildings in the district of Dartford in Kent.

== Listed buildings ==
Name	Location	Type	Completed (Note: The date given is the date used by Historic England as significant for the initial building or that of an important part in the structure's description.)	Date designated	Grid ref. (Note: Sometimes known as OSGB36, the grid reference is based on the British national grid reference system used by the Ordnance Survey.) Geo-coordinates	Entry number (Note: The "List Entry Number" is a unique number assigned to each listed building and scheduled monument by Historic England.)	Image
Church of St Margaret	Darenth, Dartford	Church	10th century	1 June 1967	TQ5608171274; 51°25′08″N 0°14′36″E	1085815	Church of St Margaret More images
Church of St Nicholas	Southfleet	Church	14th century	1 June 1967	TQ6137671163; 51°24′59″N 0°19′10″E	1337465	Church of St Nicholas More images
Church of St Mary	Stone	Parish church	13th century	1 June 1967	TQ5764174810; 51°27′01″N 0°16′02″E	1085810	Church of St Mary More images
Church of St John the Baptist	Sutton-at-Hone and Hawley	Church	Early 14th century	1 June 1967	TQ5532270598; 51°24′47″N 0°13′56″E	1085811	Church of St John the Baptist More images
Parish Church of St Peter and St Paul	Swanscombe and Greenhithe	Parish church	Mainly 13th century	5 May 1952	TQ6046373986; 51°26′32″N 0°18′27″E	1085788	Parish Church of St Peter and St Paul More images
Church of St Michael	Wilmington	Church	Pre-Conquest origins	1 June 1967	TQ5385672469; 51°25′49″N 0°12′43″E	1085789	Church of St Michael More images
Holy Trinity Church	Dartford	Parish church	1220	22 December 1953	TQ5440473996; 51°26′38″N 0°13′13″E	1086029	Holy Trinity Church More images

== See also ==
- Grade I listed buildings in Kent
  - Grade I listed buildings in Ashford (borough)
  - Grade I listed buildings in City of Canterbury
  - Grade I listed buildings in Dover (district)
  - Grade I listed buildings in Folkestone and Hythe
  - Grade I listed buildings in Gravesham
  - Grade I listed buildings in Maidstone
  - Grade I listed buildings in Medway
  - Grade I listed buildings in Tonbridge and Malling
  - Grade I listed buildings in Tunbridge Wells (borough)
  - Grade I listed buildings in Sevenoaks (district)
  - Grade I listed buildings in Swale
  - Grade I listed buildings in Thanet
- Grade II* listed buildings in Dartford (borough)
