= Grade I listed buildings in Kent =

Kent shown within England

The county of Kent is divided into 13 districts. The districts of Kent are Ashford, Canterbury, Dartford, Dover, Gravesham, Maidstone, Medway, Tonbridge and Malling, Tunbridge Wells, Sevenoaks, Shepway, Swale and Thanet.

As there are 435 Grade I listed buildings in the county they have been split into separate lists for each district.

- Grade I listed buildings in Ashford (borough)
- Grade I listed buildings in City of Canterbury
- Grade I listed buildings in Dartford (borough)
- Grade I listed buildings in Dover (district)
- Grade I listed buildings in Folkestone and Hythe
- Grade I listed buildings in Gravesham
- Grade I listed buildings in Maidstone
- Grade I listed buildings in Medway
- Grade I listed buildings in Sevenoaks District
- Grade I listed buildings in Swale
- Grade I listed buildings in Thanet
- Grade I listed buildings in Tonbridge and Malling
- Grade I listed buildings in Tunbridge Wells (borough)

== See also ==
- Grade II* listed buildings in Kent

== See also ==
- Category:Grade I listed buildings in Kent
