= St Mary de Castro =

St Mary de Castro or St Mary in Castro ('St Mary in the Castle') may refer to:

- St Mary sub Castro, Dover, England, a church in the grounds of Dover Castle
- Church of St Mary de Castro, Leicester, England, in the former bailey of Leicester Castle
- Chapel of St Mary de Castro, Chester Castle, England
- St Mary de Castro, Canterbury, England, demolished around 1486, now the site of the White Hart
  - St Mildred's Church, Canterbury (Church of St. Mildred with St. Mary de Castro)
