= Church of St Mary, Chartham =

Coordinates: 51.2559°N 1.0180°E

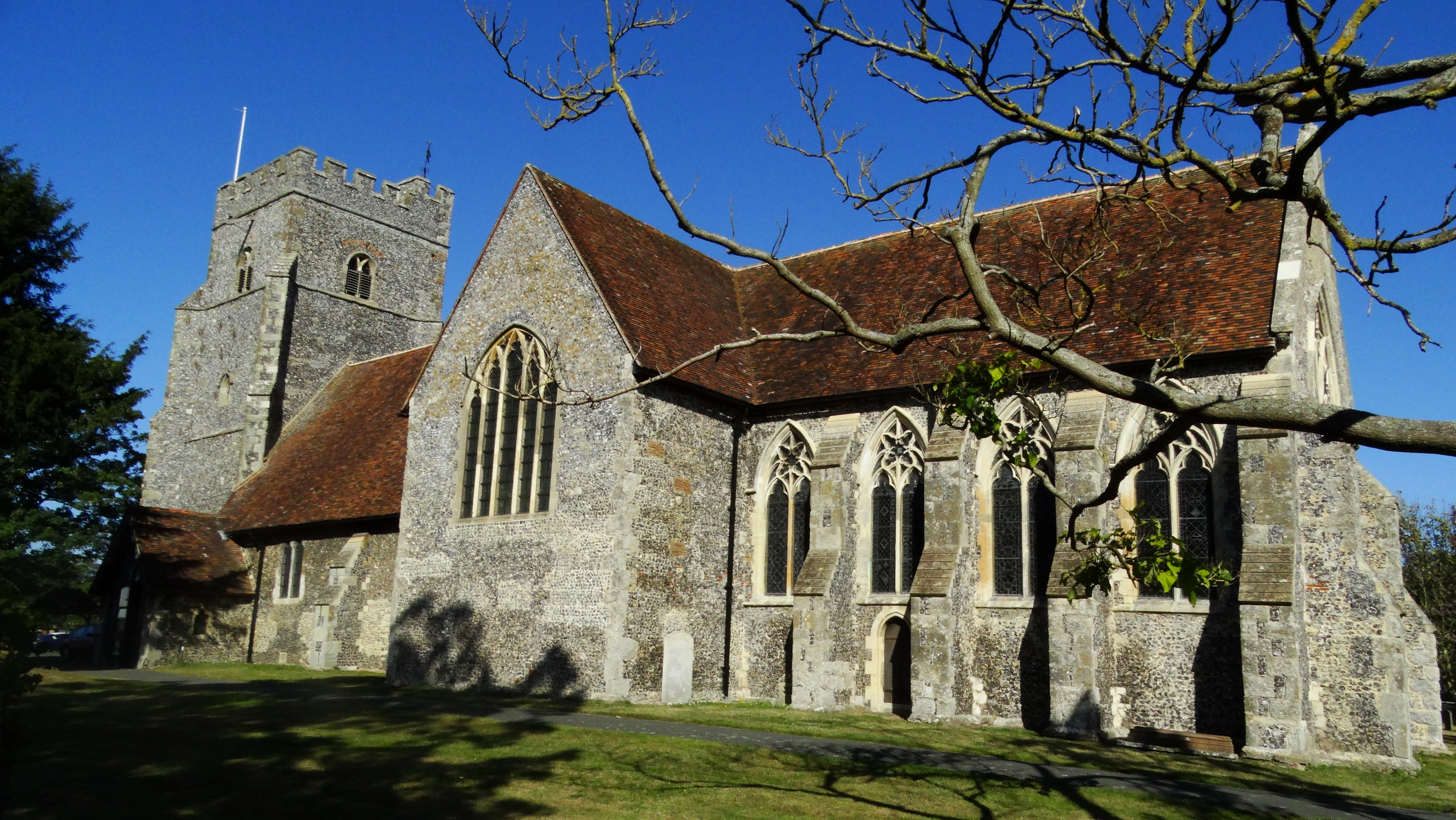
- Church of St Mary, Chartham

- Location in Kent
- OS grid reference: TR 10688 55074
- Location: Chartham, Kent
- Country: England
- Denomination: Anglican

History
- Status: Parish church
- Founded: c. 1285

Architecture
- Functional status: Active
- Heritage designation: Grade I
- Designated: 30 January 1967
- Architectural type: Church
- Completed: 1305

Specifications
- Materials: knapped flint

Administration
- Province: Province of Canterbury
- Diocese: Diocese of Canterbury
- Archdeaconry: Canterbury
- Deanery: West Bridge
- Parish: Chartham

Clergy
- Vicar: Revd Andrew Edwards

St Mary's Church is in the village of Chartham, Kent, England. It is an active Anglican parish church in the Diocese of Canterbury. Constructed between 1285 and circa 1305, with a later tower of the fourteenth century. In 1875, the church was restored by George Edmund Street. St Marys is designated by Historic England as a Grade I listed building.

== History ==
An archaeological survey undertaken in 2010–2011 found evidence of Romano-British and Anglo-Saxon habitation. The present church dates from the late 13th century, with a traditional construction date of 1285. A patent roll dating from the reign of Edward I records the partial remittance of a fine levied on the rector, "towards the works of his church begun by him". The architectural historian John Newman notes that there is strong stylistic evidence to suggest the involvement of Michael of Canterbury, the master mason at Canterbury Cathedral. The tower is later, of the fourteenth century.

The church was restored between 1873 and 1875 by George Edmund Street. It is designated by Historic England as a Grade I listed building.

In 2018, the Commissary General of the Diocese of Canterbury delivered a significant judgement on the installation of closed-circuit television at St Marys. Allowing the application, the Commissary sought to balance public-access requirements, for which CCTV was necessary on security grounds, and the privacy expectations of parishioners. The church remains an active parish church with regular services.

== Architecture and description ==
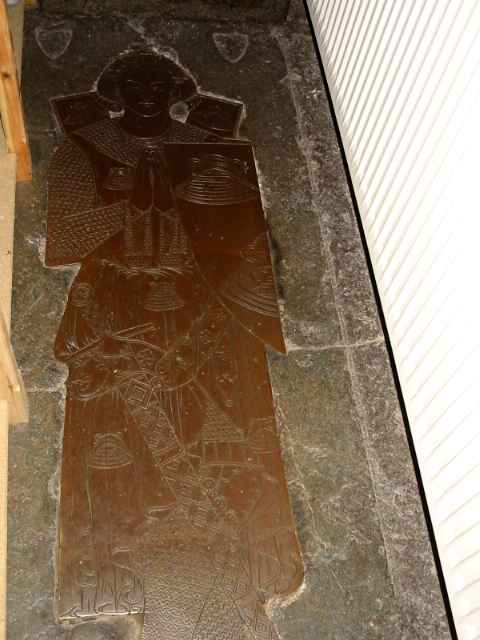
Brass memorial to Sir Robert de Septvans, c.1306

The church is constructed of Kentish knapped flint with ragstone quoins. It is of cruciform design, with nave, transepts, chancel and tower. The church has a number of features of particular note. The nave, transepts and crossing have "a magnificent series of c. 1300 timber roofs with large scissor-trussed rafters." The windows in the chancel are considered amongst the very best examples of Kentish tracery. The stained glass, although "much renewed in 1881 (has) enough glass of c.1294 to guarantee the authenticity of the whole". The brass of the medieval knight, Sir Robert de Septvans, is one of the oldest in the country and "none are more memorable". The church also contains monuments by Rysbrack and Thomas Scheemakers.

== Bibliography ==
- Newman, John (2013). Kent: North East and East. The Buildings of England. New Haven, US and London: Yale University Press. ISBN 9780300185065. OCLC 869127179.
