= Old Palace, Canterbury =

Grade I listed building in England

Coordinates: 51.2803°N 1.0817°E

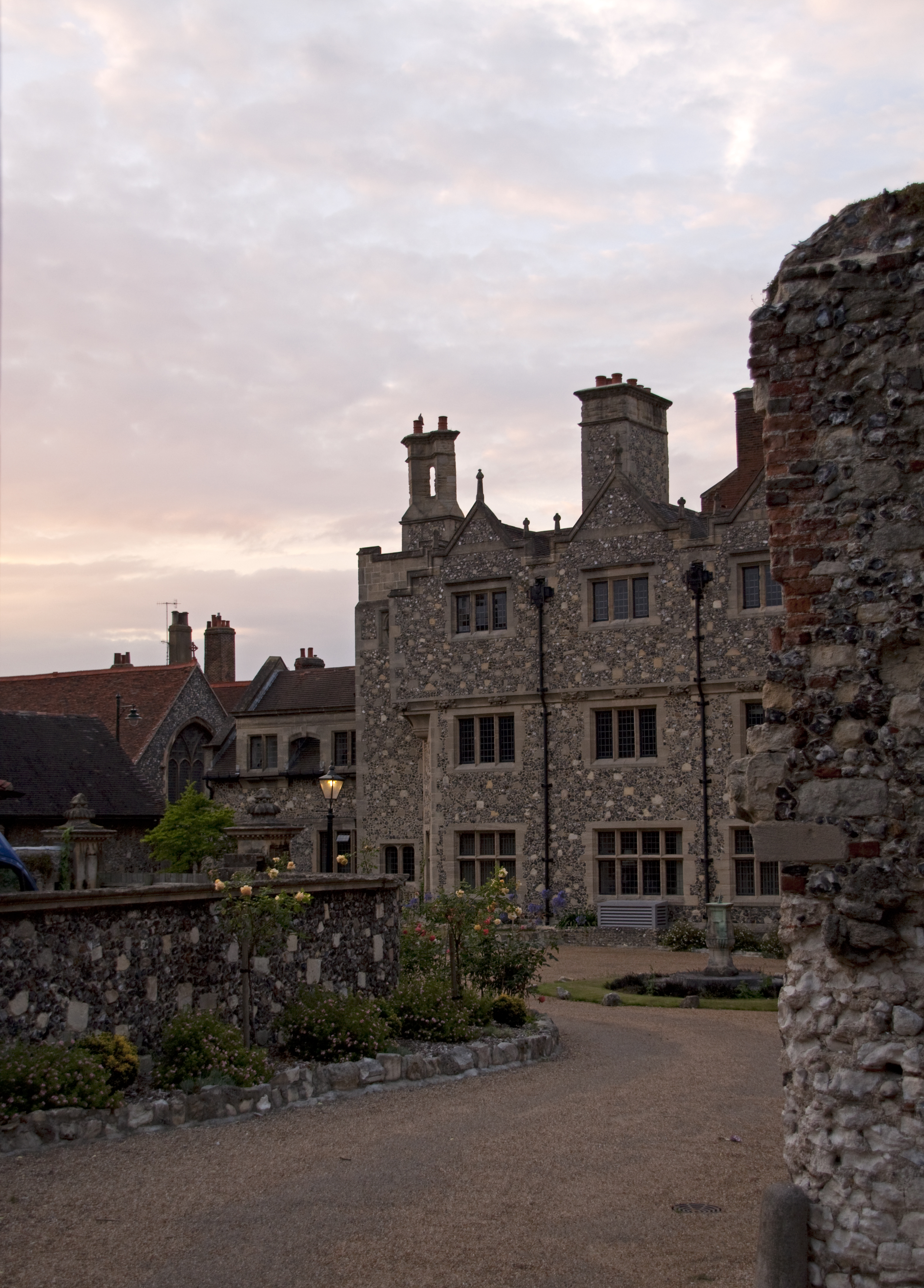
The Old Palace

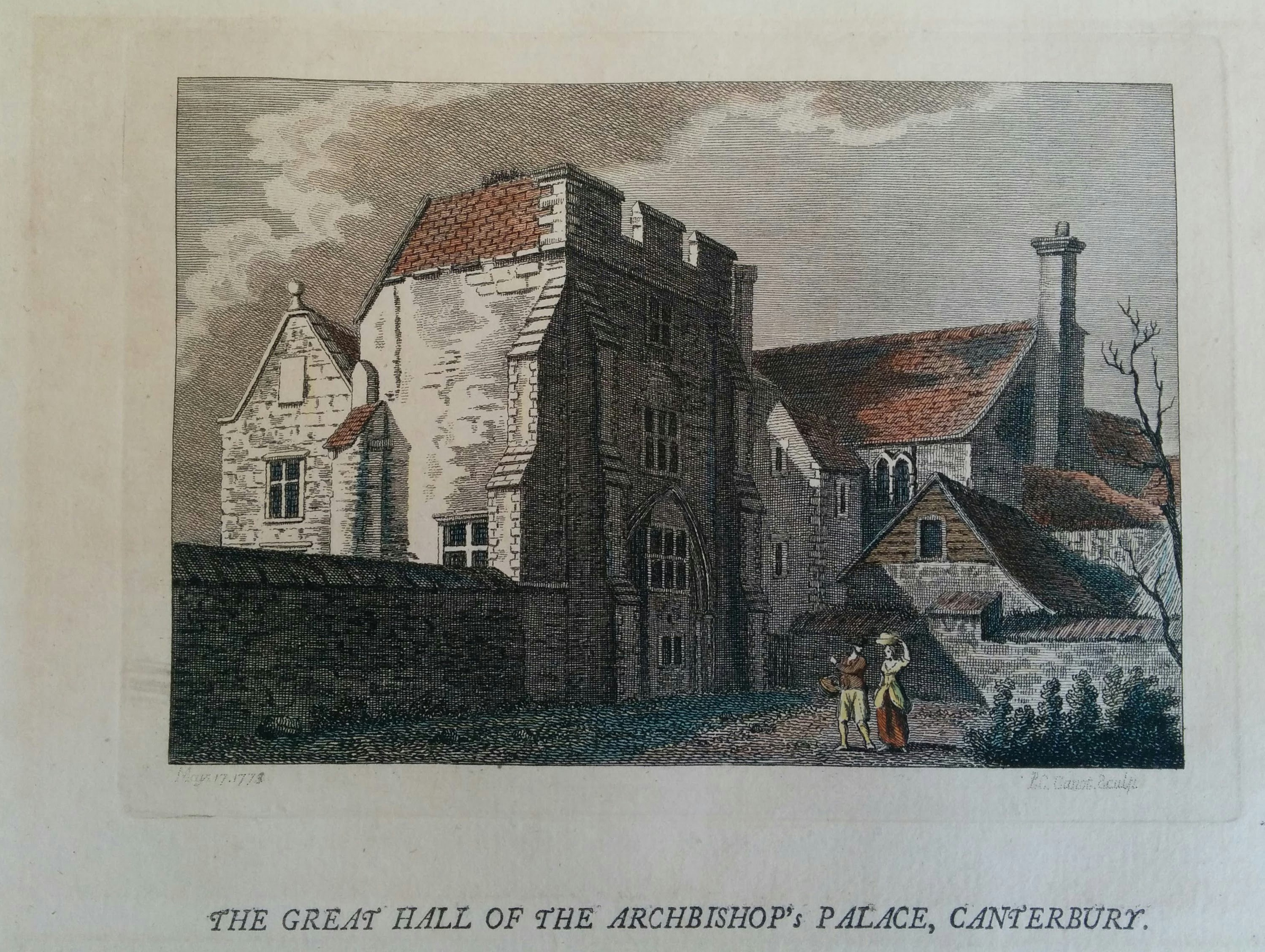
"The Great Hall of the Archbishop's Palace, Canterbury", drawn by Pierre-Charles Canot, published 1773

The Old Palace, also referred to as the Archbishop's Palace, is a historic building situated within the precincts of Canterbury Cathedral. It is the main residence of the Archbishop of Canterbury when in Canterbury.

== Background ==
Built within the grounds of the Cathedral, probably by Lanfranc in the 11th century, the Old Palace was the residence of the Archbishop when he visited Canterbury. The palace was rebuilt between 1193 and 1228. The Great Hall was constructed c 1200-1220 by Archbishops Hubert Walter and Stephen Langton, It was the second largest medieval great hall in Britain after Westminster Hall and was demolished wholsesale in the 1650s. In 1982, an archaeological trench was excavated on the site of the Great Hall.

In 1647, during the English Civil War, the palace was taken over by Parliament along with its estates. Most of the Palace was demolished in the 1650s, and the surviving elements remained empty or little used until the 19th century.

== Restoration ==
The Palace had undergone many modifications and adjustments over the centuries, both before and after its partial demolition.

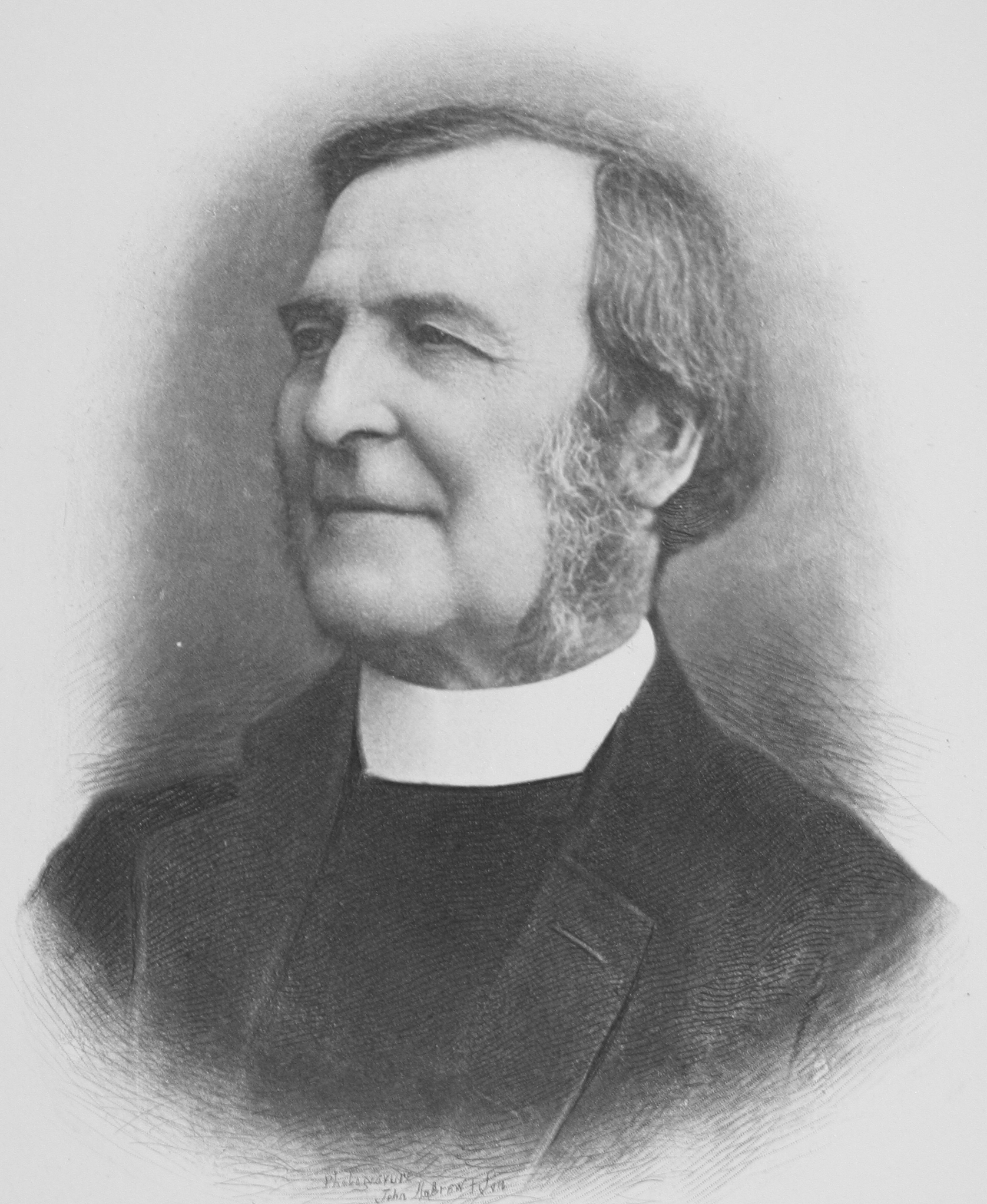
Archbishop Frederick Temple

In 1896, the surviving elements of Old Palace were comprehensively restored and new accommodation added by architect W. D. Caröe. Archbishop Frederick Temple was the first Archbishop to live there since 1647. Caröe's curved three storey building incorporates the west end of the undercroft of the monastic refectory. The south wing contains visible traces of the medieval structure in the buttresses and a 14th-century two-light window. A 16th-century gateway survives but is now blocked. In 2006 the Palace underwent a two-year programme of repair.

=== Current use ===
As well as being the official residence of the Archbishop when in Canterbury, a wing of the building is also the home and office of the Bishop of Dover, a suffragan bishop who (as 'Bishop in Canterbury') carries out most duties of a diocesan bishop for the Diocese of Canterbury to free the Archbishop for wider duties.

== Status ==
The Palace was designated a Grade I listed building on 3 May 1967.

== See also ==
- Grade I listed buildings in City of Canterbury
