= St Vincent of Saragossa Church, Littlebourne =

St Vincent's Church, Littlebourne
- St Vincent of Saragossa
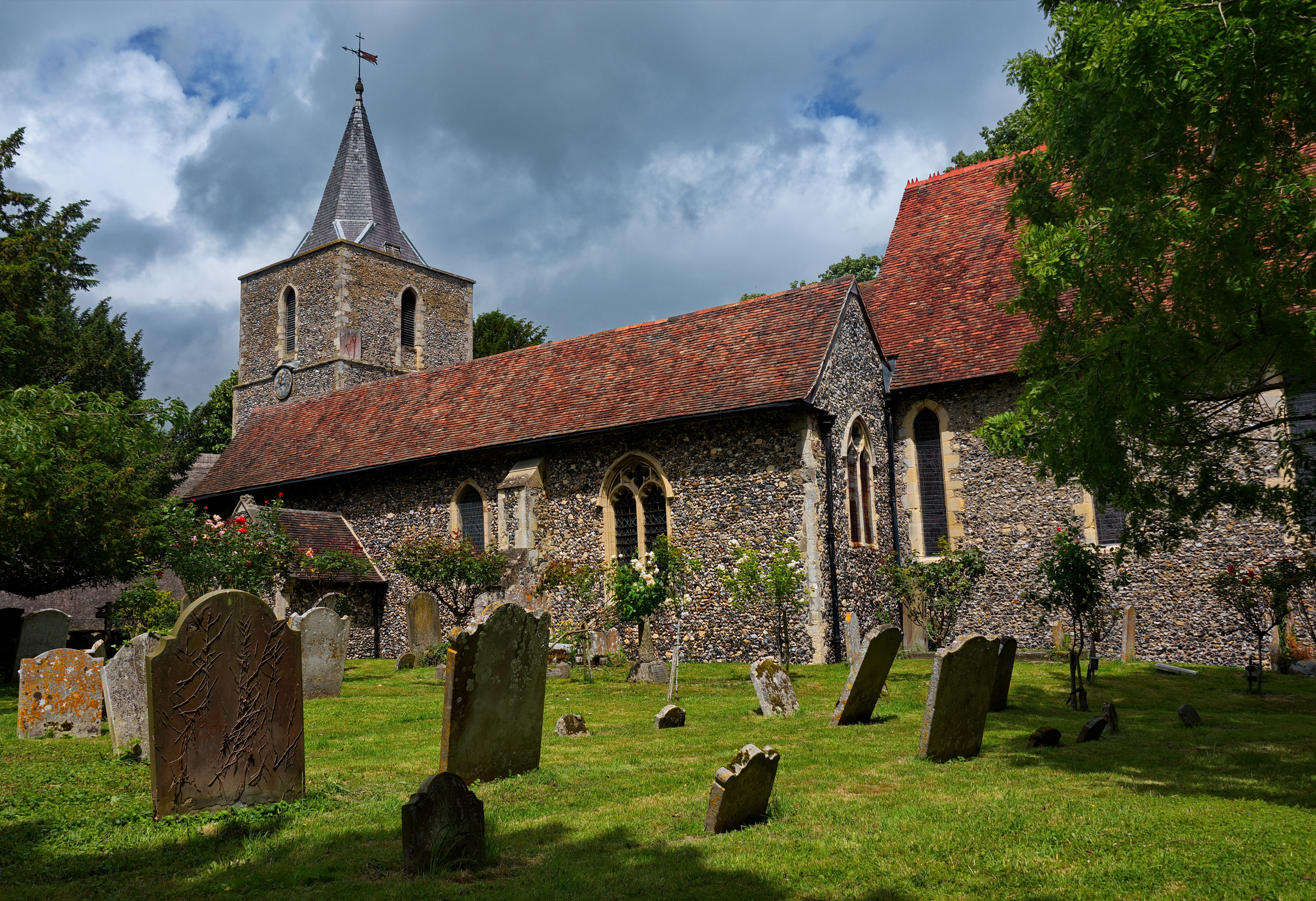
- St Vincent's Church, Littlebourne
- St Vincent's Church, Littlebourne
- 51°16′37″N 1°10′05″E
- OS grid reference: TR 21055 57865
- Location: Littlebourne
- Country: England
- Denomination: Church of England
- Previous denomination: Roman Catholic

History
- Dedication: St Vincent of Saragossa

Architecture
- Heritage designation: Grade I listed building
- Designated: 30 January 1967
- Completed: 13th century

St Vincent of Saragossa's Church is the Church of England parish church of Littlebourne, Kent, England. The parish is part of the Benefice of Littlebourne including Ickham, Wickhambreaux and Stodmarsh. It is a Grade I listed building.

== History ==
The church of St Vincent of Saragossa dates from the 13th century and is thought to have been founded by the monks of St Augustine's Abbey in Canterbury.

Inside the church is an ancient wall painting depicting Saint Christopher, patron saint of travellers. The church also has what is reckoned to be one of the finest collections of stained glass windows in the country designed by Nathaniel Westlake, the leading designer of the Gothic Revival movement in England.
