= St Nicholas Church, Ringwould =

Church in Ringwould, Kent, England

Coordinates: 51.1853°N 1.3753°E

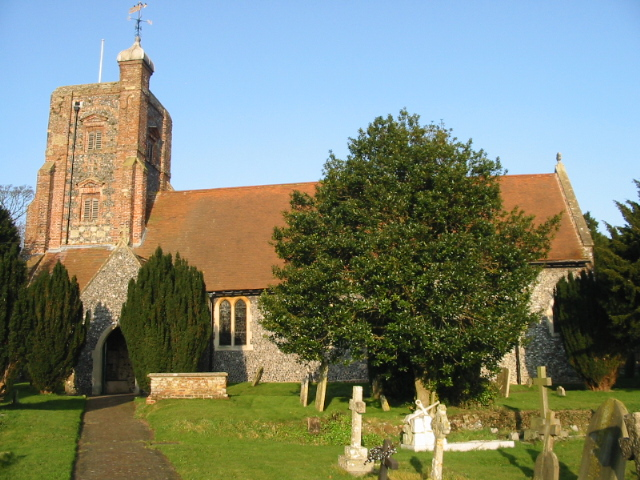
St Nicholas Church, Ringwould

St Nicholas Church is the Church of England parish church of the village of Ringwould in east Kent. A Grade I listed building, it was constructed in the 12th century, with alterations in the 14th century, restorations from the 19th century and a west tower dating to 1628.
