= St Mary's Church, Capel-le-Ferne =

Coordinates: 51.1150°N 1.2235°E

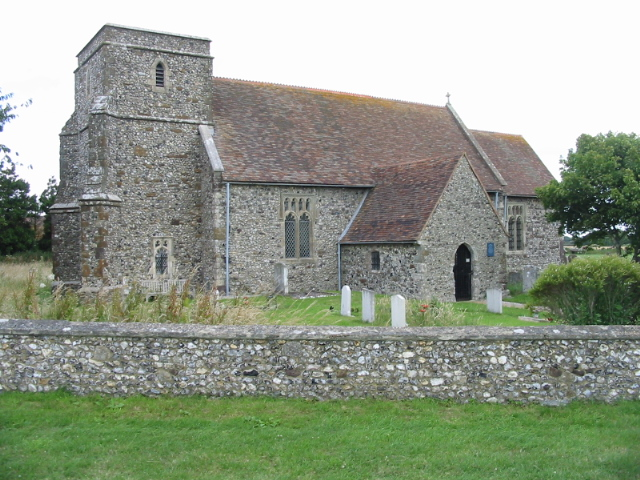
- St Mary's Church, Capel-le-Ferne, from the southwest

- Location in Kent
- OS grid reference: TR 257 400
- Location: Capel-le-Ferne, Kent
- Country: England
- Denomination: Anglican
- Website: Churches Conservation Trust

Architecture
- Functional status: Redundant
- Heritage designation: Grade I
- Designated: 22 August 1962
- Architectural type: Church
- Style: Norman, Gothic

Specifications
- Materials: Flint, tiled roofs

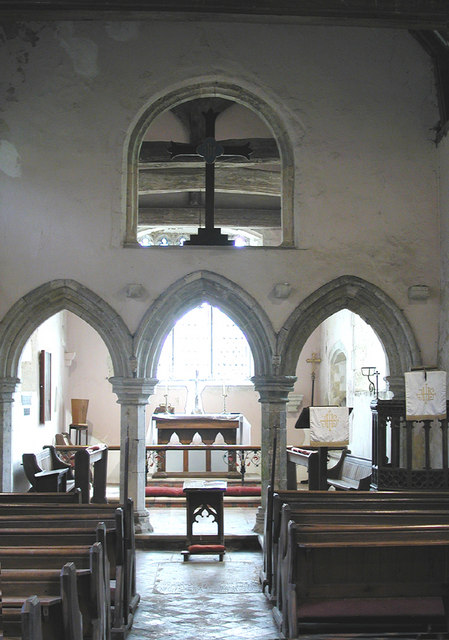
Chancel screen

St Mary's Church is a redundant Anglican church to the northeast of the village of Capel-le-Ferne, Kent, England. It is recorded in the National Heritage List for England as a designated Grade I listed building, and is under the care of the Churches Conservation Trust. The church stands in an isolated position adjacent to Capel Church Farm, to the north of the A20 road and 2 miles (3.2 km) northeast of Folkestone.

== History ==
The church dates from the 12th century. In the following century alterations were made and the tower was added. In the 14th century the chancel screen and porch were built, and most of the windows were added during the 15th century. The church was restored in 1890. It was declared redundant and vested in the Churches Conservation Trust in 1986.

== Architecture ==
=== Exterior ===
St Mary's is constructed in flint with tiled roofs. Its plan consists of a nave, a chancel, a south porch, and a west tower. The tower is in two stages, with a west door, angle buttresses, two string courses, and a plain parapet. In the north wall of the nave is a small 12th-century Norman window and the head of a 14th-century window; otherwise all the windows date from the 15th century.

=== Interior ===
Inside the church, the nave is divided from the chancel by a 14th-century stone screen. In the lower part of the screen is a three-bay arcade with pointed arches carried on octagonal piers. Between and to the sides of the arches are four corbels which formerly supported the rood screen. Above the arcade the screen is pierced by a large round-headed opening which silhouetted the rood cross. This feature is unique in England. On the east and north walls of the chancel are large moulded corbels. Also in the chancel are an aumbry with a semicircular head, a simple sedilia, and a 13th-century trefoil-headed piscina. The font consists of an octagonal bowl carried on an octagonal stem. In the recess of the Norman north window is painted foliage. There are fragments of medieval stained glass in the east window. The memorials include a brass dated 1526, and a white marble wall plaque to General Sir Charles William Dunbar Staveley who died in 1896.

== See also ==
- List of churches preserved by the Churches Conservation Trust in South East England
