= Michael of Canterbury =

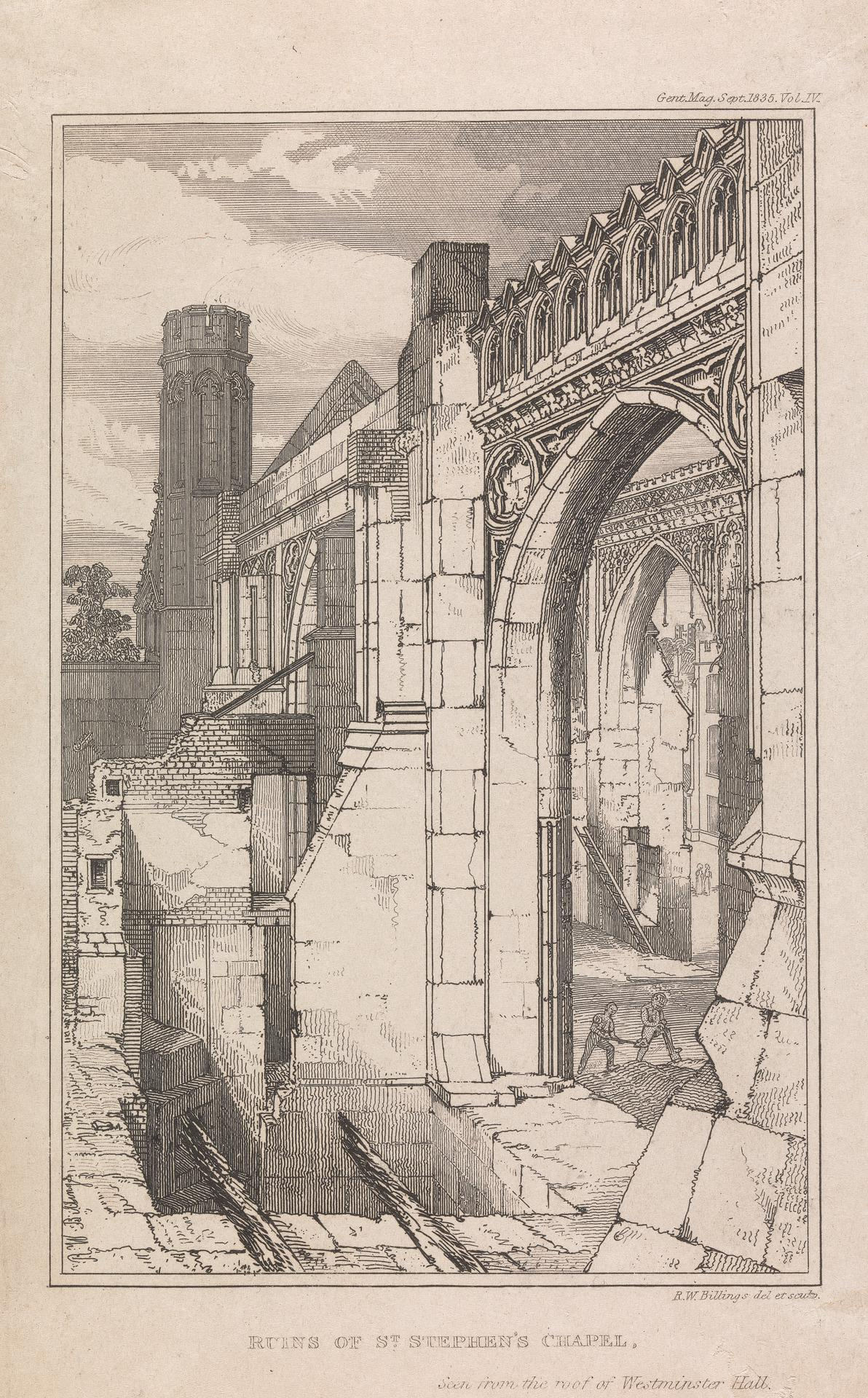
The ruins of St Stephen's Chapel after it was destroyed by fire in 1834.

Michael of Canterbury (fl. 1275 – 1321) was an English Gothic master mason responsible for work at Canterbury Cathedral and St Stephen's Chapel, at the Palace of Westminster. He also designed the Cheapside Eleanor Cross. His work at Canterbury may have included the two major projects of Prior Eastry: the choir screens (c.1298) and the remodelling of the chapter house (c.1304). He may also have designed the Peckham tomb (c.1292).

Architectural historian John Harvey credited Michael with the introduction of the ogee arch to English Gothic architecture; this was a significant feature in the English Curvilinear Decorated, French Flamboyant and English Perpendicular styles.

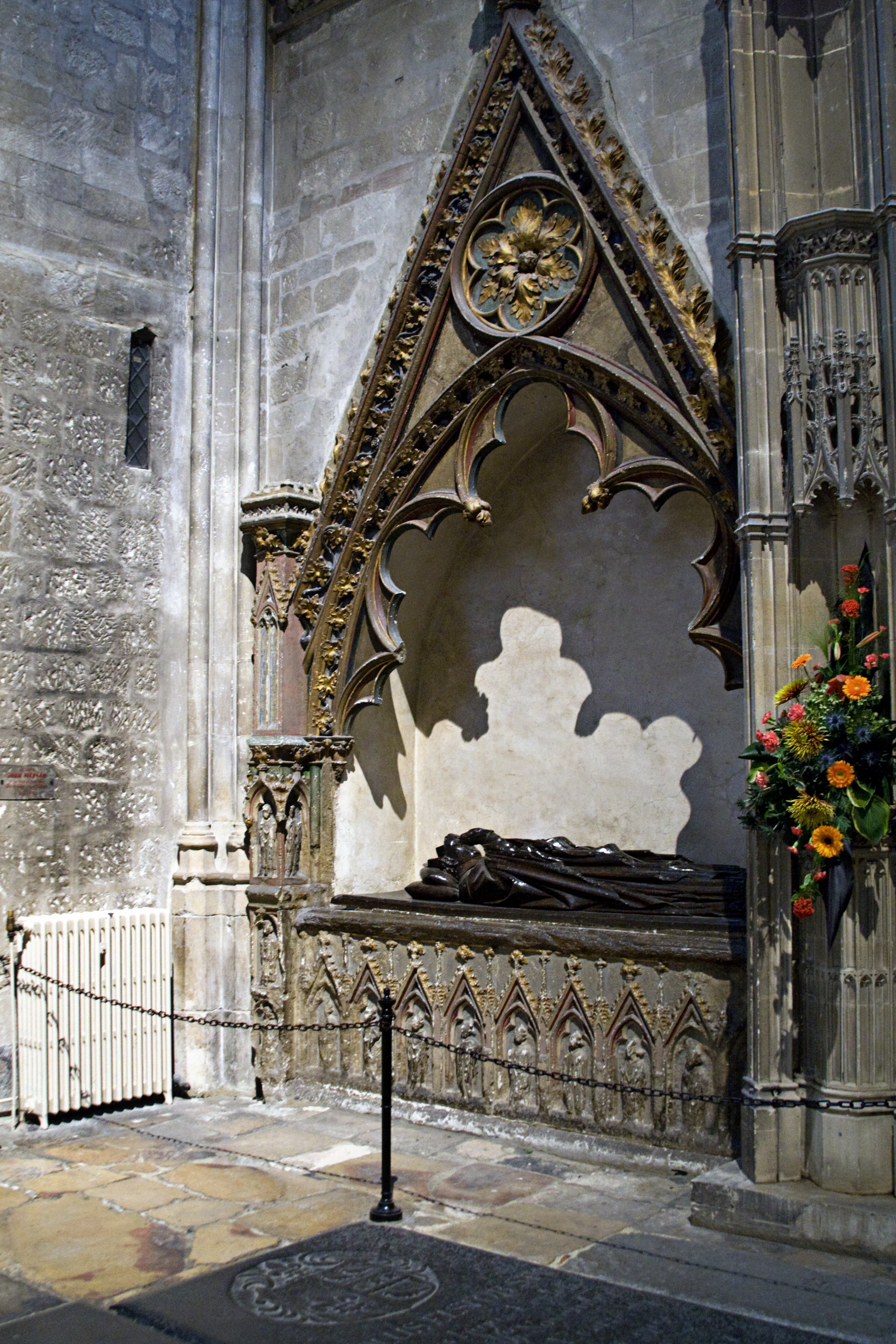
The Peckham tomb at Canterbury

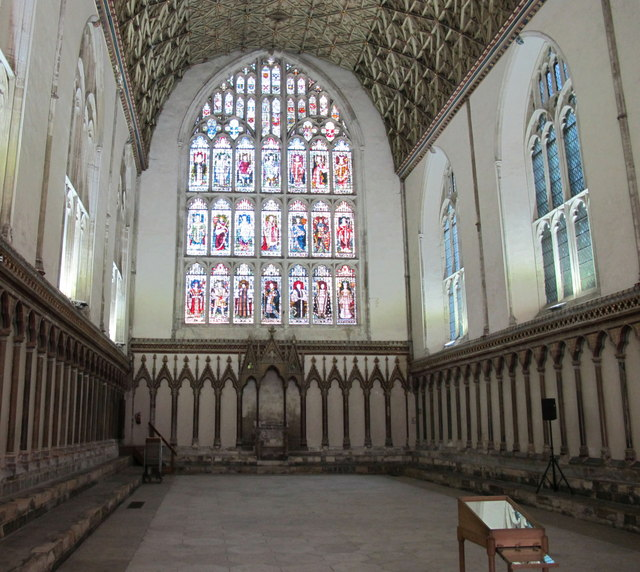
The chapter house at Canterbury. The windows and ceiling are later.

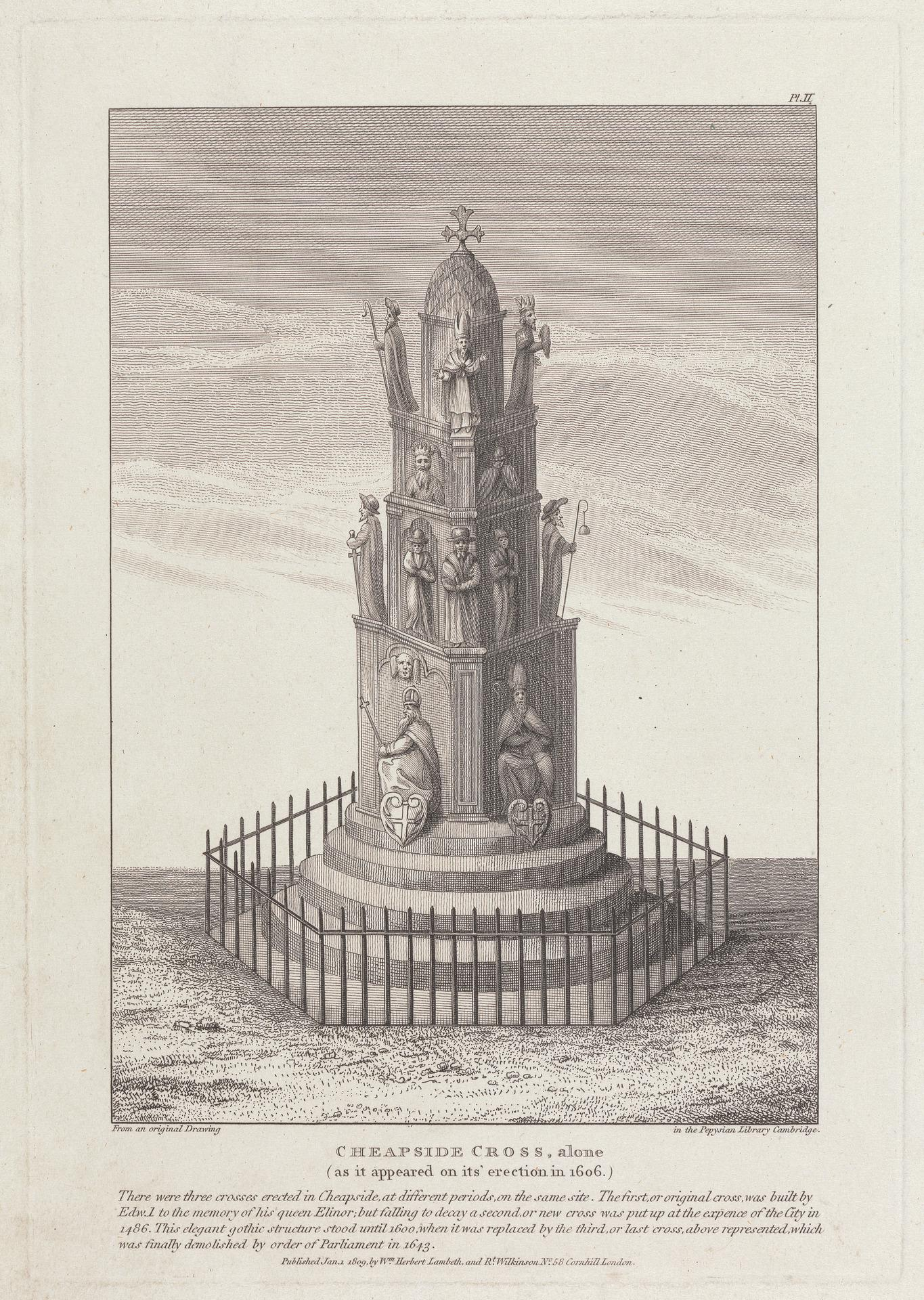
The Cheapside Eleanor Cross

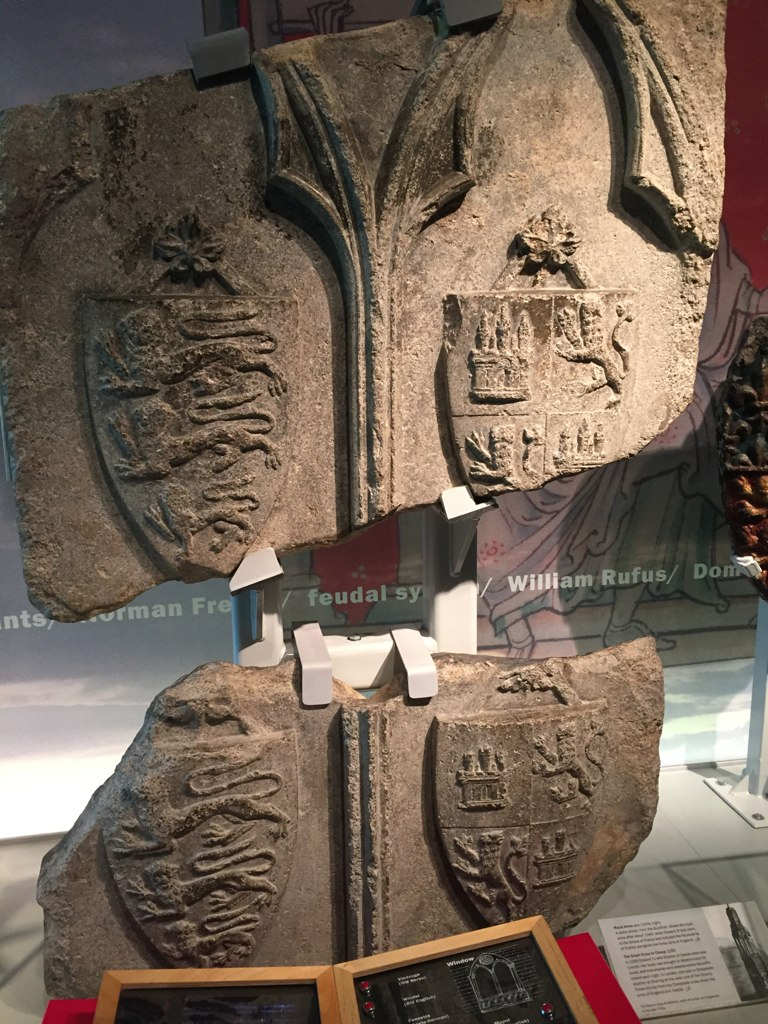
Surviving fragments of the Cheapside cross

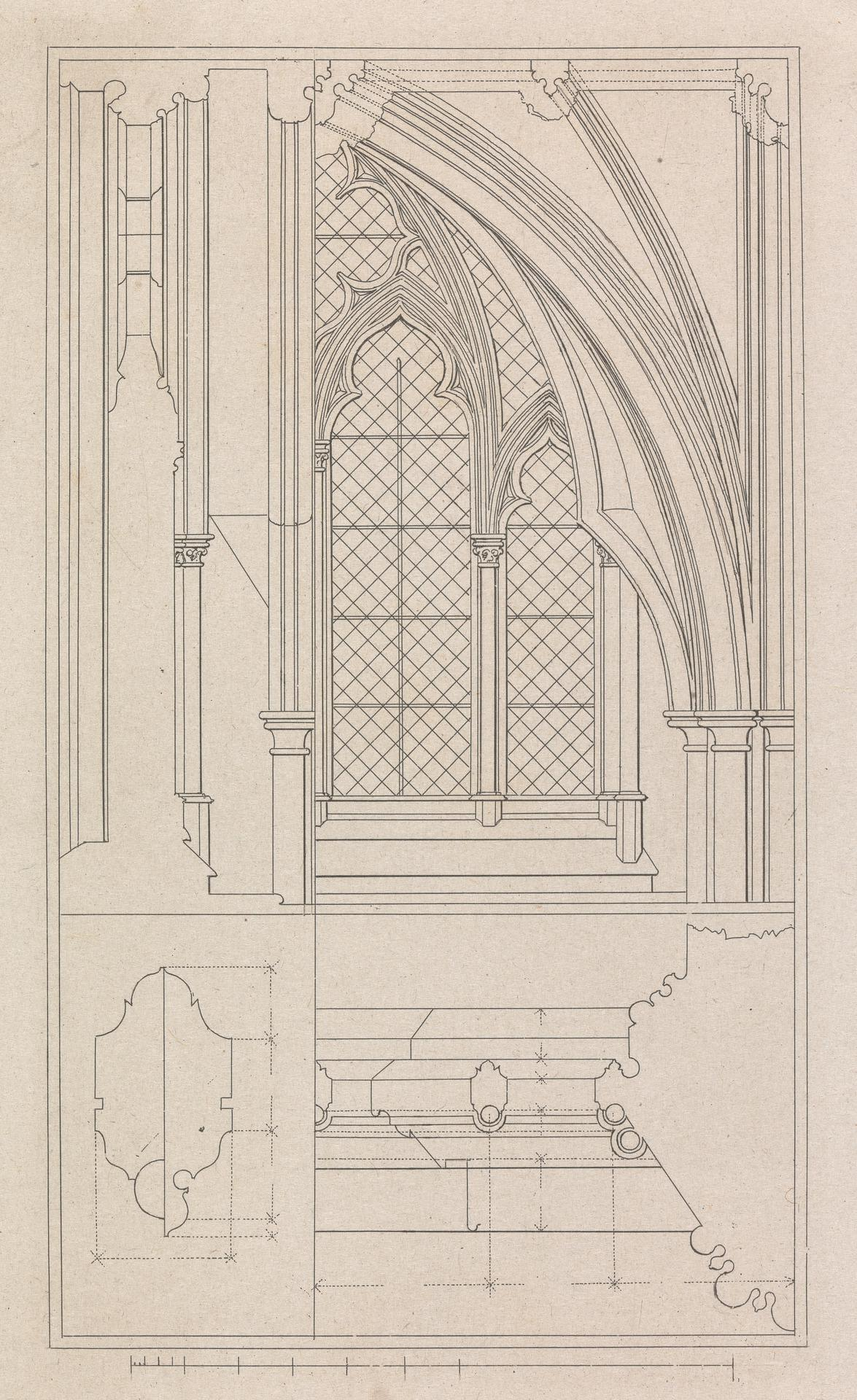
Details of the crypt of St Stephen's Chapel
