= Church of St Mary the Virgin, Fordwich =

Coordinates: 51.2958°N 1.1271°E

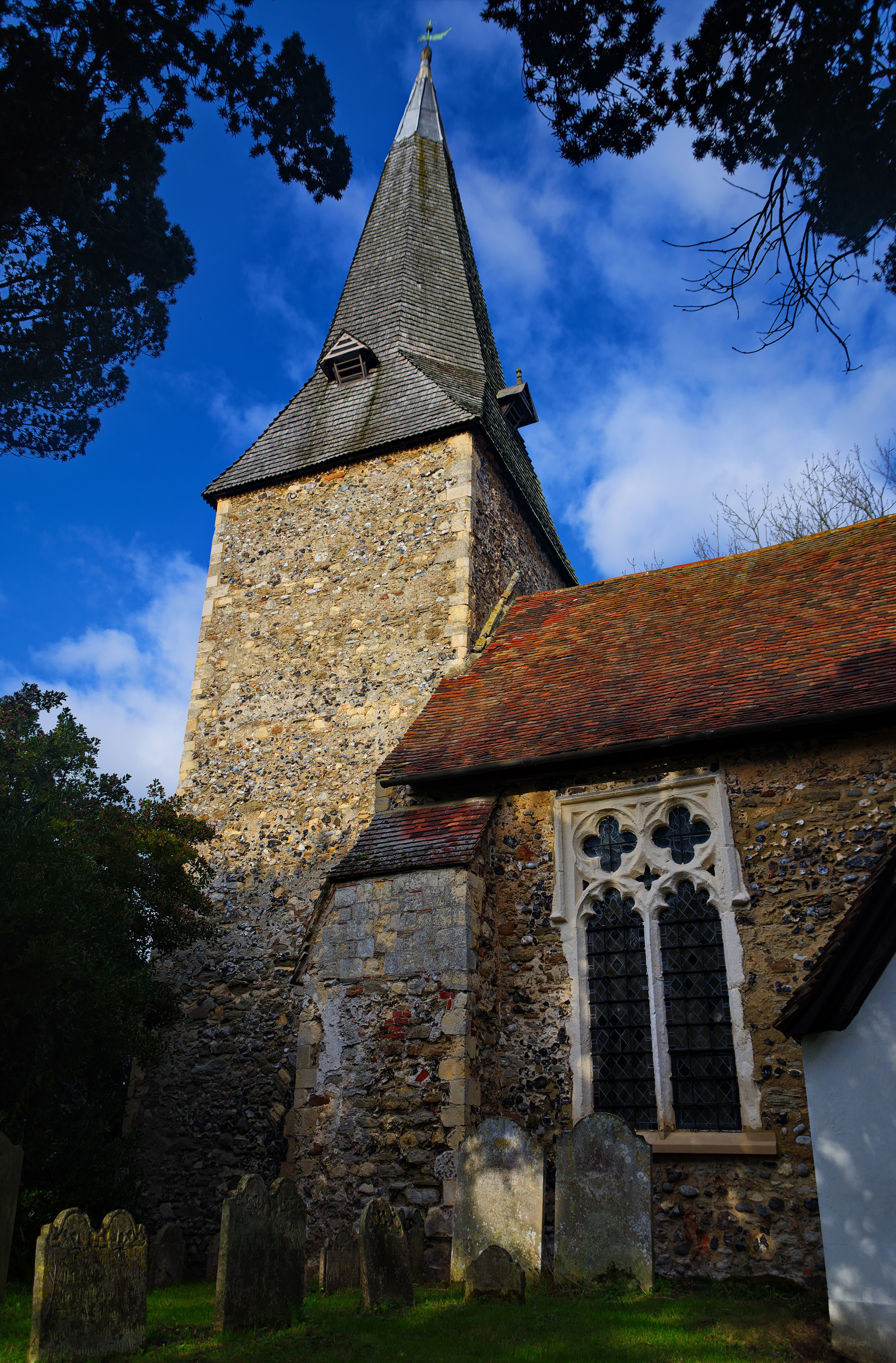
- Tower of the Church of St Mary the Virgin, Fordwich

- Location in Kent
- OS grid reference: TR 181 598
- Location: Fordwich, Kent
- Country: England
- Denomination: Anglican
- Website: Churches Conservation Trust

Architecture
- Functional status: Redundant
- Heritage designation: Grade I
- Designated: 30 January 1967
- Architectural type: Church
- Style: Anglo-Saxon, Norman, Gothic

Specifications
- Materials: Ragstone, flint and brick Roofs tiled

The Church of St Mary the Virgin is a redundant Anglican church in the small town of Fordwich, Kent, England. It is recorded in the National Heritage List for England as a designated Grade I listed building, and is under the care of the Churches Conservation Trust. The church stands near to the centre of Fordwich, some 3 miles (5 km) northeast of Canterbury.

== History ==
The church dates from the Norman era. Some Anglo-Saxon material is present in the nave. The chancel and north aisle were added in the 12th century. During the following century the chancel was extended and the west tower was built. In the 14th century the windows in the south wall of the church were inserted. Box pews were added to the interior in the 18th century, and the church was floored with tiles. The church closed in 1995, and was vested in the Churches Conservation Trust on 5 December 1996.

== Architecture ==
=== Exterior ===
St Mary's is constructed in a mixture of ragstone and other types of stone, flint, and brick, and is partly rendered. The roofs are tiled. Its plan consists of a nave with a north aisle and a south porch, a chancel, and a west tower. The tower is surmounted by a shingled broach spire. The porch is timber-framed. There are two narrow Anglo-Saxon windows in the north aisle, and a three-light window dating from 1503. In the chancel are two 13th-century windows, and a larger window from the 15th century. The windows in the nave have quatrefoil heads.

=== Interior ===
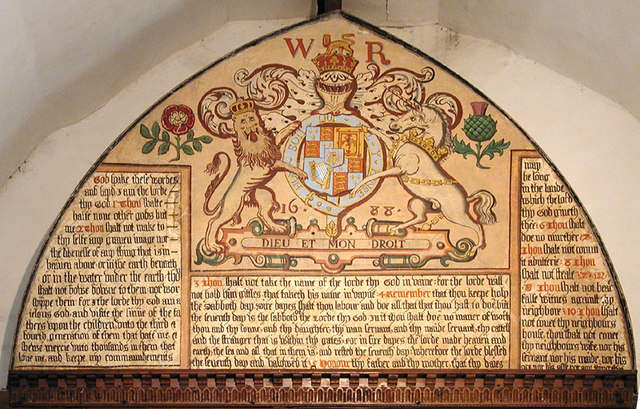
The Royal Arms on display in the chancel. W R for William but surmounted on the Arms of the deposed James II

The ground under the arcade between the nave and the aisle has settled, causing the arcade to lean. In the base of the tower is a bread shelf. The 18th-century box pews are still in the church. In the northeast corner of the nave is the civic pew which contains a wrought iron stand to hold the mayor's mace. Above this pew is a cartouche carrying the Cinque Port Arms. The large font stands between the nave and the aisle. It is Norman in style and carved with blank arcading. It is constructed in Bethersden marble and has a 17th-century cover. Over the chancel arch are the 1688 Royal arms of James II. On each side of the east window are boards inscribed with the Ten Commandments and the Lord's Prayer. The stained glass in the east window dates from the 20th century. It was designed by Martin Travers, and commemorates a rector of the church who died in 1931. The windows in the nave contain medieval stained glass depicting the Coronation of the Virgin, the Virgin and Child, and the emblems of Saint Mark and Saint Luke. In the nave is a brass dated 1605. There are three hatchments in the church, two of them dating from the 17th century. The single-manual organ was made by G. M. Holdich, and rebuilt in 1899 by Browme. Formerly in St Martin's Church, Canterbury, it was moved here in 1908. There is a ring of four bells. They were all cast by Joseph Hatch, one in 1624, and the other three in 1633. The bells are no longer ringable.

== Fordwich stone ==
In the north aisle is a large block of limestone standing about 5.5 feet (1.7 m) high, carved to give the appearance of a tomb. It dates from about 1100, and is considered to be the former shrine of a saint. It is not known how long it had been in the church but it was removed from the church to Canterbury Cathedral in 1760, and returned to Fordwich in 1877. It is considered that it may have been part of the shrine of Saint Augustine of Canterbury.

== See also ==
- List of churches preserved by the Churches Conservation Trust in South East England

Media related to St Mary's church, Fordwich at Wikimedia Commons
