= Greyfriars, Canterbury =

Former Franciscan convent in Kent, England

Coordinates: 51°16′44″N 1°04′37″E

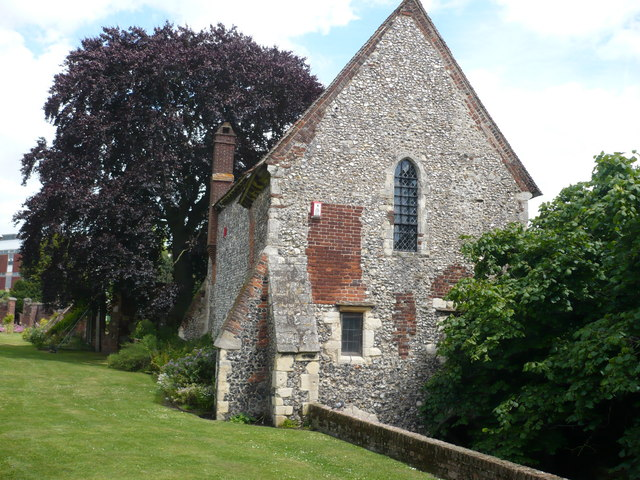
Greyfriars Chapel

Greyfriars in Canterbury was the first Franciscan friary in England.

== History ==
The first Franciscans arrived in the country in 1224 (during the lifetime of the Order's founder St Francis of Assisi) and the friary was set up soon afterwards. The Order of Friars Minor or ‘Greyfriars’ were so named because their habit was of grey cloth with the traditional belt of rope with three knots symbolising their vows of poverty, chastity and obedience. Vowed to poverty, the Order made a point of living in the meanest of buildings. However, by 1250, they recognised the practical need for land and buildings to sustain themselves. Beginning in 1267, the Canterbury house was rebuilt in stone, supported by the donation of land by Alderman John Digge, a former Bailiff of Canterbury. From here, the friary was erected, with the great Church within the friary consecrated by Archbishop Walter Reynolds in 1325.

In 1498 the Canterbury house was formally confirmed as a province of the newly established Observant Franciscans, a reformed, more rigorous branch of the order introduced to England in the previous decade. This building fell under the patronage of King Henry VII of England.

Under his son, Henry VIII, however, the brothers of Greyfriars suffered because of their unwillingness to accept the Royal Supremacy over the newly established Church of England. In 1534, several brothers of the Greyfriars Friary were imprisoned, and two (plus the Warden of the Observant Friary of Canterbury, Richard Risby) were executed for refusing the terms of the Act of Supremacy and lending support to the anti-Reformation mystic Elizabeth Barton. The ‘Holy Maid of Kent’ was a visionary nun that had denounced Henry VIII's divorce from Catherine of Aragon and his remarriage to Anne Boleyn. In December 1538, the Bishop of Dover, Richard Yngworth (or Ingworth), received in the King's name the surrender of all the Canterbury friaries with their lands and property. The remaining friars, having promised ‘not to follow hensforth the supersticious tradicions of ony foryncicall potentate or peere’, were given five shillings apiece and dispersed.

Excavations seeking to detect the precise location of the friary buildings, and determine the layout of the Franciscan buildings, have continued through the twentieth century, and are of great historical interest today.

Elements still visible above ground include the surviving 13th-century building spanning the river (variously interpreted as a guest house or warden's lodging, and known as the Greyfriars Chapel today); the remnants of the friary church incorporated into the eastern boundary of the Franciscan Gardens site; and part of a stone bridge across the main river channel, along with the stone revetments upstream of it. The foundations of the chancel have been revealed in excavations, as have those of an attached structure to the north, believed to be a Lady Chapel, and of a detached structure interpreted as a bell-tower. The location of a second bridge and the friary's lay brothers’ cemetery has also been confirmed. Franciscan friaries typically also comprised a refectory, dormitory, chapter house, study, library and infirmary, but the precise arrangement of the domestic ranges at Canterbury is uncertain; both west and south ranges are believed to have been extended outside the quadrangle at some point after 1275.

== Greyfriars House ==
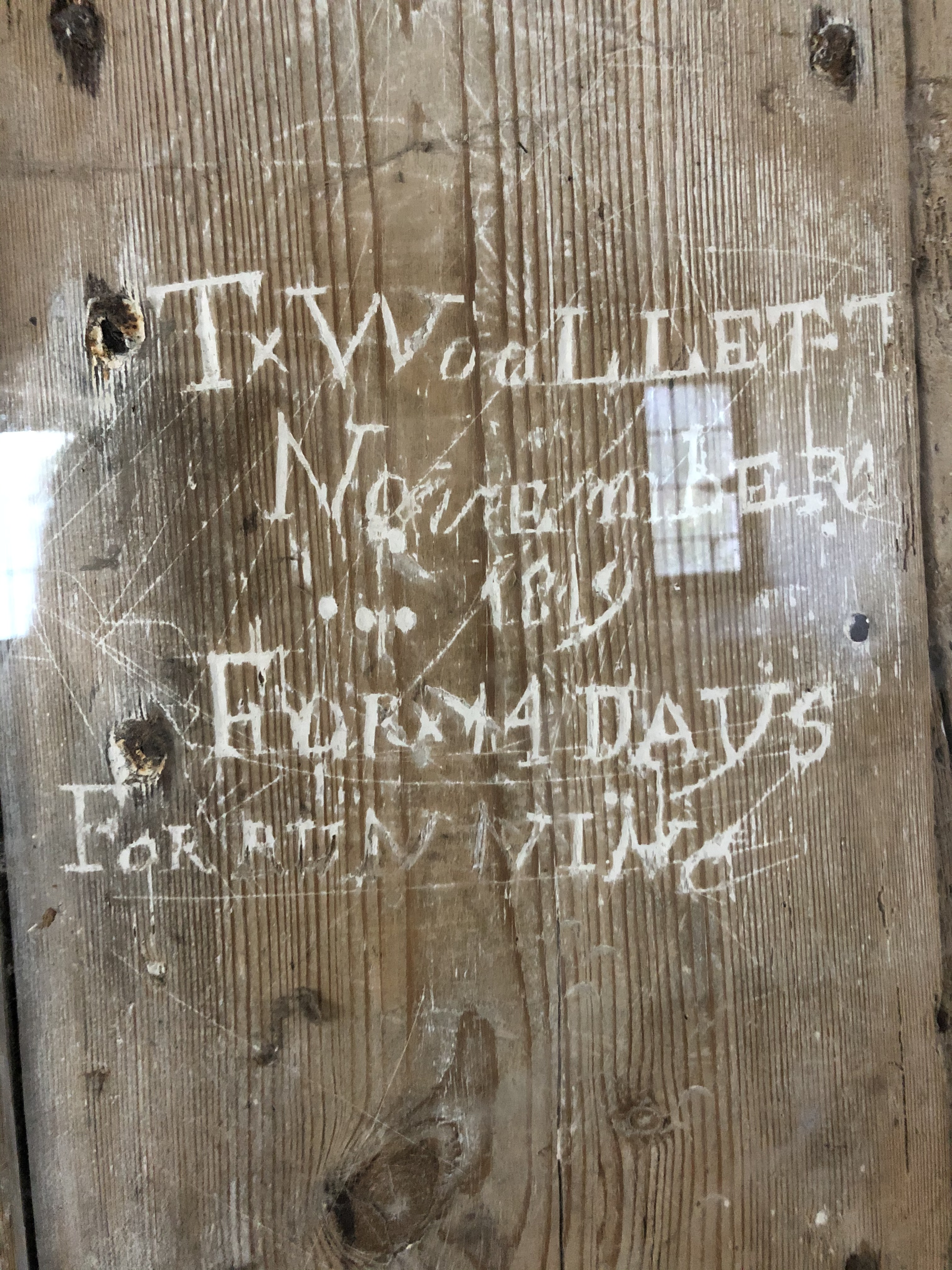
T.Woollett November 1819 For 14 Days For Running

After the Dissolution, the Canterbury friary was surrendered to Richard Ingworth, an agent of Thomas Cromwell and later Bishop of Dover. The property was sold to Thomas Spylman (one of the Court of Augmentations officers responsible for disposing of former church property) for £100, who turned it into a private house. The next owner, Thomas Rolfe, made considerable alterations to the land, and on his death bequeathed his estate to the executors of his will, William Lovelace (MP) and John Dudley. After Rolfe's widow contested the will, and ownership was decided by the probate courts, the original will was ruled legal, and by 1566, the property was acquired by the Lovelace family. All that remains of the buildings as they stood in the Lovelace family's time is a single wall, across the river from the restored guesthouse (now known as Greyfriars Chapel). The Greyfriars House property remained in private hands for centuries.

It is believed that one room of the guesthouse building, now Greyfriars Chapel, was used as a temporary prison cell in the late eighteenth century for inmates due for transportation. To this day, the names of inmates and dates of incarceration are carved into the wooden walls of the cell, including ‘T Woollett, November 1819, for 14 days for running’.

In the nineteenth century, the grounds were used as a tea garden, and from 1914 to 1994, as a market garden with public access. The market garden was an important Canterbury business in the hands of the well-known Smith family. Derek Smith, the last family member to work in the business, was born in Assisi Cottage, a small residence within the Franciscan Gardens.

== Greyfriars Chapel ==
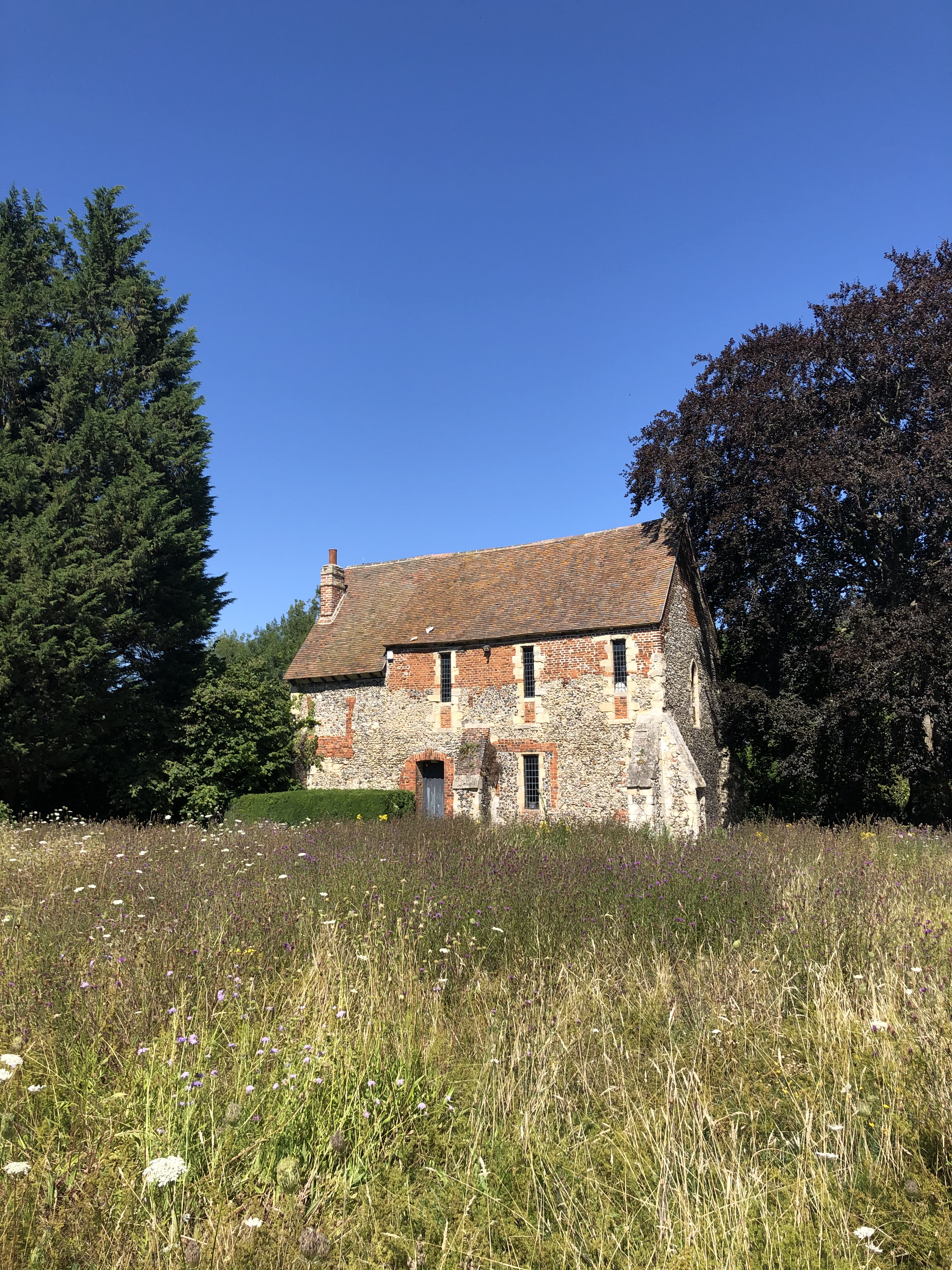
Greyfriars Chapel

In 1919, Major HG James, the owner of the Greyfriars estate, attempted to restore the single surviving building from the estate to its original form, and commissioned some excavation of the grounds. This building was the former guesthouse, which is now known as the Greyfriars Chapel.

This was modernised by Dr John Burgon Bickersteth and Harry Jackman QC in the mid-twentieth century, developing the upper rooms into a vestry and chapel. This renovation was completed in memory of Julian Bickersteth, Archdeacon of Maidstone from 1942 to 1958.

In 1958, the Greyfriars estate and Franciscan Gardens were purchased by the Dean and Chapter of Canterbury Cathedral.

== Today ==
In 2000, the Greyfriars Chapel and Franciscan Gardens were sold to the Eastbridge Hospital of St Thomas the Martyr, Canterbury, who currently oversee the everyday maintenance of the building, and the weekly services in the chapel. Surrounded by the Franciscan Gardens, it is a haven of peace in the middle of a bustling city.

== Sources ==
- Eastbridge Hospital of St Thomas the Martyr official website. http://www.eastbridgehospital.org.uk/explore/greyfriars-chapel/
- The Will of Thomas Rolfe, available through the National Archives. https://discovery.nationalarchives.gov.uk/details/r/D957554
- Canterbury Archaeological Trust Big Dig information. http://www.canterburytrust.co.uk/learning/resources/the_big_dig/
- The Order of Friars Minor Convectual of Great Britain and Ireland website. https://www.thegreyfriars.org
