= Church of St Margaret of Antioch, Darenth =

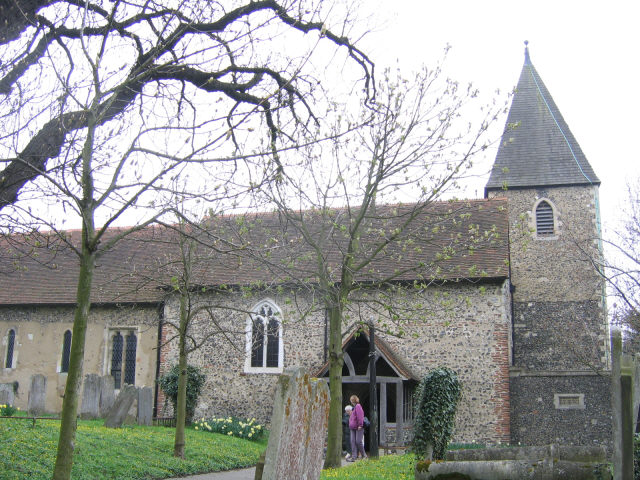
- St Margaret of Antioch
- Church of St Margaret of Antioch, Darenth
- 51.4190°N 0.2433°E
- OS grid reference: TQ 56081 71274
- Location: Darenth, Kent
- Country: England
- Denomination: Church of England

History
- Status: Grade I listed

Architecture
- Years built: 10th–14th centuries, with 19th-century restorations

Administration
- Diocese: Rochester

Clergy
- Vicar: Revd. Nicholas Williams

The Church of St Margaret of Antioch at Darenth, Kent, is a church with Norman origins thought to be the third oldest in Kent and the sixth oldest in the United Kingdom. It is a Grade I listed building.

The chancel and nave are late 10th century or early 11th century. The sanctuary is early 12th century. The church was restored twice in the 19th century, first by William Burges in 1866-68 and then by Ewan Christian in 1888. Newman describes the church as "important, but visually rather charmless."
