= Shed Number 78, Sheerness Dockyard =

Building in Sheerness, Kent, England

Coordinates: 51.4445°N 0.7454°E

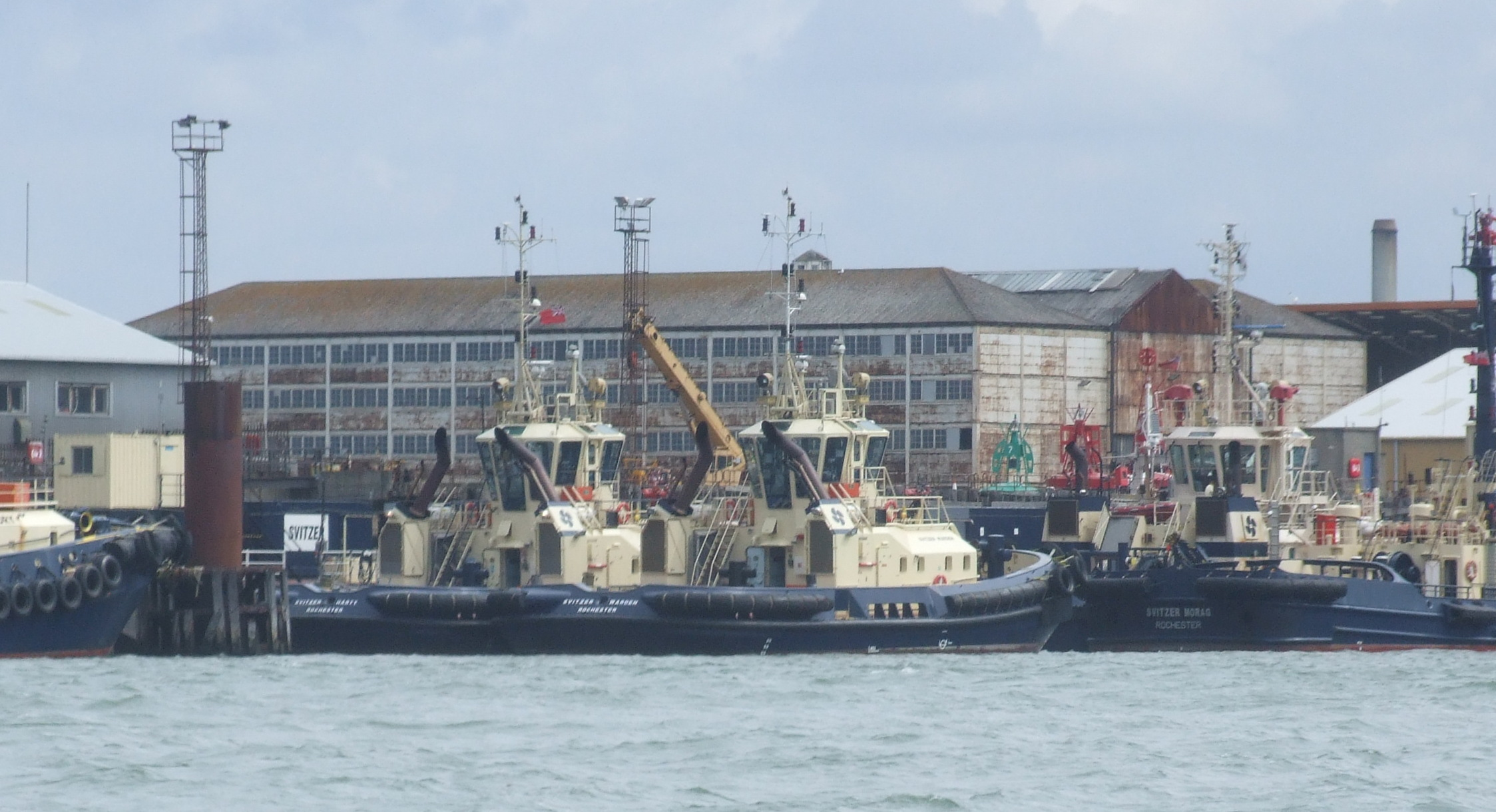
View of Shed Number 78 at Sheerness Dockyard, from the River Medway

Shed Number 78, Sheerness Dockyard (also known as Boat Store Building Number 78 or simply Sheerness Boat Store) is a disused industrial building at Sheerness Dockyard, on the Isle of Sheppey in north Kent. The building was constructed at the Royal Navy Dockyard in Sheerness in 1856–60, as a store for small boats and a warehouse. It became a listed building in 1962, upgraded to Grade I in 1999, but it has been on the Heritage at Risk Register for many years.

== History ==
The building was commissioned by the Admiralty Works Department and constructed under the direction of Colonel Godfrey Thomas Green CB of the Royal Engineers (1807-1886), formerly of the Bengal Sappers and Miners and later Director of Admiralty Works, along with William Scamp (1801-1872). The ironwork was cast by Henry Grissell's Regent's Canal Ironworks. Its design drew inspiration from the slip covers erected at naval dockyards in the 1830s and 1840s—such as the Grade I listed covered slips at Chatham Dockyard—but unlike those earlier structures, it achieves stability through the rigidity of its iron frame joints rather than relying on traditional bracing.

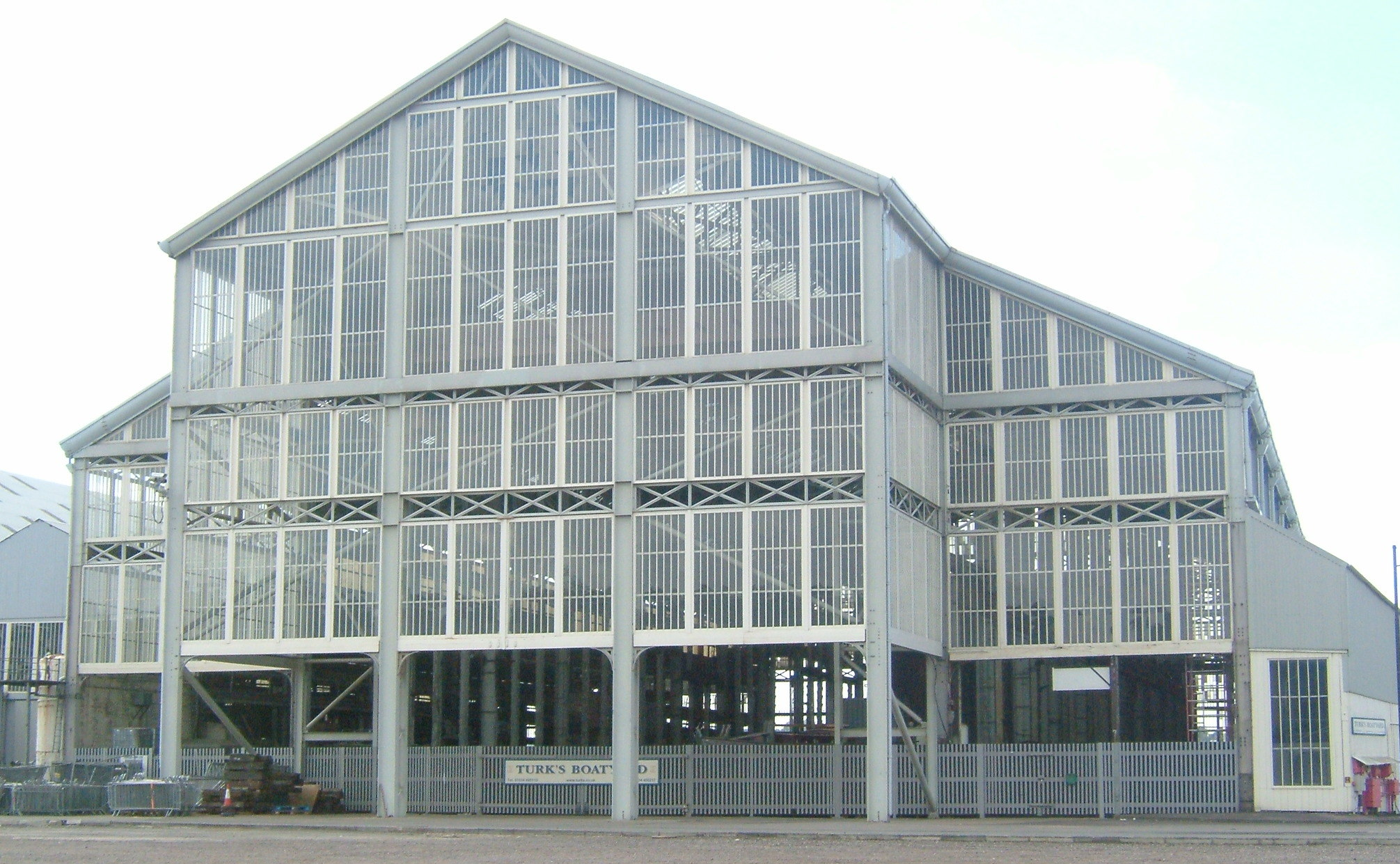
Slip 7 at Chatham Dockyard, 1852, also a Grade I listed building designed by Colonel Godfrey T. Green RE

It is an unusually large example of a boat store, built using an innovative structural system, with an all-metal frame incorporating metal portal bracing. After The Crystal Palace (constructed 1851; destroyed 1936) and the first South Kensington Museum (constructed 1857; removed and reused at Bethnal Green in 1874) the building is said to be the earliest surviving example of a multi-storey iron-frame building in the world.

The boat house is recognised as the world's first multi-storey building with a rigid metal frame, providing the pattern for many modern industrial and commercial buildings. A similar system used for the first skyscrapers in Chicago, and is now widely used for steel-framed building.

It became a listed building in 1962, and was promoted to Grade I in 1999. Its listing entry with Historic England states that it is "of international significance in the development of modern architecture". As of 2015, it was in very bad condition, and was listed as one of the Victorian Society's ten buildings most at risk in 2015. It remains unused, and has been on the Buildings at Risk Register for many years.

== Structure ==
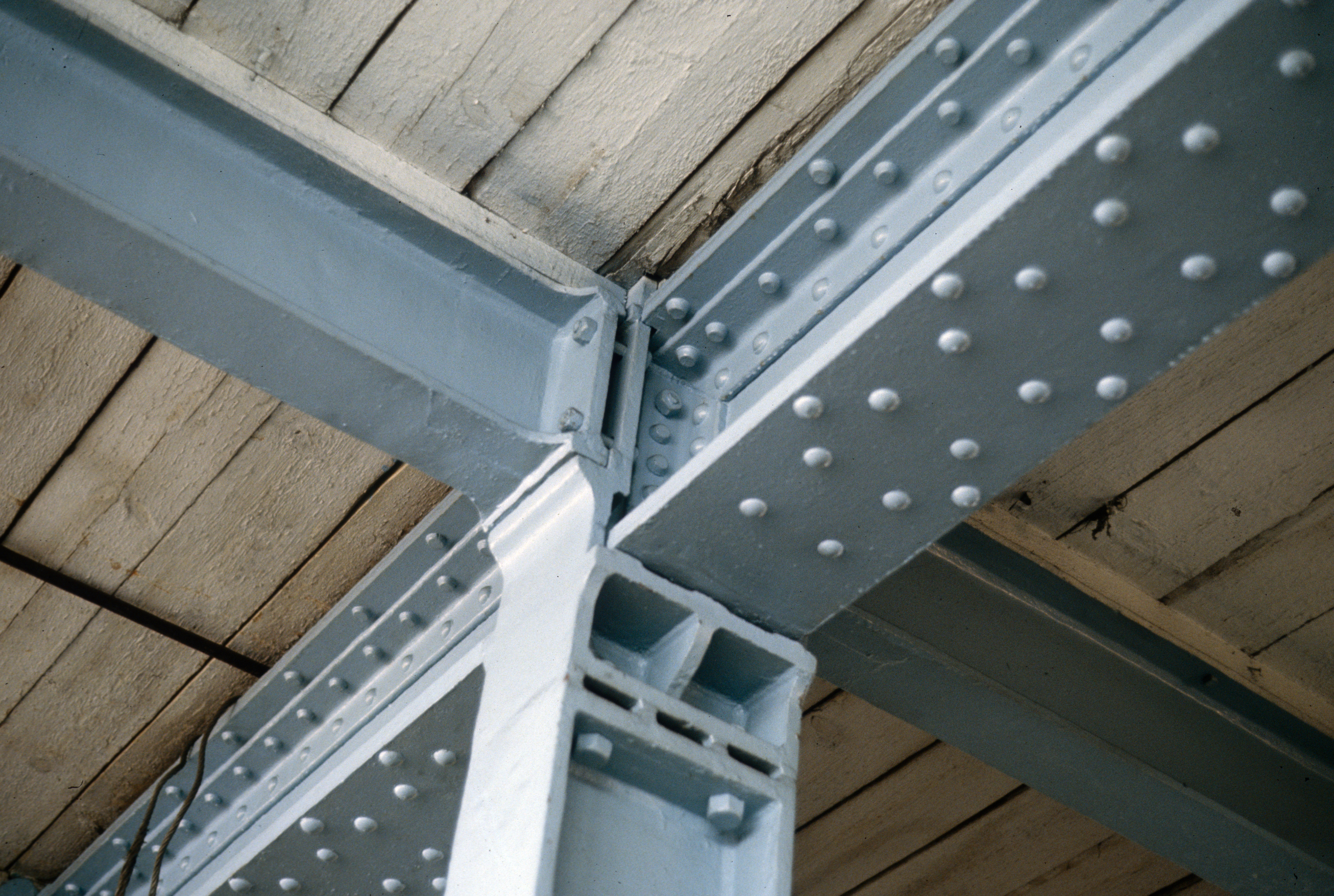
Detail of the connection between post and ceiling

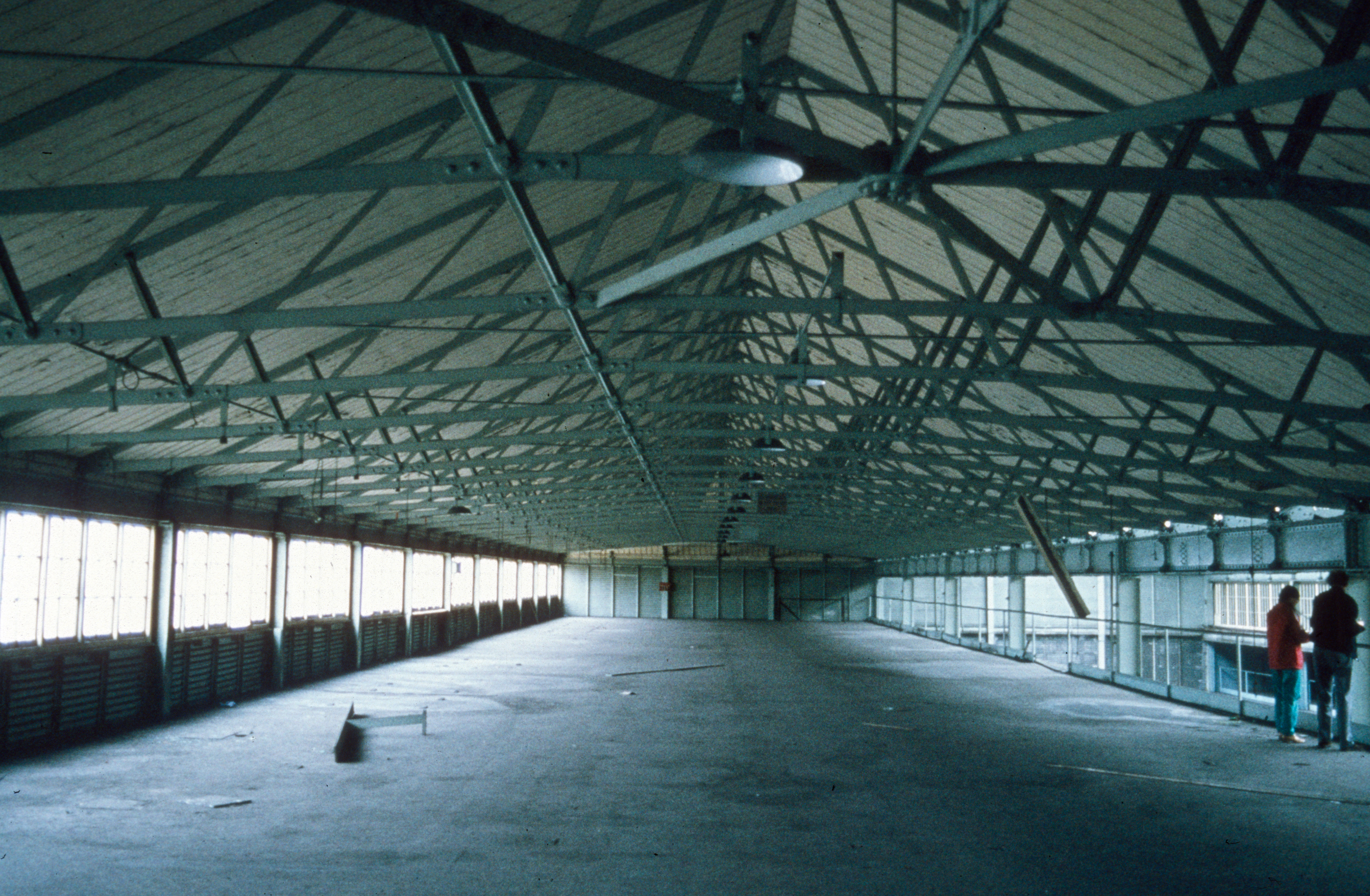
Roof structure

The building was constructed from wrought iron, with its walls and roof clad with corrugated iron. It has four storeys, with 14 bays on the main (north) frontage and 9 bays on the side return. The bays and floors are divided into regular units by 4 metres (13 ft) high cast iron columns which support 7 metres (23 ft) long cast iron beams with an I or H cross-section and supporting brackets, creating a rigid iron frame. Each unit on the north front has a full-width window with 5 casements (originally sashes), each with 3x2 panes, above a corrugated iron panel (replacing the original timber cladding, with brick infill added in 1946 on the ground floor). The west side has a gable end over the central 3 bays, above sliding doors on the ground, and hipped roofs on 3 three side bays. The south (rear) elevation is blind.

Internally, the building is divided into three sections which run on an east to west axis, each with 3 bays across their width: a wide full-height unobstructed central aisle, with storage bays on four floors in the sections to the north and south. A frame of cast-iron H-section columns and I-section joists divides the side aisles into 7 bays along their length.

An area on the third floor in the south east corner has an office area, divided by glazed panels. A timber winder stair leads up to an octagonal cupola above the roof.
