= Chartham =

Village and civil parish in Kent, England

Coordinates: 51.2645°N 1.0410°E

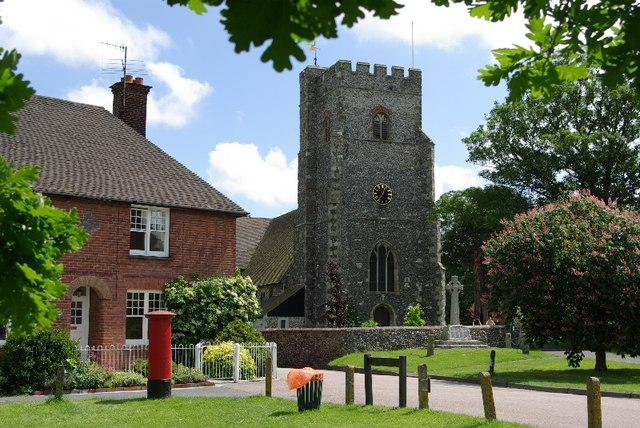
- St Mary's Church with part of the Green

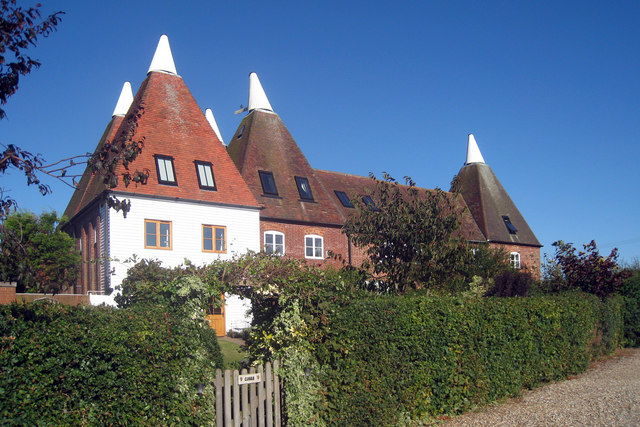
- Chartham Hatch

- Location within Kent
- Area: 20.84 km^{2} (8.05 sq mi)
- Population: 4,261 (Civil Parish 2011)
  - Density: 204/km^{2} (530/sq mi)
- OS grid reference: TR108549
- Civil parish: Chartham
- District: City of Canterbury
- Shire county: Kent
- Region: South East
- Country: England
- Sovereign state: United Kingdom
- Post town: Canterbury
- Postcode district: CT4
- Dialling code: 01227
- Police: Kent
- Fire: Kent
- Ambulance: South East Coast
- UK Parliament: Canterbury

Chartham is a village and civil parish in the Canterbury district of Kent, England. It is situated on the Ashford side of the city, and is in the North Downs area of Outstanding Natural Beauty, 2.3 mi (4 km) south west of Canterbury, England. The Great Stour Way path passes through the village. A paper mill in the village that had specialised in the production of tracing paper since 1938 has in 2022 closed down. There are numerous arable farms and orchards in the parish. The village has an unstaffed station, Chartham, and has recently upgraded its staffed level crossing to an automatic barrier. It has an outlying locality sharing in many of the community resources, Chartham Hatch.

Nearby communities are Harbledown and Rough Common, Blean, and to the north Thanington.

== History ==
=== Toponymy ===
The earliest recorded form of the name is Certham. The name Chartham literally means 'Village on rough ground', and the word "Chart" is also found in other villages in Kent with this meaning. The Stone Street part of the name comes from Stone Street, a road and small hamlet that runs parallel to the A28 on the other side of the villages.

=== 19th century ===
For Queen Victoria's Golden Jubilee, the village green was used for a fête with refreshments provided for paupers, seniors and children.

=== Modern day ===
The river provided power for the paper mills until some point before 1955. Paper making has been a major occupation for the last 625 years; the mill dates from the late eighteenth century.

The dovecote at Burnt House Farm is not only notable for its building's architectural merit but is also a Scheduled Ancient Monument for its importance in sending homing birds to and from important envoys such as the Archbishop of Canterbury.

== Geography and economy ==
Chartham is located on the Great Stour river scattered along the Ashford Road in Canterbury and on the vale of the Kent Downs Area of Outstanding Natural Beauty. Its paper mill specialises in the production of tracing paper. There are numerous arable farms and orchards in the parish.

The village is served by Chartham railway station which is one stop westbound from Canterbury West station on the high speed line to London, although high speed services do not stop here. Chartham is also on the western end of the 3-mile Great Stour Way cycle path to Canterbury City Centre.

Being in such close proximity to the city, the village's economy is closely tied to Canterbury. Aside from this, there are several village stores, two pubs, a small venue (Chartham Village Hall in Station Road) and a vineyard.

== Governance ==
At the national level Chartham is in the parliamentary constituency of Canterbury for which Rosie Duffield (Labour) has been MP since 2017. Prior to Brexit in 2020 for European elections Chartham was in the South East England constituency.

Chartham is also part of the electoral ward called Chartham and Stone Street. The population of this ward at the 2011 Census was 5,878.

== Demography ==
In the census of 1801 the number of people present in the parish of Chartham, enclosing an area of about 3 square miles (8 km^{2}) and including the settlement of Chartham Hatch, was given as 776, and this figure remained roughly stable until the late 19th century when a dramatic increase was recorded: in the census of 1881, the number was given as 2,473.

== Railway station ==
Chartham railway station lies one stop west of Canterbury West and has regular trains to London Charing Cross railway station. The HS1 trains to St Pancras also pass through the station but do not stop here.

== Landmarks ==
=== Church ===
The Church of St Mary is located next to the village green and contains six bells, five of which were made by Joseph Hatch in 1605, which makes the bells the oldest complete set by the same bellfounder in Kent. It was built in approximately 1294 and features a number of brasses, including that of Sir Robert de Setvans (d 1306). The stonework of its chancel windows exhibit a form of tracery, known as Kentish or split cusp tracery, which originates here. The tower is 14th century and the renovation was in 1875 by Oxford University architect George Edmund Street.

== Outlying areas ==
=== Shalmsford Street ===
The village is contiguous with the smaller Shalmsford Street to the west, and was until recently the location of St Augustine's Mental Hospital, formerly known as the East Kent Lunatic Asylum. The site on which St Augustine's stood has now become a housing estate.

The village's post office was at 105 Shalmsford Street, but is now located at 14B Godfrey Gardens in the Chartham Downs housing area. In Shalmsford Street is also Chartham Primary School, in which Chartham Parish meetings are held.

=== Chartham Hatch ===
Chartham Hatch is the northern upper part of the village, also known as a hamlet, of approximately 200 houses. It is surrounded by small woods and its orchards of apples and pears. Village Hall, formerly the school, is in the centre. The famous North Downs Way passes through the village.

=== Horton ===
Horton or Horton Manor is a tiny hamlet northeast by the Great Stour Way with its weir, Grade II listed manor house, and scheduled ancient monument manor chapel remains, later which became an oast house and agricultural storage area. In 844 King Æthelwulf of Wessex granted land at Horton to Ealdorman Eadred. A translation of the text of Charter S 319 reads: "Bounds of Horton. On the east: the wood which is called down-grove. On the west: the [arch]bishop and Lulla jointly. On the southern side: the land of Lulla at Chartham. On the north: the land of Beornwulf, which he possesses in eternity."

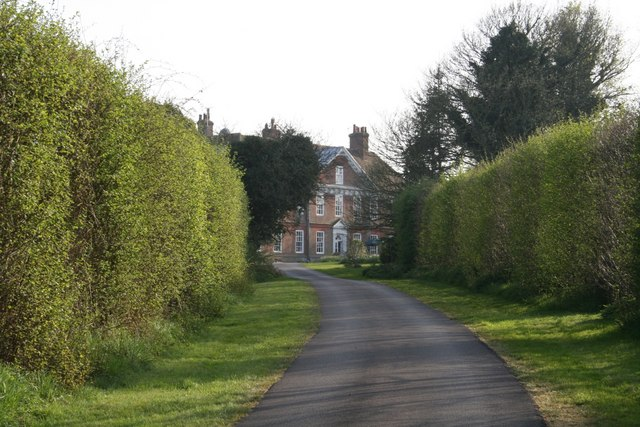
Mystole House

=== Mystole and Thruxted ===
These hamlets are south west along the Great Stour and to the south east. Mystole is rich in heritage due to its focal point, Mystole House, a 16th-century historic building, with architectural Grade II* status and former appurtenances/outbuildings: Grade II* listed Mystole Coach House; its Park; listed orangery; tennis court; Archway Lodge; The Tetherings and Stable House. Thruxted itself has a large working farmhouse.

=== Chartham Downs ===
Built on the ground of the former mental asylum hospital, and sharing the name of the hospital, Chartham Downs is a large housing area to the south-east of the village. It encompasses a local shop (incorporating the village post office), football/cricket grounds and three children's play parks. It lies on the North Downs Way, and is closer to Street End, Nackington and Thanington than to the opposite end of Chartham. This fact means that the estate whilst being part of Chartham in a political aspect, is in many ways cut off from the village. In 1997 development of the site for housing was begun. A few of the hospital buildings, including the administration block, the water tower, and the chapel, were retained but the rest were demolished. Although Canterbury City Council suggested that "a change of name would help in creating a new sense of identity", the site is known as St Augustine's Estate, however signs refer to the area as 'Chartham Downs'.
