= Blackfriars, Canterbury =

Former Dominican priory in Kent, England

Coordinates: 51°16′53″N 1°4′46″E

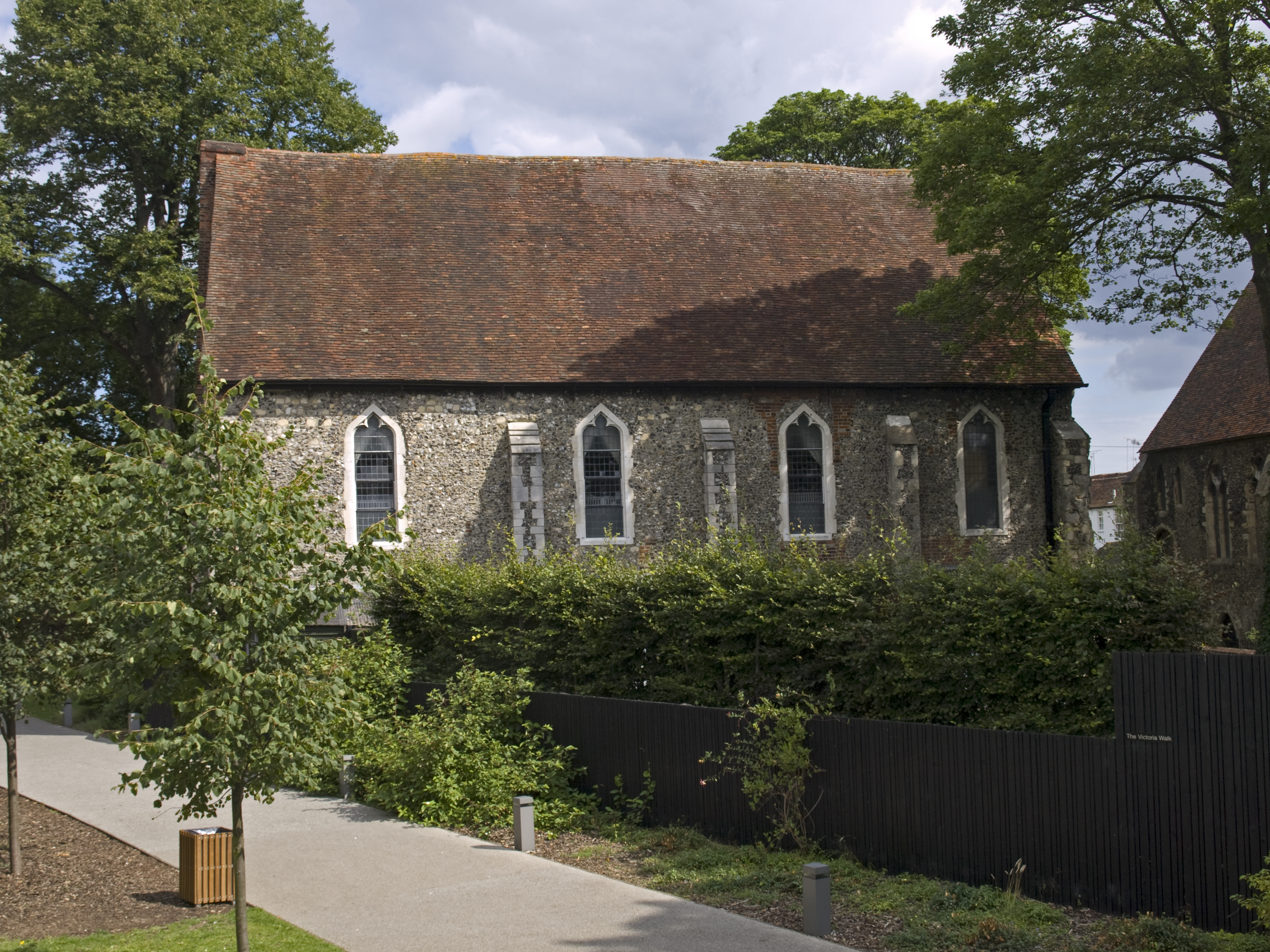
The former guesthouse building

Blackfriars, Canterbury was a priory of the Dominican Order in Kent, England. Founded in 1237 it lay either side of the River Stour in the west of the city, adjacent to where the Marlowe Theatre now stands. Some buildings still remain and are used for community purposes.

== History ==
In 1237 Henry III granted the Dominicans land within the city walls, £500 and timber for the roofs to build a church and priory. The site was centred on the modern Blackfriars Street. The priory was suppressed in 1538 and became a weaving factory, but over the following century buildings were gradually demolished.

The refectory on the east bank survives to this day – it was used as an Anabaptist (later Unitarian) meeting house from 1640 until 1912. In the 1920s it was restored and used as a store before the Cleary Foundation bought it in 1982 to give to The King's School as an art gallery. The location of the gatehouse is marked by a plaque and paving at the entrance to The Friars.

The guest house on the west bank became a private residence in the 1780s and a furniture store from 1905. In 1979 it was bought and restored by local residents Mr and Mrs Beerling for use as a scout and community hall.
