= St Mildred's Church, Canterbury =

Church of Saint Mildred
- Church of St. Mildred with St. Mary de Castro
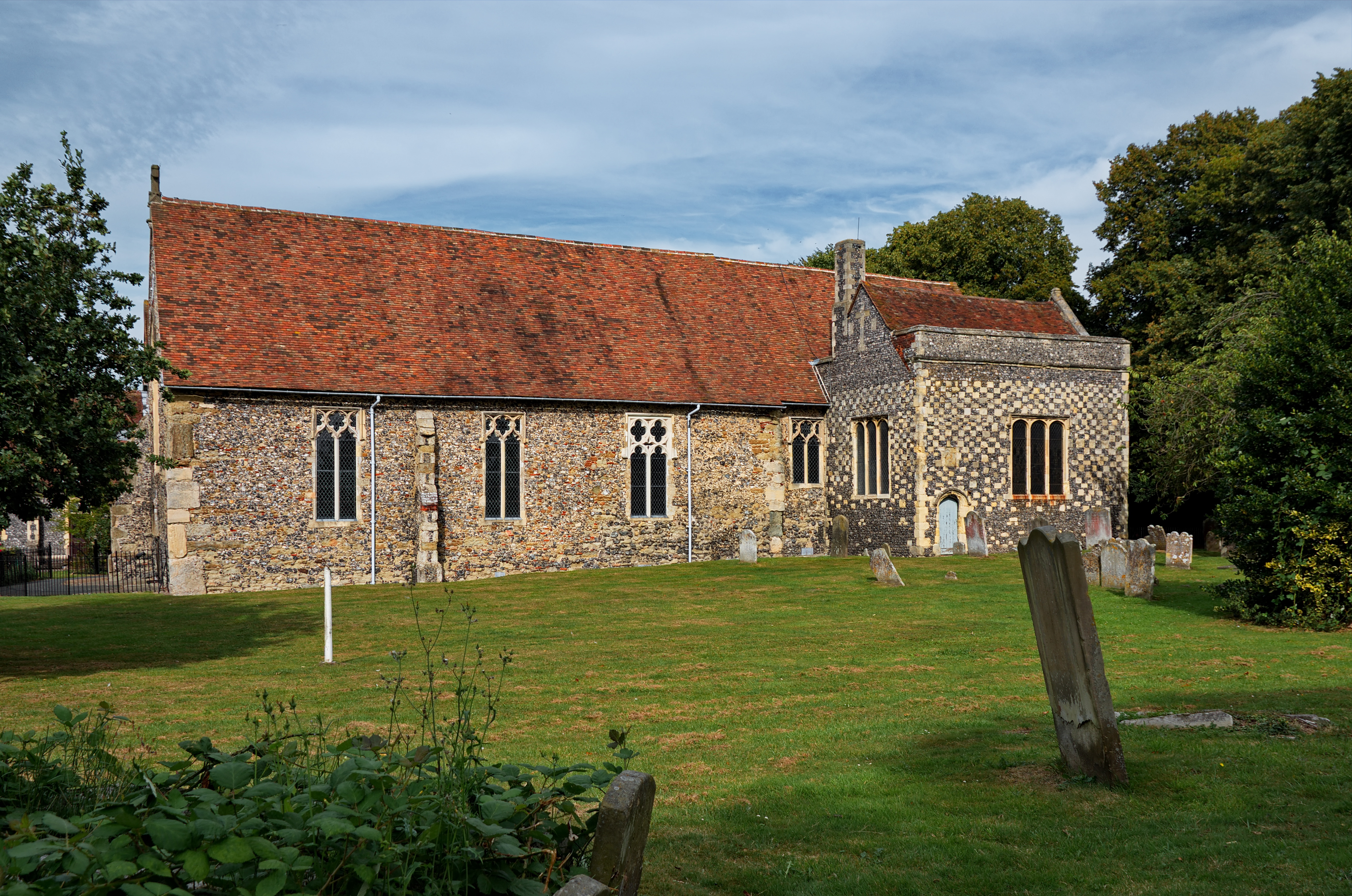
- St. Mildred's Church seen from the south
- Church of Saint Mildred
- 51°16′36″N 1°4′27″E
- OS grid reference: TR 14500 57514
- Location: Canterbury, Kent
- Country: England
- Denomination: Church of England
- Previous denomination: Catholic
- Tradition: Anglo-Catholic

History
- Consecrated: Before 1066

Administration
- Province: Canterbury
- Diocese: Canterbury

The Church of Saint Mildred is a partly Anglo-Saxon stone church in Canterbury probably dating from the 11th century. It has been a Grade I listed building since 1949. It is located in the St. Mildred's quarter of the historic city centre. This is the only surviving pre-Norman church within the former city walls.

== History ==
It is unknown when the church was originally built, but two of the walls of the nave are Anglo-Saxon, i.e. are preserved from before 1066. It is believed that the chancel is Anglo-Saxon as well. The relics of Saint Mildred, who died in 768, were transferred from Canterbury Cathedral to St Augustine's Abbey in the middle of the 11th century, and it is likely that the church was built at that time.

St Mildred's Church has a five-bay nave and a two-bay chancel. Most of the nave and the chapels date from between the 13th century and 1512. It was extensively restored in 1861.

The church belonged to St Augustine's Abbey until the abbey was abolished during the dissolution of the monasteries in 1538, and since then it has belonged to the Crown.

=== Present Day ===
The Church of Saint Mildred is now part of the Benefice of St Dunstan, St Mildred and St Peter, Canterbury in the Archdeaconry of Canterbury of the Diocese of Canterbury. The church stands in the Anglo-Catholic tradition of the Church of England.
