= Grade I listed buildings in Swale =

There are over 9,000 Grade I listed buildings in England. This page is a list of these buildings in the district of Swale in Kent.

== Swale ==
Name	Location	Type	Completed (Note: The date given is the date used by Historic England as significant for the initial building or that of an important part in the structure's description.)	Date designated	Grid ref. (Note: The grid reference is based on the British national grid reference system, sometimes known as OSGB36, used by the Ordnance Survey.) Geo-coordinates	Entry number (Note: The "List Entry Number" is a unique number assigned to each listed building and scheduled monument by Historic England.)	Image
Church of St Lawrence	Bapchild, Swale	Parish Church	12th century	24 January 1967	TQ9272962968; 51°19′59″N 0°45′55″E	1115459	Church of St Lawrence More images
Church of St Bartholomew	Bobbing, Swale	Parish Church	Earlier	24 January 1967	TQ8881465119; 51°21′14″N 0°42′37″E	1299598	Church of St Bartholomew More images
Church of St Peter and St Paul	Borden, Swale	Parish Church	12th century	24 January 1967	TQ8823862981; 51°20′05″N 0°42′03″E	1185731	Church of St Peter and St Paul More images
Church of St Peter and St Paul	South Street, Boughton under Blean, Swale	Parish Church	13th century	24 January 1967	TR0478458554; 51°17′21″N 0°56′08″E	1325956	Church of St Peter and St Paul More images
Church of St John the Baptist	Bredgar, Swale	Parish Church	12th century	24 January 1967	TQ8800760322; 51°18′39″N 0°41′46″E	1343876	Church of St John the Baptist More images
Church of the Beheading of St John the Baptist	Doddington, Swale	Parish Church	12th century	24 January 1967	TQ9400257582; 51°17′04″N 0°46′50″E	1087004	Church of the Beheading of St John the Baptist More images
Sharsted Court	Sharsted Court, Doddington, Swale	Manor House	14th century to 17th century	24 January 1967	TQ9511958174; 51°17′21″N 0°47′49″E	1335856	Sharsted Court More images
Church of All Saints	Eastchurch, Swale	Church	1431 to 1432	27 June 1963	TQ9883571422; 51°24′25″N 0°51′27″E	1273520	Church of All Saints More images
Church of St Mary Magdalene	Davington, Faversham, Swale	Manor House	Acquired by Church of England	29 July 1950	TR0109861753; 51°19′10″N 0°53′04″E	1069406	Church of St Mary Magdalene More images
Faversham Abbey Minor Barn	Faversham, Faversham, Swale	Abbey	c. 1350	3 August 1972	TR0212761732; 51°19′08″N 0°53′57″E	1060996	Faversham Abbey Minor Barn More images
The Parish Church of St Mary of Charity	Faversham, Faversham, Swale	Parish Church	Medieval	29 July 1950	TR0182261535; 51°19′02″N 0°53′41″E	1319973	The Parish Church of St Mary of Charity More images
Church of All Saints	Graveney with Goodnestone, Swale	Parish Church	12th century	24 January 1967	TR0526962682; 51°19′34″N 0°56′41″E	1069110	Church of All Saints More images
Church of St Bartholomew, Goodnestone	Graveney with Goodnestone, Swale	Manor House	12th century	24 January 1967	TR0443661580; 51°19′00″N 0°55′56″E	1069144	Church of St Bartholomew, Goodnestone More images
Church of St Michael	Hartlip, Swale	Parish Church	13th century to 15th century	24 January 1967	TQ8392364283; 51°20′52″N 0°38′23″E	1320011	Church of St Michael More images
Church of St Michael	Hernhill Green, Hernhill, Swale	Manor House	15th century	24 January 1967	TR0649160680; 51°18′28″N 0°57′40″E	1069116	Church of St Michael More images
Church of All Saints	Iwade, Swale	Manor House	13th century	24 January 1967	TQ9013267949; 51°22′43″N 0°43′50″E	1069380	Church of All Saints More images
Church of St Mary	Luddenham, Luddenham, Swale	Parish Church	12th century	24 January 1967	TQ9923663137; 51°19′57″N 0°51′31″E	1069094	Church of St Mary More images
Church of St Peter and St Paul	Lynsted with Kingsdown, Swale	Manor House	14th century	24 January 1967	TQ9426460878; 51°18′50″N 0°47′10″E	1069313	Church of St Peter and St Paul More images
Lynsted Court	Lynsted with Kingsdown, Swale	Manor House	1952	27 August 1952	TQ9417460619; 51°18′42″N 0°47′05″E	1069274	Lynsted Court More images
The Abbey Church of St Mary and St Sexburga	Minster on Sea, Minster-on-Sea, Swale	Abbey	Rebuilt between 1123 and 1136	27 June 1963	TQ9560772985; 51°25′20″N 0°48′43″E	1273489	The Abbey Church of St Mary and St Sexburga More images
The Abbey Gatehouse	Minster on Sea, Minster-on-Sea, Swale	Abbey	13th century	14 May 1952	TQ9556572998; 51°25′20″N 0°48′41″E	1258332	The Abbey Gatehouse More images
Church of St Mary	Newington, Swale	Parish Church	13th century	24 January 1967	TQ8622965341; 51°21′24″N 0°40′24″E	1069347	Church of St Mary More images
Church of St Mary	Norton, Buckland and Stone, Swale	Manor House	12th century to 14th century	24 January 1967	TQ9677661100; 51°18′54″N 0°49′20″E	1069252	Church of St Mary More images
Church of St Peter	Oare, Oare, Swale	Manor House	13th century	24 January 1967	TR0078863323; 51°20′01″N 0°52′52″E	1069126	Church of St Peter More images
Church of St Nicholas	Rodmersham, Swale	Parish Church	13th century	24 January 1967	TQ9259761809; 51°19′22″N 0°45′46″E	1120902	Church of St Nicholas More images
Church of St Mary	St Mary's Church, Selling, Swale	Parish Church	c. 1190	24 January 1967	TR0378856834; 51°16′27″N 0°55′13″E	1343628	Church of St Mary More images
Copton Manor	North Street, Sheldwich, Swale	House	18th century	24 January 1967	TR0170659022; 51°17′41″N 0°53′30″E	1372896	Upload Photo
Lees Court	Lees Court, Sheldwich, Swale	Flats	1952	27 August 1952	TR0203656066; 51°16′05″N 0°53′41″E	1363416	Lees Court More images
Church of St Mary	Teynham, Swale	Parish Church	13th century	24 January 1967	TQ9661463631; 51°20′16″N 0°49′17″E	1069254	Church of St Mary More images
Belmont, with Stable Courtyard and Pump	Belmont, Throwley, Swale	House	1769	24 January 1967	TQ9858656362; 51°16′18″N 0°50′44″E	1343978	Belmont, with Stable Courtyard and Pump More images
Church of St Michael and All Angels	Throwley Forstal, Throwley, Swale	Statue	1835	28 August 1986	TQ9914455651; 51°15′55″N 0°51′11″E	1343984	Church of St Michael and All Angels More images
Church of St Giles	Tonge, Swale	Parish Church	12th century	24 January 1967	TQ9342464035; 51°20′33″N 0°46′33″E	1322821	Church of St Giles More images
Church of St John the Baptist	Tunstall, Swale	Manor House	13th century	24 January 1967	TQ8959061899; 51°19′29″N 0°43′11″E	1069356	Church of St John the Baptist More images
Tunstall House	Tunstall, Swale	House	Pre 1678	27 August 1952	TQ8946161825; 51°19′26″N 0°43′04″E	1069357	Tunstall House More images
Church of St Mary the Virgin	Upchurch, Swale	Parish Church	c. 1300	24 January 1967	TQ8436867499; 51°22′36″N 0°38′52″E	1343934	Church of St Mary the Virgin More images
Parish Church of the Holy Trinity	Milton Regis, Swale	Parish Church	14th century	10 September 1951	TQ9088865394; 51°21′20″N 0°44′25″E	1061036	Parish Church of the Holy Trinity More images
Shed Number 78, the Boat Store Building Number 78	Sheerness Dockyard, Swale	Boat Store	1856-1860	21 June 1962	TQ9088875297; 51°26′40″N 0°44′44″E	1273160	Shed Number 78, the Boat Store Building Number 78 More images
