= Grade I listed buildings in Gravesham =

There are over 9,000 Grade I listed buildings in England. This page is a list of these buildings in the district of Gravesham in Kent.

== Gravesham ==
Name	Location	Type	Completed (Note: The date given is the date used by Historic England as significant for the initial building or that of an important part in the structure's description.)	Date designated	Grid ref. (Note: Sometimes known as OSGB36, the grid reference is based on the British national grid reference system used by the Ordnance Survey.) Geo-coordinates	Entry number (Note: The "List Entry Number" is a unique number assigned to each listed building and scheduled monument by Historic England.)	Image
Cobham College	Cobham, Gravesham	Kitchen	Late 16th century	28 August 2000	TQ6696868343; 51°23′22″N 0°23′54″E	1096317	Cobham College More images
Cobham Hall (including Kitchen and Stable Court)	Cobham	House	Until 1662	27 August 1952	TQ6836668914; 51°23′39″N 0°25′07″E	1095053	Cobham Hall (including Kitchen and Stable Court) More images
Parish Church of St Mary Magdalene	Cobham	Church	About 1200	21 November 1966	TQ6696968383; 51°23′24″N 0°23′54″E	1350259	Parish Church of St Mary Magdalene More images
The Mausoleum, Cobham Hall	Cobham	Steps	1783	27 August 1952	TQ6943768379; 51°23′21″N 0°26′02″E	1095055	The Mausoleum, Cobham Hall More images
Church of St Mary	Higham	Church	Saxon	21 November 1966	TQ7164074207; 51°26′27″N 0°28′06″E	1350225	Church of St Mary More images
Gadshill Place	Higham	House	1779	27 August 1952	TQ7102070872; 51°24′40″N 0°27′28″E	1049037	Gadshill Place More images
Luddesdown Court	Luddesdown	House	17th century	27 August 1952	TQ6691366164; 51°22′12″N 0°23′47″E	1096343	Luddesdown Court More images
Nurstead Court	Meopham	Aisled House	c. 1320	21 November 1966	TQ6405668568; 51°23′33″N 0°21′24″E	1350239	Upload Photo
Parish Church of St John the Baptist	Meopham	Parish Church	1320-25	21 November 1966	TQ6447166240; 51°22′17″N 0°21′41″E	1039866	Parish Church of St John the Baptist More images
Parish Church of St Botolph	The Hill	Parish Church	Earlier	4 July 1952	TQ6234974141; 51°26′35″N 0°20′05″E	1054093	Parish Church of St Botolph More images
