= Grade I listed buildings in Thanet =

There are over 9,000 Grade I listed buildings in England. This page is a list of these buildings in the district of Thanet in Kent.

== Thanet ==
Name	Location	Type	Completed (Note: The date given is the date used by Historic England as significant for the initial building or that of an important part in the structure's description.)	Date designated	Grid ref. (Note: The grid reference is based on the British national grid reference system, sometimes known as OSGB36, used by the Ordnance Survey.) Geo-coordinates	Entry number (Note: The "List Entry Number" is a unique number assigned to each listed building and scheduled monument by Historic England.)	Image
Church of Saint Mary	Minster, Thanet	Minster	11th century	11 October 1963	TR3108964254; 51°19′49″N 1°18′57″E	1224116	Church of Saint Mary More images
Minster Abbey	Minster, Thanet	Abbey	1937	6 February 1958	TR3119964363; 51°19′53″N 1°19′03″E	1223807	Minster Abbey More images
Church of Saint Mary Magdalene	Monkton, Thanet	Parish Church	Late 12th century	11 October 1963	TR2790465254; 51°20′26″N 1°16′15″E	1224791	Church of Saint Mary Magdalene More images
Church of St Augustine of England (Roman Catholic) with Cloisters Attached	Ramsgate, Thanet	Abbey	1856	4 February 1988	TR3766864329; 51°19′42″N 1°24′37″E	1281779	Church of St Augustine of England (Roman Catholic) with Cloisters Attached More images
Church of St George	Ramsgate, Thanet	Church	1824-27	4 February 1988	TR3816665212; 51°20′10″N 1°25′04″E	1085430	Church of St George More images
Church of St Laurence	St Lawrence, Ramsgate, Thanet	Church	foundations 1062	4 February 1988	TR3703165321; 51°20′15″N 1°24′06″E	1336662	Church of St Laurence More images
St Edwards	Ramsgate, Thanet	Priests House	dated 1849	23 June 1986	TR3764364332; 51°19′42″N 1°24′35″E	1086095	St Edwards More images
The Grange	Ramsgate, Thanet	House	1843-4	13 August 1968	TR3764464311; 51°19′42″N 1°24′35″E	1203285	The Grange More images
Church of Saint Nicholas	St. Nicholas At Wade, Thanet	Parish Church	12th century	11 October 1963	TR2651466699; 51°21′15″N 1°15′07″E	1225043	Church of Saint Nicholas More images
Parish Church of St John the Baptist	Margate, Thanet	Parish Church	1124	10 April 1951	TR3554370400; 51°23′01″N 1°23′01″E	1351103	Parish Church of St John the Baptist More images
The Grotto	Margate, Thanet	Shell Grotto	Early 19th century	22 February 1973	TR3593270870; 51°23′16″N 1°23′23″E	1341537	The Grotto More images
