= Patrick Mayhew =

British politician (1929–2016)

The Right Honourable The Lord Mayhew of Twysden PC QC DL
- Official portrait, 1995

Secretary of State for Northern Ireland
- In office 10 April 1992 – 2 May 1997
- Prime Minister: John Major
- Preceded by: Peter Brooke
- Succeeded by: Mo Mowlam

Attorney General for England and Wales Attorney General for Northern Ireland
- In office 13 June 1987 – 10 April 1992
- Prime Minister: Margaret Thatcher; John Major
- Preceded by: Michael Havers
- Succeeded by: Sir Nicholas Lyell

Solicitor General for England and Wales
- In office 13 June 1983 – 13 June 1987
- Prime Minister: Margaret Thatcher
- Preceded by: Ian Percival
- Succeeded by: Sir Nicholas Lyell

Minister of State for the Home Office
- In office 5 January 1981 – 13 June 1983
- Prime Minister: Margaret Thatcher
- Preceded by: Leon Brittan
- Succeeded by: Douglas Hurd

Parliamentary Under-Secretary of State for Employment
- In office 4 May 1979 – 5 January 1981
- Prime Minister: Margaret Thatcher
- Preceded by: John Grant
- Succeeded by: David Waddington

Member of Parliament for Tunbridge Wells
- In office 28 February 1974 – 8 April 1997
- Preceded by: Constituency established
- Succeeded by: Archie Norman

Member of the House of Lords
- Lord Temporal
- Life peerage 12 June 1997 – 1 June 2015

Personal details
- Born: Patrick Barnabas Burke Mayhew; 11 September 1929 Cookham, Berkshire, England
- Died: 25 June 2016 (aged 86) Kilndown, Kent, England
- Party: Conservative
- Spouse: Jean Gurney (m. 1963)
- Children: 4
- Education: Balliol College, Oxford; Middle Temple

Patrick Barnabas Burke Mayhew, Baron Mayhew of Twysden (11 September 1929 – 25 June 2016), was a British politician and barrister.

== Early life ==
Mayhew was born in Cookham, Berkshire, on 11 September 1929. His father, Geoffrey Mayhew (full name Alfred Geoffrey Horace Mayhew), was a decorated army officer turned oil executive; his mother, Sheila Roche (full name Sheila Margaret Burke Roche), descended from members of the Anglo-Irish Protestant ascendancy, was a relative of James Roche, 3rd Baron Fermoy, an Irish National Federation MP for Kerry East. Through his father, Mayhew was related to the Victorian social commentator Henry Mayhew. He was educated at Tonbridge School, an all-boys public school in Tonbridge, Kent.

He then served as an officer in the 4th/7th Royal Dragoon Guards, studied law at Balliol College, Oxford, and was president of the Oxford University Conservative Association and of the Oxford Union. He was called to the Bar by the Middle Temple in 1955.

== Political career ==
Mayhew contested Dulwich in 1970, but the incumbent Labour member, Sam Silkin, beat him by 895 votes. He was Member of Parliament (MP) for the Tunbridge Wells constituency from its creation at the February 1974 general election, standing down at the 1997 election.

He was Parliamentary Under-Secretary of State for Employment from 1979 to 1981, then Minister of State at the Home Office from 1981 to 1983. After this, he served as Solicitor General for England and Wales from 1983 to 1987, and then Attorney General for England and Wales and simultaneously Attorney General for Northern Ireland from 1987 to 1992.

He was Secretary of State for Northern Ireland from 1992 to 1997.

He was one of only five Ministers (Tony Newton, Kenneth Clarke, Malcolm Rifkind and Lynda Chalker are the others) to serve throughout the whole 18 years of the Governments of Margaret Thatcher and John Major. This represents the longest uninterrupted Ministerial service in Britain since Lord Palmerston in the early 19th century.

== Honours and awards ==
Mayhew was knighted in 1983. On 12 June 1997, he was given a life peerage as Baron Mayhew of Twysden, of Kilndown in the County of Kent. He retired from the House of Lords on 1 June 2015.

== Personal life ==
In 1963, Mayhew married Jean Gurney, and they had four sons. His son Jerome Mayhew is the Conservative MP for the constituency of Broadland and Fakenham (previously Broadland) in Norfolk since the 2019 general election.

Mayhew, a devout Anglican, was a churchwarden at Christ Church, Kilndown.

Mayhew suffered from cancer and Parkinson's disease in his later years. He died from cancer at his home on 25 June 2016, aged 86.

== Arms ==
Coat of arms of Patrick Mayhew

Crest
An eagle winds elevated and addorsed Argent beaked and legged Or the dexter foot plucking a harp also Or.
Escutcheon
Or an orle fracted and there conjoined to two chevronels couped Azure between three trefoils slipped Vert each enfiling a coronet Azure.
Supporters
Dexter a roach urinant argent finned Or sinister a gurnard urinant Argent finned Or.
Motto
Mon Dieu Est Ma Roche

Parliament of the United Kingdom
New constituency	Member of Parliament for Tunbridge Wells; 1974–1997	Succeeded by Archie Norman
Political offices
Preceded by Ian Percival	Solicitor General for England and Wales; 1983–1987	Succeeded by Nicholas Lyell
Preceded by Michael Havers	Attorney General for England and Wales; 1987–1992	Succeeded by Nicholas Lyell
Preceded by Michael Havers	Attorney General for Northern Ireland; 1987–1992	Succeeded by Nicholas Lyell
Preceded by Peter Brooke	Secretary of State for Northern Ireland; 1992–1997	Succeeded by Mo Mowlam
