= Grade I listed buildings in Tunbridge Wells (borough) =

There are over 9,000 Grade I listed buildings in England. This page is a list of these buildings in the district of Tunbridge Wells in Kent.

== Tunbridge Wells ==
Name	Location	Type	Completed (Note: The date given is the date used by Historic England as significant for the initial building or that of an important part in the structure's description.)	Date designated	Grid ref. (Note: Sometimes known as OSGB36, the grid reference is based on the British national grid reference system used by the Ordnance Survey.) Geo-coordinates	Entry number (Note: The "List Entry Number" is a unique number assigned to each listed building and scheduled monument by Historic England.)	Image
Matfield House	Matfield, Brenchley, Tunbridge Wells	House	Dated 1738	20 October 1954	TQ6581541928; 51°09′09″N 0°22′10″E	1250644	Matfield House More images
Stable Block immediately North East of Matfield House	Matfield, Brenchley	Stable	1736 on clock	20 October 1954	TQ6583541943; 51°09′10″N 0°22′11″E	1250646	Stable Block immediately North East of Matfield House More images
Parish Church of All Saints	Brenchley	Parish Church	Evidence of pre 13th century masonry	20 October 1954	TQ6796941708; 51°09′00″N 0°24′01″E	1249609	Parish Church of All Saints More images
Church of All Saints	Capel	Church	'Lately rebuilt' in 1798	20 October 1954	TQ6215645407; 51°11′06″N 0°19′08″E	1261437	Church of All Saints More images
Church of St Thomas à Becket	Capel	Parish Church	Norman origins	20 October 1954	TQ6373444513; 51°10′35″N 0°20′28″E	1262867	Church of St Thomas à Becket More images
Somerhill	Somerhill Park, Capel	School	1954	20 October 1954	TQ6086745121; 51°10′58″N 0°18′01″E	1253489	Somerhill More images
Barn 60 Yards North of the West Range of Sissinghurst Castle	Sissinghurst, Cranbrook	Barn	Early 16th century	20 June 1967	TQ8078138392; 51°06′59″N 0°34′54″E	1099119	Barn 60 Yards North of the West Range of Sissinghurst Castle More images
Church of St Dunstan	Cranbrook	Obelisk	1736	20 June 1967	TQ7768936169; 51°05′50″N 0°32′11″E	1099931	Church of St Dunstan More images
Cranbrook or Union Windmill	Cranbrook	Smock Mill	1814	9 June 1952	TQ7790635948; 51°05′43″N 0°32′21″E	1356175	Cranbrook or Union Windmill More images
Old Wilsley	Wilsley Green, Cranbrook	Kitchen	Former	9 June 1952	TQ7796336997; 51°06′17″N 0°32′26″E	1338663	Upload Photo
Tower and Walls 30 Yards East of the West Range at Sissinghurst Castle	Sissinghurst, Cranbrook	Tower	c. 1570	9 June 1952	TQ8080538315; 51°06′56″N 0°34′55″E	1084163	Tower and Walls 30 Yards East of the West Range at Sissinghurst Castle More images
West Range at Sissinghurst Castle	Sissinghurst, Cranbrook	Apartment	1986	9 June 1952	TQ8077638324; 51°06′56″N 0°34′53″E	1346285	West Range at Sissinghurst Castle More images
Christ Church	Kilndown, Goudhurst	Parish Church	1839-41	26 September 1980	TQ7006035187; 51°05′27″N 0°25′37″E	1338690	Christ Church More images
Church of St Mary	Goudhurst	Parish Church	13th century to 15th century	20 June 1967	TQ7239437810; 51°06′49″N 0°27′42″E	1338671	Church of St Mary More images
Finchcocks	Finchcocks, Goudhurst	House	dated 1725	9 June 1952	TQ7003836460; 51°06′08″N 0°25′38″E	1318935	Finchcocks More images
Church of St Laurence	Hawkhurst	Cross	1917	20 June 1967	TQ7559629449; 51°02′15″N 0°30′11″E	1120819	Church of St Laurence More images
Church of St Margaret	Horsmonden	Parish Church	14th century	20 October 1954	TQ7038338112; 51°07′01″N 0°25′59″E	1087022	Church of St Margaret More images
Church of St Mary	Lamberhurst	Parish Church	12th century	20 October 1954	TQ6820736580; 51°06′14″N 0°24′04″E	1084519	Church of St Mary More images
Scotney Castle with Courtyards and Garden Terrace	Lamberhurst	House	1837-44	20 October 1954	TQ6873435373; 51°05′34″N 0°24′29″E	1336699	Scotney Castle with Courtyards and Garden Terrace More images
The Ruins of Old Scotney Castle	Scotney, Lamberhurst	Castle	1378	20 October 1954	TQ6896835229; 51°05′29″N 0°24′41″E	1085287	The Ruins of Old Scotney Castle More images
Old Church of St Peter	Pembury	Parish Church	Norman	20 October 1954	TQ6260442979; 51°09′47″N 0°19′27″E	1254444	Old Church of St Peter More images
Buildings of the Service Courtyard Adjoining South of Groombridge Place Including the Walls of the Herb Garden	Old Groombridge, Speldhurst	House	c. 1660	20 October 1954	TQ5335637592; 51°07′02″N 0°11′23″E	1260883	Buildings of the Service Courtyard Adjoining South of Groombridge Place Including the Walls of the Herb Garden More images
Chapel of St John the Evangelist	Old Groombridge, Speldhurst	Chapel of Ease	1625	20 October 1954	TQ5306537682; 51°07′05″N 0°11′08″E	1240708	Chapel of St John the Evangelist More images
Church of St Martin of Tours	Ashurst, Speldhurst	Church	14th century	20 October 1954	TQ5117339037; 51°07′50″N 0°09′33″E	1074896	Church of St Martin of Tours More images
Garden Walls and Features of the Terraced Garden (including Ivy Cottage) approx. 30 Metres North of Groombridge Place	Old Groombridge, Speldhurst	House	c. 1980	20 October 1954	TQ5328437681; 51°07′05″N 0°11′19″E	1240706	Garden Walls and Features of the Terraced Garden (including Ivy Cottage) approx. 30 Metres North of Groombridge Place More images
Groombridge Place	Old Groombridge, Speldhurst	Country House	Between 1652 and 1674	20 October 1954	TQ5334137619; 51°07′02″N 0°11′22″E	1260959	Groombridge Place More images
Groombridge Place Moat, Walls and Bridge including the West Gateway and Cottage on the North Bridge	Old Groombridge, Speldhurst	House	Second half of 17th century	20 October 1954	TQ5322937625; 51°07′03″N 0°11′16″E	1260960	Groombridge Place Moat, Walls and Bridge including the West Gateway and Cottage on the North Bridge More images
The Church of King Charles the Martyr	Tunbridge Wells	Church	1676-1684	20 May 1952	TQ5819738810; 51°07′36″N 0°15′34″E	1084478	The Church of King Charles the Martyr More images
