= The Battle of Albuera =

Painting by William Barnes Wollen

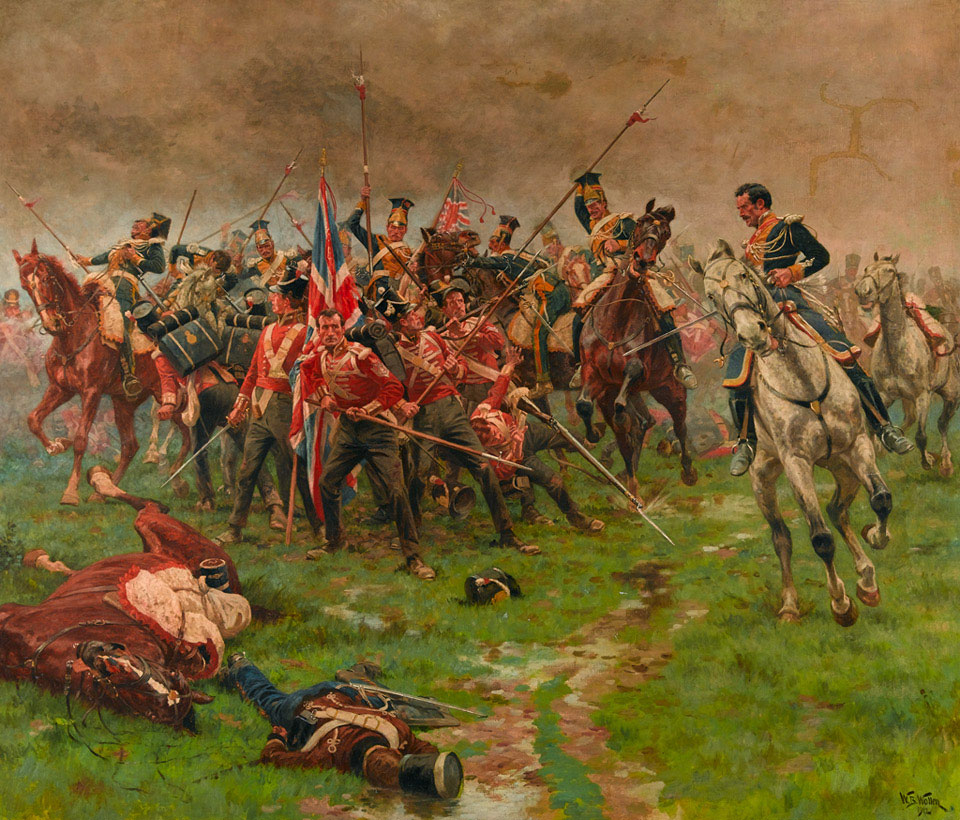
- Artist: William Barnes Wollen
- Year: 1912
- Medium: Oil on canvas
- Dimensions: 196 cm × 173 cm (77.1 in × 68.1 in)
- Location: National Army Museum, London

The Battle of Albuera is a 1912 historical battle painting by the British artist William Barnes Wollen. It depicts the Battle of Albuera fought in Extremadura, Spain on 16 May 1811 during the Peninsular War. The Allied Army under the Anglo-Irish general William Carr Beresford fought the French in a bloody but indecisive battle.

The painting shows the 3rd Foot regiment rallying round their regimental colours as they are attacked by French cavalry. It was exhibited at the Royal Academy's 1912 Summer Exhibition at Burlington House. It is now in the collection of the National Army Museum in Chelsea.

== See also ==
- Portrait of Lord Beresford, 1815 painting by William Beechey of the Allied commander at Albuera

== Bibliography ==
- Dempsey, Guy. Albuera 1811: The Bloodiest Battle of the Peninsular War. Frontline Books, 2008.
- Gilbey, Tresham. Baily's Magazine of Sports and Pastimes, Volume 97. Vinton, 1912.
