= Mike Martin (British politician) =

British politician

Michael Martin MP
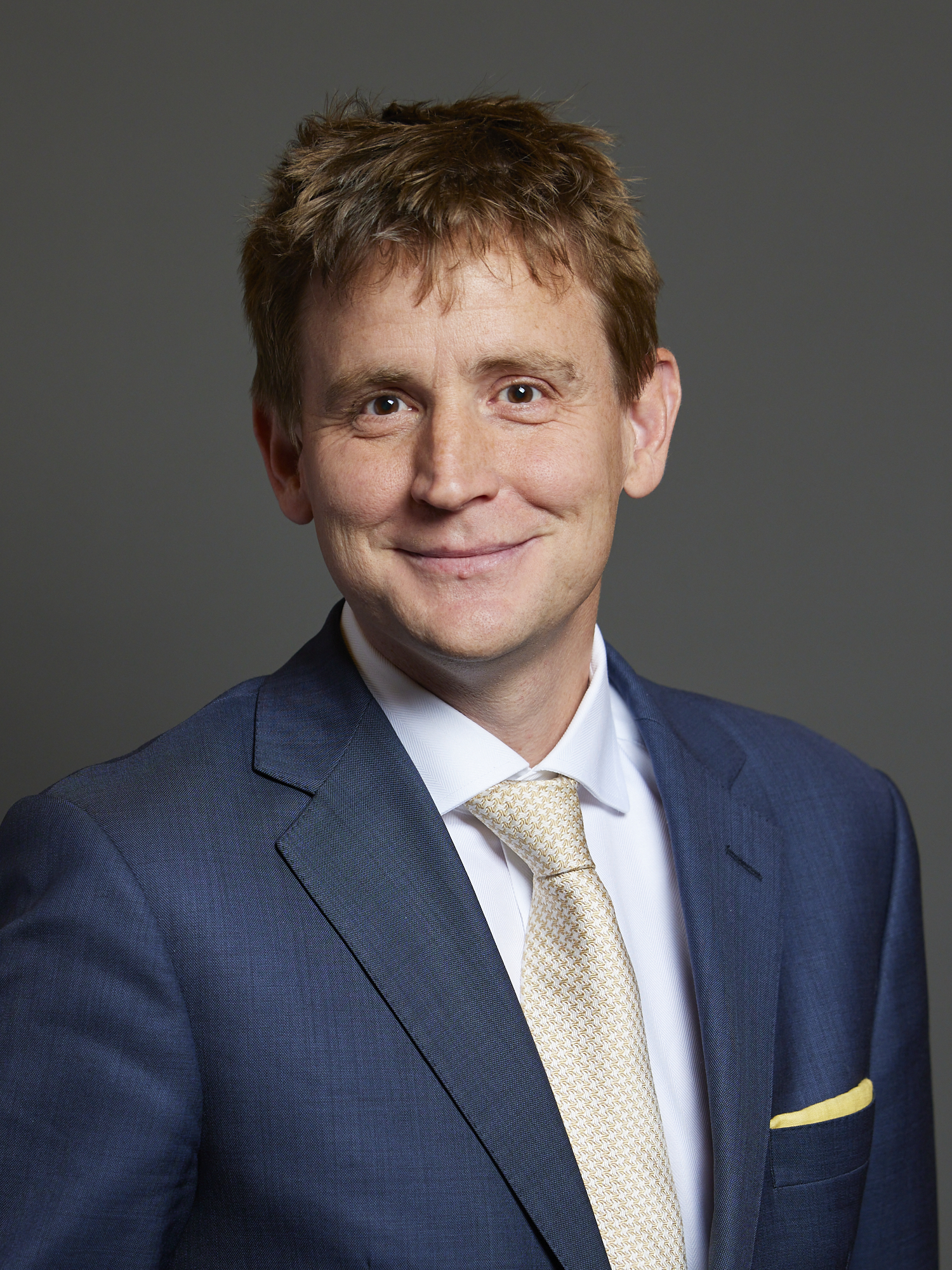
- Official portrait, 2024

Member of Parliament for Tunbridge Wells
- Incumbent
- Assumed office 4 July 2024
- Preceded by: Gregory Clark
- Majority: 8,687 (16.0%)

Personal details
- Born: Michael Peter Martin
- Party: Liberal Democrats
- Education: University of Oxford (MA); King's College London (PhD)
- Website: mike-martin.co.uk

Military service
- Allegiance: United Kingdom
- Branch/service: British Army; Territorial Army
- Years of service: 2004–2014
- Rank: Captain
- Unit: Royal Yeomanry; Intelligence Corps
- Battles/wars: War in Afghanistan

Academic background
- Thesis: War on its Head: An Oral History of the Helmandi Conflict 1978–2012 (2013)

Dr. Michael Peter Martin is a British politician, author and former Army officer, who has served multiple tours in Afghanistan. Martin has been a Member of Parliament (MP) for Tunbridge Wells since 2024. A member of the Liberal Democrats, he gained the seat vacated by Greg Clark, the Conservative MP who stood down at the 2024 election. Martin is the first Liberal Democrat MP ever to be elected in Kent. Martin identifies as pro-European, internationalist, pro-business, "explicitly pro-green", and as being in favour of a strong stance on defence.

== Early life and education ==
Martin, who was privately educated, has an undergraduate degree in biological sciences from the University of Oxford and a Doctor of Philosophy (PhD) degree in war studies from King's College London, which he completed in 2013 with a thesis titled "War on its Head: An Oral History of the Helmandi Conflict 1978-2012".

As of 2024, he is a senior visiting research fellow at King's College London.

Martin’s first job was as a dishwasher in a hotel when he was 16 years old.

== Military service ==
On 1 August 2004, Martin was commissioned into the General List of the Territorial Army as a second lieutenant (on probation). On 26 November 2006, he transferred to the Royal Yeomanry. His commission was confirmed on 26 November 2006 with seniority in the rank of second lieutenant from 26 November 2005. He was promoted to lieutenant on 26 November 2007. He was promoted to captain on 22 April 2010 with seniority from 15 June 2009. He transferred to the Intelligence Corps on 19 August 2013.

Martin worked as a Political Officer while in Helmand Province and dealt directly with the Taliban. Martin speaks Pushtu and pioneered the British Military’s Cultural Advisor programme. The programme trained Pushtu-speaking British officers to develop and leverage relationships with Afghan community leaders, including members of the Taliban. Martin also advised four UK commanders of the Task Force Helmand on local population dynamics.

While serving, the Ministry of Defence (MoD) commissioned Martin to write a PhD thesis on recent history and conflict in Helmand, Afghanistan. The MoD tried to block the publication of Martin’s critical account of British involvement, claiming that its publication was in breach of the Official Secrets Act. Martin resigned from his commission in 2014 so he could publish the full account in his book 'An intimate war: an oral history of the Helmand conflict, 1978-2012'.

== Career ==
=== Business ===
After leaving the army, Martin became a research director, working for a risk management company in Somaliland and Myanmar (formerly Burma). During his tenure, he started up a new division that assisted multinational clientele to develop a strategy to navigate the political and cultural intricacies of emerging markets.

=== International NGO ===
Later, Martin worked for international NGO Common Purpose in senior global management positions for two years.

=== UK Foreign Office ===
Martin also briefly worked at the Foreign Office.

=== Writing ===
Martin has authored a number of books on conflict, psychology and travel that have been translated and sold internationally. In 2014, Martin published An Intimate War, which was also translated into Russian. In 2016, he published Crossing the Congo, which was translated into German. In 2018, Martin published Why We Fight, which was translated into Estonian. Martin’s most recent work How to Fight a War was published in Russia, Germany, Taiwan, Brazil, South Africa, and South Asia.

Royalties from An Intimate War are given to charities that support education in Afghanistan and mental health support for British service personnel.

== Expeditions ==
=== Crossing the Congo ===
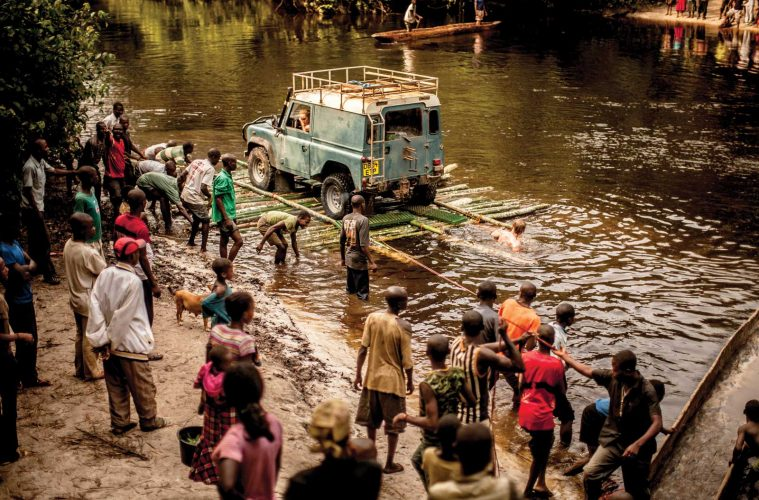
Martin and the group uses a bamboo raft to cross the Ngali River in the Democratic Republic of Congo.

In 2013, Martin traversed the Congo River Basin alongside two friends in a D-reg Land Rover. Having completed the 2,500-mile journey between the Western capital Kinshasa to Juba in South Sudan, the group believes that they were the first to drive across the Democratic Republic of Congo independently in a car since 1960. They later wrote and published an account of their journey Crossing the Congo: over land and water in a hard place in which they described being imprisoned by Congolese soldiers, AK47s being pointed into their necks and avoiding kidnap from the Lord’s Resistance Army. They also had to build rafts to float their land rover across rivers.

=== Walking The West Bank ===
In 2010 Martin walked the length of the West Bank in Palestine sleeping in olive groves at night. During his time there, Martin met with both Palestinians and Israeli settlers.

=== Sailing around the World ===
Martin bought a sailing boat and travelled around the world with his now wife. They got married on the deck of the boat. While travelling, they shortly lived in Australia and Fiji during the global COVID-19 pandemic. Following the pandemic, they both returned to Martin’s wife’s hometown of Tunbridge Wells.

== Political career ==
In February 2022, Martin was selected to be the Liberal Democrat candidate for Tunbridge Wells. In the 2024 general election, he was elected as Member of Parliament (MP) for Tunbridge Wells with 43.6 per cent of the vote and a majority of 8,687 over the second-placed Conservative candidate. The Labour candidate came fourth. He was the first non-Conservative to win the constituency since it was first contested in February 1974 and the first non-Conservative to represent the town of Royal Tunbridge Wells in Parliament since 1910.

== Parliamentary career ==
Martin is campaigning to improve local GP services, businesses in the town centre of Tunbridge Wells, as well as ensure there is sufficient infrastructure for new housing. He is also campaigning to increase Britain’s defence capabilities and believes that successive governments have failed in their defence and security strategies.

Martin made his maiden speech titled An Ode to Tunbridge Wells on the 3rd September 2024, in which he lauded the famous ability of ‘Tunbridge Wellians’ to write to newspaper letter pages with their views. He also spoke of the upcoming 2024 Subbuteo World Cup that was hosted in Tunbridge Wells. The popular tabletop football game was originally invented in his constituency and early production began in Langton Green.

Referring to his time as a former British Army Officer, Martin warned against Britain lacking a national geopolitical strategy and defence capabilities, and criticised successive British Governments for having “no strategy” during its War in Afghanistan.

In January 2025 Martin brought a motion to Parliament calling on the Government to look at seizing $300 billion in frozen Russian financial assets in held in central banks across Europe to aid Ukraine in the Russo-Ukrainian war. MPs voted unanimously in favour of his motion. That followed an open letter led by Martin and signed by British MPs and politicians from allied countries calling for the Government to work out how to seize frozen Russian financial assets.

Martin has been a repeated critic of the Russian regime and its invasion of Ukraine in 2022, which led him to being sanctioned by Russia on the 25th April 2025.

Martin tabled an amendment to the Government’s Crime and Policing Bill that sought to bring into force the Protection Against Sex-Based Harassment in Public Act 2023, which criminalises the harassment of women in public. The Act was originally a Private Members Bill sponsored by Martin’s predecessor Greg Clark.

In the House of Commons, Martin regularly raises issues pertaining to defence, national security and businesses.

=== Defence Select Committee ===
Martin was appointed member of the Defence Select Committee on the 29th October 2024. In post, he has criticised the Government’s 2025 Strategic Defence Review, describing it as “jam tomorrow” and saying that it will fail to grow Britain’s “tiny” military, and has said that the Government should increase defence spending to 3% of GDP.

=== Joint Committee on the National Security Strategy ===
Martin was appointed member of the Joint Committee on the National Security Strategy on the 6th December 2024.

Martin referred Reform UK’s Zia Yusuf to the Home Secretary for a possible breach of the terrorism act after Yusuf said that a Reform UK government would look at giving money to the Taliban as part of a migrant returns agreement.

=== 2025 Tunbridge Wells Water Outage ===
On 29 November 2025, Royal Tunbridge Wells and parts of Pembury experienced a water outage after it was discovered that water being treated at South East Water’s Pembury Water Treatment Plant might not be safe to consume. As a result, 24,000 households and businesses in the area were left without a water supply for six days.

Martin strongly criticised the leadership and communication from South East Water (SEW) during the crisis and called for the resignation of South East Water’s CEO, Dave Hinton. Martin campaigned for increased compensation for affected businesses, with total losses estimated to be millions of pounds. On the sixth day of the crisis, Martin called on the Government to provide an £18.5 million “Covid-style” recovery package for local businesses that were facing supply issues.

Martin was praised by Andrew Hunter Murray for his work scrutinising South East Water on a live episode of Page 94, the Private Eye Podcast, at Hay Festival in 2026. Murray made the comments after being asked by a member of the audience if there were any politicians that he admired.

== Selected Works ==
- Martin, Mike (2014). An intimate war: an oral history of the Helmand conflict, 1978-2012. London: C Hurst & Company. ISBN 978-1849043366.
- Martin, Mike; Baker, Chloe; Hatch-Barnwell, Charlie (2016). Crossing the Congo: over land and water in a hard place. London: Hurst & Company. ISBN 978-1849046855.
- Martin, Mike (2018). Why we fight. London: Hurst & Company. ISBN 978-1849048897.
- Martin, Mike (2023). How to fight a war. London: Hurst & Company. ISBN 978-1787389304.

Parliament of the United Kingdom
Preceded by Greg Clark	Member of Parliament for Tunbridge Wells; 2024–present	Incumbent
