= William Beresford, 1st Viscount Beresford =

Anglo-Portuguese General (1768–1854)

General The Right Honourable The Viscount Beresford GCB GCH PC
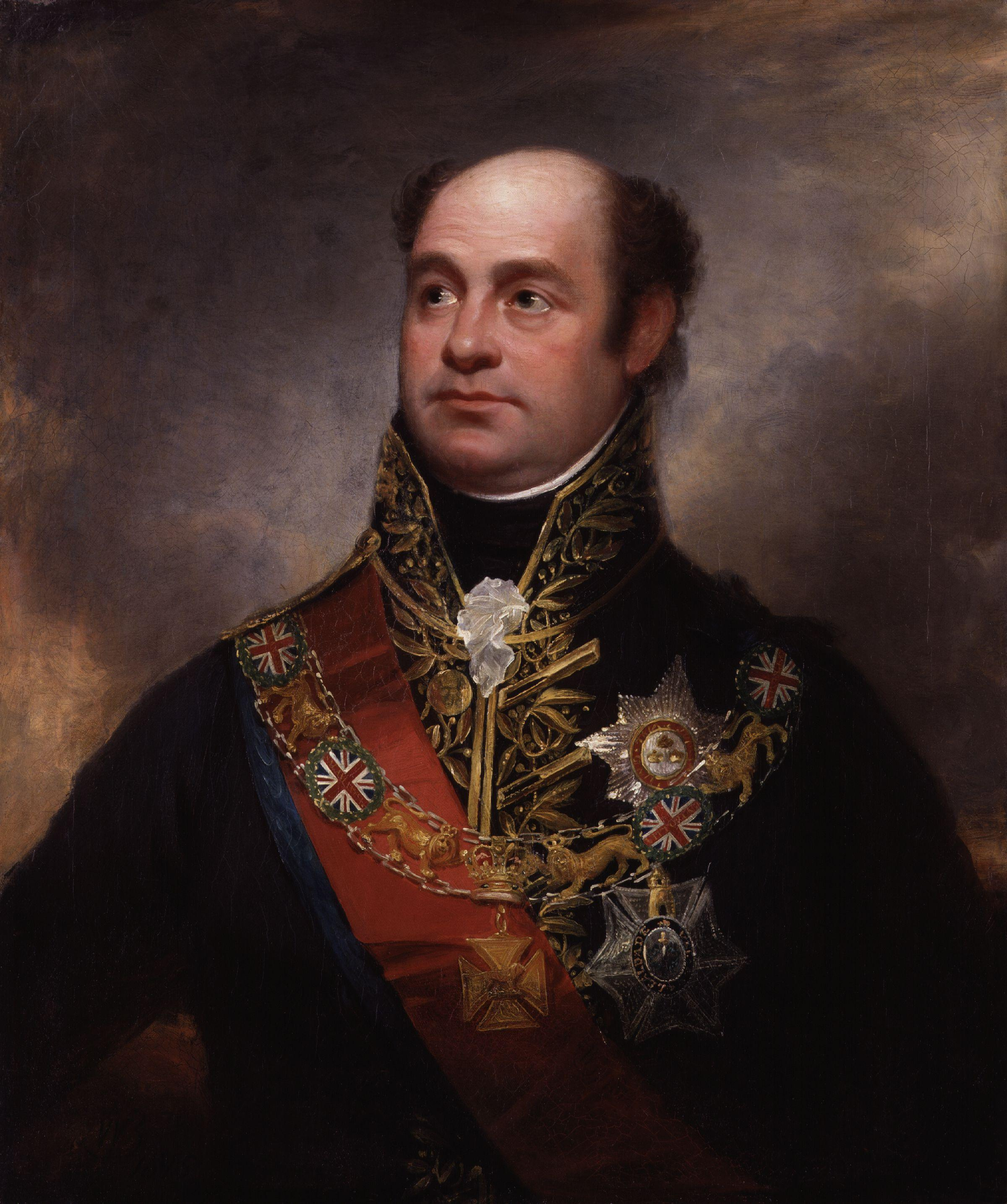
- Portrait of Lord Beresford by William Beechey, 1815
- Born: 2 October 1768; Bedgebury Cross, Kent, England
- Died: 8 January 1854 (aged 85); Kilndown, Kent, England
- Burial place: Christ Church, Kilndown; 51.090735°N 0.426909°E
- Military career
- Allegiance: Kingdom of Great Britain; British Empire; Kingdom of Portugal
- Branch: Army
- Service years: 1785–1830
- Rank: General (UK); Field marshal (Portugal)
- Commands: Master-General of the Ordnance
- Conflicts: War of the First Coalition; The Egyptian Campaign; British invasions of the River Plate: Peninsular War; • Battle of Albuera
- Other work: Governor of Jersey; Governor of Royal Military Academy

William Carr Beresford, 1st Viscount Beresford, GCB, GCH, PC (/ˈkɑːr ˈbɛrɪsfərd/; 2 October 1768 – 8 January 1854) was a British army officer and politician. A general in the British Army and a Marshal in the Portuguese Army, he fought alongside the Duke of Wellington in the Peninsular War and held the office of Master-General of the Ordnance in 1828 in the First Wellington ministry. He led the 1806 failed British invasion of Buenos Aires.

== Early life ==
William Beresford was born on 2 October 1768, the illegitimate son of George Beresford, 2nd Earl of Tyrone. Beresford received his early education in Yorkshire before in 1785 he was sent to Strasbourg, where he attended a French military academy.

== Early campaign experience ==
William Carr Beresford surrenders to Santiago de Liniers in Buenos Aires, 1806

Having spent several months at the military academy, on 27 August the same year Beresford joined the British Army as an ensign in the 6th Regiment of Foot. Beresford was initially stationed with his regiment in Ireland, before in 1786 he travelled with it to join the garrison in Nova Scotia. While on a hunting excursion there an accident resulted in him being blinded in his left eye and scarred on the face. Beresford continued on with the 6th in Nova Scotia after this, before on 25 June 1789 he was promoted to lieutenant in the 16th Regiment of Foot.

Beresford was then promoted to captain on the unattached list of the army on 24 January 1791, subsequently joining the 69th Regiment of Foot in Ireland on 31 May. When the French Revolutionary Wars began in February 1793, Beresford and his regiment were seconded as marines to the Mediterranean Fleet of the Royal Navy. In this capacity he served through the Siege of Toulon between August and December. Still with the fleet, Beresford then formed part of the force that invaded Corsica in February 1794 alongside a group of Corsican patriots. A naval bombardment failed to destroy the French-held Torra di Mortella, and so Beresford led a storming party ashore that captured the tower from the landward side. The impressive defence of the position led to the British adopting the Martello Tower themselves.

Subsequent to this Beresford was promoted to major on 1 March and then lieutenant-colonel on 11 August, in command of the 124th Regiment of Foot, a regiment raised from his father's Waterford estates. The 124th was disbanded in the following year and Beresford instead joined the 88th Regiment of Foot on 16 September. He sailed with the 88th to join the West Indies Campaign in November 1796, but his convoy was dispersed by a storm and only three of the 88th's companies, alongside the surgeon James McGrigor, reached the West Indies. Beresford and the rest of the regiment were sent to garrison Jersey, where they stayed for the next three years. On 1 January 1800 Beresford was promoted to colonel and the 88th was ordered out to India, landing at Bombay later in the year.

Beresford's regiment was sent to Egypt in 1801 to fight in the Egypt Campaign, serving from March to October when hostilities ended. The Peace of Amiens ended in May 1803 and the Napoleonic Wars began, and on 11 February 1804 Beresford was appointed a brigadier-general. The Cape of Good Hope, previously occupied by the British, had been given back to the Dutch in the peace. Beresford was part of the force that recaptured it at the Battle of Blaauwberg in January 1806, commanding a detachment that landed 16 miles (26 km) north of Cape Town.

From there, he crossed the South Atlantic to South America to invade the River Plate region with a force of 1,500 men, departing on 14 April 1806. Buenos Aires was occupied for 46 days. However, the British force could not maintain itself against the army gathered by Santiago de Liniers. After a two-day fight between 10 and 12 August 1806, the British were forced to capitulate. Beresford was a prisoner for six months before escaping and arriving in England in 1807.

== Peninsular War ==
Equestrian portrait of Beresford in Portuguese uniform by Henrique José da Silva, 1811

=== Commander in Chief of the Portuguese Army ===
In that same year Beresford was sent to Madeira, which he occupied in name of Queen Maria I of Portugal, remaining there for six months as Governor and Commander in Chief. The exiled Portuguese Government in Rio de Janeiro, Brazil, whereto the Portuguese Royal Family had set up a court in exile, realised the necessity of appointing a commander-in-chief capable of training, equipping and disciplining the demoralised Portuguese Royal Army. The Portuguese government asked Britain to appoint Arthur Wellesley to this role; Wellesley indicated he could not do the role justice due to his prior engagements and recommended Beresford. He was appointed Marshal and Commander in Chief of the Army by Decree of 7 March 1809 and took the command on 15th of the same month. At that time, French Marshal Jean-de-Dieu Soult had already crossed into Portugal where he occupied Porto. Beresford quickly overhauled the Portuguese forces, bringing them in line with British discipline and organization, and from the General Headquarters (then at the Largo do Calhariz), he dispatched many "daily orders" altering points of the infantry ordnance, creating a general command of artillery, establishing the separation of the battalions, firing incompetent or corrupt officers and promoting or appointing appropriate replacements.

=== On campaign ===
On 22 April 1809 Sir Arthur Wellesley, later Duke of Wellington, disembarked in Lisbon, and took over the command of all the Anglo-Portuguese troops whereupon Beresford was nominated commander of the Portuguese Army. The allied armies marched to the North. Wellington moved from Coimbra directly to Porto, which he entered on 12 May, and Beresford marched through the Province of Beira, arriving that same day at the banks of the Douro river, in the area of Lamego. Wellington's troops made a forced crossing of the Douro and defeated the French, forcing Marshal Soult to withdraw from Porto. Soult was outnumbered and expelled from Portugal; the positioning of Beresford's forces compelled the French to leave Portugal by the poor roads through Montalegre. They managed to cross the border only after sacrificing their artillery and baggage, and faced numerous difficulties during the evacuation.

The Second French Invasion of Portugal was defeated and the allied armies moved back to the South, the British concentrating at Abrantes and the Portuguese at Castelo Branco. With the intention of cooperating with the Spanish against Marshal Claude Victor-Perrin, duc de Bellune, the Anglo-Portuguese forces under Wellesley moved into Spain in the Talavera campaign while Beresford remained on the Águeda river covering the Spanish-Portuguese border. After Wellesley's return, now as Viscount Wellington, following the Battle of Talavera, Beresford re-entered Portugal, where he distributed the army at various locations and established his General Headquarters in Lisbon. From Lisbon he dispatched numerous orders and instructions for the reform of the Portuguese military.

In the same year (1809), and the one following he made tours of inspection of the corps that were found quartered in the various provinces and he corrected any defects he noticed and established rules for the functioning of the different branches of the military service. In this way he improved the functioning of the Portuguese Army so that they might face the forces of Napoleon invading the country for the third time. The beneficial results of his efforts were proven at the campaign against Marshal André Masséna in particular at the Battle of Buçaco on 27 September 1810 where the Portuguese troops played a prominent part, and also in the defence of the Lines of Torres Vedras).

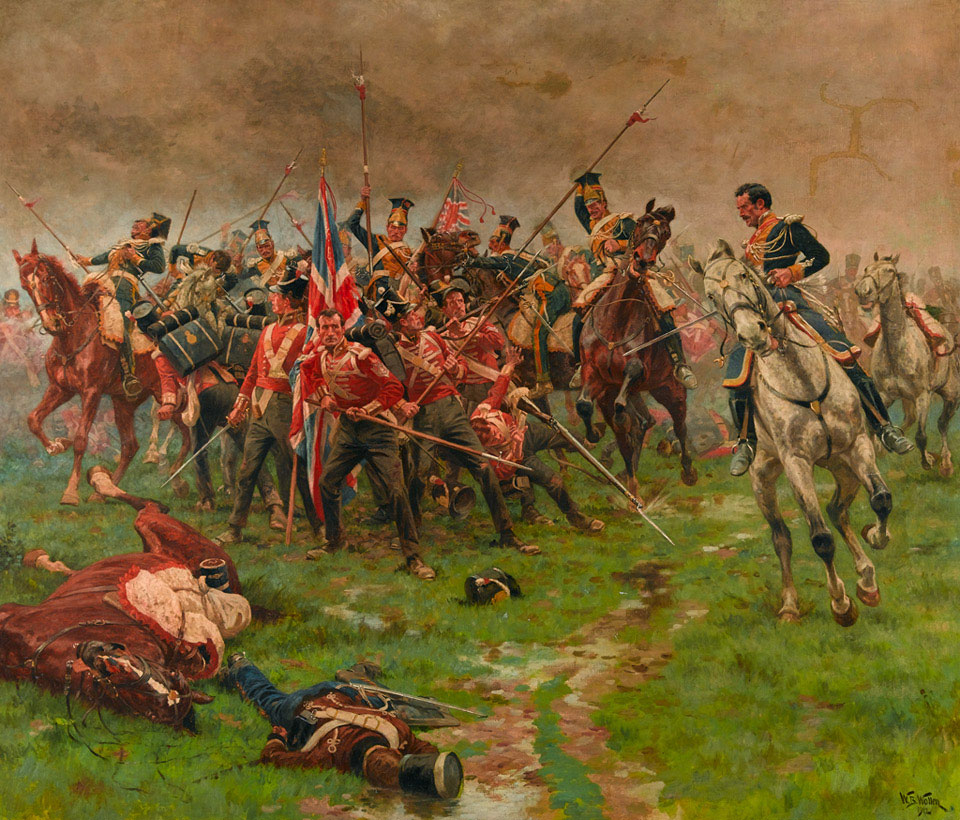
The Battle of Albuera by William Barnes Wollen

The most notable action in which Beresford held independent command occurred in 1811 when a combined Anglo-Portuguese and Spanish army under his command, intercepted a French army commanded by Marshal Soult, who had been ordered by Marshal Auguste de Marmont to move to protect the important Spanish fortress-city of Badajoz. As the French forces retreated from the Lines of Torres Vedras, Beresford marched towards Badajoz, which he laid siege to. Having, however, received notice that Soult was approaching, he lifted the siege and posted his army at Albuera in a defensive position. There he fought the French forces on 16 May 1811. After the bloody Battle of Albuera the French were forced to retreat, though the siege of Badajoz had to be subsequently abandoned. Meanwhile, on 13 May 1811, he was created Count of Trancoso in Portugal by decree of Prince Regent John.

At the beginning of July 1811, Beresford was again in Lisbon, but he was subjected to fits of "nervous breakdowns", as described by Brigadier Benjamin D'Urban, Quartermaster-general of the Portuguese Army. He recuperated in February 1812 and then joined Wellington in his investment of Ciudad Rodrigo. Once the fortified town had fallen, he went with the army to Alentejo, and participated in the Anglo-Portuguese Siege of Badajoz. After Badajoz had been stormed, along with Wellington he once again took up position on the Águeda, and from there launched the Salamanca campaign. On 22 July 1812, the important Battle of Salamanca was fought, giving the Anglo-Portuguese forces a decisive victory over the French under Marshal Marmont. In the battle Beresford was badly wounded under his left breast while ordering the advance of one of the Portuguese brigades.

He retired to Lisbon, had bouts of fever and was half incapacitated for several months until May of the next year (1813). Meanwhile, he was also created Marquis of Campo Maior in Portugal by Prince Regent John on 17 December 1812. In March he was confirmed as second in command of the Allied Army and re-joined the campaigning army before assisting in the liberation of Spain by the British and Portuguese armies.

In the invasion of France, he assisted Wellington at the command of a corps and was hailed as the liberator of Bordeaux. He fought in France at Toulouse, the last clash of the Peninsular War. During that conflict he had been present at the battles of A Coruña, Busaco, Albuera, Badajoz, Salamanca, Vitoria, the Pyrenees, Nivelle, Nive, Orthez and Toulouse. His Peninsular Gold Medal had seven clasps - only the Duke of Wellington, with nine clasps, had more to his medal.

== Later career ==
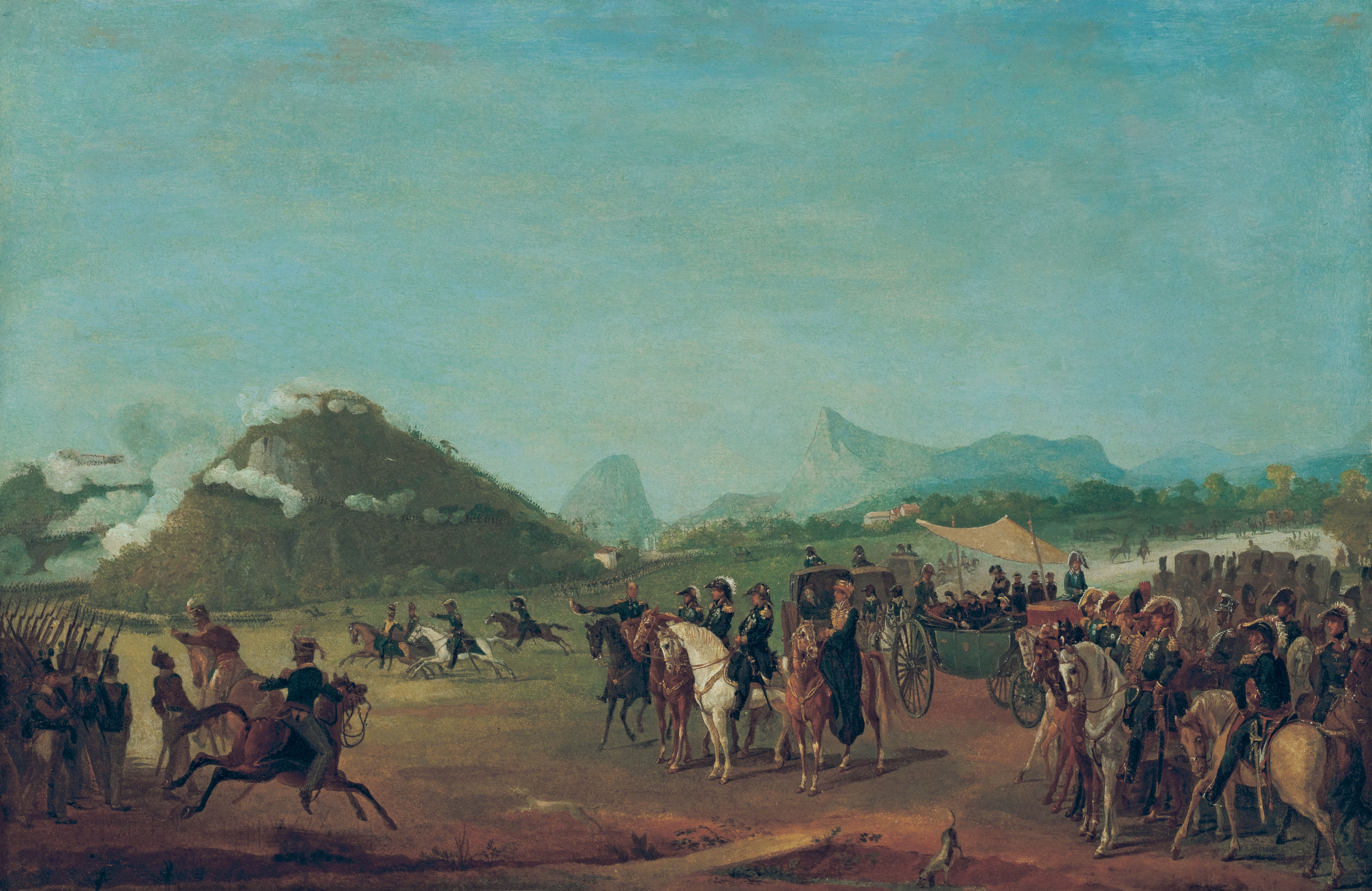
Review of the troops destined for Montevideo in Praia Grande, Niterói. In the center, King John VI on a white horse, and to his left, pointing a bicorne, is Beresford. Painting by Debret, c. 1816

After peace was declared he went to England on leave and came back again to Lisbon to reassume the command of the Portuguese Army. He did not limit himself, however, to that role, and intended to intervene in the general politics of the country, from this he came into conflict with the Regency. He then determined to go to the Court in Rio de Janeiro. He departed there in August 1815 and returned in September 1816, invested with wider powers than the ones which he had previously enjoyed. Beresford took a high hand in his dealings with Gomes Freire de Andrade (1817) and, put into a difficult situation, he returned to Brazil, obtaining from John VI the confirmation of the powers he had already attained, which he desired to see amplified.

When he returned to Portugal, the Liberal Revolution of 1820 intervened; the British officers, for the most part, had been discharged, and the government would not even consent that Beresford could disembark. He was made Governor of Jersey in 1821 and held the position till 1854, the last titular Governor of Jersey; since his death the Crown has been represented in Jersey by the Lieutenant Governor of Jersey.

He was given the colonelcy of three regiments in succession. He was Colonel of the 69th (South Lincolnshire) Regiment of Foot from 1807 to 1819, the 88th Regiment of Foot (Connaught Rangers) from 1819 to 1823 and the 16th (Bedfordshire) Regiment from 1823 until his death. Briefly returning to Portugal in November 1826 at the request of the Regent, Infanta Isabel Maria of Braganza, he gave up his ambitions because of the resistance he encountered among the new Portuguese elite and returned to Britain in February 1827.

In the 1840s, Beresford expanded the Bedgebury Estate near Goudhurst, Kent. He built the hamlet of Kilndown to the north west of Bedgebury.

== Legacy ==
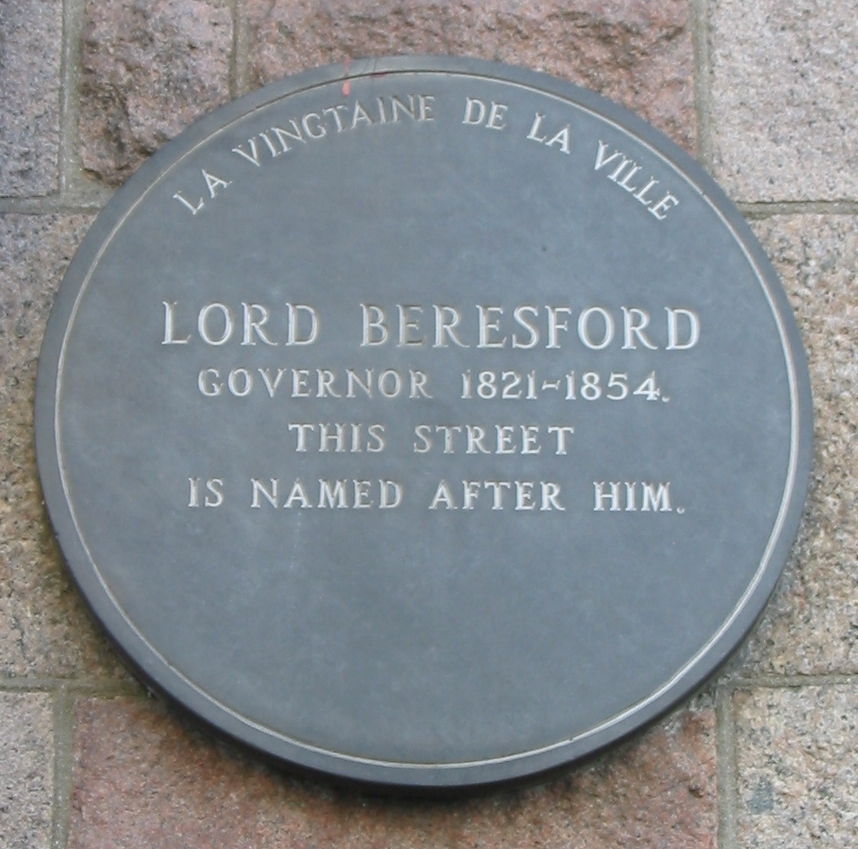
William Beresford, 1st Viscount Beresford, was the last titular Governor of Jersey

Napier, in his History of the Peninsular War, severely criticised the tactics of Beresford at the Battle of Albuera, which gave origin to a heated correspondence between the Marshal and the historian. The published letters of Beresford which are mentioned below refer to this controversy. Wellington himself had no illusions over Beresford's ability as a General, but he appreciated his abilities as a military organiser, and recommended that Beresford should take command if he himself were disabled. He published: Strictures on Certain Passages of L. Col. Napier's History of Peninsular War; Further Strictures; Refutation of Col. Napier's Justification, London, 1831–1834, 3 Vol.; Letter to Charles Edward Long, Esq. on the Extracts Recently Published from the Ms. Journal and Private Correspondence of the Late Lieut-Gen. R. B. Long, London, John Murray, 1833; A Second Letter to Charles Edward Long, Esq. on the Ms. Journal and Private Correspondence of the Late Lieut. General R. B. Long (1834). Also of interest is the Colecção das Ordens do Dia (Collection of Orders of the Day) produced by Beresford's general headquarters nos Anos de 1809 a 1823 (for the years 1809 to 1823), Lisbon, 13 Vol. (at the Library of the English Institute of the University of Coimbra).

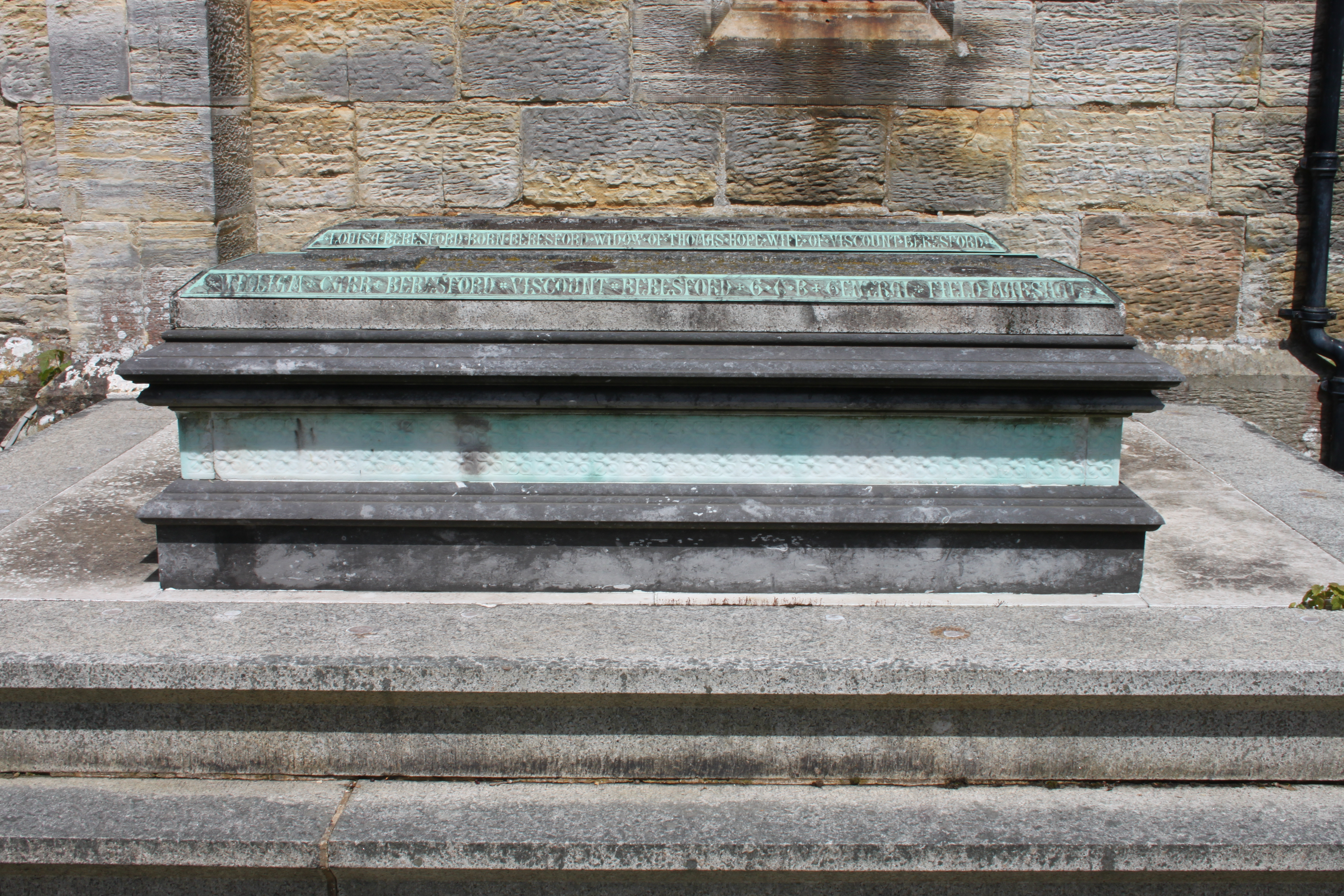
Graves of William Carr Beresford GCB and his wife

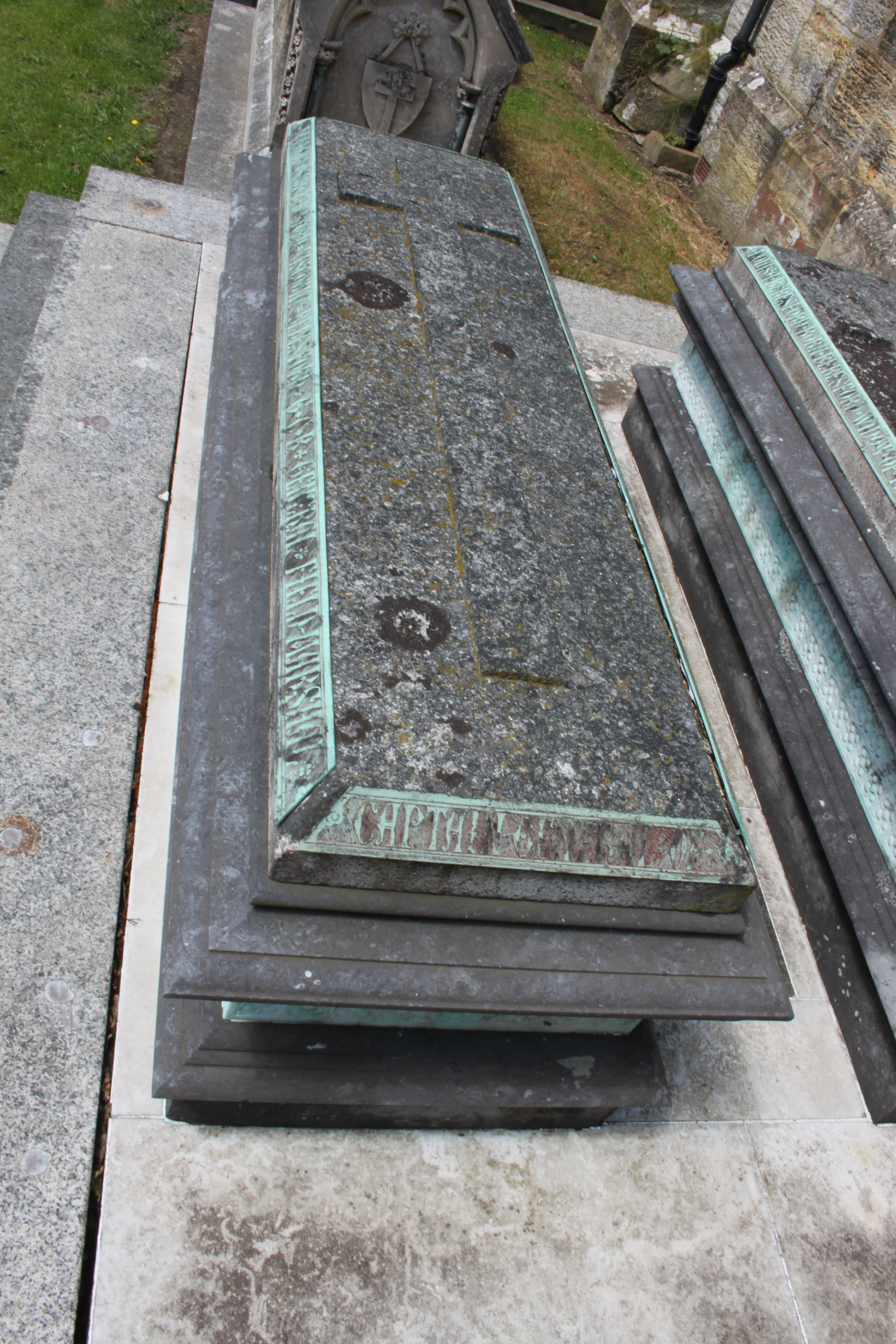
Grave of William Carr Beresford GCB

As a reward for his services in the fight against the French he was raised to the peerage as Baron Beresford, of Albuera and Dungarvan in the County of Waterford, on 3 May 1814. On 28 March 1823 he was further honoured when he was made Viscount Beresford, of Beresford in the County of Stafford. Beside many national and foreign honours and decorations he received the Grand Cross of the Portuguese Order of the Tower and Sword. Some authors infer that he also had the title of 1st Duke of Elvas; but no document recording the granting of this title is extant. Beresford County, New South Wales, Australia was named in his honour.

He is the namesake of Beresford, New Brunswick.

== Parliament ==
Beresford was Member of Parliament (MP) for County Waterford from a by-election on 28 June 1811 to 25 April 1814, just before being raised to his peerage.

He was sworn of the Privy Council in 1821.

== Family ==
In Portugal, Beresford had a romantic involvement with his military secretary António Lemos Pereira de Lacerda and his wife Dona Maria da Luz Willoughby da Silveira. The three lived together in Palácio da Ega, nowadays housing the Arquivo Histórico Ultramarino. Beresford recognised two of Maria's children, Guilherme (1812) and Maria Effigenia (1816). He also had a child with an unknown mother, Maria (1818).

Lord Beresford married his first cousin the Honourable Louisa, widow of Thomas Hope and daughter of William Beresford, 1st Baron Decies and Elizabeth Fitzgibbon, in 1832. The marriage was childless. She died in July 1851. Lord Beresford died in January 1854, aged 85. The barony and viscountcy became extinct on his death. His estates were passed on to his stepson, Alexander Beresford Hope. Beresford's Portuguese titles were not renewed, although his nephews continued using them.

== Arms ==
Coat of arms of William Beresford, 1st Viscount Beresford
| Notes Granted 1 July 1811. Confirmed 18 March 1854 by George Harrison, Windsor Herald. Crest Issuant from a mural crown Or a dragon's head per fess wavy Azure and Gules the lower part of the neck transfixed by a broken spear in the mouth the remaining part of the spear the point upwards Or. Escutcheon Argent semee of cross crosslets fitchee three fleurs-de-lis two and one Sable within a bordure wavy Pean. Motto Nil Nisi Cruce |

== See also ==
- List of marquisates in Portugal
- List of countships in Portugal
- Beresford Gate
- Beresford Square

== Sources ==
- The Fatal Hill: The Allied Campaign under Beresford in Southern Spain in 1811, Mark Sunderland, Thompson Publishing, London 2002, Long Review, ISBN 0-9522930-7-2
- Heathcote, T. A. (2010). Wellington's Peninsular War Generals & Their Battles. Barnsley, South Yorkshire: Pen & Sword Military. ISBN 978-184884-061-4.
- Henriques, Mendo Castro, Salamanca – 1812 Companheiros de Honra, Lisboa, 2006, 2nd edition,
- Zúquete, Afonso Eduardo Martins, Nobreza de Portugal e do Brasil (3 Volumes), Volume Second, p. 474-7, Lisbon, 1960.
- de la Poer Beresford, Marcus (2020). "Marshal William Carr Beresford and the Return to Portugal of the Portuguese Royal Family (1814-1830)" (PDF). Journal of Anglo-Portuguese Studies (29): 67–87, 248. ISSN 0871-682X.

Parliament of the United Kingdom
| Preceded by John Claudius Beresford; Richard Power | Member of Parliament for County Waterford; 1811 – 1814; With: Richard Power to 1814; Richard Shapland Power 1814 | Succeeded by Richard Shapland Power; Lord George Beresford |
Military offices
| Preceded by Sir Hildebrand Oakes, Bt | Lieutenant-General of the Ordnance; 1823–1824 | Succeeded by Sir George Murray |
| Preceded by The Marquess of Anglesey | Master-General of the Ordnance; 1828–1830 | Succeeded by Sir James Kempt |
| Preceded by Hugh Mackay Gordon | Colonel of the 16th (Bedfordshire) Regiment; 1823–1854 | Succeeded by Thomas Erskine Napier |
| Preceded by Sir Cornelius Cuyler, 1st Baronet | Colonel of the 69th (South Lincolnshire) Regiment of Foot; 1819–1823 | Succeeded by Sir John Hamilton, 1st Baronet, of Woodbrook |
| Preceded by John Reid | Colonel of the 88th Regiment of Foot (Connaught Rangers); 1807–1819 | Succeeded by Sir Gordon Drummond |
Peerage of the United Kingdom
| New creation | Baron Beresford; 1814–1854 | Extinct |
| New creation | Viscount Beresford; 1823–1854 | Extinct |
Portuguese nobility
| New creation | Count of Trancoso; 1811–1854 | Extinct |
| New creation | Marquis of Campo Maior; 1812–1854 | Extinct |
