= Kilndown =

Village in Kent, England

Coordinates: 51.088870°N 0.430140°E

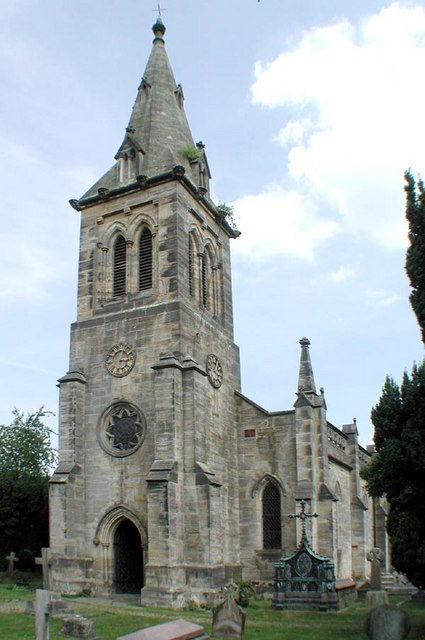
- Christ Church, Kilndown

- Location within Kent
- Civil parish: Goudhurst
- District: Tunbridge Wells
- Shire county: Kent
- Region: South East
- Country: England
- Sovereign state: United Kingdom
- Post town: Cranbrook
- Postcode district: TN17
- Police: Kent
- Fire: Kent
- Ambulance: South East Coast
- UK Parliament: Tunbridge Wells

Kilndown is a village 5 miles (8 km) west of Cranbrook in Kent, England. It is in the civil parish of Goudhurst.

== History ==
Two estates existed near the village. The Bedgebury Estate was mentioned in an 814 charter and was a known home to the Culpeper family in the 16th century. The estate contained two Iron Furnaces to help defeat the Spanish Armada in 1588.

The Combwell Estate was formed during the reign of King Henry II by Robert de Thurnham, who founded a Premonstratensian Abbey, which became an Augustinian Priory, Combwell Priory, in 1220.

Kilndown first appears on Hasted's map in 1778 but was referenced as "Killdown"; the "Kiln" in the current name may have come from the kiln oasts harvested in the area, or that the area produced bricks.

Kilndown was established in the 1840s by the British general and politician, William Beresford, 1st Viscount Beresford, who purchased the estate in 1834. This led to its development, including craftsmen, shops, a public house. Christ Church, Kilndown was built in 1841.
