= Franz Xaver Eggert =

German glass painter

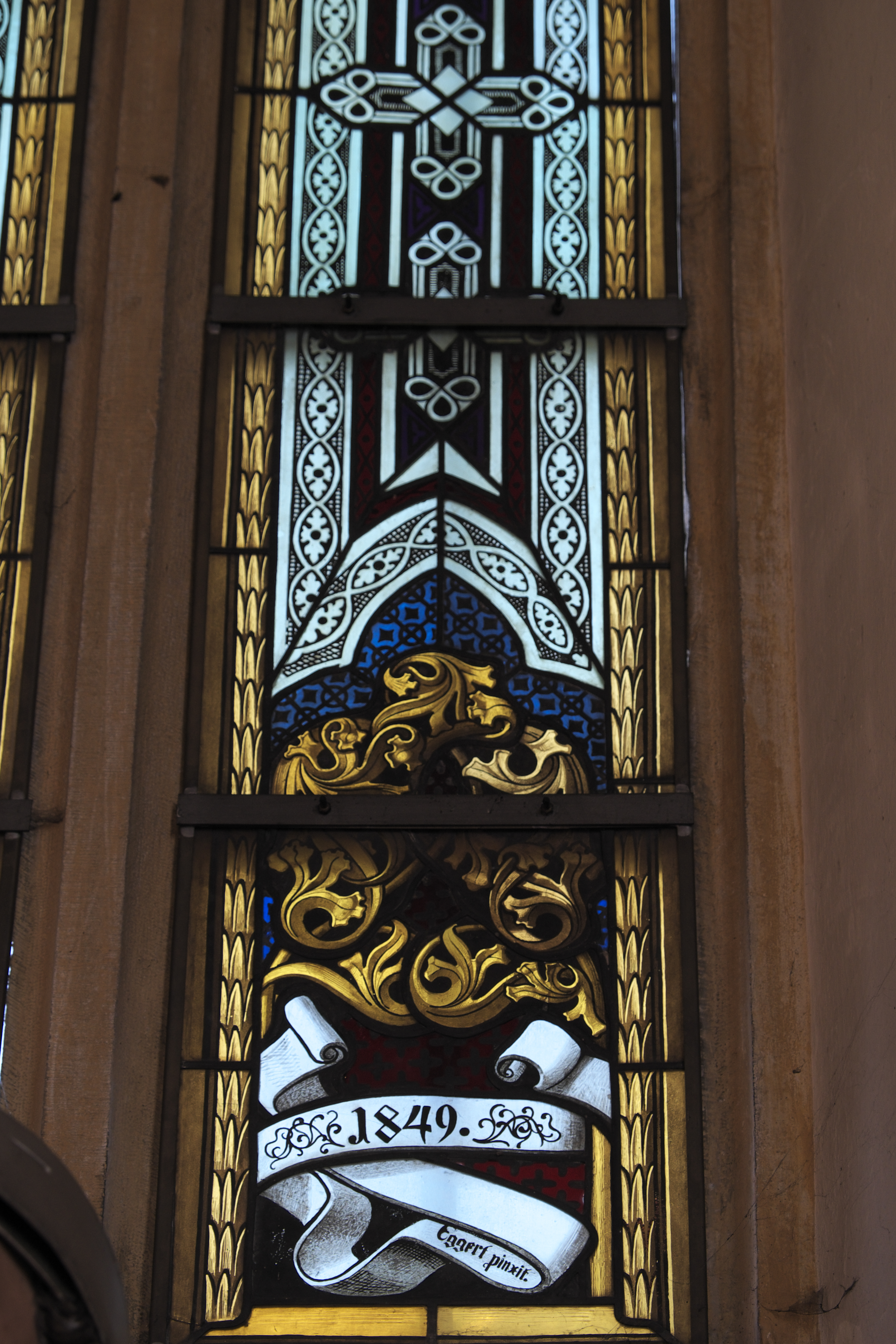
Stained glass window in Eggert's hometown Höchstädt on the Danube.

Franz Xaver Eggert (11 November 1802 – 14 October 1876) was a German glass painter.

== Life ==
Eggert was born at Höchstädt on the Danube, and studied decorative painting at Augsburg and Munich; but he afterwards devoted himself entirely to glass-painting, in conjunction with Ainmiller, Hammerl, and Kirchmair, and endeavoured to raise the art from its long decline. He especially distinguished himself by the magnificence of his ornamentation. His best works are in the new church of the suburb Au at Munich, in the cathedrals of Cologne and Ratisbon, and in several churches at Basle, Constance, etc. In 1840 he designed a scheme of stained glass windows depicting various saints at Christ Church, Kilndown in the English county of Kent. He died at Munich in 1876.

== See also ==
- List of German painters
