= Greg Clark =

British Conservative politician

The Right Honourable Greg Clark
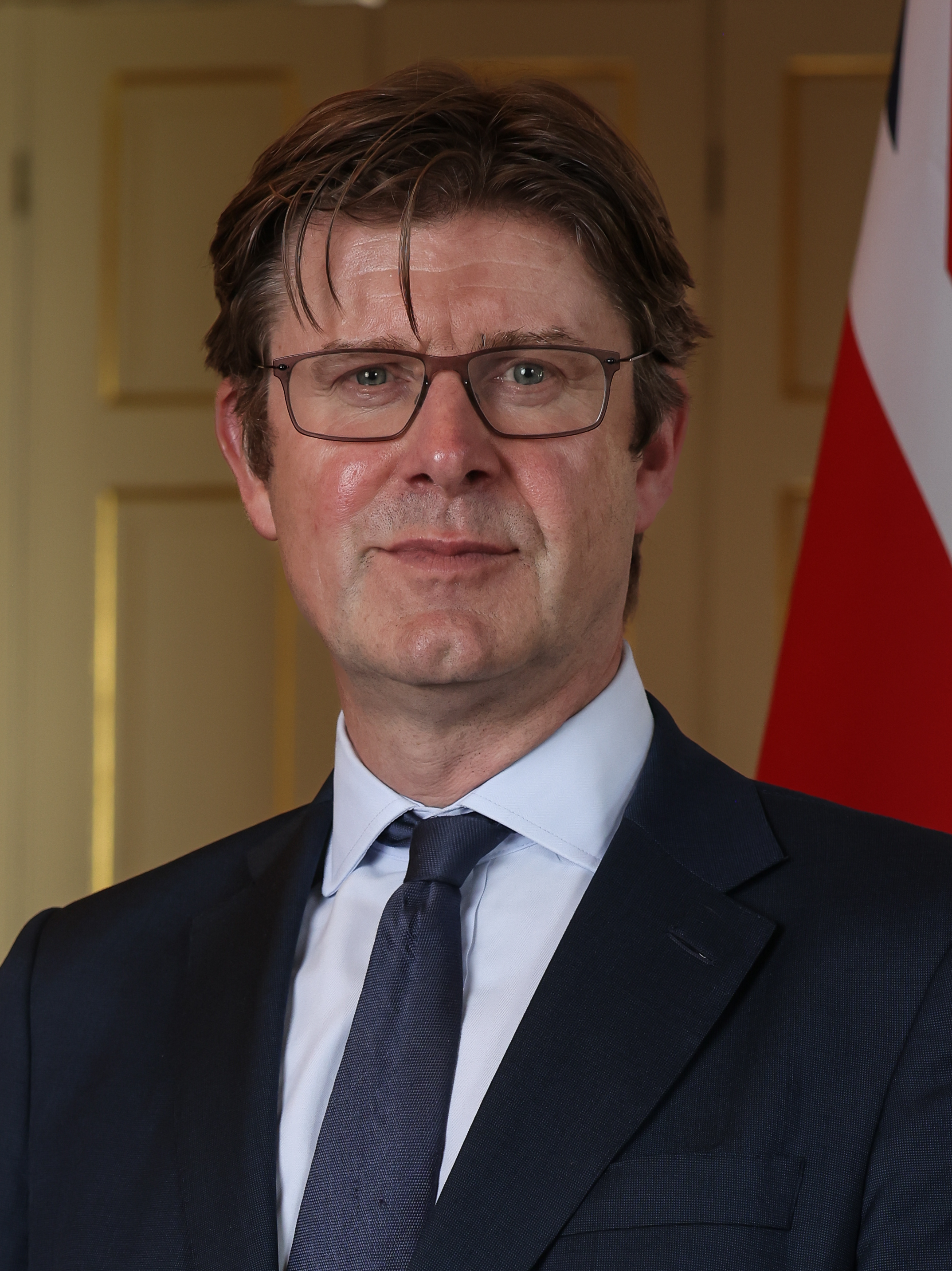
- Official portrait, 2022

Chair of the Science, Innovation and Technology Select Committee (Note: Science and Technology (2020-2023))
- In office 29 January 2020 – 30 May 2024 (Note: Office vacant from 7 July to 11 October 2022)
- Preceded by: Norman Lamb
- Succeeded by: Chi Onwurah

Secretary of State for Levelling Up, Housing and Communities (Note: Communities and Local Government (2015–2016))
- In office 7 July 2022 – 6 September 2022
- Prime Minister: Boris Johnson
- Preceded by: Michael Gove
- Succeeded by: Simon Clarke
- In office 11 May 2015 – 14 July 2016
- Prime Minister: David Cameron
- Preceded by: Eric Pickles
- Succeeded by: Sajid Javid

Secretary of State for Business, Energy and Industrial Strategy
- In office 14 July 2016 – 24 July 2019
- Prime Minister: Theresa May
- Preceded by: Sajid Javid (Note: Also assumed the responsibilities of Secretary of State for Energy and Climate Change, Amber Rudd.)
- Succeeded by: Andrea Leadsom

President of the Board of Trade
- In office 15 July 2016 – 19 July 2016
- Prime Minister: Theresa May
- Preceded by: Sajid Javid
- Succeeded by: Liam Fox

Minister of State for Universities, Science and Cities
- In office 15 July 2014 – 11 May 2015
- Prime Minister: David Cameron
- Preceded by: David Willetts
- Succeeded by: Jo Johnson

Minister of State for Cities and Constitution
- In office 7 October 2013 – 15 July 2014
- Prime Minister: David Cameron
- Preceded by: Chloe Smith
- Succeeded by: Sam Gyimah

Financial Secretary to the Treasury City Minister
- In office 4 September 2012 – 7 October 2013
- Prime Minister: David Cameron
- Preceded by: Mark Hoban
- Succeeded by: Sajid Javid

Minister of State for Decentralisation
- In office 13 May 2010 – 4 September 2012
- Prime Minister: David Cameron
- Preceded by: Office established
- Succeeded by: Nick Boles

Shadow Secretary of State for Energy and Climate Change
- In office 6 October 2008 – 11 May 2010
- Leader: David Cameron
- Preceded by: Position established
- Succeeded by: Ed Miliband

Member of Parliament for Tunbridge Wells
- In office 5 May 2005 – 30 May 2024
- Preceded by: Archie Norman
- Succeeded by: Mike Martin

Member of Westminster City Council for Warwick
- In office 2002–2005

Personal details
- Born: Gregory David Clark; 28 August 1967 (age 58) Middlesbrough, North Riding of Yorkshire, England
- Party: Conservative (1988–present) (Note: Whip suspended from 3 September 2019 to 29 October 2019.)
- Other political affiliations: SDP (before 1988)
- Spouse: Helen Clark
- Children: 3
- Education: Magdalene College, Cambridge; London School of Economics
- Website: www.gregclark.org

Academic background
- Thesis: The effectiveness of incentive payment systems: An empirical test of individualism as a boundary condition (1992)

Gregory David Clark (born 28 August 1967) is a British politician who served as Secretary of State for Business, Energy and Industrial Strategy from 2016 to 2019. He also was Secretary of State for Communities and Local Government from 2015 to 2016 and Secretary of State for Levelling Up, Housing and Communities from July to September 2022. Later, he was the Chair of the Science, Innovation and Technology Select Committee. A member of the Conservative Party, he served as Member of Parliament (MP) for Tunbridge Wells from 2005 until 2024.

Clark was born in Middlesbrough and studied Economics at Magdalene College, Cambridge, where he was president of Cambridge University Social Democrats. He then gained his PhD degree from the London School of Economics. Clark worked as a business consultant before becoming the BBC's Controller for Commercial Policy and then Director of Policy for the Conservative Party under Conservative leaders Iain Duncan Smith and Michael Howard from 2001 until his election to parliament in 2005.

Clark served in the Cameron-Clegg coalition as Minister of State in the Department for Communities and Local Government from 2010 to 2012, Financial Secretary to the Treasury from 2012 to 2013, and Minister of State for Cities and Constitution at the Cabinet Office from 2013 to 2014. Between July 2014 and May 2015, he held the post of Minister for Universities, Science and Cities. Following the 2015 general election, Prime Minister David Cameron promoted Clark to the Cabinet as Secretary of State for Communities and Local Government. In July 2016, he was appointed as Secretary of State for Business, Energy and Industrial Strategy by new Prime Minister Theresa May and remained in that role until 24 July 2019. He had the whip removed on 3 September 2019, for voting against the government, before it was restored on 29 October. In May 2022, he was named as the Prime Minister’s trade envoy to Japan by Boris Johnson. He ceased to be an MP in May 2024, when Parliament was dissolved for the 2024 general election, in which he decided not to stand.

== Early life and education ==
Gregory Clark was born in Middlesbrough on 28 August 1967 and attended St Peter's Roman Catholic School in South Bank. His father and grandfather were milkmen running the family business, John Clark and Sons, while his mother worked at Sainsbury's.

Clark read Economics at Magdalene College, Cambridge. He joined the Social Democratic Party (SDP) while at Cambridge and was an executive member of its national student wing, Social Democrat Youth and Students (SDYS) and, in 1987, president of Cambridge University Social Democrats. He then studied at the London School of Economics, where he was awarded his PhD degree in 1992 with a thesis titled The effectiveness of incentive payment systems: an empirical test of individualism as a boundary condition.

== Early career ==
After leaving university, Clark first worked as a business consultant for Boston Consulting Group, before becoming special advisor to the Secretary of State for Trade and Industry, Ian Lang, between 1996 and 1997. Subsequently, he was appointed the BBC's Controller, Commercial Policy, and was Director of Policy for the Conservative Party from 2001 until his election to parliament in May 2005.

Between 2002 and 2005, he was a councillor on Westminster City Council, representing Warwick ward and serving as Cabinet Member for Leisure and Lifelong Learning.

== Parliamentary career ==
Clark was selected as the Conservative prospective parliamentary candidate for Tunbridge Wells in December 2004. At the 2005 general election, Clark was elected as MP for Tunbridge Wells with 49.6% of the vote and a majority of 9,988.

He made his maiden speech on 9 June 2005, in which he spoke of the (then) forthcoming 400th anniversary of Dudley, Lord North's discovery of the Chalybeate spring and the foundation of Royal Tunbridge Wells, a town to which the royal prefix was added in 1909 by King Edward VII.

=== Shadow Cabinet ===
Clark was appointed to the front bench in a minor reshuffle in November 2006 by David Cameron, becoming Shadow Minister for Charities, Voluntary Bodies and Social Enterprise. Shortly after his appointment he made headlines by saying the Conservative party needed to pay less attention to the social thinking of Winston Churchill, and more to that of columnist on The Guardian, Polly Toynbee.

In October 2007, Clark campaigned to save Tunbridge Wells Homeopathic Hospital. In October 2008, Clark was promoted to the Shadow Cabinet, shadowing the new government position of Secretary of State for Energy and Climate Change.

=== Minister of State for Decentralisation ===
At the 2010 general election, Clark was re-elected as MP for Tunbridge Wells with an increased vote share of 56.2% and an increased majority of 15,576.

After the election, Clark was appointed a Minister of State in the Department for Communities and Local Government, with responsibility for overseeing decentralisation. In this role he called for the churches and other faith communities to send him their ideas for new social innovations for all, and made a major speech on "turning government upside down" jointly to the think tanks CentreForum and Policy Exchange. He was accused of hypocrisy, having staunchly opposed house-building while in opposition, while promising to impose it as a government minister.

In July 2011 he was appointed Minister for Cities. In this role he tried to promote the urban economies of the North, West and Midlands.

=== Financial Secretary to the Treasury ===
In a cabinet reshuffle in September 2012, Clark was appointed Financial Secretary to the Treasury and City Minister, while retaining the ministerial brief responsible for cities policy.

=== Minister for Universities, Science and Cities ===
On 15 July 2014 Clark was appointed to the role of Minister for Universities, Science and Cities, replacing David Willetts. The new portfolio combined the universities and science brief held by Willetts with the cities policy already handled by Clark.

His appointment was met with concerns about securing future funding for universities and questions over his public support for homoeopathic treatments.

=== Secretary of State for Communities and Local Government ===
At the 2015 general election, Clark was again re-elected with an increased vote share of 58.7% and an increased majority of 22,874. Clark returned to the Department of Communities and Local Government as Secretary of State on 11 May 2015.

=== Secretary of State for Business, Energy and Industrial Strategy ===
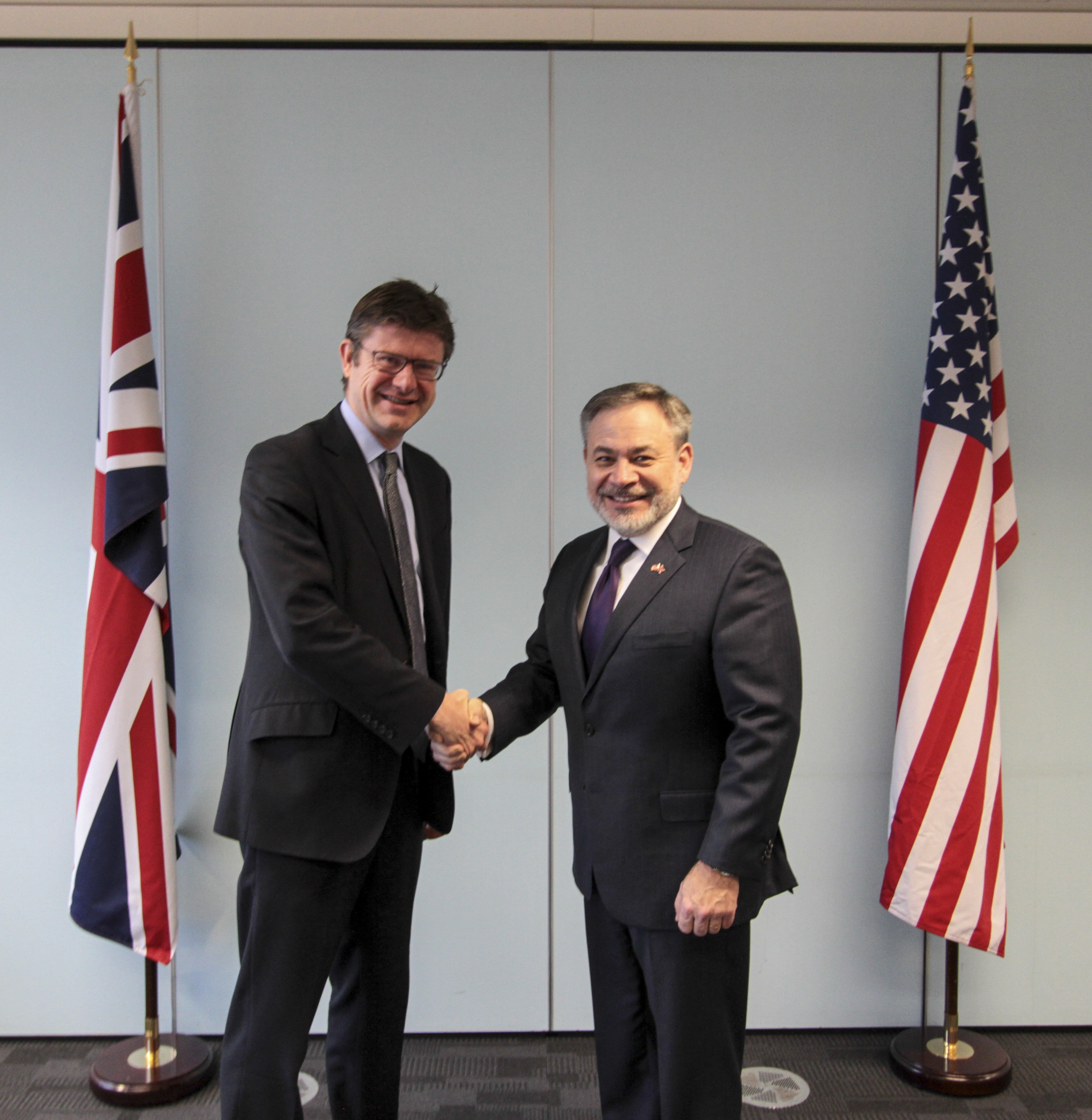
Clark and U.S. Deputy Secretary of Energy Dan Brouillette in 2018

Clark was appointed Secretary of State for Business, Energy and Industrial Strategy on 14 July 2016, in Theresa May's first cabinet. In October 2016, he appointed his predecessor as MP, Archie Norman, as Lead Non Executive Board Member for the Department for Business, Energy and Industrial Strategy.

In February 2017, Clark travelled to Paris, in order to meet executives from Peugeot and the French Government, due to the proposed takeover of Vauxhall Motors.

Clark was again re-elected at the snap 2017 general election, with a decreased vote share of 56.9% and a decreased majority of 16,465.

In May 2018, Clark suggested that 3,500 UK domestic jobs could be lost as a direct and explicit result of Brexit. Brexiteers, such as Jacob Rees-Mogg said this was a "revival of project fear". Clark argued in response that the job losses were 'substantiated' in the result of an inadequate customs union deal with the European Union, but stated that this did not include the transition/implementation period.

Clark opposed a no-deal Brexit, saying in June 2018: "People in good jobs up and down the country are looking to our national leaders to make sure a deal is approved. We are one of the world's leaders in the next generation of automotive technology. To see that slip through our fingers is something we would regret forever".

In January 2019, Clark, against the advice of Theresa May, suggested he might resign from Cabinet in the event of the United Kingdom not securing a deal with the European Union in Brexit negotiations. At the time he was the most senior minister to do so.

On 6 February 2019, Clark said to the Business, Energy and Industrial Strategy Committee that Theresa May had until 15 February to conclude Brexit negotiations in order to provide certainty to exporters to countries such as Japan because of the length of time that goods take to arrive. The EU-Japan free trade agreement would no longer apply to the UK in the event of a no-deal Brexit.

Under the tenure of Clark, who was responsible for workers' rights nationally, his department in London reportedly did not ensure that its staff, many of whom had been outsourced, were paid at least the London living wage. In February 2019, the staff went on strike for 26 hours. He was removed from his role in July 2019 by incoming Prime Minister Boris Johnson and returned to the backbenches.

=== Subsequent Political Career ===
==== Removal and restoration of Conservative whip ====
On 3 September 2019 Clark voted against the government on taking control of the House of Commons order paper to allow a bill to be debated in parliament which would stop a no-deal Brexit without explicit approval of parliament. He became an independent as the Conservative whip was withdrawn from him. On 29 October, the whip was restored to 10 former Conservative ministers, including Clark.

==== 2019 Election and brief return to Cabinet ====
Clark was again re-elected at the 2019 general election with a decreased vote share of 55.1% and a decreased majority of 14,645. In the aftermath of the July 2022 United Kingdom government crisis in which Boris Johnson announced his impending resignation as both Prime Minister and Leader of the Conservative Party, Johnson reappointed Clark to cabinet on an interim basis, allowing Clark to retain Chairmanship of the Science, Innovation and Technology Select Committee.

Clark stood down at the 2024 general election.

== Personal life ==
Clark and his wife Helen have three children, two girls and a boy. They live in Royal Tunbridge Wells. He is a member of the Roman Catholic church.

Parliament of the United Kingdom
Preceded by Archie Norman	Member of Parliament for Tunbridge Wells; 2005–2024	Succeeded by Mike Martin
Political offices
New office	Shadow Secretary of State for Energy and Climate Change; 2008–2010	Succeeded by Ed Miliband
New office	Minister of State for Decentralisation; 2010–2012	Succeeded by Nicholas Boles
Preceded by Mark Hoban	Financial Secretary to the Treasury (City Minister); 2012–2013	Succeeded by Sajid Javid
Preceded by Chloe Smith	Minister of State for Cities and Constitution; 2013–2014	Succeeded by Sam Gyimah
Preceded by David Willetts	Minister of State for Universities, Science and Cities; 2014–2015	Succeeded by Jo Johnson as Minister of State for Universities and Science
Preceded by Eric Pickles	Secretary of State for Communities and Local Government; 2015–2016	Succeeded by Sajid Javid
Preceded by Sajid Javid	President of the Board of Trade; 2016	Succeeded by Liam Fox
Preceded by Sajid Javid as Secretary of State for Business, Innovation and Skills	Secretary of State for Business, Energy and Industrial Strategy; 2016–2019	Succeeded by Andrea Leadsom
Preceded by Amber Rudd as Secretary of State for Energy and Climate Change	Secretary of State for Business, Energy and Industrial Strategy; 2016–2019	Succeeded by Andrea Leadsom
Preceded by Michael Gove	Secretary of State for Levelling Up, Housing and Communities; 2022	Succeeded by Simon Clarke
