= Archie Norman =

British businessman and politician

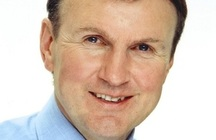

Shadow Secretary of State for Environment, Transport and the Regions
- In office 2 February 2000 – 18 September 2001
- Leader: William Hague
- Preceded by: John Redwood
- Succeeded by: Theresa May (Transport, Local Government and the Regions)

Member of Parliament for Tunbridge Wells
- In office 1 May 1997 – 11 April 2005
- Preceded by: Patrick Mayhew
- Succeeded by: Greg Clark

Personal details
- Born: 1 May 1954 (age 71) Dover, England
- Party: Conservative
- Spouse: Vanessa Norman (m. 1982)
- Children: 1 daughter
- Education: Charterhouse School, Surrey
- Alma mater: University of Minnesota, Twin Cities; Emmanuel College, Cambridge; Harvard Business School

Archibald John Norman (born 1 May 1954) is a British businessman and politician. As the chairman of Energis, he was the only person to have led an FTSE 100 company and served as a member of the House of Commons (MP) at the same time. From January 2010 to January 2016, Norman was the chairman of ITV plc. He succeeded Robert Swannell as chairman of Marks & Spencer in September 2017.

== Early life and education ==
Born the second of five sons of two doctors, Archie Norman was educated at Charterhouse, the University of Minnesota, Emmanuel College, Cambridge and (after a short period at Citigroup), at Harvard Business School, where he obtained an MBA.

== Career ==
=== Business career ===
Norman joined McKinsey & Company on graduation, where William Hague (future British Foreign Secretary) was one of his protégés. He was the youngest-ever partner at McKinsey aged 28. He then held directorships at Geest and Railtrack, before becoming group finance director at Britain's then largest retailer, Kingfisher plc at 32.

From 1991 until 1999, Norman was Chief Executive and then Chairman of Asda, the large supermarket chain, and with Allan Leighton, he is credited with turning it around, and making it the second largest in the United Kingdom, before its sale to Wal-Mart in July 1999.

In November 1999, he stepped down from the chain. In the early nineties, Norman was also chairman of The Children's Trust, and in 1998, he was succeeded by Sir Brian Hill.

=== Political career ===
During the 1980s, Norman stood unsuccessfully as a Conservative candidate in council elections in Southwark, London. In 1996, on the advice of Francis Maude, Norman decided to apply for the Conservative safe seat of Tunbridge Wells, soon to be vacated by Sir Patrick Mayhew.

Norman was elected as Conservative Member of Parliament for Tunbridge Wells in England, at the 1997 General Election, with a majority of 7,506. In December 1996, Labour warned that people voting for Norman would be short-changed, as he believed that being an MP was not a full-time job.

After the heavy Conservative defeat at the 1997 election, Norman supported William Hague's bid for leadership, becoming Chief Executive of the Conservative Party from July 1998 to June 1999. As Chief Executive he rationalised staffing at Conservative Central Office in Smith Square, sacking a third of the staff. He also proposed in a "Blueprint for change" plan that the election of party leader should be decided by party members, rather than MPs, and there should be a target of doubling membership.

He served as a shadow minister for the environment in 1999. From February 2000 to September 2001 he was Shadow Secretary of State for Environment, Transport and the Regions, where he was up against John Prescott on the Labour front bench.

In September 2001, after leaving the Shadow Cabinet, he founded the think tank Policy Exchange with Francis Maude. In July 2002, Norman became Chairman of Energis, having led a consortium of banks in the purchase and refinancing of the United Kingdom arm of Energis from the administrators. In October 2004, he announced his intention to step down as MP at the next general election, as he wished to pursue other interests.

In December 2004, Greg Clark was selected as the candidate to succeed him by the Conservative Party. In May 2005, Norman officially stood down as MP, prior to the general election.

In October 2016, Norman was appointed by the Department for Business, Energy and Industrial Strategy as its Lead Non Executive Board Member, with Clark as Secretary of State.

=== Return to business ===
On leaving Parliament, Norman set up Aurigo Management, a private equity firm primarily focussed on retail/consumer industries. In February 2004, he showed interest in becoming the chairman of Sainsbury's. In June 2005, he denied plans to take over the helm of Morrisons. In July 2007, Aurigo bought tool hire retailer HSS Hire for £310 million, from 3i. In November 2007, Norman advised Wesfarmers on the acquisition of Coles Group, and has since overseen the turnaround of Coles in Australia.

On 18 November 2009, Norman was named as the new chairman of ITV plc. In January 2016, it was announced he was to step down as chairman after six years. In July 2013, Lazard appointed him as its London chairman, as the firm worked on the privatisation of the Royal Mail. In December 2013, he was appointed chairman of Hobbycraft, replacing Simon Burke.

On 5 May 2017, it was announced Norman would succeed Robert Swannell as chairman of Marks & Spencer in September 2017.

== Other ==
He is on the Board of the NIESR, has an Honorary Degree from Leeds Metropolitan University, was a Director of the Judge Institute, has been elected to the Marketing Society Hall of Fame, and been voted Retailer of the Year and Yorkshire Businessman of the Year. In December 2010, he was granted the Institute of Turnaround Professional Lifetime Achievement Award. In June 2015, he teamed up with The X Factor host Simon Cowell in launching a new show, entitled The F Factor.

== Personal life ==
Married with one daughter, he has homes in Yorkshire, London and the small island of Lismore on the west coast of Scotland. His interests include farming, opera, fishing and tennis. He bought a pied-à-terre in Tunbridge Wells while MP.

In July 2004, The Independent reported he owned a REVA G-Wiz to commute around London, and outside London, he drove a Volkswagen Golf.

Parliament of the United Kingdom
Preceded by Patrick Mayhew	Member of Parliament for Tunbridge Wells; 1997–2005	Succeeded by Greg Clark
Political offices
Preceded by John Redwood	Shadow Secretary of State for the Environment, Transport and the Regions; 2000–2001	Succeeded by Theresa May as Shadow Secretary of State for Transport, Local Government and the Regions
