= Christ Church, Kilndown =

Christ Church
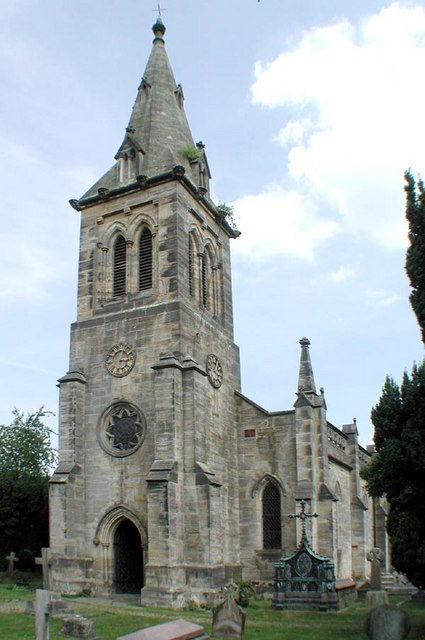
- Christ Church viewed from the west in 2001
- Christ Church
- 51.0908°N 0.4270°E
- OS grid reference: TQ 70060 35187
- Location: Church Road, Kilndown, Kent TN17 2SF
- Country: England
- Denomination: Church of England

History
- Status: Parish church
- Consecrated: 15 April 1841

Architecture
- Functional status: Active
- Heritage designation: Grade I listed
- Architect: Anthony Salvin
- Style: Gothic Revival
- Completed: 1839

Administration
- Province: Canterbury
- Diocese: Canterbury
- Deanery: Weald
- Benefice: Goudhurst and Kilndown

Christ Church is a Church of England parish church in Kilndown, Kent, England. It was built in 1839 under the commission of William Beresford, 1st Viscount Beresford, and was substantially reordered in the early 1840s in accordance with the principles of the Cambridge Camden Society (later the Ecclesiological Society). Its layout and rich interior decoration, contributed by a range of major architects of the era, made it "a showcase" of the influential Society's ideas: John Betjeman described the church as "a museum of the Camden Society". It was severely damaged by bombing during the Second World War, but has been restored. It is a Grade I listed building.

== History ==
Christ Church was commissioned by Viscount Beresford, who was a Field Marshal under Arthur Wellesley, 1st Duke of Wellington in the Napoleonic Wars. at a cost of £2500. It was originally designed as a chapel-of-ease for the nearby St Mary's Church, Goudhurst, but an Act of Parliament established it as its own independent Church of England parish in 1843. This Act, which was associated with the various Church Building Acts passed in the first decades of the 19th century, was passed on 24 February 1843. It described the parish of Goudhurst as having 2,850 residents but only one parish church (St Mary's), with a capacity of 750, and the new chapel of ease (Christ Church) with 413 seats, 313 of which were free (pew rents did not apply). The Act then created the "Chapelry District of Kilndown", consisting of the southwestern part of St Mary's parish. This district later became a parish in its own right. The church was consecrated on 15 April 1841; Archbishop of Canterbury William Howley led the service.

Anthony Salvin was commissioned to design the church. The result was a plain Gothic "sandstone box" of little architectural merit: architectural historian Roger Homan states that the work subsequently undertaken at the direction of Viscount Beresford's stepson Alexander Beresford Hope "rescued and transformed ... a commonplace country church". Beresford Hope was a founder member of the Cambridge Camden Society (later the Ecclesiological Society), which prized "the truth and beauty" of architecturally correct Gothic Revival forms in Anglican church architecture, and was committed to its study and application. Over the course of five years from March 1840 he directed substantial alterations "in accordance with Ecclesiological principles", with particular emphasis on the interior, the east end and the chancel. Beresford Hope called in various high-profile architects to assist with the renovation. Anthony Salvin constructed the stone altar based upon the tomb of William of Wykeham at Winchester Cathedral. William Whewell advised on the design of the windows which were made in Munich-style stained glass and ordered from the Kingdom of Bavaria. Alexander Roos and Thomas Willement painted the chancel screen while William Butterfield designed the lectern.

The church suffered from damp because of the porous nature of its sandstone walls, so the murals inside were whitewashed over in the 20th century. During the Second World War, it was reported on 13 December 1940 that German bombs had recently fallen near the church, damaging 18 of the stained glass windows and dislodged some of the roof tiles. The windows were insured for £30,000 however the insurance did not cover damage from air raids. It was granted Grade I listed status in 1980. Between 2009 and 2020, the future Bishop of St Germans Hugh Nelson was the vicar of Christ Church.

== Architecture ==
Christ Church is built of sandstone quarried in Kilndown village. It consists of a wide but low nave and chancel with buttressed walls and with no internal structural division or aisles, a vestry, and a tall two-stage west tower with corner buttresses and topped with a broach spire of stone. The main entrance, the west door, is elaborately arched with a hood mould and complex ironwork. Above this is a rose window; all the other windows are lancets. Inside, the church has a low, wide, "stringy" hammerbeam roof, considered by the Cambridge Camden Society as a particularly unsympathetic feature of the original "mean and bad" interior. The 1840 work partly concealed this behind a pierced parapet. There is an extensive set of stained glass windows: most were by German stained glass designer Franz Xaver Eggert and depict the Virgin Mary with Christ in her arms, Saints Peter and Paul and various saints associated with Britain. William Slater designed the reredos in 1869; it was carved by J.F. Redfern.

The architects employed by Beresford Hope to renovate the church were among the most important of the early Victorian era and included two of the "darlings of the [Cambridge Camden] Society": Richard Cromwell Carpenter, who designed the chancel screen and choir stalls, and William Butterfield, who was responsible for the lectern, the pulpit (adjacent to the vestry, and modelled on one at Beaulieu Abbey) and a "distinctive" brass candelabra. Accordingly, the church "became an object of national interest" as a test-bed for the Cambridge Camden Society's theories and an exemplar of its ideas. Richard Cromwell Carpenter's son Richard Herbert Carpenter and his architectural partner Benjamin Ingelow designed Beresford Hope's tomb, which is separately listed at Grade II and is located immediately outside the south wall.

== See also ==
- Website of Christ Church, Kilndown
- Grade I listed buildings in Tunbridge Wells (borough)
- List of new churches by Anthony Salvin
- List of places of worship in Tunbridge Wells (borough)
- Media related to Christ Church, Kilndown at Wikimedia Commons

== Bibliography ==
- Homan, Roger (1984). The Victorian Churches of Kent. Chichester: Phillimore & Co. ISBN 0-85033-466-7.
- Newman, John (1969). West Kent and the Weald. Buildings of England (1st ed.). Harmondsworth: Penguin Books. ISBN 978-0-300-09614-9.
