= Portrait of Lord Beresford =

Painting by William Beechey

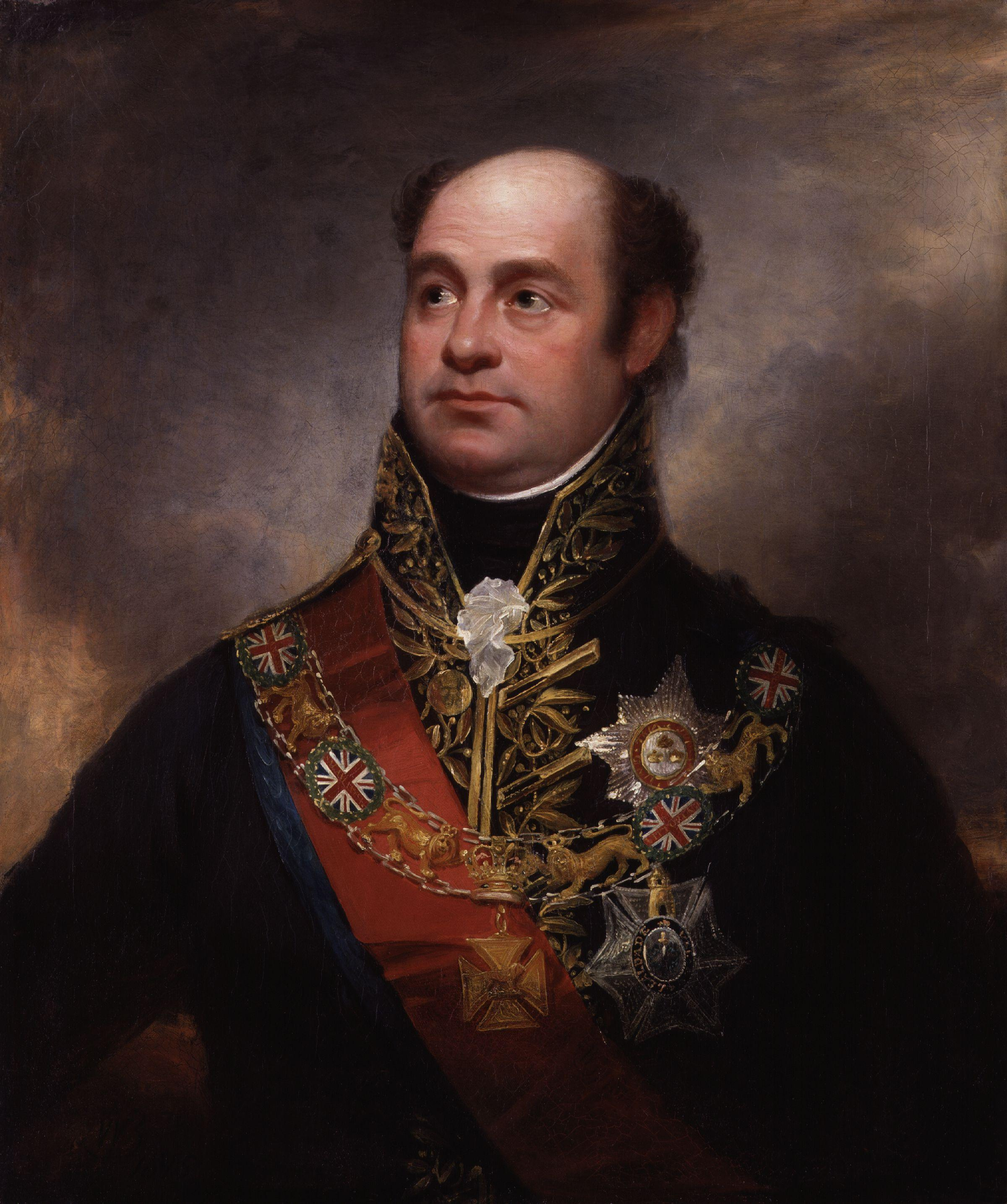
- Artist: William Beechey
- Year: 1814–15
- Type: Oil on canvas, portrait
- Dimensions: 76.7 cm × 65 cm (30.2 in × 26 in)
- Location: National Portrait Gallery, London

Portrait of Lord Beresford is an oil on canvas portrait painting by the English artist William Beechey of the British general William Beresford, 1st Viscount Beresford. It was created in 1814-1815.

== History and description ==
The sitter was born in 1768 as the illegitimate son of the Irish aristocrat George Beresford, 1st Marquess of Waterford and therefore had links to many of the Anglo-Irish elite. Entering the British Army he became known for his service during the Napoleonic Wars. He was involved in the Egyptian Campaign and the failed expedition to Buenos Aires. He distinguished himself in the Peninsular War and was made Marshal of the Portuguese Army, serving under the Duke of Wellington. In 1814 he was made Viscount Beresford.

Along with Thomas Lawrence and Martin Archer Shee, Beechey had emerged as one of Britain's leading portrait painters following the death of the President of the Royal Academy Joshua Reynolds. He increasingly adapted his style to suit the fashion of the Regency era, dominated by Lawrence. Beresford sat for Beechey not long after the Treaty of Paris drove Napoleon into exile on Elba. Beresford is shown in the uniform of a Marshal of Portugal and wears the decorations of Peninsular Gold Cross as well as the British Order of the Bath and the Portuguese Order of the Tower and Sword. Today the painting is in the collection of the National Portrait Gallery on Trafalgar Square. A mezzotint print by Charles Turner based on Beechey's work is also in the Gallery's collection.

== Bibliography ==
- Beresford, Marcus de la Poer. Marshal William Carr Beresford. Merrion Press, 2018.
- Bowen, Desmond & Bowen, Jean. Heroic Option: The Irish in the British Army. Pen and Sword, 2005.
- Roberts, William. Sir William Beechey, R. A. Duckworth and Company, 1907.
- Saywell, David & Simon, Jacob. Complete Illustrated Catalogue. National Portrait Gallery 2004.
- Walker, Richard John Boileau. Regency Portraits, Volume 1. National Portrait Gallery, 1985.
