= Groombridge Place =

Manor house in Speldhurst, Kent, UK

Coordinates: 51°07′06″N 0°11′26″E

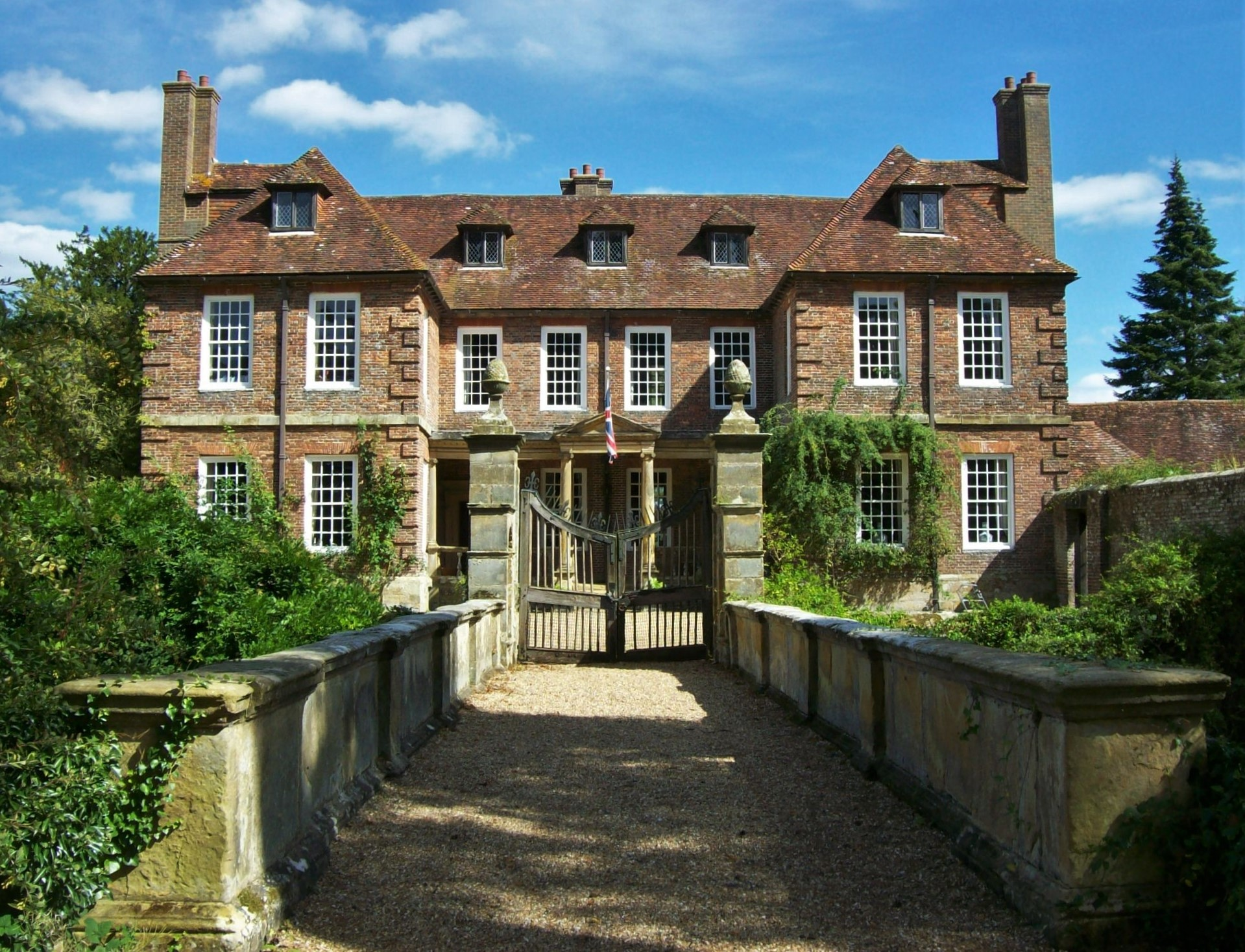
Groombridge Place seen from the front

Groombridge Place is a moated manor house in the village of Groombridge near Tunbridge Wells, Kent, England. It has become a tourist attraction, noted for its formal gardens and vineyards. The manor house has an associated dower house.

== History ==
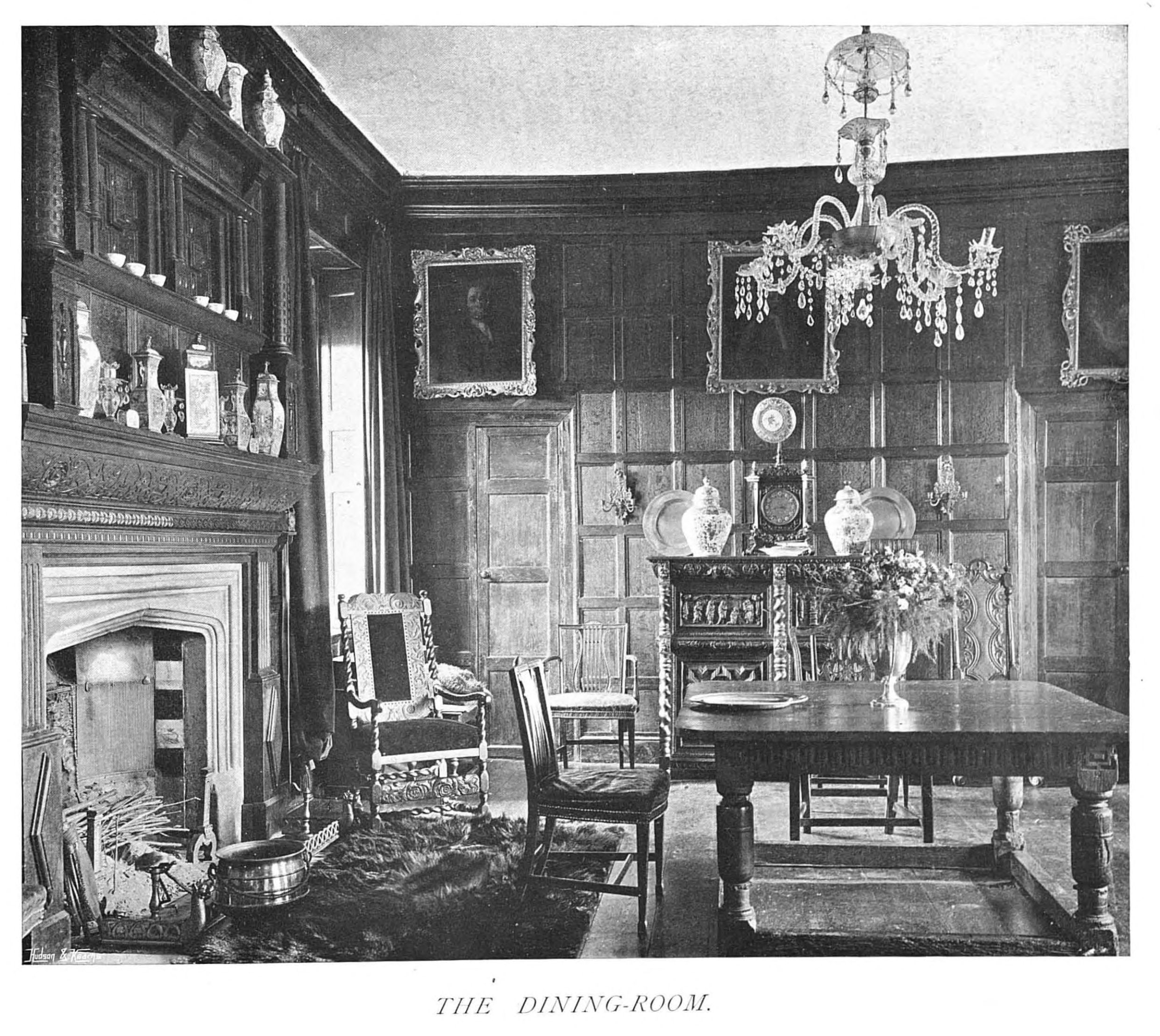
The Dining Room in 1904

There have been manor houses on the site of the present Groombridge for centuries. The earliest mention of one of these is from 1239, when the Lordship of Groomsbridge was granted to William Russell. William and his wife Haweis built a small moated castle at Groombridge, and, later that year, were granted a charter by Henry III of England to build a chantry. When William died in 1261, lordship was granted to Henry de Cobham, 1st Baron Cobham, heir of the influential Kentish family, the de Cobhams.

By the mid-14th century, the lands were held by Sir John de Clinton, whose grandson, Lord Clinton and Saye, sold Groombridge to Thomas Waller of Lamberhurst c.1400. Here, his descendant Sir Richard Waller detained Charles, Duke of Orléans, as his prisoner (following the Battle of Agincourt) for many years, until he was taken to the Tower of London. The Wallers held Groombridge Place for over two centuries until it was sold in the seventeenth century.

In 1604, the estate was purchased by Sir Thomas Sackville, 1st Earl of Dorset the Lord Treasurer of England. Sir Thomas also built a number of houses in the town of Groombridge. In 1618, Richard Sackville, 3rd Earl of Dorset had to sell Groombridge to John Packer due to gambling debts. Packer was deeply religious, and contributed mainly to the construction of nearby St John's Church.

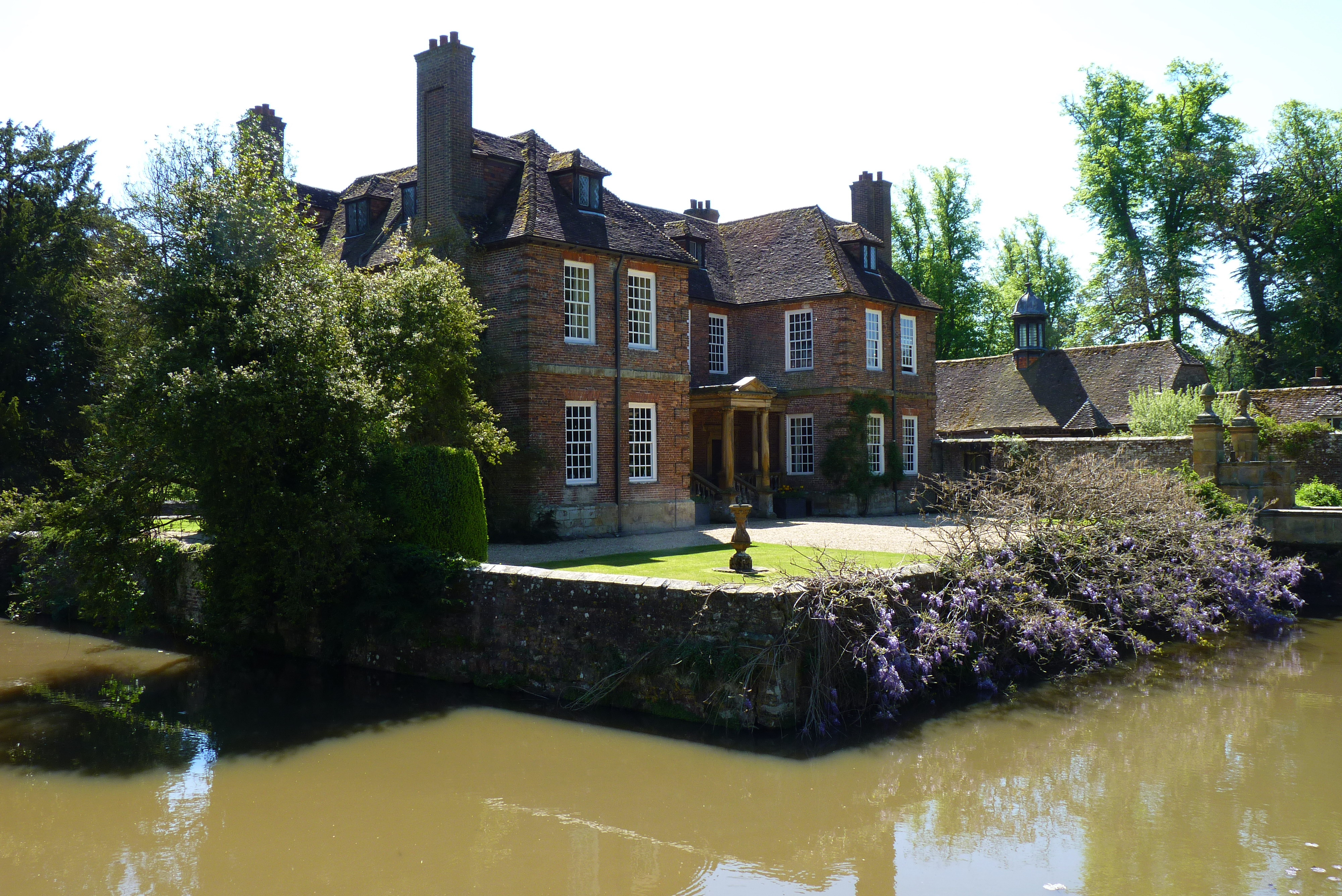
A view showing the moat

A generation later, the estate belonged to English barrister and architect Philip Packer, who, in 1662, built the present-day house with the help of his friend Christopher Wren. Philip Packer married heiress Isabella Berkeley, daughter of Robert Berkeley and Elizabeth Conyers, in 1652. The marriage failed to resolve Packer's financial problems. Isabella died at the age of 32. After Philip died in 1686, the estate was vested in the Chancery.

Groombridge Place lay empty for twenty years. During that time, the infamous Groombridge Gang began smuggling. Several times, dragoons were called to restore order in Groombridge. One persistent legend which dates back to that time is that of a tunnel between the cellars at Groombridge Place and those of the nearby Crown Inn, although no such tunnel has ever been found.

Though Groombridge Place has remained largely untouched since it was built over 350 years ago, the manor has undergone its share of restoration. In the 1920s, electricity and bathrooms were installed. In 1986, the roof timbers and the chimneys were rebuilt to their original design, as heavy growth of ivy had damaged them. The house itself is a private home and is not open to the public, although the gardens are.

In early 2023, entrepreneur Hôtel du Vin founder Robin Hutson acquired the property with a view to developing it into his tenth upmarket Pig hotel for a proposed 2025 reopening. In November 2024 it was disclosed that the reopening would be delayed until 2026 due to "the care needed to carry out renovations at the Grade I listed estate." In 2026, the Pig hotel chain decided that updating Groombridge Place to a hotel was not financially viable and sold Groombridge Place to a private buyer."

== Gardens ==
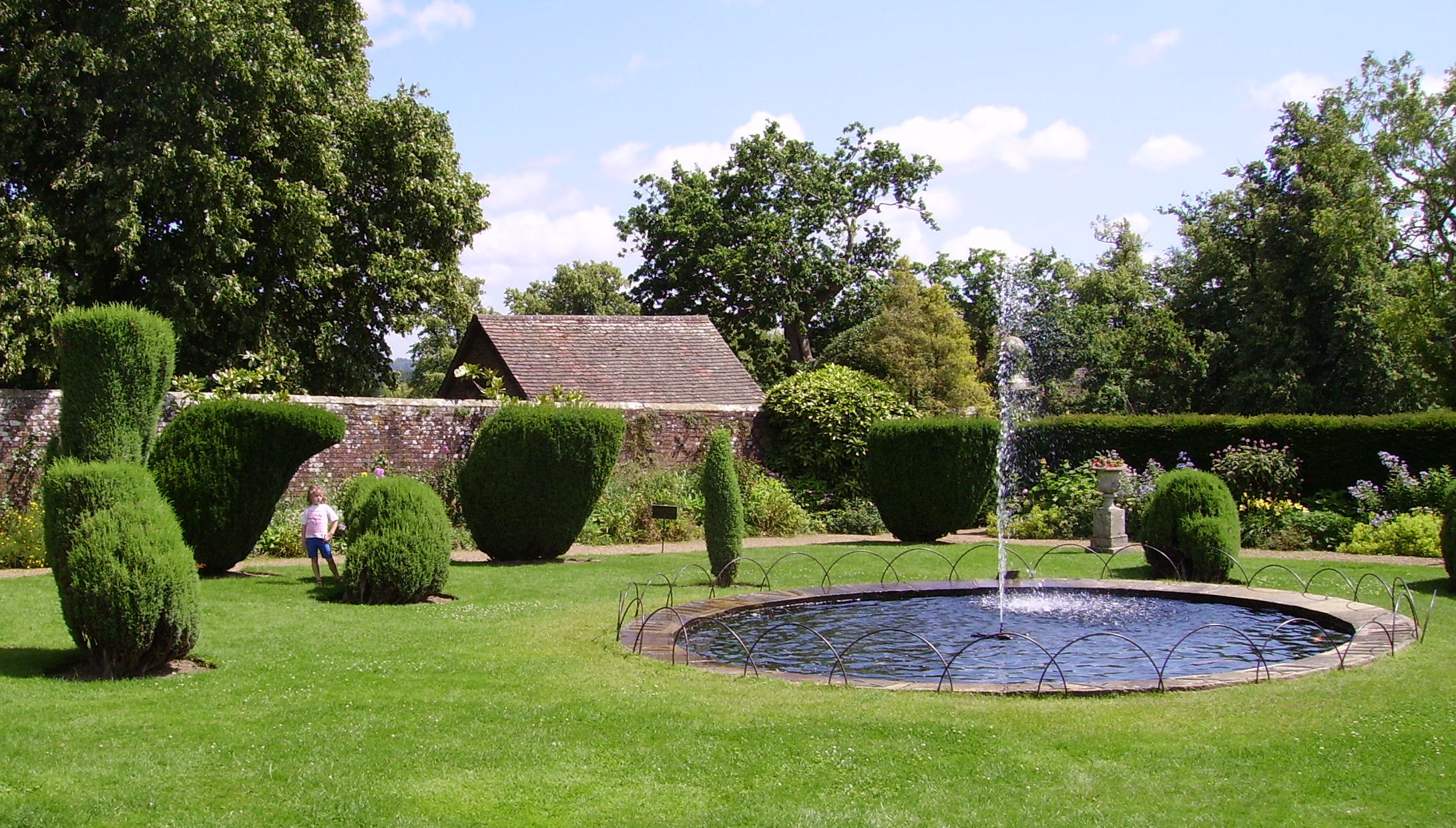
The Drunken Garden, the favourite garden of Sir Arthur Conan Doyle.

The help of diarist and horticulturist John Evelyn was enlisted by friend Phillip Packer for the planning of the new leisure gardens. It is said Evelyn planted two Scots pines by the front moat bridge, one of which still exists. On the steep hillsides within the forest are a series of contemporary gardens created in recent years. One famous garden is the Drunken Garden, a favourite of Sir Arthur Conan Doyle. His Sherlock Holmes novel The Valley of Fear is set at Groombridge Place, although the House is renamed "Birlstone Manor". A zeedonk, a small donkey, and a herd of fallow deer inhabit the grounds.

== The Secret Garden ==
The gate to the secret garden leads to a tiny hidden corner where a stream runs into the moat. It was here that Philip Packer died whilst reading a book.

Towards the end of the fifteenth century, the owner of Groombridge Place, Richard Waller, fell in love with Cicely Neville who was known for her beauty. She was the wife of Richard of York and mother of Richard III. Legend claims when she died in 1495 she was buried in Groombridge churchyard and Waller planted a hawthorn tree over her grave. In 1900, a branch was taken in an attempt to strike new growth but the attempt failed. A piece of Waller's love-tree still resides in the Secret Garden in a box on the wall. However, this theory is untrue: historical evidence does not support it, and Cicely Neville is buried in Fotheringhay, Northamptonshire; also there was no churchyard at Groombridge until the 1630s.

== Popular culture ==
The house has been used as a location for filming including: Pride and Prejudice (2005), The Draughtsman's Contract (1982) and the 2009 BBC production of The Day of the Triffids.

The Heir, a novel by Vita Sackville-West, was inspired by Groombridge Place and the house was reputedly the model for Birlstone Manor, the setting for the first part of Sir Arthur Conan Doyle's Valley of Fear.
