= Tunbridge Wells (constituency) =

UK Parliament constituency (since 1974)

Coordinates: 51°7′N 0°20′E

- County constituency for the House of Commons
- Boundaries since 2010
- Boundary of Tunbridge Wells in South East England
- County: Kent
- Electorate: 75,213 (2023)
- Major settlements: Tunbridge Wells; Paddock Wood

Current constituency
- Created: 1974
- Member of Parliament: Michael Martin (Liberal Democrats)
- Seats: One
- Created from: Tonbridge; Ashford

Tunbridge Wells is a constituency (Note: A county constituency (for the purposes of election expenses and type of returning officer)) in Kent represented in the House of Commons of the UK Parliament since 2024 by Michael Martin, a Liberal Democrat. (Note: As with all constituencies, the constituency elects one Member of Parliament (MP) by the first past the post system of election at least every five years.)

Prior to the 2024 election of a Liberal Democrat, the constituency had always returned Conservative Party members since its creation in 1974.

== Constituency profile ==
Royal Tunbridge Wells

Tunbridge Wells is a constituency in Kent in South East England. It is named after its largest town, Royal Tunbridge Wells, which has a population of around 53,000. Other settlements include the towns of Southborough and Paddock Wood and the villages of Rusthall, Pembury and Hawkhurst.

This is a mostly rural constituency within the High Weald, a national landscape of woodlands, farms and ridges. Royal Tunbridge Wells was founded in the 17th century as a fashionable spa retreat, and is today an affluent, suburban town. Southborough is an older settlement with an industrial history from the production of iron, gunpowder and bricks. Paddock Wood is a newer town that serves as a railway junction and developed around the growing of hops. The constituency is generally wealthy overall and house prices are higher than the regional and UK averages.

Residents of Tunbridge Wells are older than average with a low proportion of young adults. They have high rates of income, average levels of homeownership, and the child poverty rate is around half the UK-wide figure. Residents are well-educated and a high proportion work in the retail and finance sectors and in professional occupations. The percentage claiming unemployment benefits is low. White people made up 91% of the population at the 2021 census.

At the local council level, most of this constituency is represented by Liberal Democrats with some Labour Party councillors elected in Royal Tunbridge Wells and some Conservatives elected in the rural villages. An estimated 55% of voters across the Tunbridge Wells constituency supported remaining in the European Union in the 2016 referendum, higher than the UK-wide figure of 48%.

== Boundaries ==
1974–1983: The Borough of Royal Tunbridge Wells, the Urban District of Southborough, the Rural District of Cranbrook, in the Rural District of Tonbridge the parishes of Bidborough, Brenchley, Capel, Horsmonden, Lamberhurst, Paddock Wood, Pembury, Speldhurst.

1983–1997: The Borough of Tunbridge Wells. The constituency boundaries remained unchanged.

1997–2010: The Borough of Tunbridge Wells wards of Brenchley, Capel, Culverden, Goudhurst, Horsmonden, Lamberhurst, Paddock Wood, Pantiles, Park, Pembury, Rusthall, St James', St John's, St Mark's, Sherwood, Southborough East, Southborough North, Southborough West, Speldhurst and Bidborough.

2010–2024: The Borough of Tunbridge Wells wards of Brenchley and Horsmonden, Broadwater, Capel, Culverden, Goudhurst and Lamberhurst, Hawkhurst and Sandhurst, Paddock Wood East, Paddock Wood West, Pantiles and St Mark's, Park, Pembury, Rusthall, St James', St John's, Sherwood, Southborough and High Brooms, Southborough North, Speldhurst and Bidborough.

2024–present: The 2023 periodic review of Westminster constituencies, which was based on the ward structure in place on 1 December 2020, left the boundaries unchanged. However, following a local government boundary review which came into effect in May 2024, the constituency now comprises the following from the 2024 general election:

- The Borough of Tunbridge Wells wards of: Culverden; High Brooms; Paddock Wood; Pantiles; Park; Pembury & Capel; Rural Tunbridge Wells; Rusthall & Speldhurst; Sherwood; Southborough & Bidborough; St James'; St John's; and the Hawkhurst and Sandhurst parishes in the Hawkhurst, Sandhurst and Benenden ward.

The current constituency includes the large town of Royal Tunbridge Wells, as well as most of its borough to the east, which is generally rural.

== History ==
The constituency was created in 1974, and was originally named "Royal Tunbridge Wells". Except for Cranbrook Rural District (previously part of the Ashford constituency) the area had formed part of the constituency of Tonbridge prior to 1974. In 1983 the "Royal" prefix was removed from the seat's name.

Political history

The seat's results since its 1974 creation indicate a Conservative safe seat. In 1994, the Conservative group on the council lost control, but regained it in 1998.

Prominent frontbenchers

In succession, from 1983 until 1997 Patrick Mayhew reached three leading positions: Solicitor General for England and Wales, Attorney General for England and Wales and for Northern Ireland (simultaneously) and Secretary of State for Northern Ireland.

From 2000 to 2001, Archie Norman was the Shadow Secretary of State for Environment, Transport and the Regions.

The previous MP Greg Clark, was Minister for Decentralisation from the start of the Cameron ministry, and then two years later became Financial Secretary to the Treasury. He then served as the Minister of State for Cities and Constitution, Minister of State for Universities, Science and Cities before serving in the cabinet as the Secretary of State for Communities and Local Government after the 2015 General Election

In the May ministry, he served throughout as the Secretary of State for Business, Energy and Industrial Strategy before stepping down after May's resignation in July 2019. After returning to the backbenches, he served as the chair of the Science, Innovation and Technology Select Committee across the Johnson, Truss and Sunak ministries.

Clark stepped down for the 2024 general election, when the seat was won by Mike Martin of the Liberal Democrats – the first time it, and its predecessor Tonbridge, have not been represented by a Conservative since the latter's creation in 1918.

== Members of Parliament ==
Tonbridge and Ashford prior to 1974

Election	Member	Party
February 1974	Patrick Mayhew	Conservative
1997	Archie Norman	Conservative
2005	Greg Clark	Conservative
September 2019	Greg Clark	Independent
November 2019	Greg Clark	Conservative
2024	Mike Martin	Liberal Democrats

== Elections ==
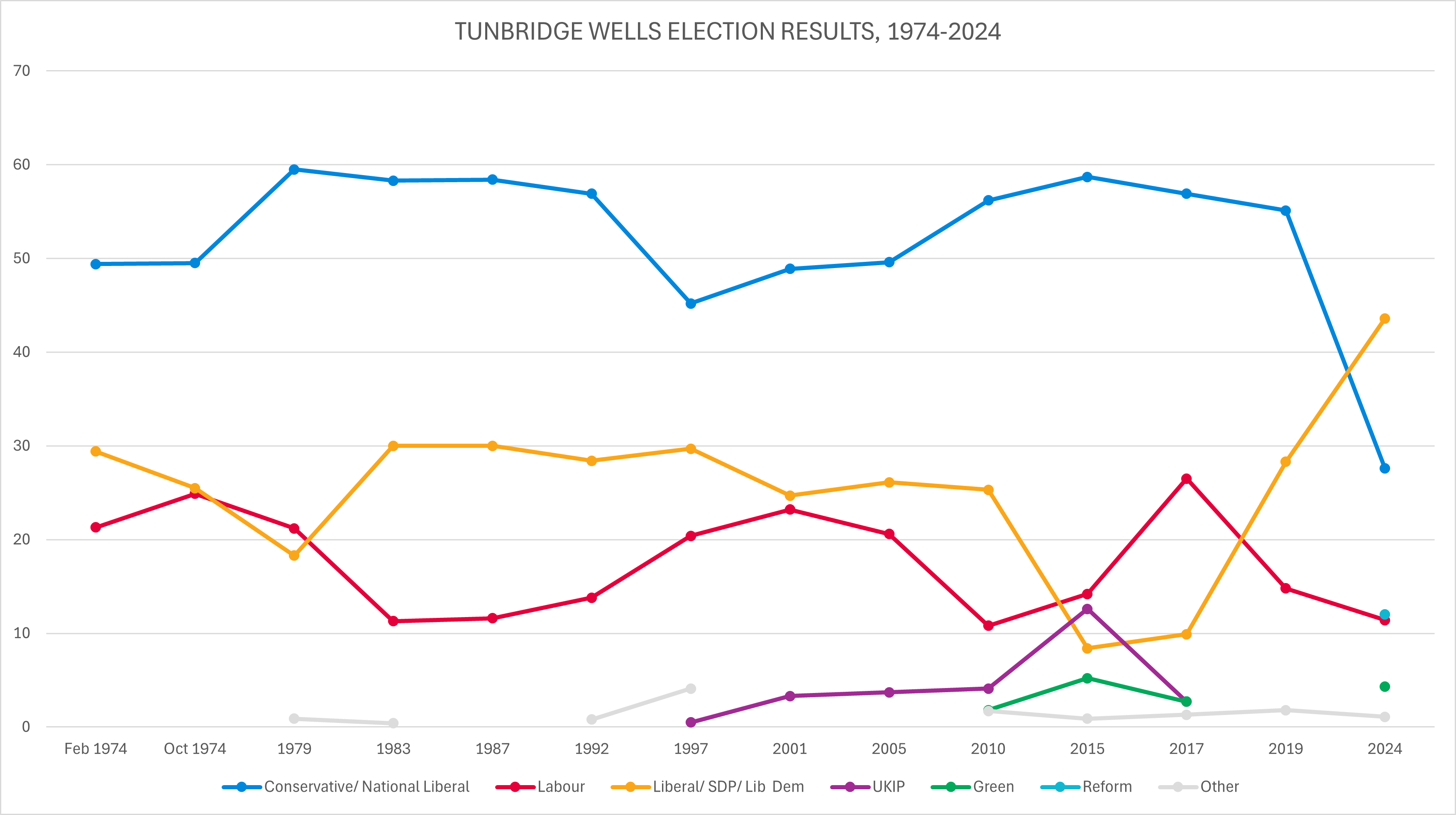
Election results 1974-2024

=== Elections in the 2020s ===
General election 2024: Tunbridge Wells
Party	Candidate	Votes	%	±%
Liberal Democrats	Mike Martin	23,661	43.6	+15.3
Conservative	Neil Mahapatra	14,974	27.6	−27.5
Reform	John Gager	6,484	12.0	N/A
Labour	Hugo Pound	6,178	11.4	−3.4
Green	John Hurst	2,344	4.3	+4.3
Independent	Hassan Kassem	609	1.1	N/A
Majority		8,687	16.0	
Turnout		54,250	69.2	−3.8
Registered electors		78,738		
Liberal Democrats gain from Conservative		Swing	+21.4	

=== Elections in the 2010s ===
General election 2019: Tunbridge Wells
Party	Candidate	Votes	%	±%
Conservative	Greg Clark	30,119	55.1	–1.8
Liberal Democrats	Ben Chapelard	15,474	28.3	+18.4
Labour	Antonio Weiss	8,098	14.8	−11.7
Independent	Christopher Camp	488	0.9	N/A
Independent	Nigel Peacock	471	0.9	N/A
Majority		14,645	26.8	−3.6
Turnout		54,650	73.0	+0.9
Conservative hold		Swing	−10.1	

General election 2017: Tunbridge Wells
Party	Candidate	Votes	%	±%
Conservative	Greg Clark	30,856	56.9	−1.8
Labour	Charles Woodgate	14,391	26.5	+12.3
Liberal Democrats	Rachel Sadler	5,355	9.9	+1.5
UKIP	Chris Hoare	1,464	2.7	−9.9
Green	Trevor Bisdee	1,441	2.7	−2.5
Women's Equality	Celine Thomas	702	1.3	N/A
Majority		16,465	30.4	−14.1
Turnout		54,209	72.1	+2.1
Conservative hold		Swing	−5.25	

General election 2015: Tunbridge Wells
Party	Candidate	Votes	%	±%
Conservative	Greg Clark	30,181	58.7	+2.5
Labour	Kevin Kerrigan	7,307	14.2	+3.4
UKIP	Colin Nicholson	6,481	12.6	+8.5
Liberal Democrats	James MacCleary	4,342	8.4	−16.9
Green	Marie Jones	2,659	5.2	+3.4
Independent	Graham Naismith	458	0.9	N/A
Majority		22,874	44.5	+13.6
Turnout		51,428	70.0	+0.2
Conservative hold		Swing	−0.5	

General election 2010: Tunbridge Wells
Party	Candidate	Votes	%	±%
Conservative	Greg Clark	28,302	56.2	+5.5
Liberal Democrats	David Hallas	12,726	25.3	0.0
Labour	Gary Heather	5,448	10.8	−9.6
UKIP	Victor Webb	2,054	4.1	+0.6
Green	Hazel Dawe	914	1.8	N/A
BNP	Andrew McBride	704	1.4	N/A
Independent	Farel Bradbury	172	0.3	N/A
Majority		15,576	30.9	+7.4
Turnout		50,320	69.8	+3.9
Conservative hold		Swing	+2.8	

=== Elections in the 2000s ===
General election 2005: Tunbridge Wells
Party	Candidate	Votes	%	±%
Conservative	Greg Clark	21,083	49.6	+0.7
Liberal Democrats	Laura Murphy	11,095	26.1	+1.4
Labour	Jacqui Jedrzejewski	8,736	20.6	−2.6
UKIP	Victor Webb	1,568	3.7	+0.4
Majority		9,988	23.5	−0.7
Turnout		42,482	65.7	+3.4
Conservative hold		Swing	−0.4	

General election 2001: Tunbridge Wells
Party	Candidate	Votes	%	±%
Conservative	Archie Norman	19,643	48.9	+3.7
Liberal Democrats	Keith Brown	9,913	24.7	−5.0
Labour	Ian Carvell	9,332	23.2	+2.8
UKIP	Victor Webb	1,313	3.3	+2.8
Majority		9,730	24.2	+6.7
Turnout		40,201	62.3	−11.8
Conservative hold		Swing	+4.4	

=== Elections in the 1990s ===
General election 1997: Tunbridge Wells
Party	Candidate	Votes	%	±%
Conservative	Archie Norman	21,853	45.2	−11.7
Liberal Democrats	Anthony S. Clayton	14,347	29.7	+1.3
Labour	Peter Warner	9,879	20.4	+6.6
Referendum	Tim Macpherson	1,858	3.8	N/A
UKIP	M. Smart	264	0.5	N/A
Natural Law	Paul Levy	153	0.3	−0.1
Majority		7,506	15.5	−13.0
Turnout		48,354	74.1	−4.0
Conservative hold		Swing	−6.5	

General election 1992: Tunbridge Wells
Party	Candidate	Votes	%	±%
Conservative	Patrick Mayhew	34,162	56.9	−1.5
Liberal Democrats	Anthony S. Clayton	17,030	28.4	−1.6
Labour	EAC Goodman	8,300	13.8	+2.2
Natural Law	EW Fenna	267	0.4	N/A
Independent	R Edey	236	0.4	N/A
Majority		17,132	28.5	+0.1
Turnout		59,995	78.1	+3.8
Conservative hold		Swing	0.0	

=== Elections in the 1980s ===
General election 1987: Tunbridge Wells
Party	Candidate	Votes	%	±%
Conservative	Patrick Mayhew	33,111	58.4	+0.1
Liberal	Dorothy Buckrell	16,989	30.0	0.0
Labour	Peter Sloman	6,555	11.6	+0.3
Majority		16,122	28.4	+0.1
Turnout		56,655	74.3	+1.6
Conservative hold		Swing	+0.1	

General election 1983: Tunbridge Wells
Party	Candidate	Votes	%	±%
Conservative	Patrick Mayhew	31,199	58.3	−1.2
Liberal	Peter Blaine	16,073	30.0	+11.7
Labour	Stephen Casely	6,042	11.3	−9.9
National Front	D Smith	236	0.4	−0.5
Majority		15,126	28.3	−10.0
Turnout		53,550	72.7	−2.00
Conservative hold		Swing	−6.5	

=== Elections in the 1970s ===
General election 1979: Royal Tunbridge Wells
Party	Candidate	Votes	%	±%
Conservative	Patrick Mayhew	31,928	59.5	+10.0
Labour	AAJ Bartlett	11,392	21.2	−3.7
Liberal	R Baker	9,797	18.3	−7.3
National Front	W Standen	509	0.9	N/A
Majority		20,536	38.3	+14.3
Turnout		53,626	74.7	+2.2
Conservative hold		Swing	+6.9	

General election October 1974: Royal Tunbridge Wells
Party	Candidate	Votes	%	±%
Conservative	Patrick Mayhew	24,829	49.5	+0.1
Liberal	DC Owens	12,802	25.5	−3.9
Labour	RC Blackwell	12,499	24.9	+3.6
Majority		12,027	24.0	+4.0
Turnout		50,130	72.5	−7.9
Conservative hold		Swing	+2.0	

General election February 1974: Royal Tunbridge Wells
Party	Candidate	Votes	%	±%
Conservative	Patrick Mayhew	27,212	49.4	
Liberal	DC Owens	16,184	29.4	
Labour	MF Short	11,734	21.3	
Majority		11,028	20.0	
Turnout		55,130	80.4	
Conservative win (new seat)				

== See also ==
- List of parliamentary constituencies in Kent
- List of parliamentary constituencies in the South East England (region)
