= Canterbury Treasure =

Roman hoard

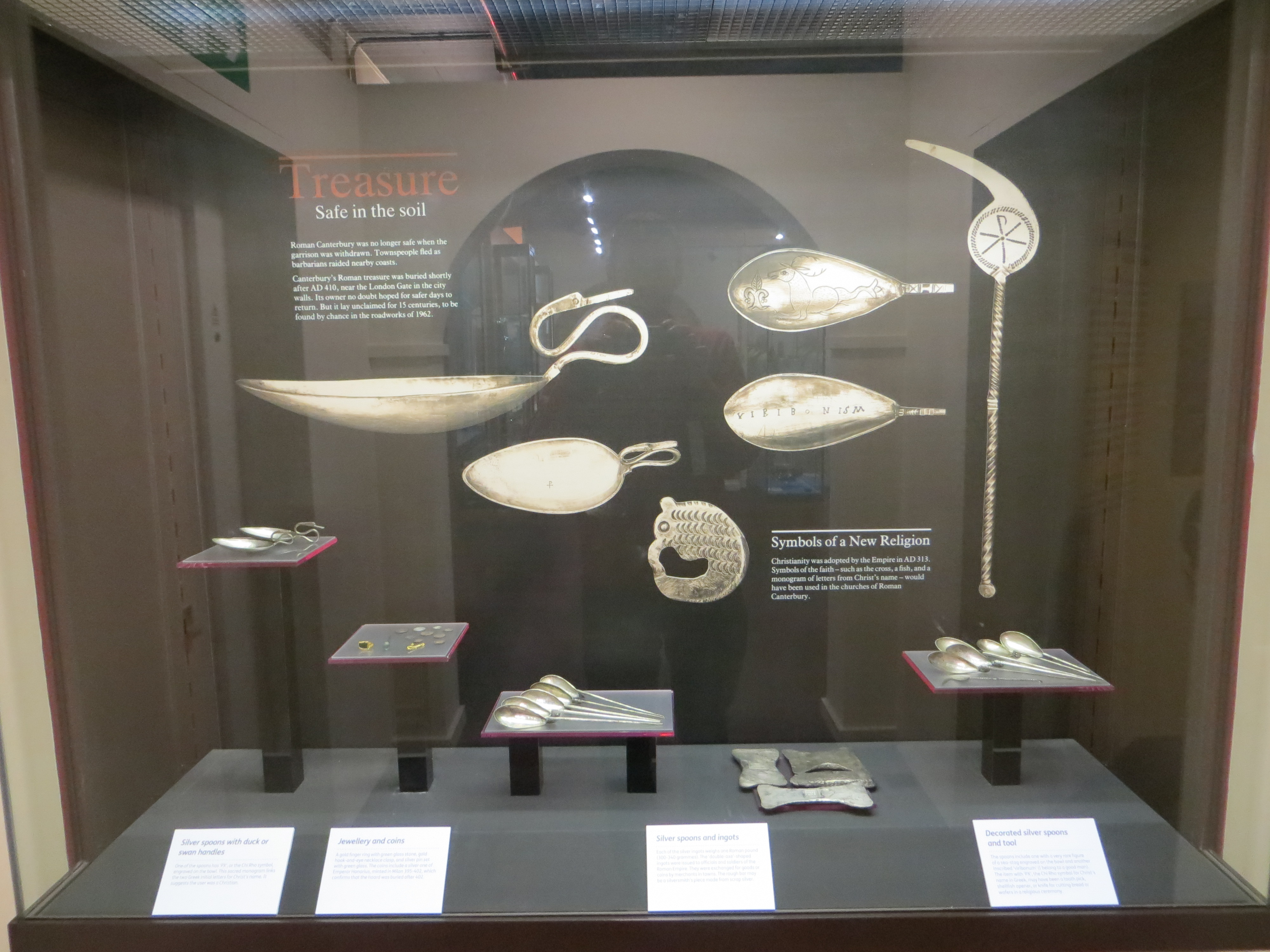
- The Canterbury Treasure, as displayed in the Canterbury Roman Museum
- Material: Silver
- Writing: Latin
- Created: Late 4th or early 5th Century AD
- Discovered: 1962
- Present location: Roman Museum, Canterbury

The Canterbury Treasure is an important late Roman silver hoard found in the city of Canterbury, Kent, south-east England, ancient Durovernum Cantiacorum, in 1962, and now in the Canterbury Roman Museum in Canterbury, Kent. Copies of the main items are also kept in the British Museum.

== Discovery ==
The hoard was discovered during road works just outside the city walls in 1962, close to the site of the Roman London Gate. Declared treasure trove, it was bought by the city council to be displayed at the Roman Museum which had been established the year before. However, five objects appeared on the London antiquities market in 1982 that were originally part of the treasure but had not been declared at the time of its discovery. They were again declared as treasure trove and purchased a year later. The Canterbury Treasure was probably buried in the early 5th century AD, when the Romans were withdrawing their garrisons from Britain. The owner of the treasure, who may have been a silversmith, buried it for safe-keeping, only to never reclaim it.

== Description ==
The treasure is mostly composed of small silver objects and jewellery. Many of the artefacts have Christian iconography on them. The silver objects include two spoons with swan-shaped handles, ten spoons (one engraved with a sea stag, another with the words in Latin 'viribonum'-'I belong to a good man'), a toothpick, a rough bar and three ingots which each weigh one Roman pound. The jewellery include a gold finger ring with an inset green glass stone, a gold necklace clasp and a silver pin. One of the coins in the treasure was minted at Milan in the time of Emperor Honorius, which means the hoard must have been buried sometime after 402 AD.

== See also ==
- Hoxne Hoard
- Mildenhall Treasure
- Water Newton Treasure

== Gallery ==
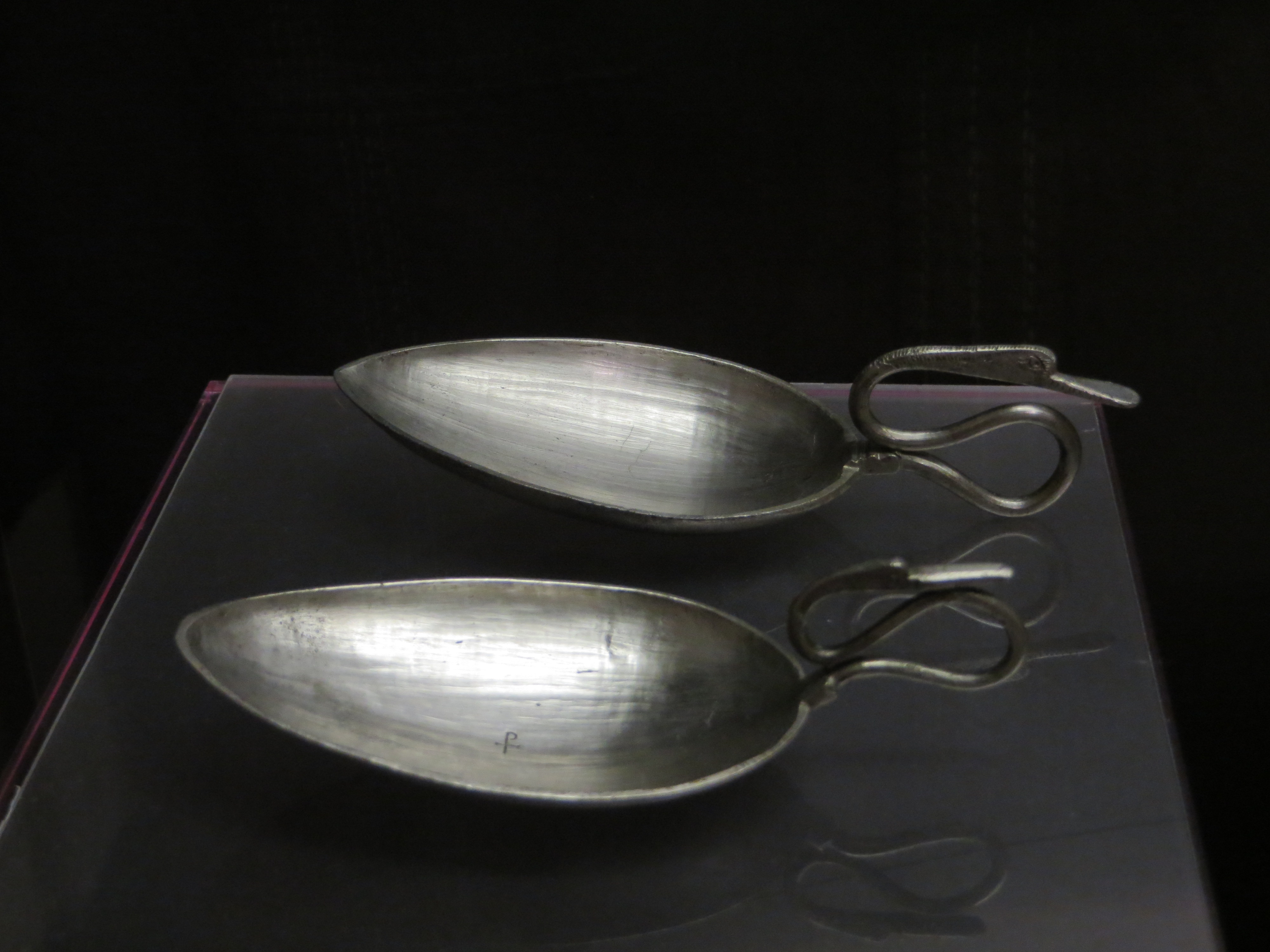
Two large silver spoons with swan shaped handles

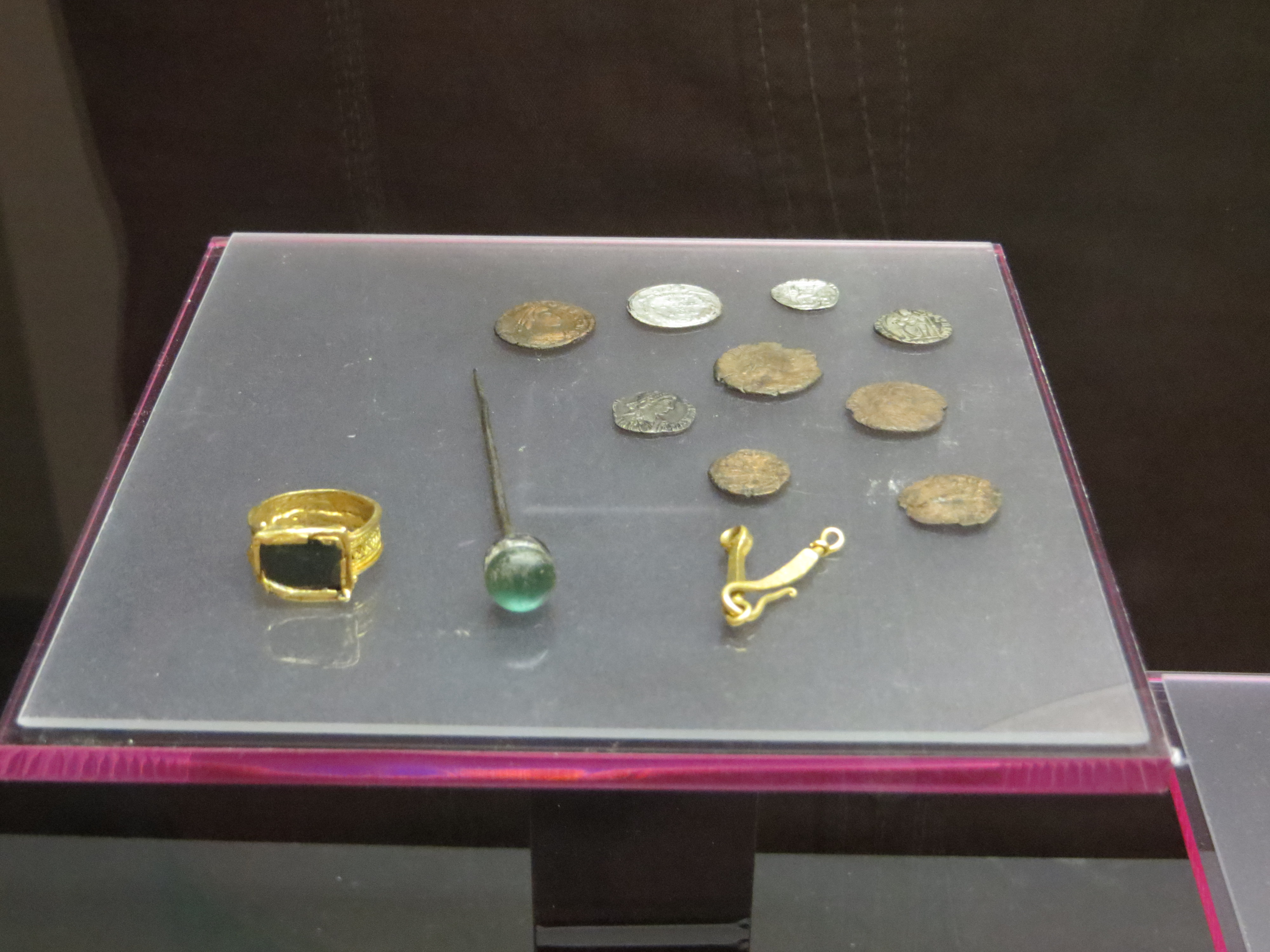
Gold jewellery and coins from the hoard

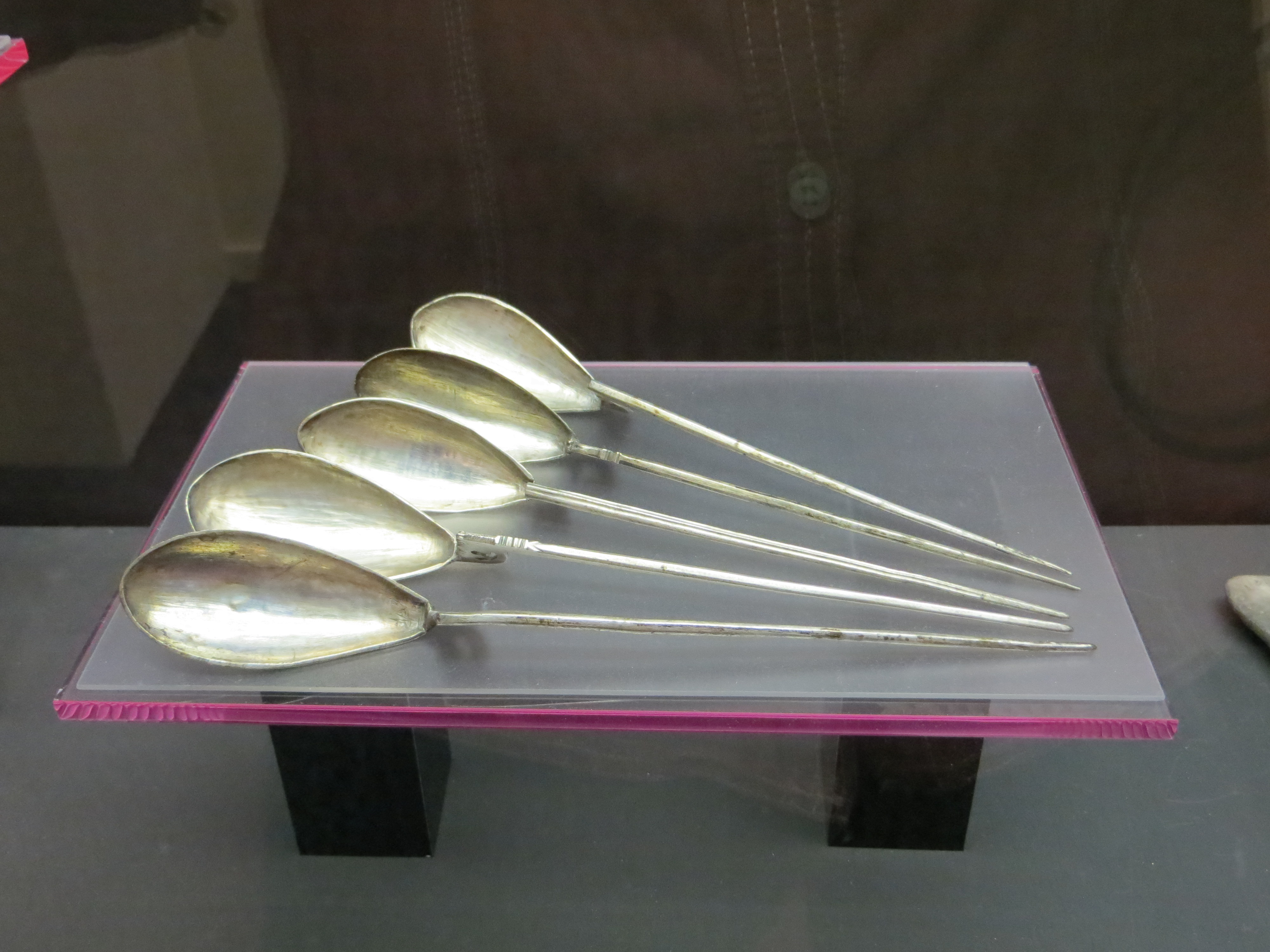
Five plain spoons that are typically Roman in design

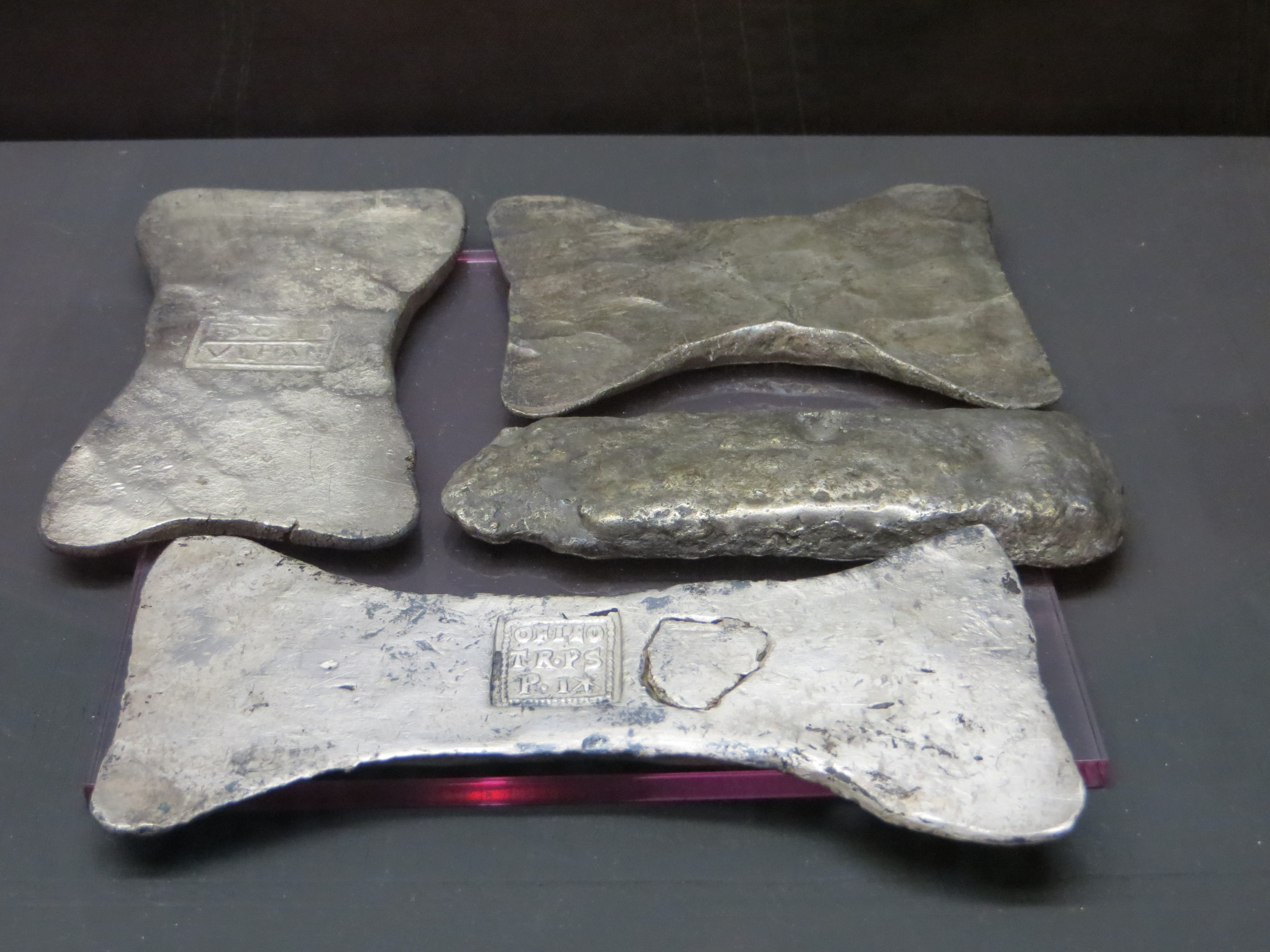
Three silver ingots and a rough piece of silver

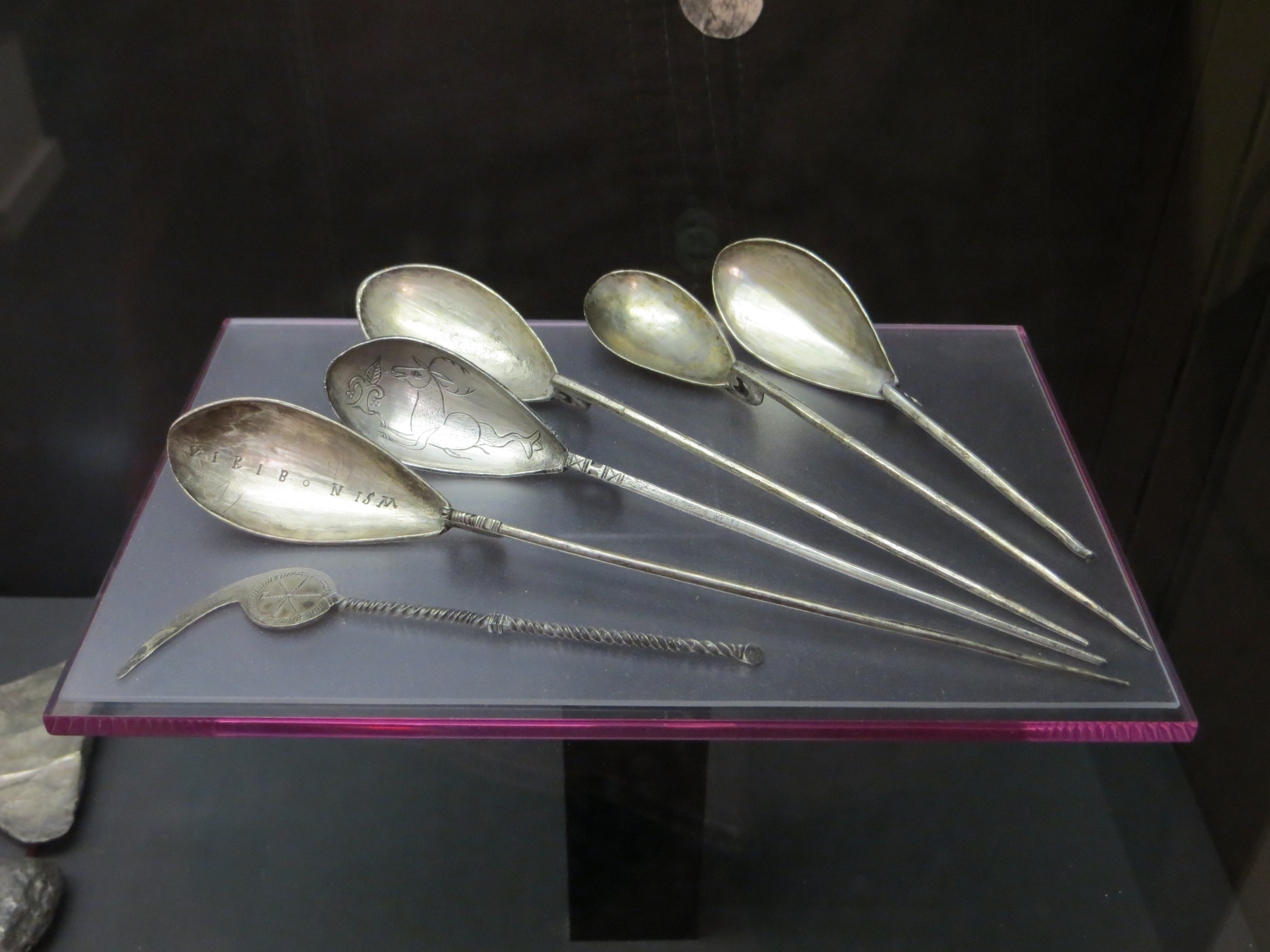
Another five spoons (two of which are engraved) and a toothpick

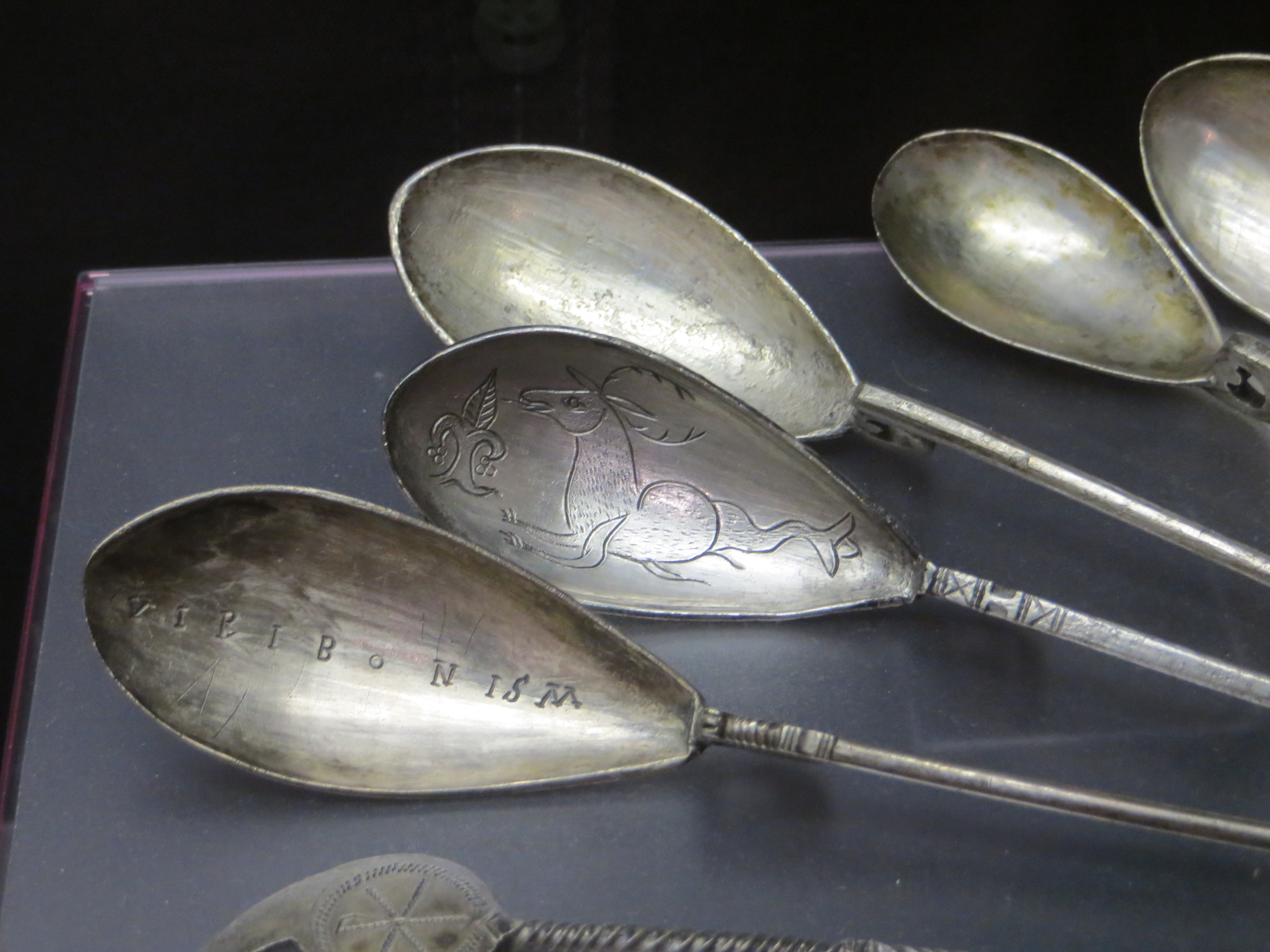
Detail of the decorated spoons

== Bibliography ==
- Kenneth S. Painter: A Roman silver treasure from Canterbury. In: Journal of the British Archaeological Association 3. Serie 28, 1965, p. 1–15.
- David E. Strong: Greek and Roman Silver Plate. British Museum Press, London 1966, p. 205.
- Catherine M. Johns, Timothy W. Potter: The Canterbury Late Roman Treasure. In: Antiquaries Journal 75, 1985, p. 314–352.
