= Westgate Hall, Canterbury =

Community hall and dance hall

Westgate Hall

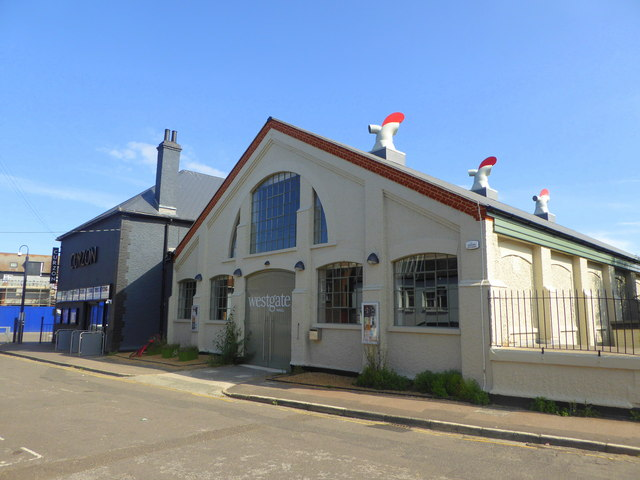
- Westgate Hall after renovation, 2016

- Location within Kent

General information
- Type: Former drill hall Community centre Entertainment venue
- Architectural style: Drill hall
- Location: Canterbury, Kent, England
- Coordinates: 51°16′54″N 1°04′39″E
- Completed: 1900
- Renovated: 2014
- Owner: Westgate Hall Community Trust Ltd

Website
- westgatehall.org

Westgate Hall is a hundred-year-old drill hall and community space in a Conservation area of Canterbury, Kent, notable for hosting community events. The Hall was threatened with closure or demolition in 2009, but a group of local people fought to save it. The building is now leased by Curzon Cinemas. Westgate Hall now hosts a range of events from parties to conferences, markets and fairs including the Westgate Hall Market.

== History ==
=== Building ===
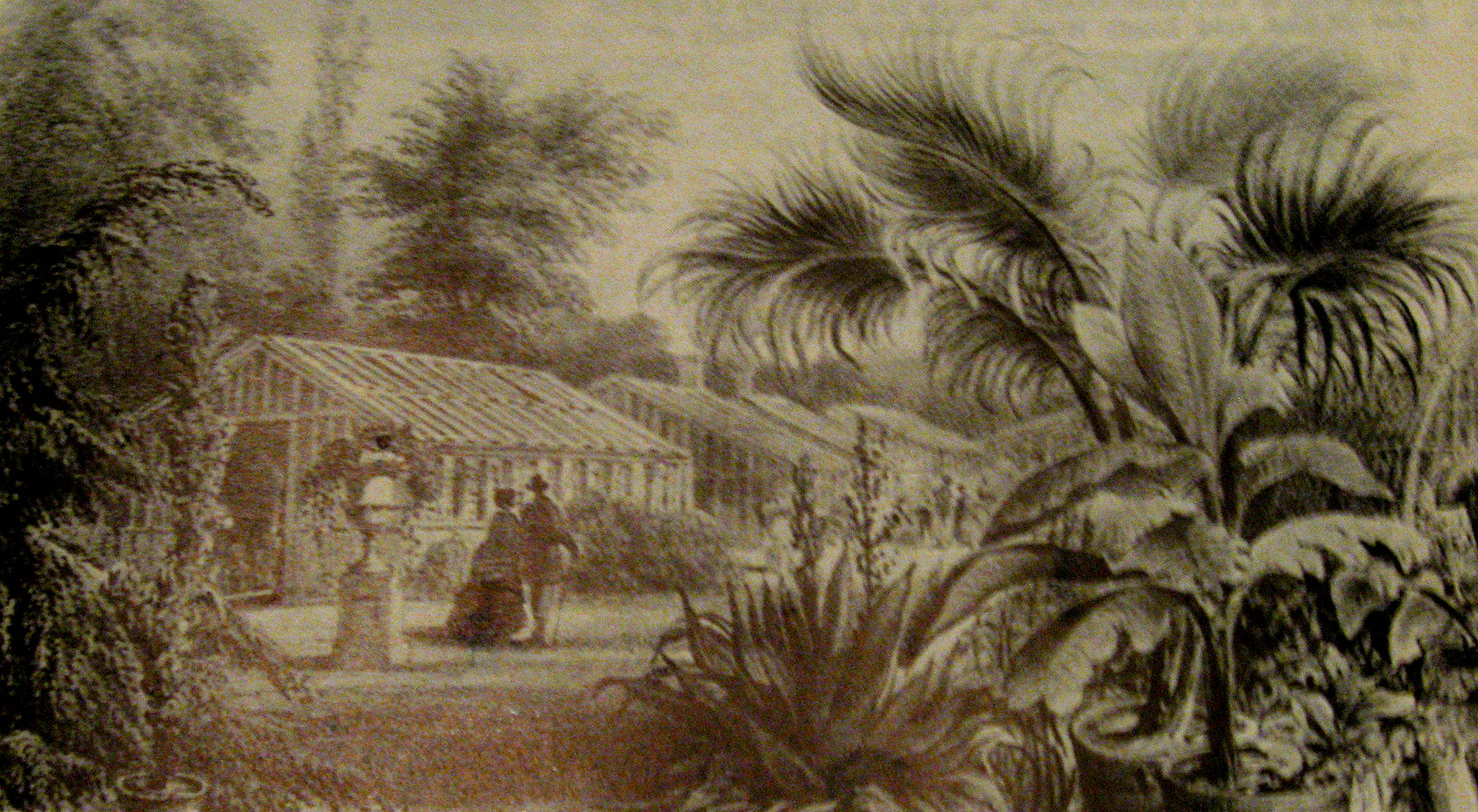
Masters' Exotic Nursery was on the site until 1896

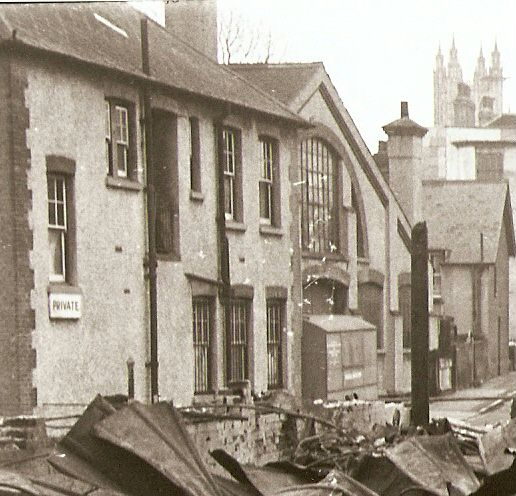
Westgate Hall 1944, having survived bombing

In 1874 on the site of the present hall there was Welby Square and a large, laid-out garden stretching back to St Peter's Lane where the gardener's cottage remains today. It was called Masters' Exotic Nursery: an exotic garden with two springs giving chalybeate and mineral water and a very tall Lombardy poplar 16 ft (4.9 m) in girth at base. It can be seen on the 1874 map below. The nursery, which stretched northward from Welby Square, belonged to the Masters family and occupied 30 acres (120,000 m^{2}) of land. The gardens were dismantled and sold in 1896, and the last owner of the nursery was George Mount. The square was replaced by Westgate Lane; West Gate Hall and a car park are now on the site of the garden.

1899 maps do not yet show the hall in Welby Square, but a panorama photo taken in 1900 does show it, so the hall was probably built between 1899 and 1900. It is not known for what purpose it was built, but St Peter's Mission Hall is mentioned as being in Welby square in the early days of the hall. It was used as a drill hall for the Territorials during World War I, and survived the 1944 bombing of Canterbury in World War II. It appears in a cityscape photograph taken in 1900. The hall was originally built expensively with a fancy tiled roof and large windows at each end, with a stained-glass panel in the top window at the Westgate Hall Lane end. The Victorian building next door was later knocked through between the wars and the foyer given Art Deco fittings. This building is now in a Conservation area, and a project exists to record all drill halls before they are lost to redevelopment.

Part of the hall frontage in 1955, showing original windows

== Usage of hall ==
=== Military use ===
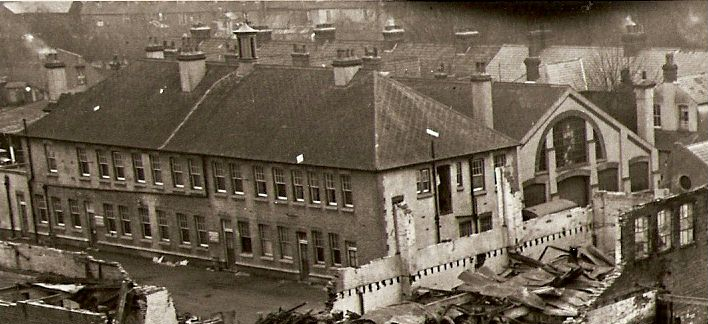
Westgate Hall 1944, showing original frontage with hint of stained glass in top arched window

The hall was probably the local Rifle Volunteers' meeting place before its winding-up and amalgamation into the Territorial Force in 1908. The hall was the base for B and C Companies, 4th Battalion, the Buffs from its inception as a Territorial battalion in 1908, and they were still there in 1913. It was also the headquarters of the Royal East Kent (The Duke of Connaught's Own) Yeomanry in 1908.

An old photo shows army recruits marching outside the hall in 1915, when it was described as a drill hall. In 1920 the drill hall became the headquarters for the 4th Battalion of the Buffs and by 1921 the Royal East Kent Yeomanry had evolved to become 385 (Duke of Connaught's Own Yeomanry) Battery, Royal Artillery. Residents would see battalions marching through the building from one end to the other. The hall was used as a hospital during the Second World War. A photograph exists of General Bernard Montgomery visiting the hall in 1943, after which the Buffs moved to Leros. It was still referred to as the drill hall between the Second World War and the 1970s. The hall was taken over by the Council in the early 1970s.

=== Community use ===
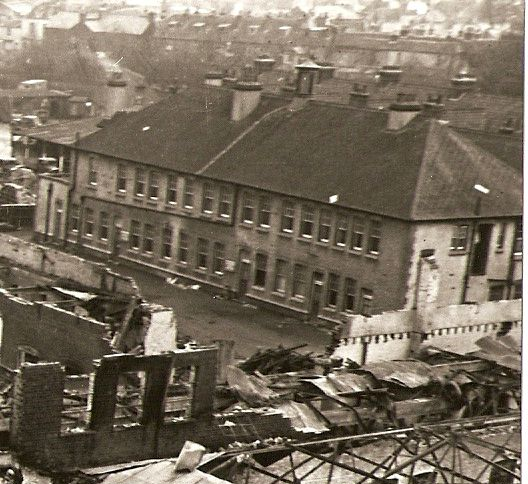
Westgate Hall 1944, showing original Victorian design of what is now foyer and offices section of hall

It may have been called St Peter's Mission Hall as early as 1903, as there was a hall of that name in Welby Square, but no drill hall is mentioned in trade directories. It was one of the conference halls used by the Mothers’ Union in 1927. Probably during its early years until 1914, and since the early 1970s, it has been a community centre. Along with the Beehive, the hall was the background to the beginning of the current Canterbury music scene. The first regular music group to play here was the Wilde Flowers.

It is now a dance hall with sprung floor used by the people of Canterbury and by students from the University of Kent and Canterbury Christ Church University. It has a bar open eleven hours a week, is used for events and fairs, for ballroom dancing and as a conference venue, and accommodates hundreds of people. Local clubs and societies use the hall. The University of Kent uses the hall for the collection of robes on graduation days. This is also a venue for serious events such as Holocaust Memorial Day. The Council itself uses the Westgate Hall to count votes, and sports events such as 2007 Tour de France finish stages at the hall. Blood donor sessions are held here, besides Weight Watchers, gigs and wedding receptions. National Childbirth Trust hold their nearly-new sales in the hall twice a year.

== Reminiscences of the hall ==
"Canterbury was lucky then in that it had a number of halls suitable for public dances . . . I used to go to several dances: in the Drill Hall in St. Peter’s Lane, and the Oddfellows Hall in Orange Street; the Forresters' Hall in High Street. Entrance fee was about a shilling, I think. The Drill Hall used to be non-stop. We had a band at each end and it was from 8 to 1 am in the morning. One and sixpence. Strict tempo, waltz, valeta, quick-step. If you went on the floor and you weren’t complying with the music the M.C. would ask you to leave the floor. There was a place for refreshments and a bar upstairs. You could take a girl to a dance, buy refreshments, buy a packet of cigarettes and a tube of Parma Violet Cashews and have change the next morning out of ten shillings." Howard, born 1903.

== Threat of closure ==
The hall was under threat of closure or demolition as of 2009, pending a decision by Canterbury City Council on that day. This caused widespread controversy and a pressure group was formed to ensure survival of the hall. In the event the Council voted in favour of this proposal, however the Westgate Community Trust worked with the local community to save the hall. The Westgate Community Trust reported that the Council confirmed that the hall would remain open until June 2011. In July 2011, the Council prepared to discuss plans by the Westgate Community Trust and the Corinthian Curzon cinema company to lease the hall for the benefit of the community. In the event, on 27 July, the Council approved use by Curzon Cinema and voted to grant a 100-year lease to the Trust, subject to conditions.

== Reopening ==
In February 2014, City of Canterbury council, Curzon Cinemas and the Westgate Community Trust signed a 99-year lease transferring the Hall to the Trust, and the building was scheduled to re-open in November 2014. The Department for Communities and Local Government community assets fund awarded a grant of £344,497 to the Trust. As of January 2014 the building was closed for renovation as a cinema with a hall for community use. The hall is now open for local events, including parties, conferences, markets and fairs including the Westgate Hall Market.

== Gallery ==
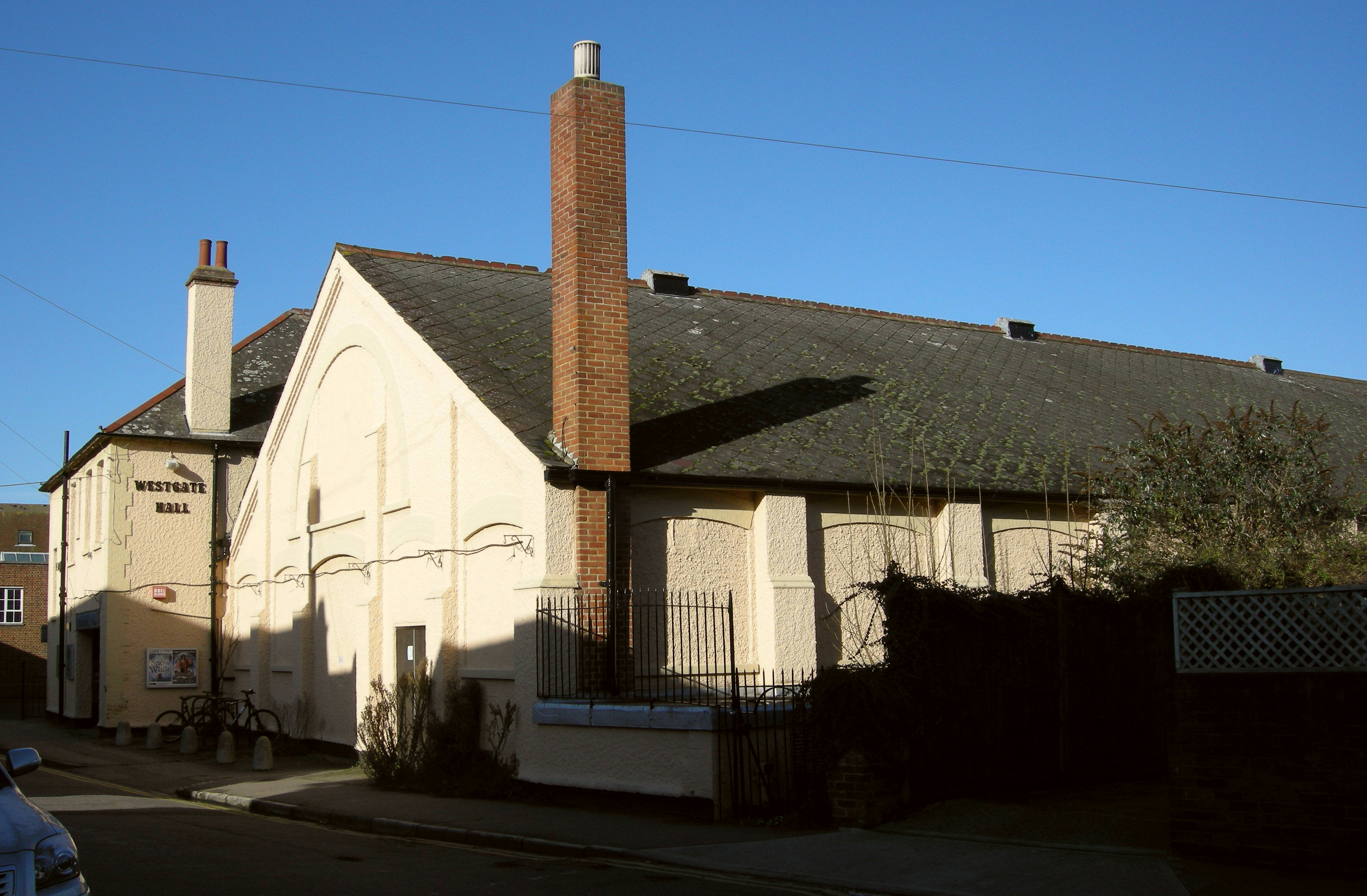
Westgate Hall, 2010

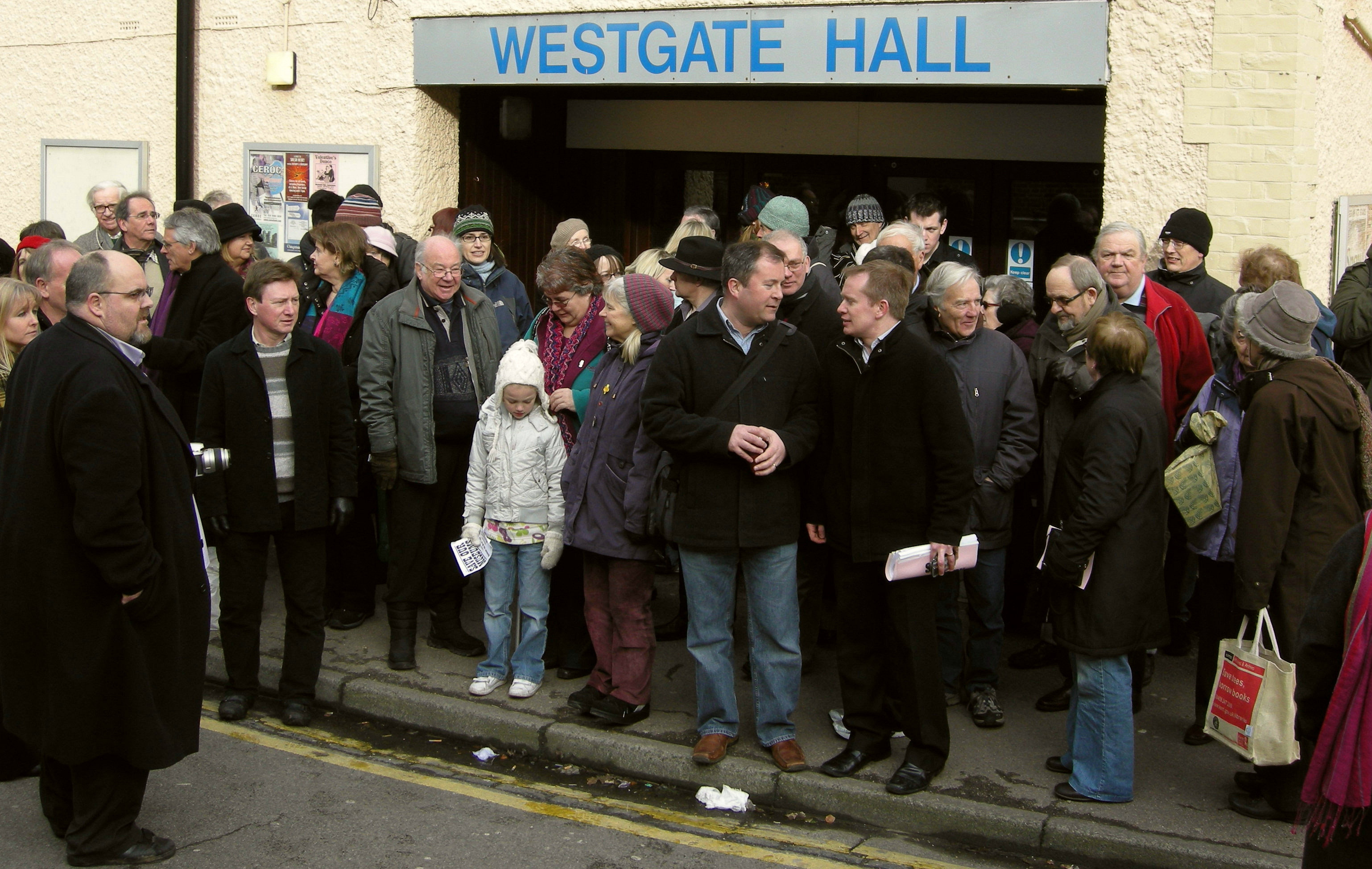
Users of Westgate Hall gather to object to the Council closure of the hall, 2010. Cllr Alex Perkins (left); Cllr James Flanagan (centre, holding papers)

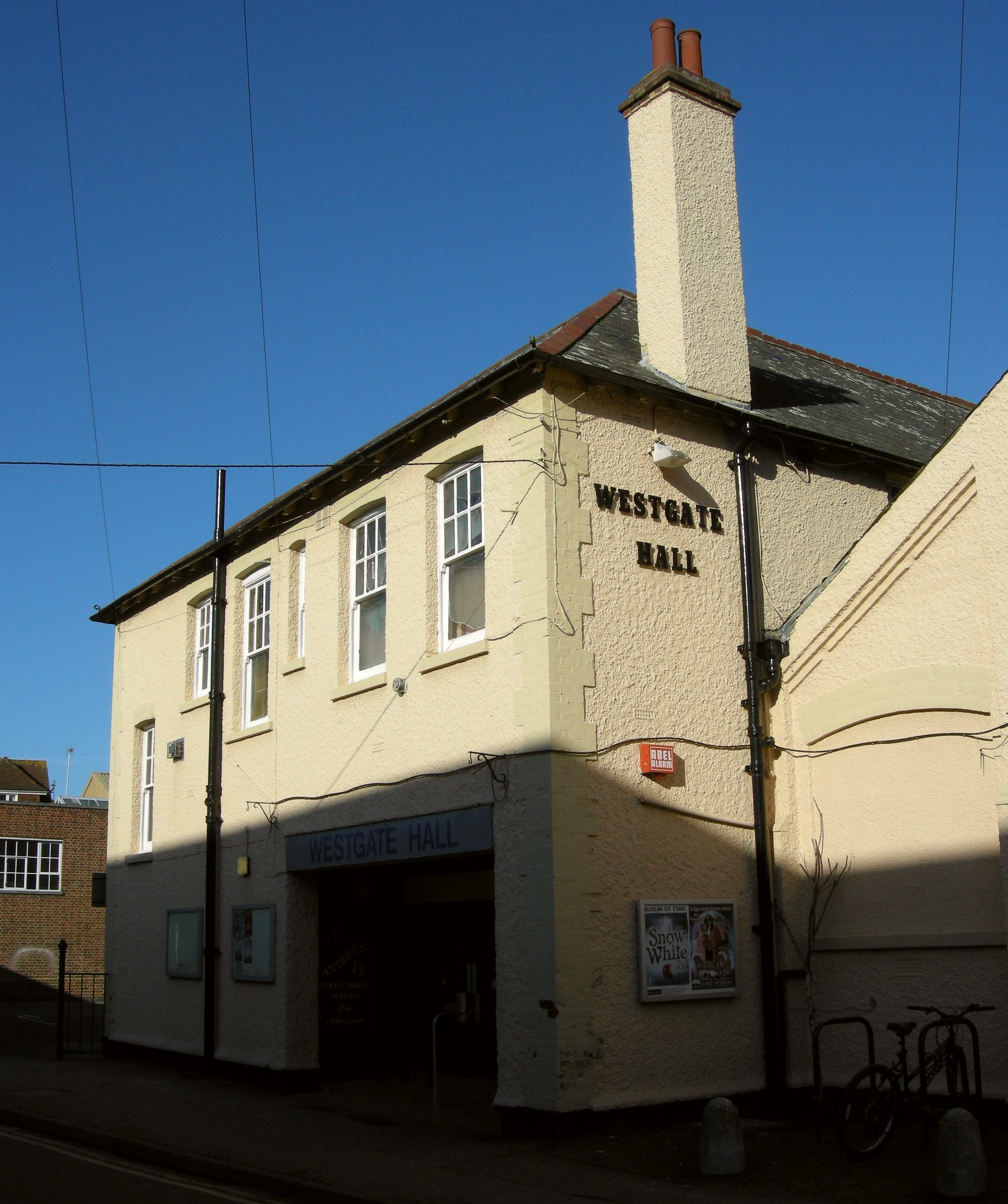
Westgate Hall front entrance

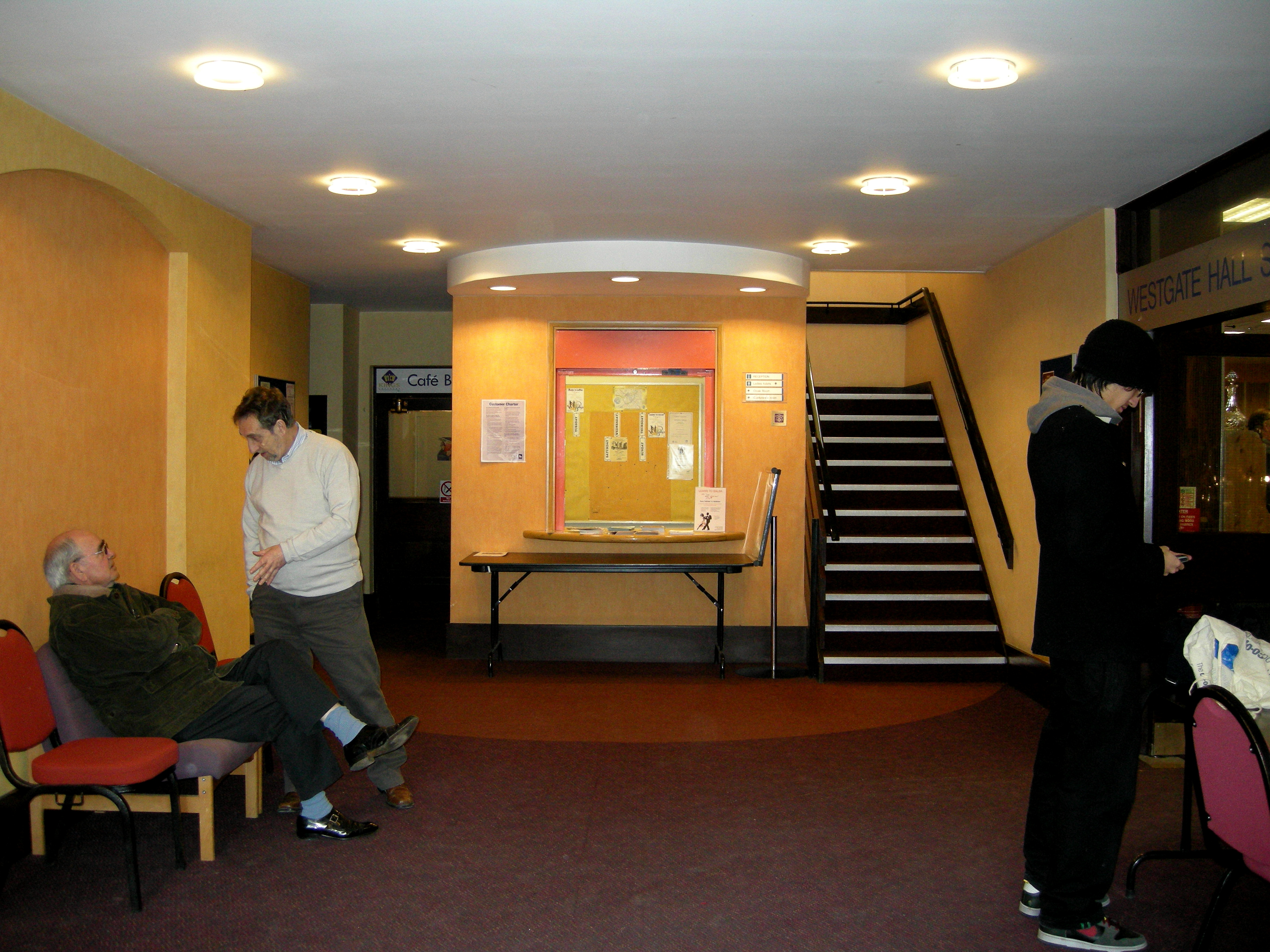
Art Deco entrance hall, in 2010

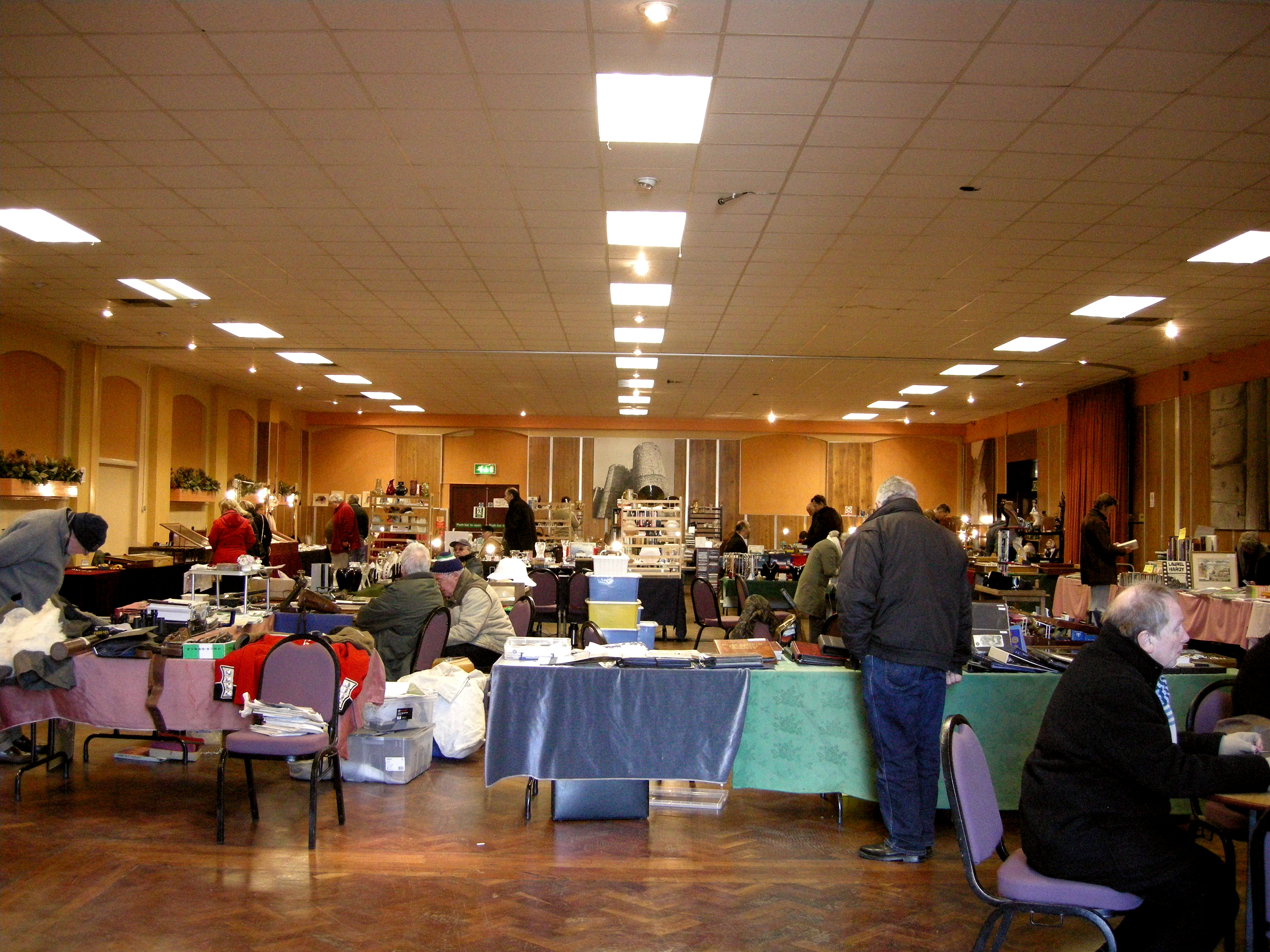
Antiques fair in the dance hall, 2010

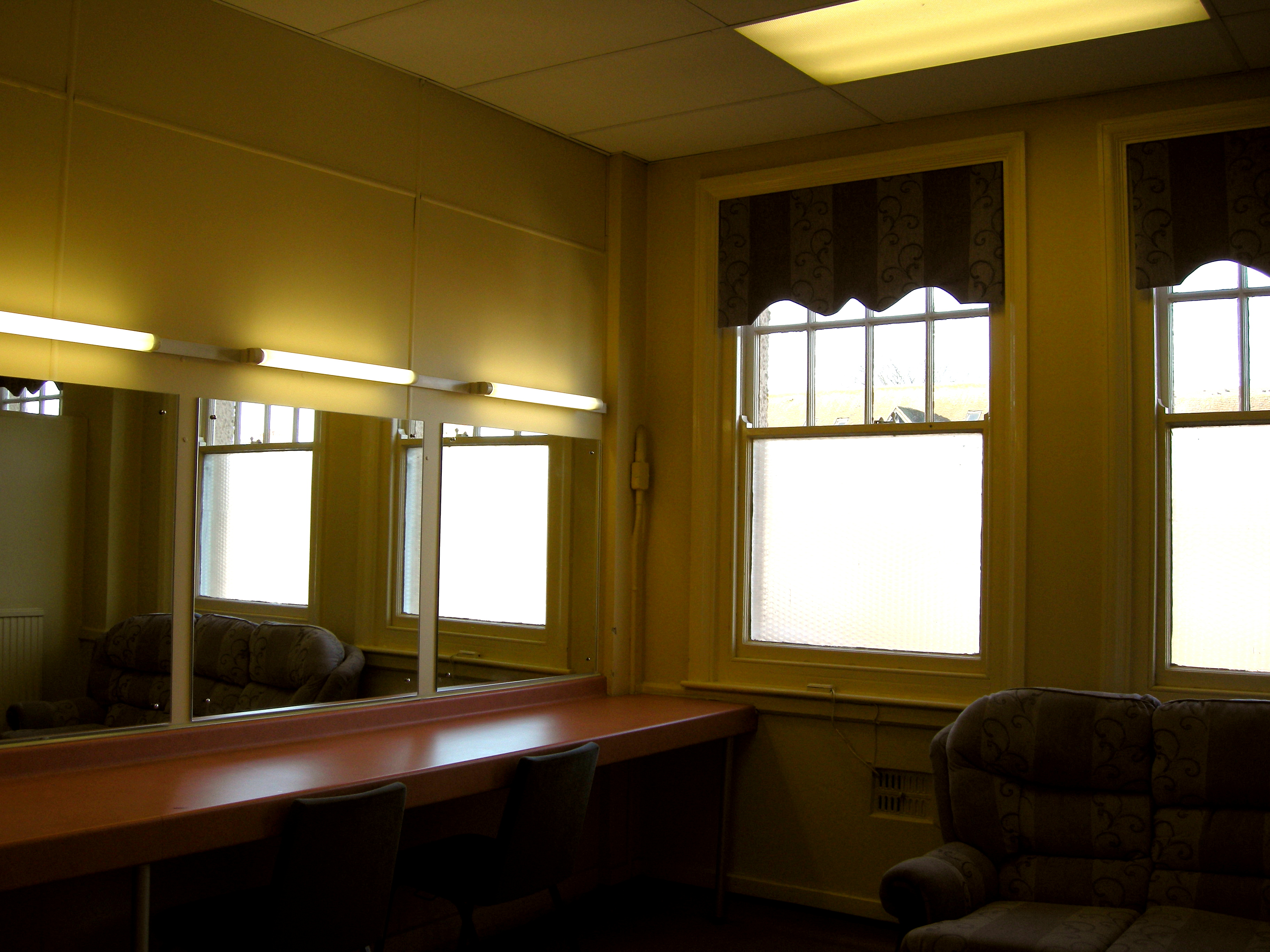
Ladies' powder room on first floor, showing original window frames, 2010

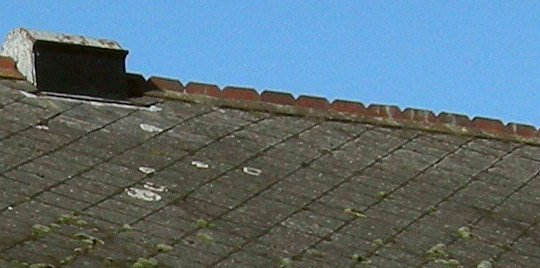
Fancy tiles, edging and ventilator on roof of hall

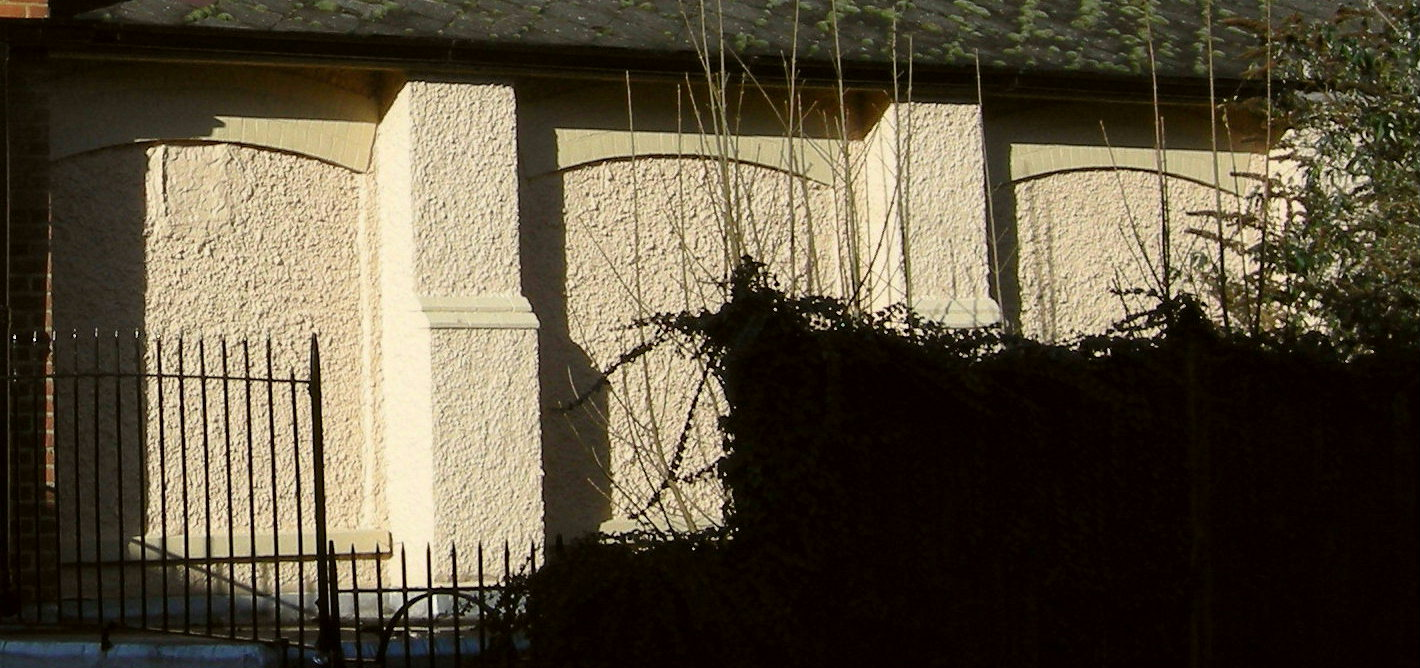
This was once a light and pleasant building with large windows all round

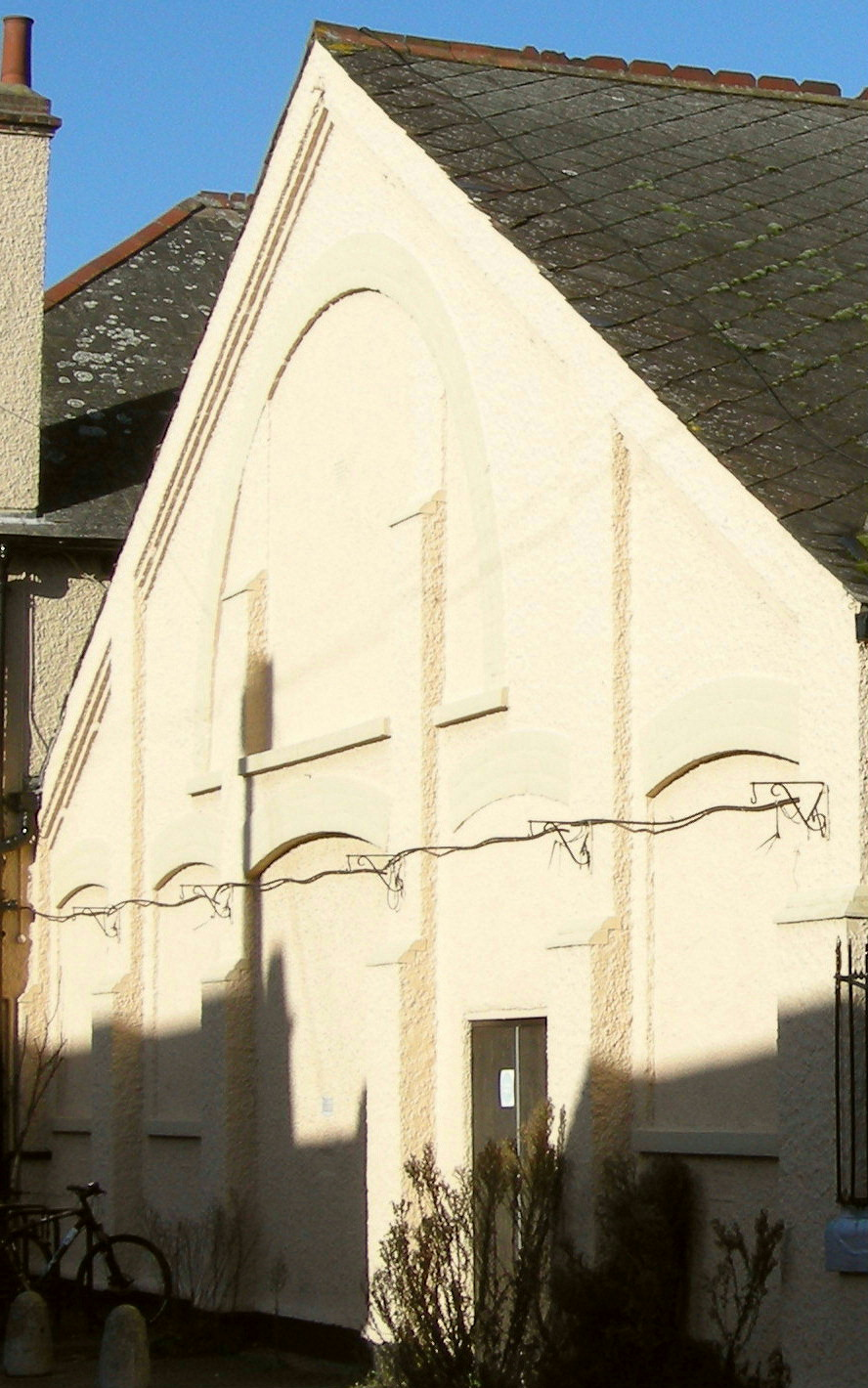
There were once large, fancy windows at both ends of the hall

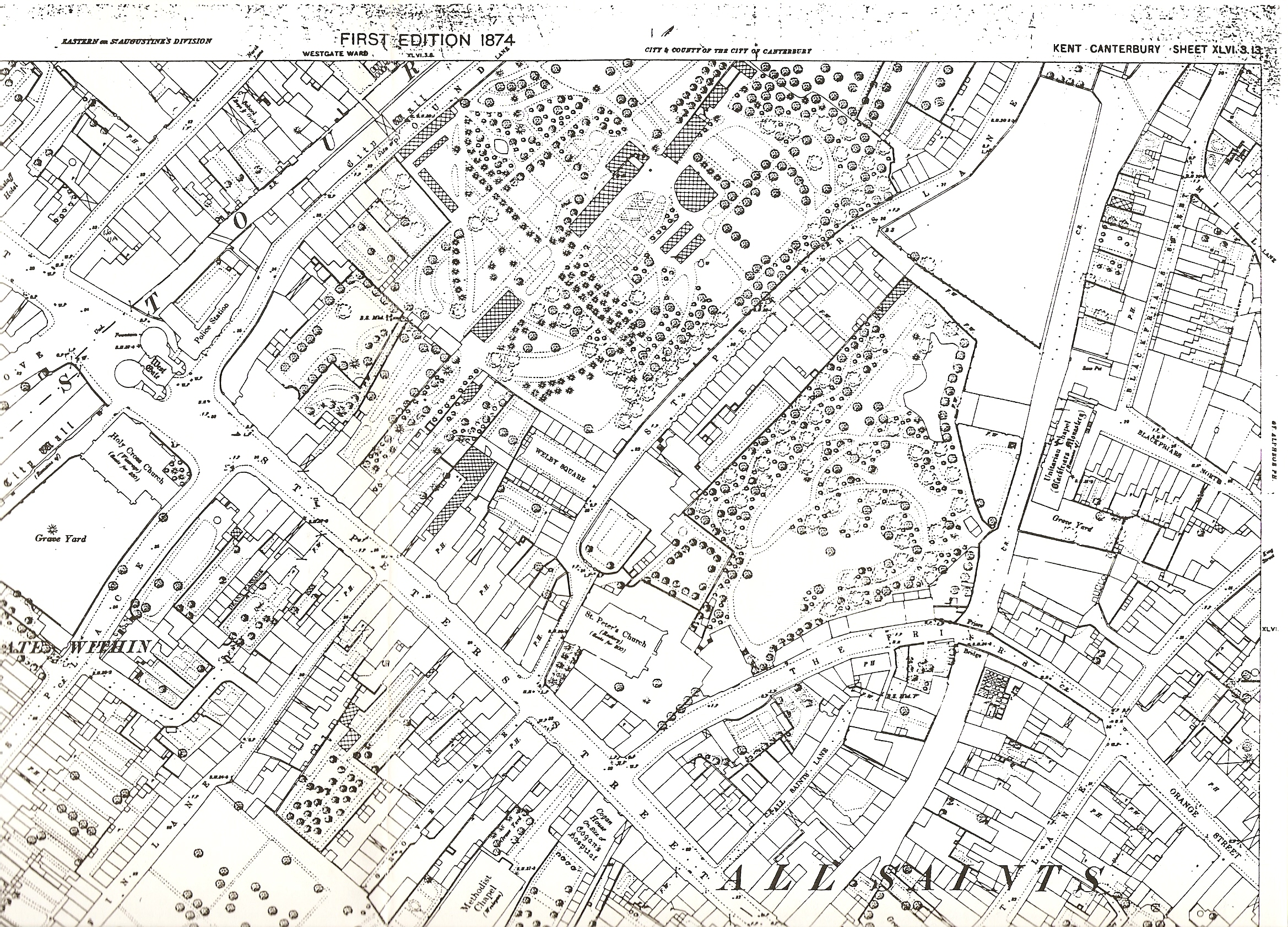
1874 map of Westgate showing Welby Square and gardens before Westgate Hall was built

== See also ==
- Herne Bay Museum
- Roman Museum
- Westgate, Canterbury
- Whitstable Museum and Gallery

== Bibliography ==
- Anon, Images of Canterbury (Kent Messenger Group, 1997) p. 175a (photo of Field Marshal Montgomery visiting hall in 1948)
- Butler, D., Canterbury: A Second Selection in Old Photographs (Sutton, 1993) p. 154. (photo of army recruits outside hall, 1915)
- Butler, D., A Century of Canterbury (2002), p. 12 (cityscape photograph showing hall, 1900)

== Further research ==
- Archives at the Centre for Kentish Studies at Maidstone
- British Library Newspaper library at Colindale
- Archives entitled "City Boxes in Basement 1787-1958" under listing of "Buildings correspondence, City Council 'Property" at Canterbury Cathedral archives
- Files under "General Purpose Committee 1881–1912" CCA-CC-BB/131F at Canterbury Cathedral archives
- Series of files held at Canterbury Cathedral archives on the "Markets & Parks Committee from circa 1950-1975" ref. CCA-CC-A/SC/1290/1-5
