= Canterbury Roman Museum =

Museum in Kent, England

Coordinates: 51°16′44″N 1°04′53″E

Roman Museum
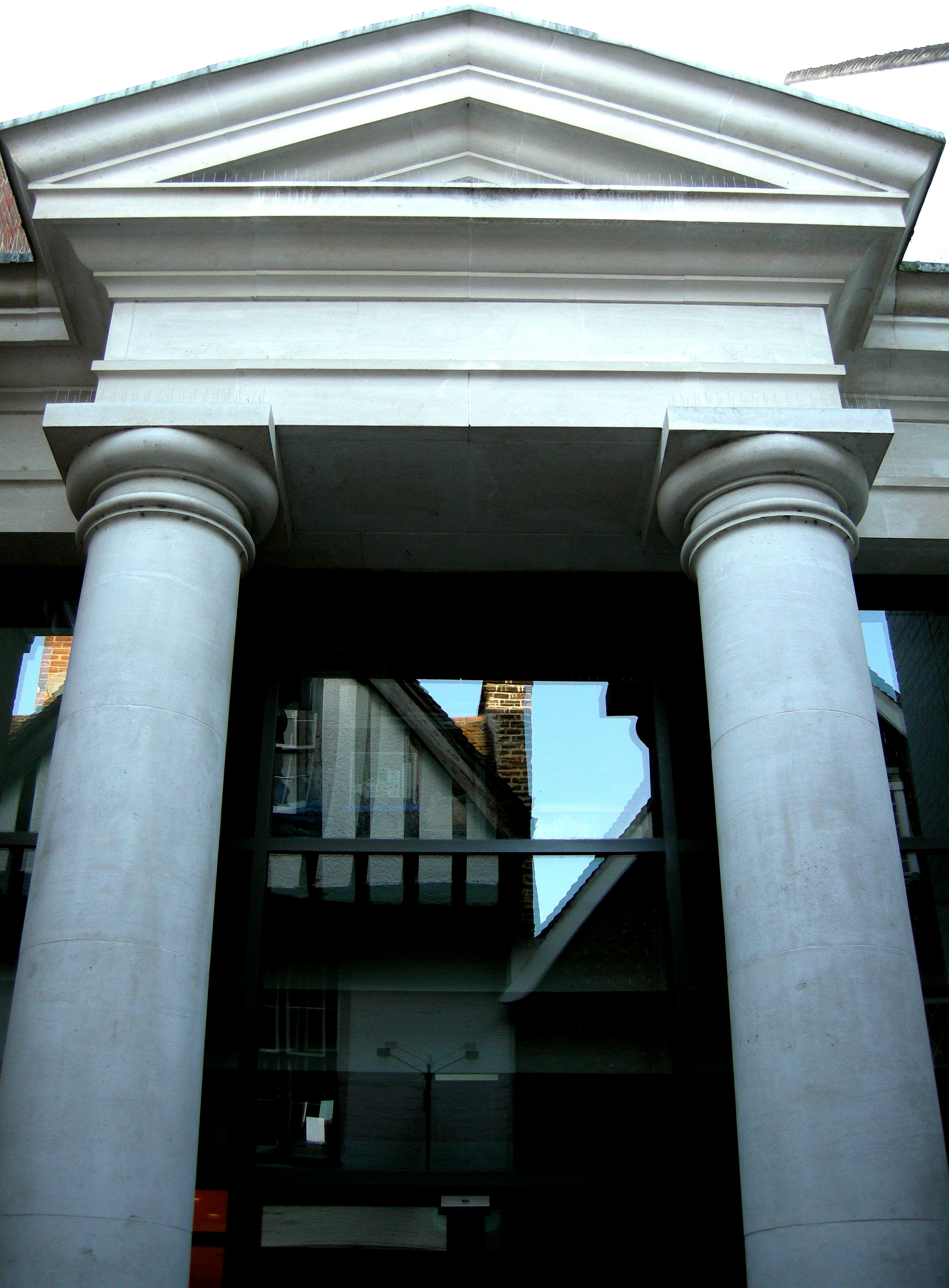
- Entrance in Butchery Lane, Canterbury
- Established: 1961; 1994 after refurbishment
- Location: 11a Butchery Lane, Canterbury, Kent, CT1 2JR
- Type: Scheduled monument, heritage centre
- Collection size: Roman pavement; excavated Roman artefacts
- Public transit access: Rail: Canterbury West; Canterbury East; Buses: National Express, Stagecoach
- Website: Canterbury Roman Museum

The Canterbury Roman Museum in Canterbury, Kent, houses a Roman pavement which is a scheduled monument, in the remains of a Roman courtyard house which itself is a grade I listed building. The pavement was discovered after World War II bombing, and has been open to the public since 1946. The museum was established in 1961. It houses many excavated artifacts from Roman Canterbury, including the important late Roman silver hoard known as the Canterbury Treasure, together with reconstructions of the Roman town.

== History ==
=== Background ===
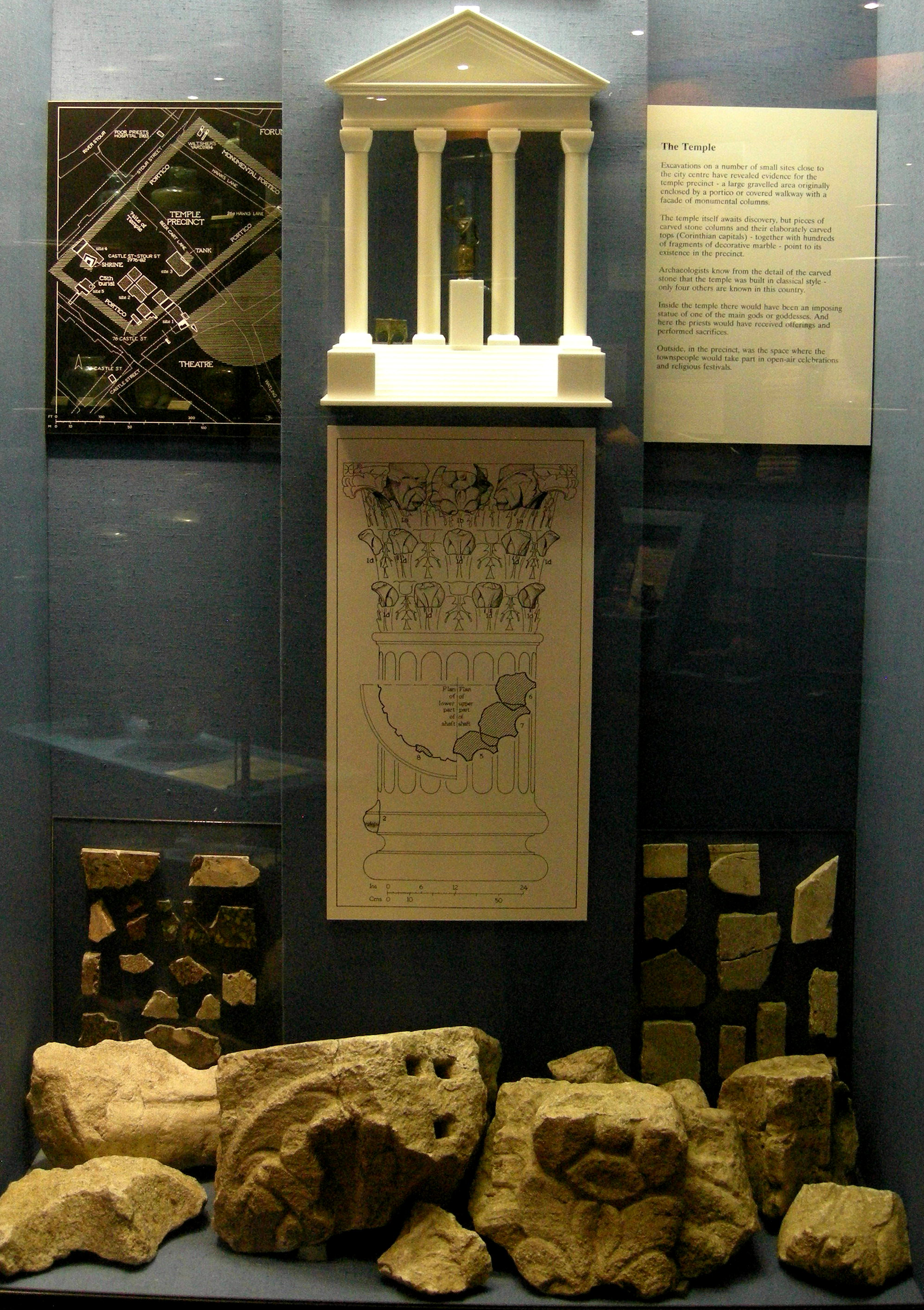
Display showing temple pieces from Longmarket site

In the first century AD the Cantiaci were the inhabitants of Kent when the Romans captured a settlement on the River Stour and later called it Durovernum Cantiacorum, or stronghold of the Cantiaci by an Alder marsh. The new settlement was laid out as a partially grid-patterned town with a theatre, temple, forum and baths. In the late third century, to defend against attack from barbarians a town wall was built with seven gates. The town then covered 130 acres or 53 hectares.

Roman Canterbury reached the height of its development around 300 AD. The Roman townhouse which contained the pavement was surrounded by public buildings. The temple precinct was partially excavated in 1976–1982, but the temple itself was not found. The townhouse associated with the pavement may have been used until about 410 AD when the Roman administration left Britain.

=== Discovery, protection and display ===
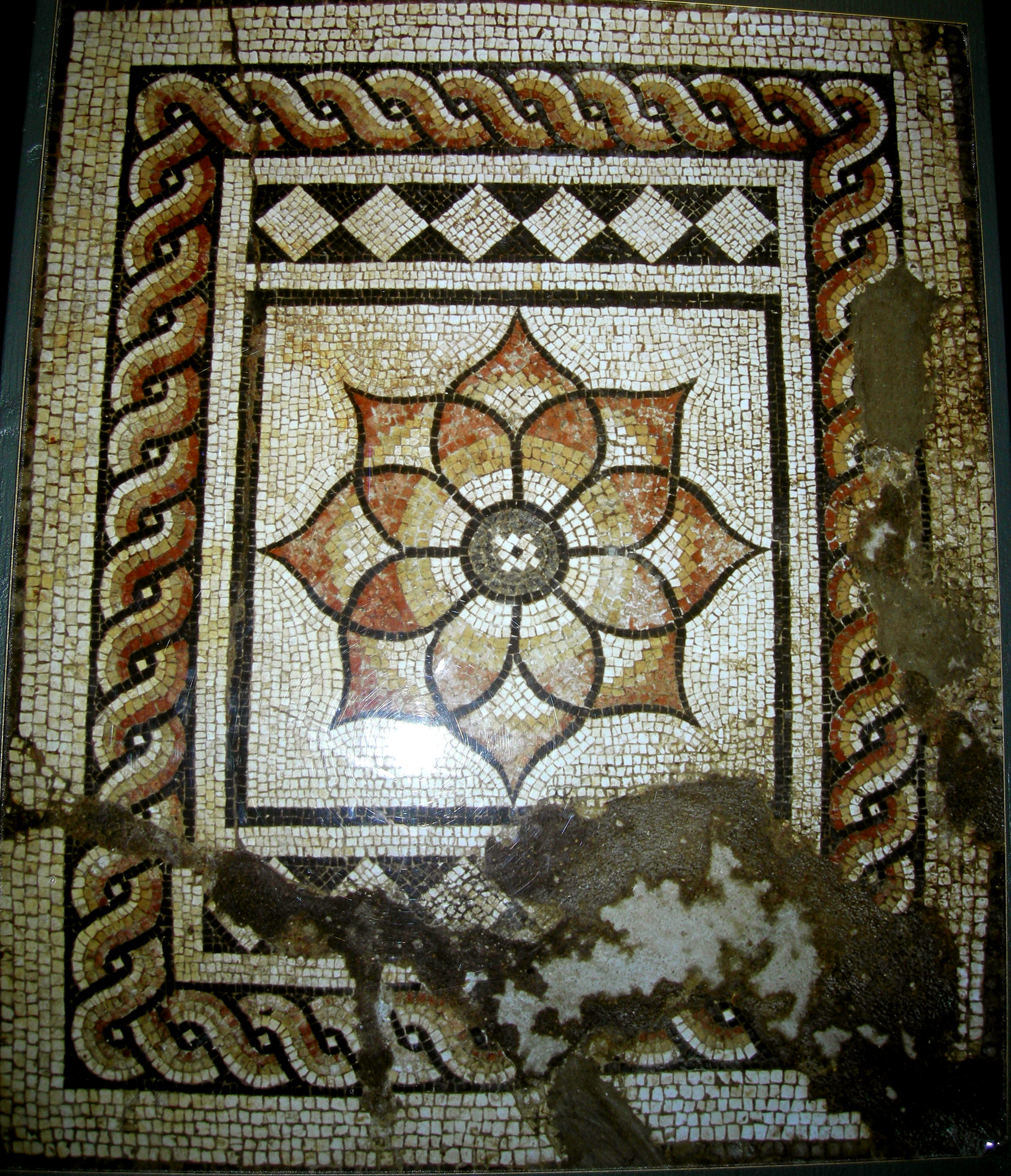
Display showing mosaic corridor panel

The pavement was discovered after a World War II bombing on 1 June 1942, and excavations were carried out by Audrey Williams and Sheppard Frere between 1945 and 1946. Public access was permitted from 1946, and the site was visited by royalty. Between 1958 and 1961 it was re-excavated by Dr. F. Jenkins, and the Roman Pavement Museum was established above it. The museum was re-established as the Roman Museum in 1994 after refurbishment. It is listed at Kent County Council as a scheduled monument, number KE89. It was excavated again in 1990 by the Canterbury Archaeological Trust. This is the best local example of a Roman townhouse; they found that this masonry building had undergone many alterations over a long period, adding several rooms, corridors and mosaics before abandonment in the 5th century. Parts of one of the largest theatres in Britain had been located beneath nearby streets and buildings. Substantial elements of public baths have been excavated underneath modern buildings in St Margaret's Street. Enigmatic traces of the Forum Basilica can be found under the High Street.

The museum was designed not only to involve the public in its own history and heritage, but also to commemorate and celebrate the many archaeologists who have been wresting the history of Canterbury from the soil since about 1857, when John Brent became one of the founder members of Kent Archaeological Society.

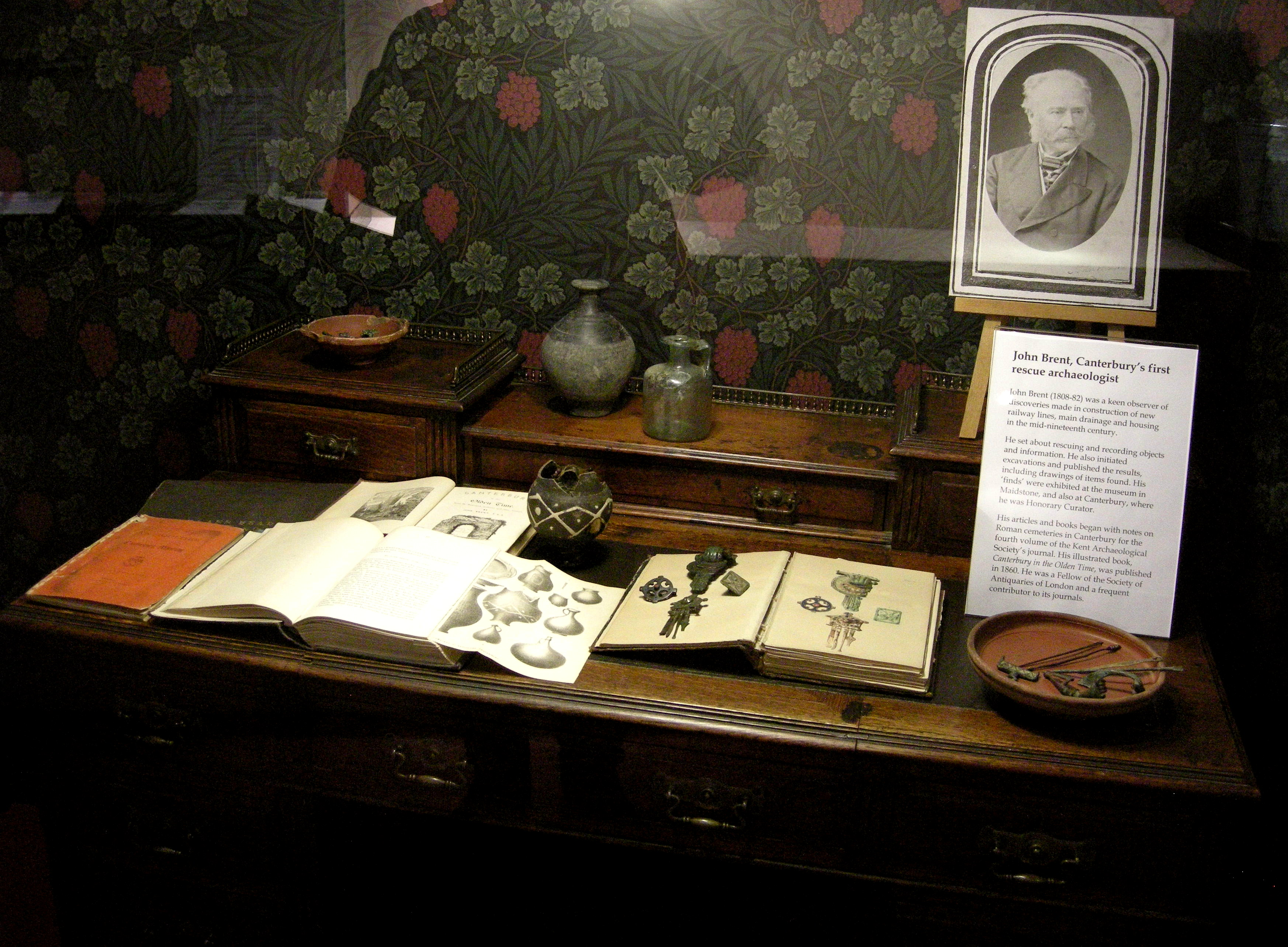
Display commemorating archaeologist John Brent

The museum aims to show what the Roman city was like, and to reveal the secret city beneath the feet of the visitor, thereby educating the public to appreciate local history. Each step by which one descends to the Roman pavement represents 100 years-worth of archaeological layers down to the 300 AD layer of the pavement.

== Exhibits ==
=== Mosaic pavement ===
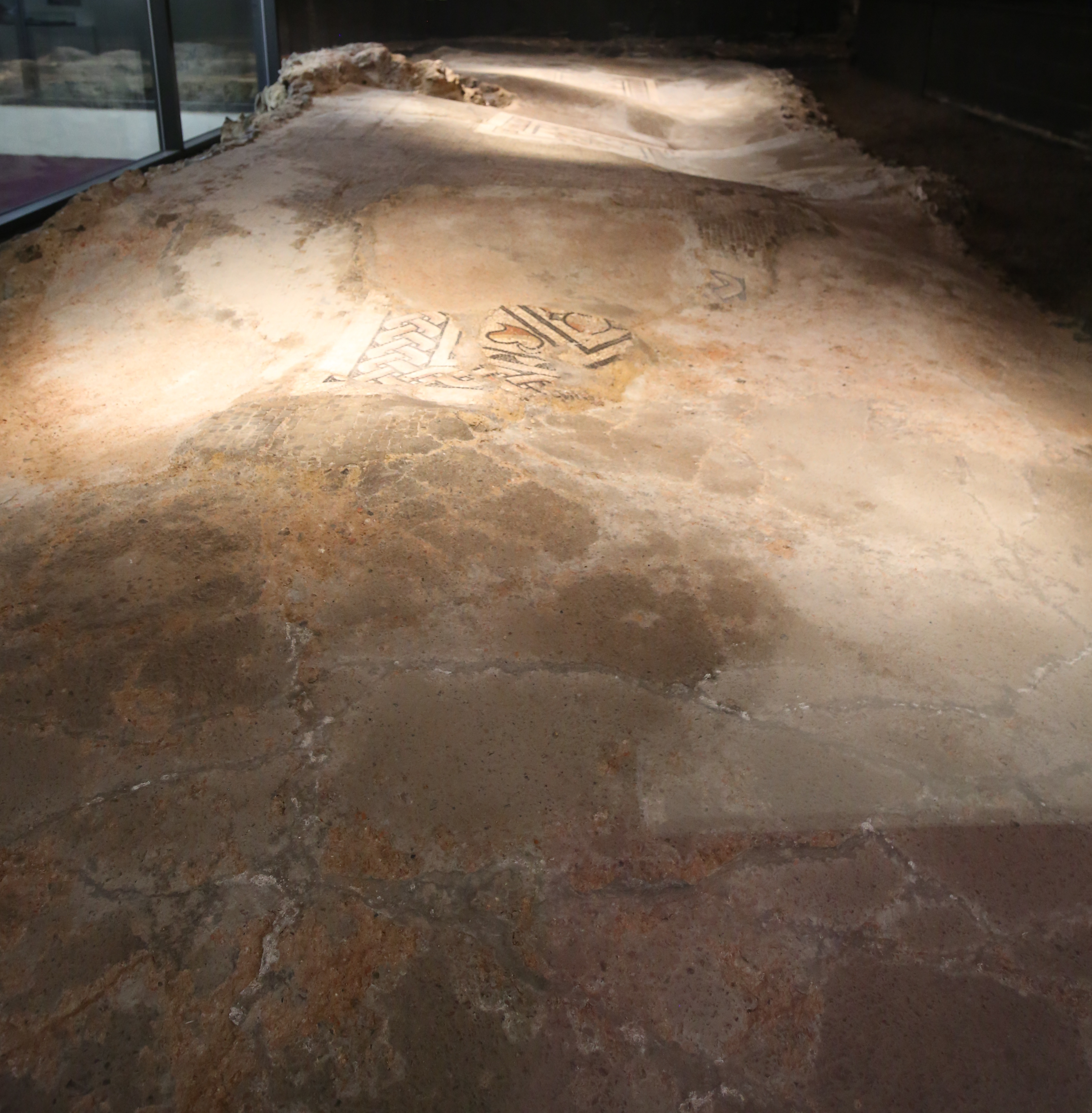
Mosaic corridor panel in situ

Generations of building at Canterbury have raised the level of the town since Roman times so that the pavement, with preserved remains of a town house with hypocaust, is exhibited in situ underground. The scheduled monument listing describes the pavement thus: "The excavations of 1945−1946 uncovered a series of three mosaic panels which decorate the remains of a corridor of a Roman house". It dates from around 300 AD and is preserved with an air conditioning system.

=== Excavated artefacts ===
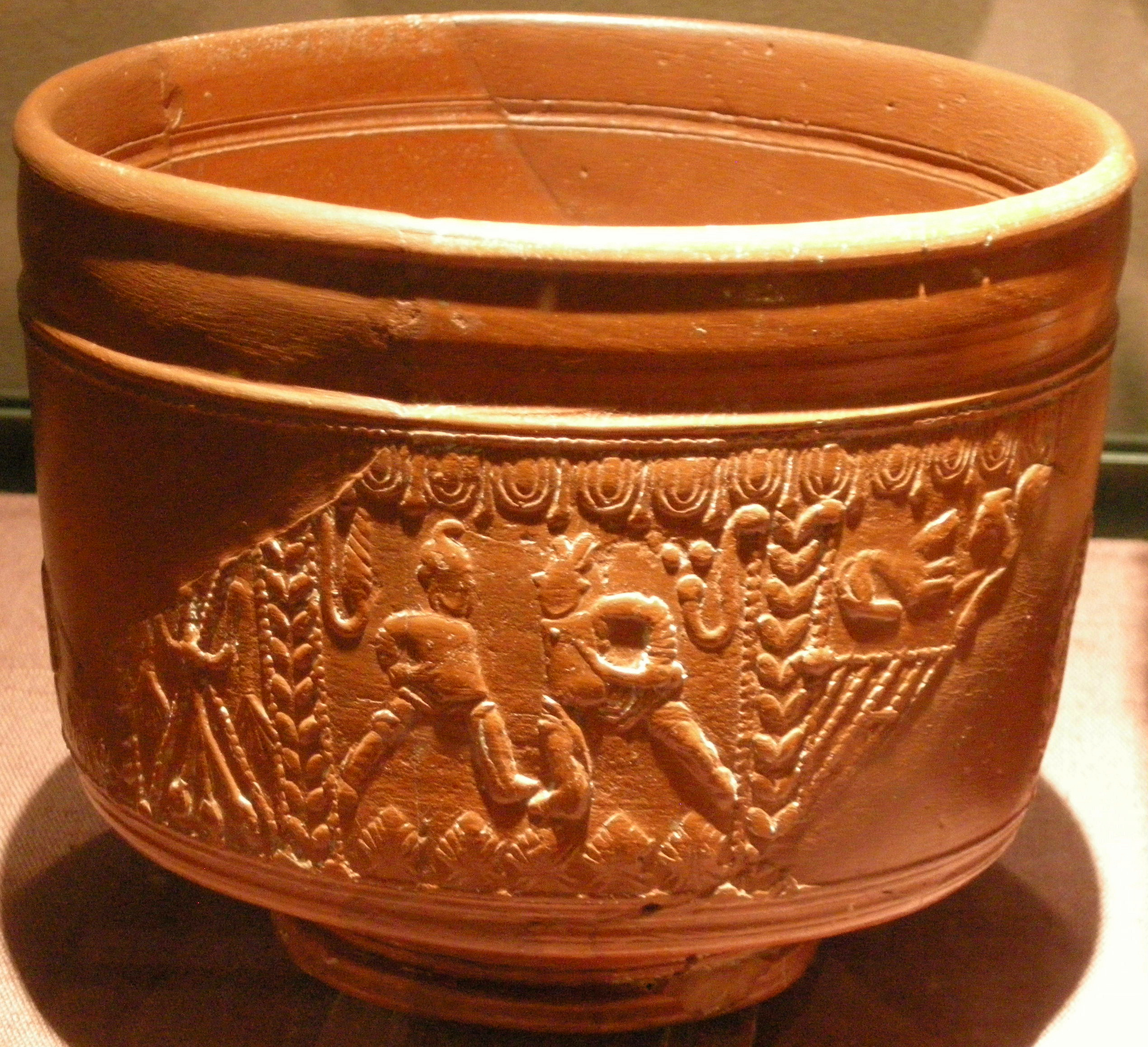
Samian ware pot showing gladiators

Excavated objects such as household deities, including one in the form of a horse, are shown here. There is a lot of Roman glass including some decorated examples, silver spoons, an axe, tweezers, a plumb weight and dice. The 5th century AD silver hoard was excavated at Westgate Gardens in 1962. Military artefacts include metal parts of cavalry harness which have been reconstructed with new leather straps and a pair of cavalry swords (spathae) recovered from a double burial, possibly a murder. Roof tiles and floor tiles are also exhibited, one displaying a dog's footprints.

=== Reconstructions ===
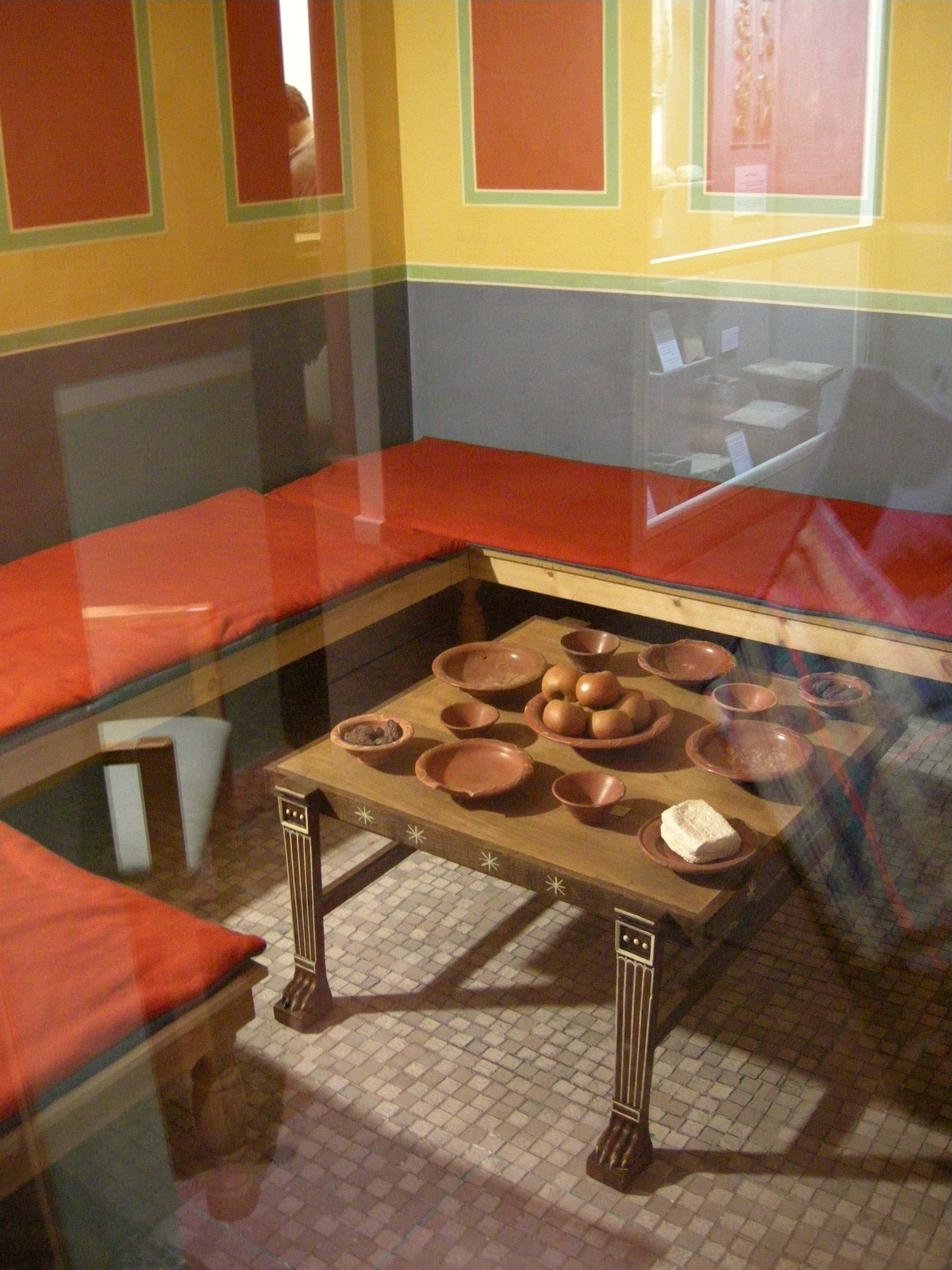
Reconstruction of room, with real Roman pottery

The museum contains a reconstructed Roman house with kitchen, and a Roman market place - probably situated in the forum - with cobbler, haberdasher, greengrocer and fast food seller. The cobbler exhibit is a consequence of archaeologists finding cut-out pieces of leather for sandals. The original cut-out leather pieces are exhibited along with reconstructions of the sandals being made. These sandals had reinforced soles. A computer screen demonstrates the possible appearance of the house in Roman Britain, with images of the pavement being excavated. The time-tunnel display explains the end of the Roman occupation of the town, and the time-view painting displays Roman Canterbury as it was in later periods.

=== Interactive features ===
An interactive screen enables visitors to tour the Temple site of Roman Canterbury. Before leaving, the visitor can handle actual Roman artefacts, alongside a guide to identifying the objects. The "Make your own magnetic mosaics" and "Dress like a Roman" activities are intended to entertain and educate all ages.

== Listing details ==
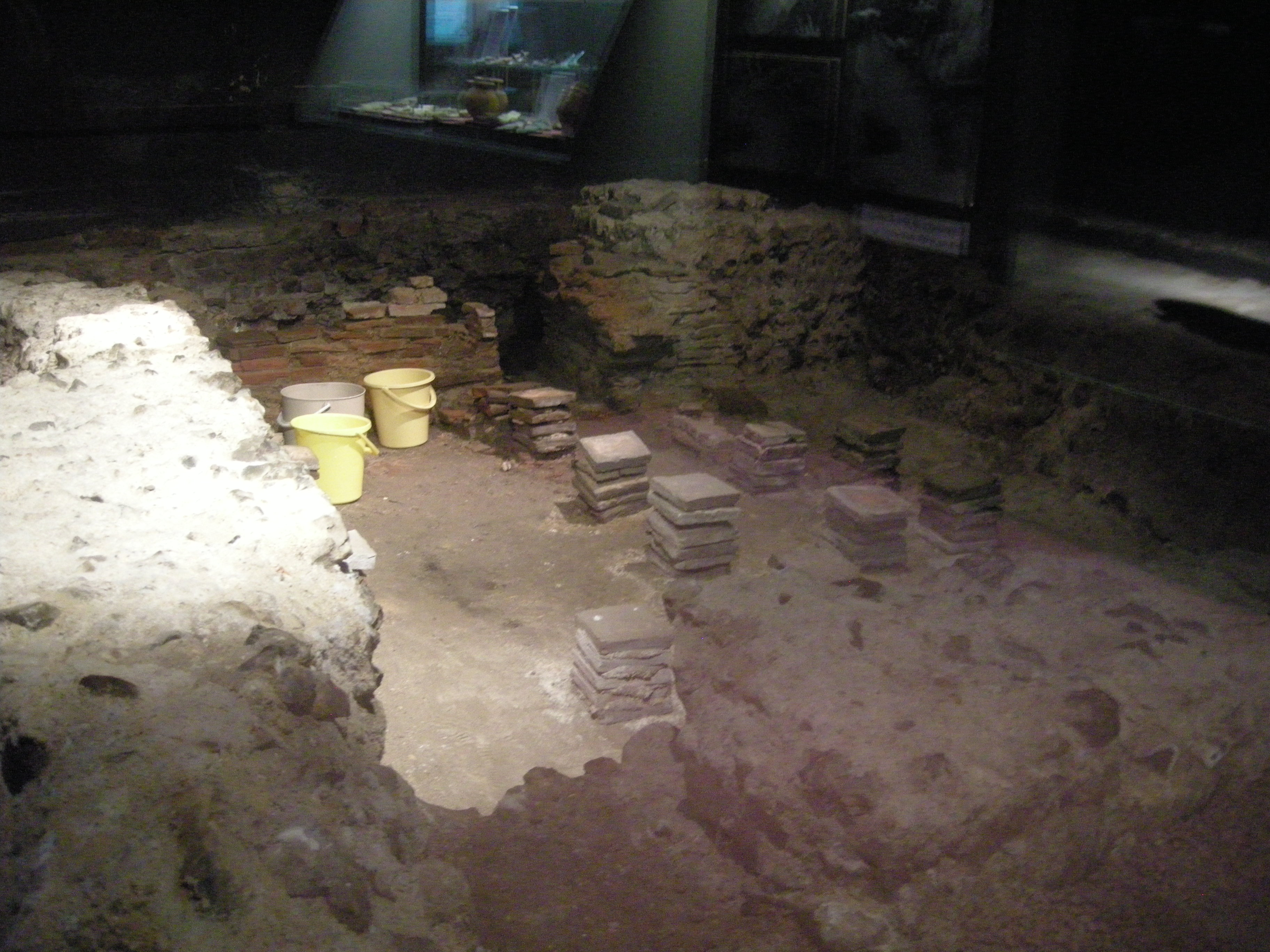
Room with hypocaust, and firebox behind. Walls are Grade I listed

This is a Grade I listed building with SMR number TR15NE50-MKE4540 in location TR 15005778. The official description as listed is as follows:

Roman Courtyard House. Site of a large courtyard house c100 AD. A pavement is preserved in a basement and open to the public.Scheduled. (1-2) Remains of Roman town house, St George's Street. Grade 1. Part of a Roman town house. There are remains of tessellated pavements c300 AD and a hypocaust system. Brick walls about 3ft in height and 13 pillars. Scheduled as on AM. (3) The Butchery Lane Roman building was first excavated in 1945–6 by Audrey Williams and Sheppard Frere. In 1958–61 the cellars in which the building was found was enlarged and converted into the 'Roman Pavement' Museum. Several more walls and other features were discovered by Dr. F. Jenkins during this work (see illustration card). A hoard of 50 third century cordiate coins was found in the area west of the hypocaust stokehole in the Roman building in Butchery Lane. (4-6) TR 150577. Roman site, Butchery Lane. Scheduled No 89. (7)

Other Statuses and Cross-References: Monarch Uid 464392 (Active); Listed Building (I) NAR (Active); Scheduled Monument KENT 89 (Active); National Monuments Record TR 15 NE 50 (Active).

== Resolved fears of closure ==
The museum was under threat of closure in 2009, pending a decision by Canterbury City Council on 18 February 2010. This caused widespread controversy. In the event the Council voted to close the museums in 2011, but said it would fund them for the financial year 2010−2011 whilst working with other organisations to examine ways of keeping the museums open. Meanwhile, the entry fee for the museum was expected to be doubled during 2011. The situation is now resolved, but this is now part of the history of the museum.

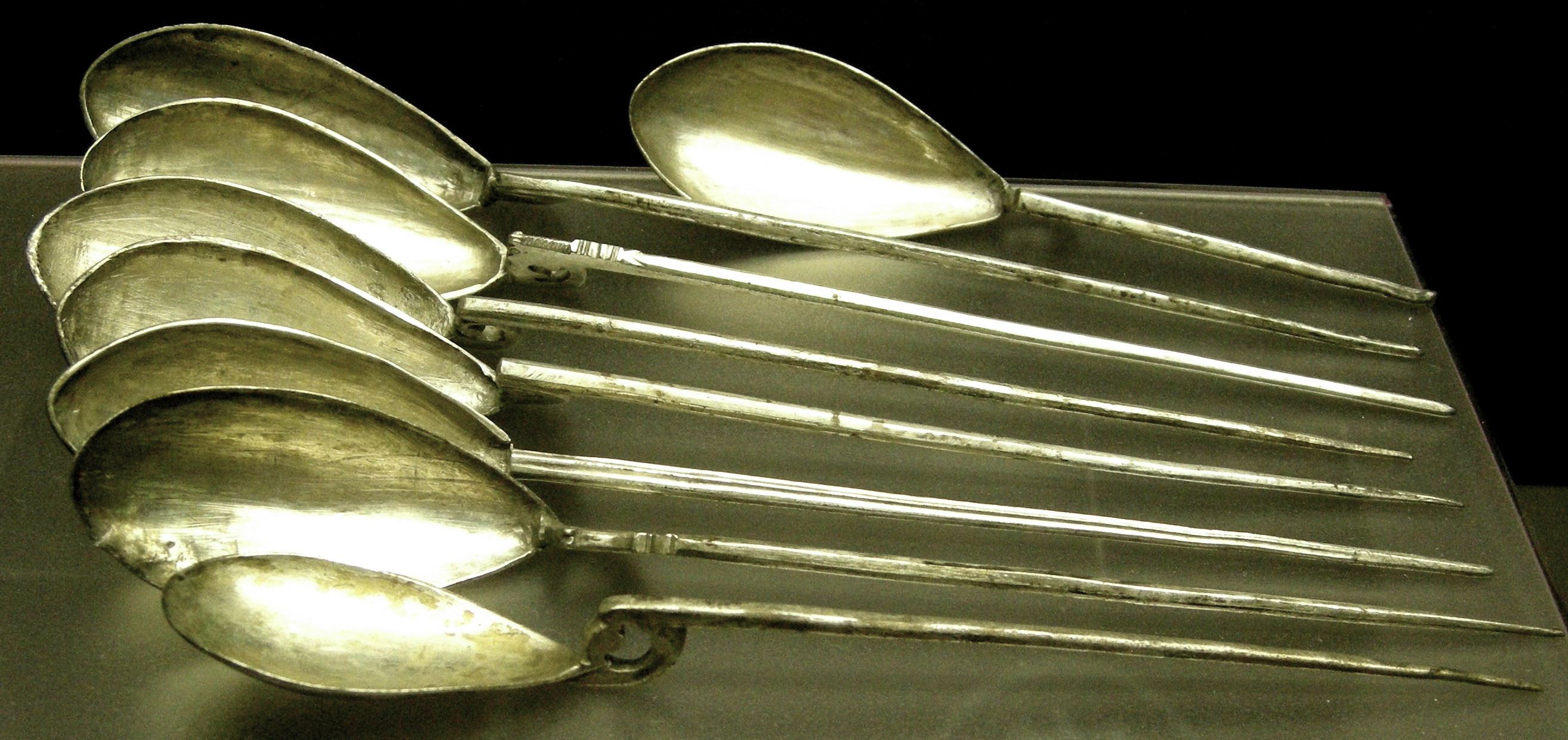
Early 5th-century Roman silver spoons from the Canterbury Treasure, found in the Longmarket area of the city.

== See also ==
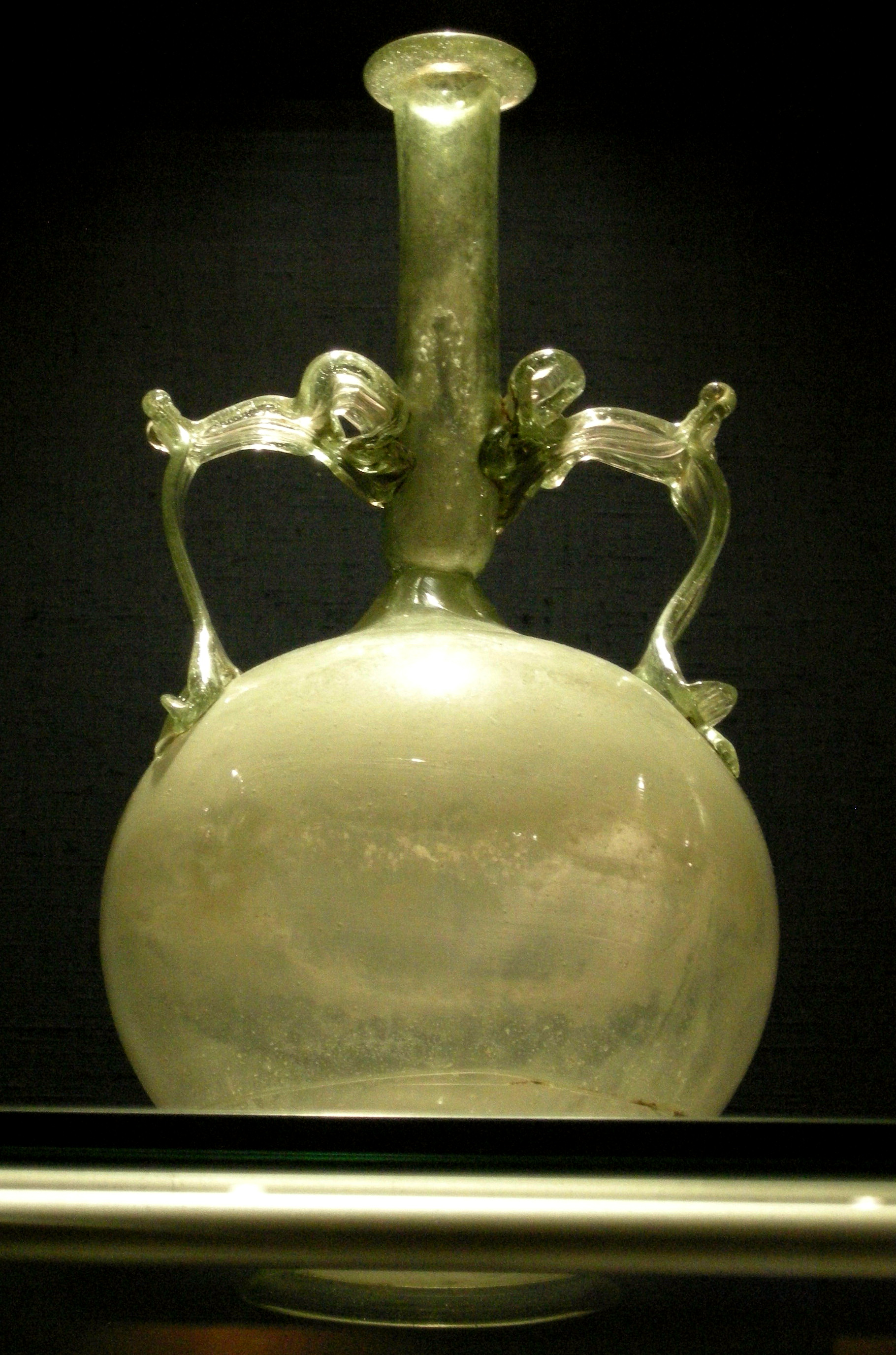
Roman bottle found at Longmarket site

- Herne Bay Museum
- Westgate, Canterbury
- Westgate Hall, Canterbury
- Whitstable Museum and Gallery
