= Durovernum Cantiacorum =

Canterbury during the Roman Empire

Coordinates: 51°16′43″N 1°4′55″E

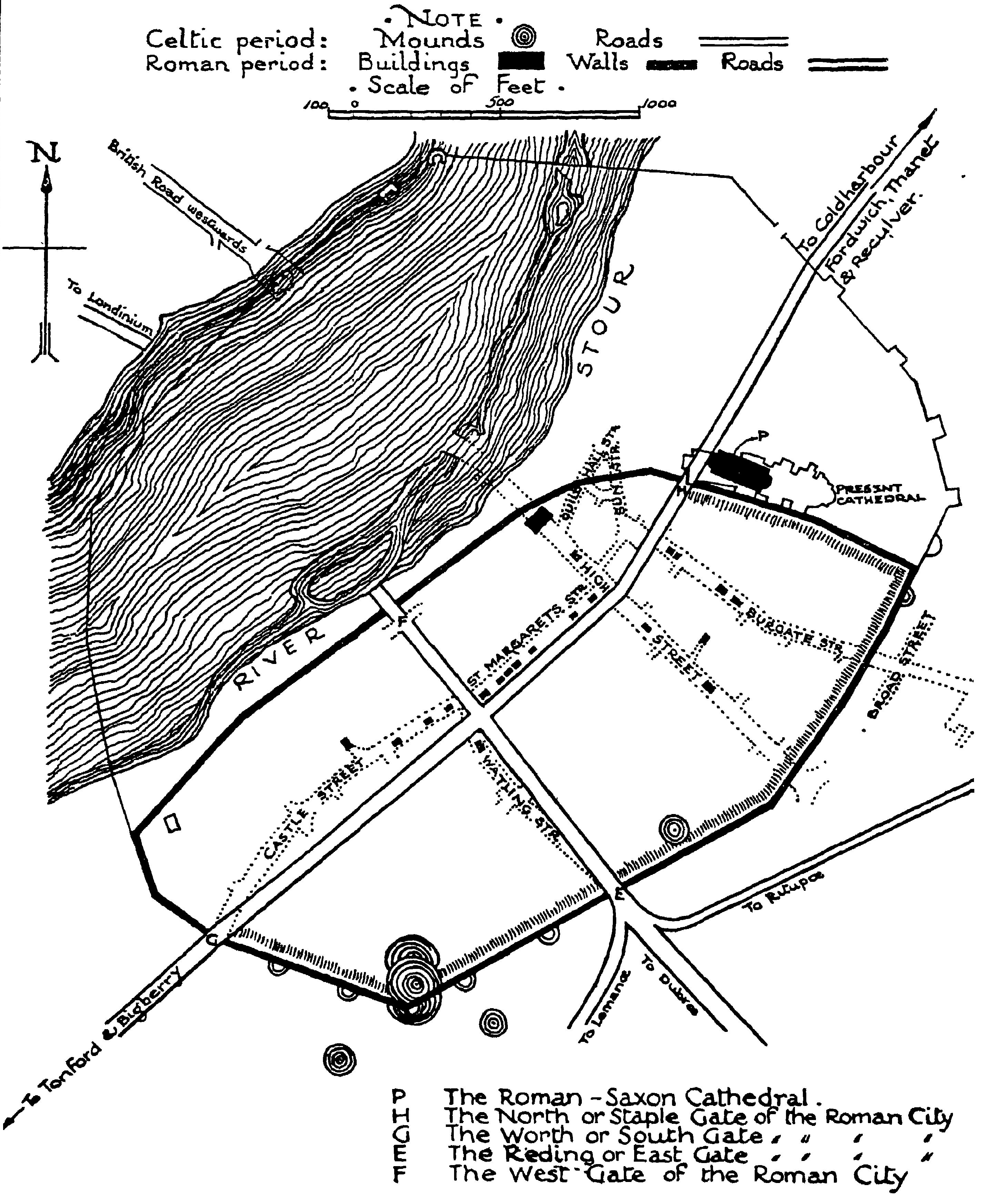
Plan of Durovernum, from The Saxon Cathedral at Canterbury and The Saxon Saints Buried Therein

Durovernum Cantiacorum was a town and hillfort (Latin: oppidum) in Roman Britain at the site of present-day Canterbury in Kent. It occupied a strategic location on Watling Street at the best local crossing of the Stour, which prompted a convergence of roads connected to the ports of Dubris (Dover), Rutupiae (Richborough), Regulbium (Reculver) and Portus Lemanis (Lympne). Considerable archaeological evidence of Roman activity has been found in Canterbury, much of which can now be found in the Roman Museum built on the remains of a Roman townhouse.

== Beginning ==
The name Durovernum Cantiacorum is Latin for "Durovernum of the Cantiaci", preserving the name of an earlier British town whose ancient British name has been reconstructed as *Durou̯ernon ("Stronghold by the Alder Grove"), although the name is sometimes supposed to have derived from various British names for the Stour. The Iron-Age oppidum at the site was triple-ditched. The site seems to have been occupied and fortified by the Romans shortly after their invasion in AD 43. Military occupation continued until at least the time of Boudica's rebellion.

== Development ==
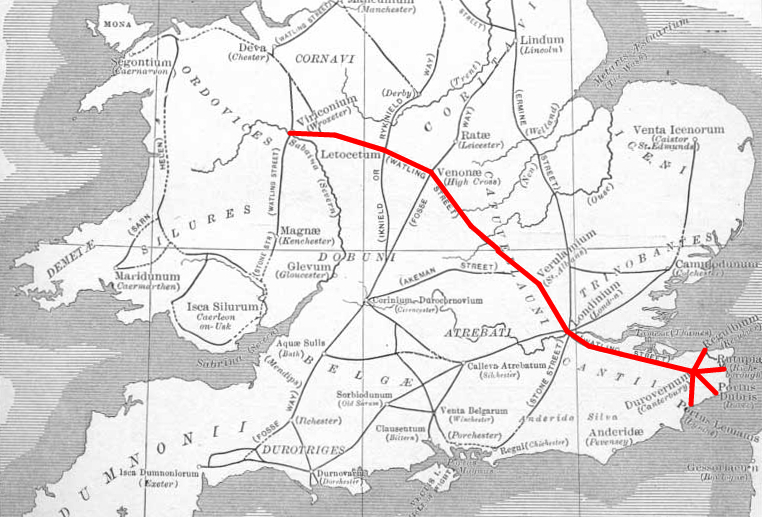
Watling Street linked Britain to the rest of the Roman Empire.

There is no evidence of much development in Durovernum until the Flavian period (69-96), after demilitarisation. It became the civitas capital of the Cantiaci (Cantii) tribes.

A large religious and administrative complex was soon established at its centre, consisting of forum and basilica, temple enclosure and theatre. The theatre, originally built around AD 80, was totally rebuilt in the early 3rd century. It was probably associated with religious festivals as much as the dramatic arts. The public baths were just to the north-east. A number of other possible temple and/or church sites have also been identified. The town was enclosed by defensive walls in the late 3rd century and was given single-arched gateways. Private buildings within the walls were originally of timber, but were later replaced with stone and some furnished with mosaic floors. An extensive complex of wooden pipes serviced the town. Industries included brick, tile and pottery production, as well as bronze working. There were many commercial shops, notably a baker's shop with donkey-driven millstone. Cemeteries outside the town appear to have continued in Christian use and St Martin's Church appears to be built around an old Roman mausoleum which stood in one of these.

== Decline ==
Because of its links with Gaul, Durovernum seems to have survived in good order until the Roman administration left around AD 410. However, after that, its decline was rapid. Mercenaries were hired to defend the town but they revolted. By the time of the Battle of Aylesford in the mid-5th century, the Jutes had taken over the area. The British and Latin name survived as the medieval Latin placename Dorobernia or Dorovernia, but the town also became known in Old Welsh as Cair Ceint ("Fortress of Kent") and in Old English as Cantwareburh ("Kentish Stronghold"), which developed into the modern "Canterbury".

== Archaeology ==
The Canterbury Roman Museum houses Roman artifacts from across the town, as well as an in situ Roman town house and its mosaics.

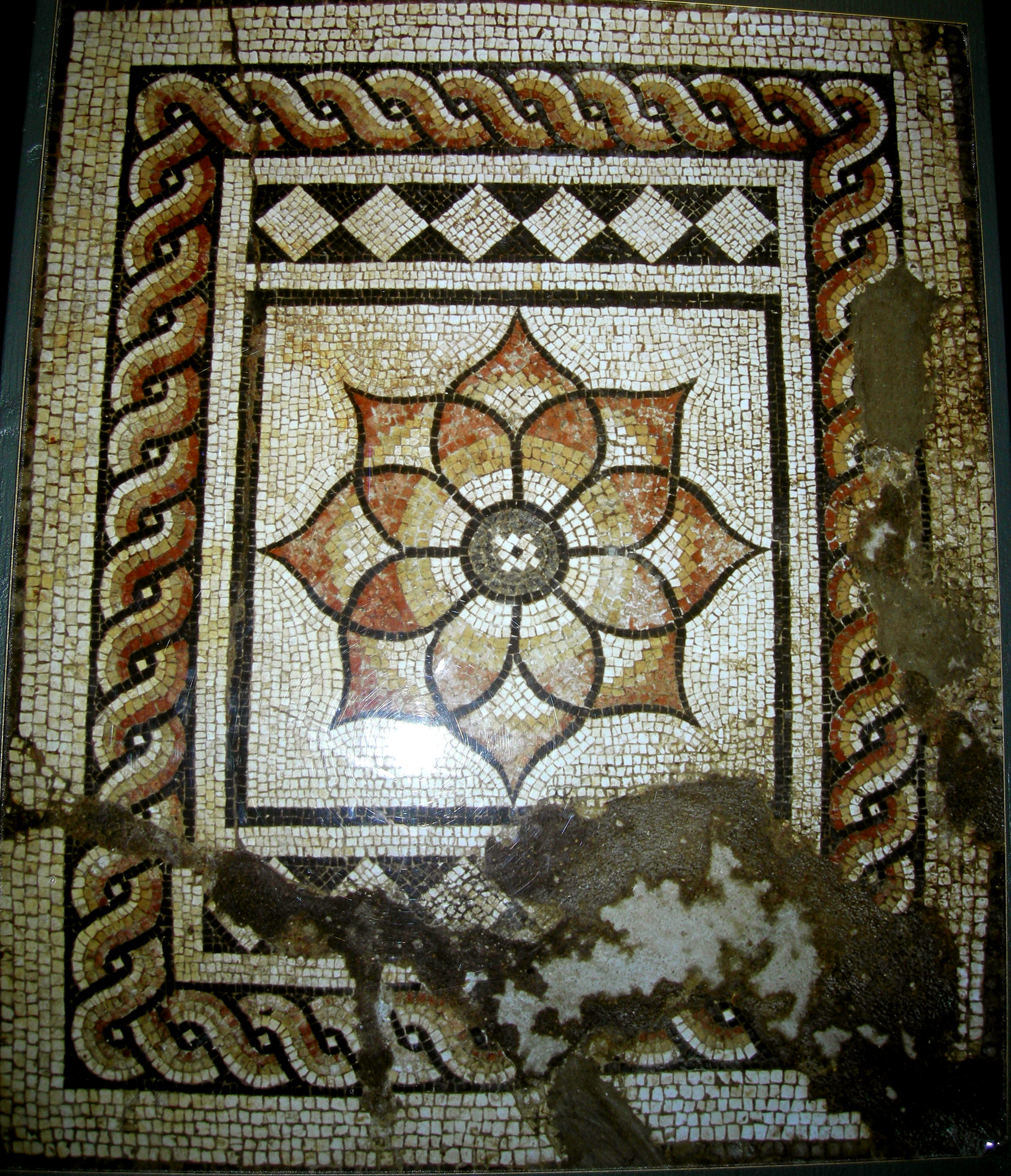
Mosaic corridor panel from Durovernum, now in the Roman Museum.

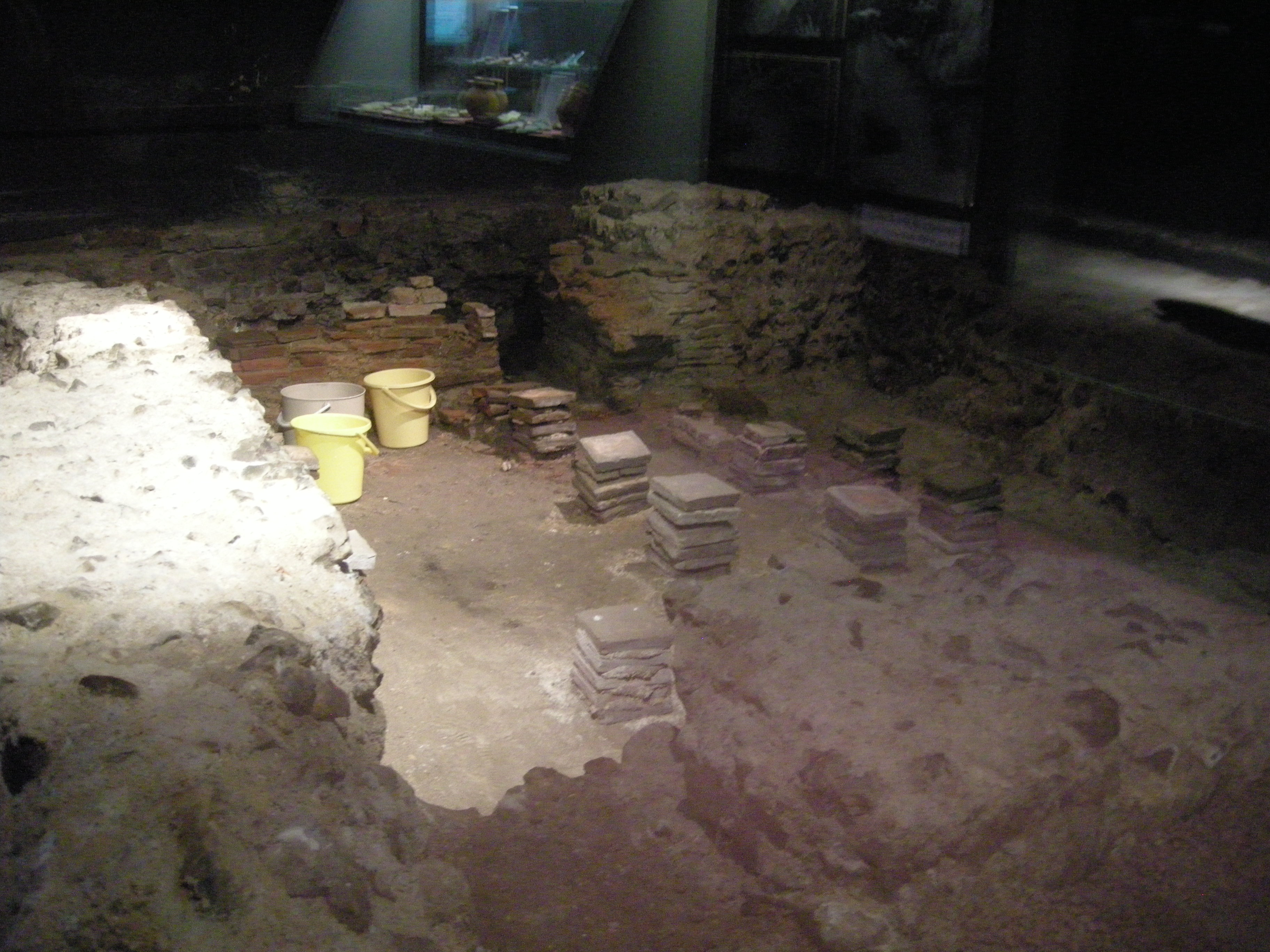
Hypocaust of the townhouse discovered in Butchery Lane.

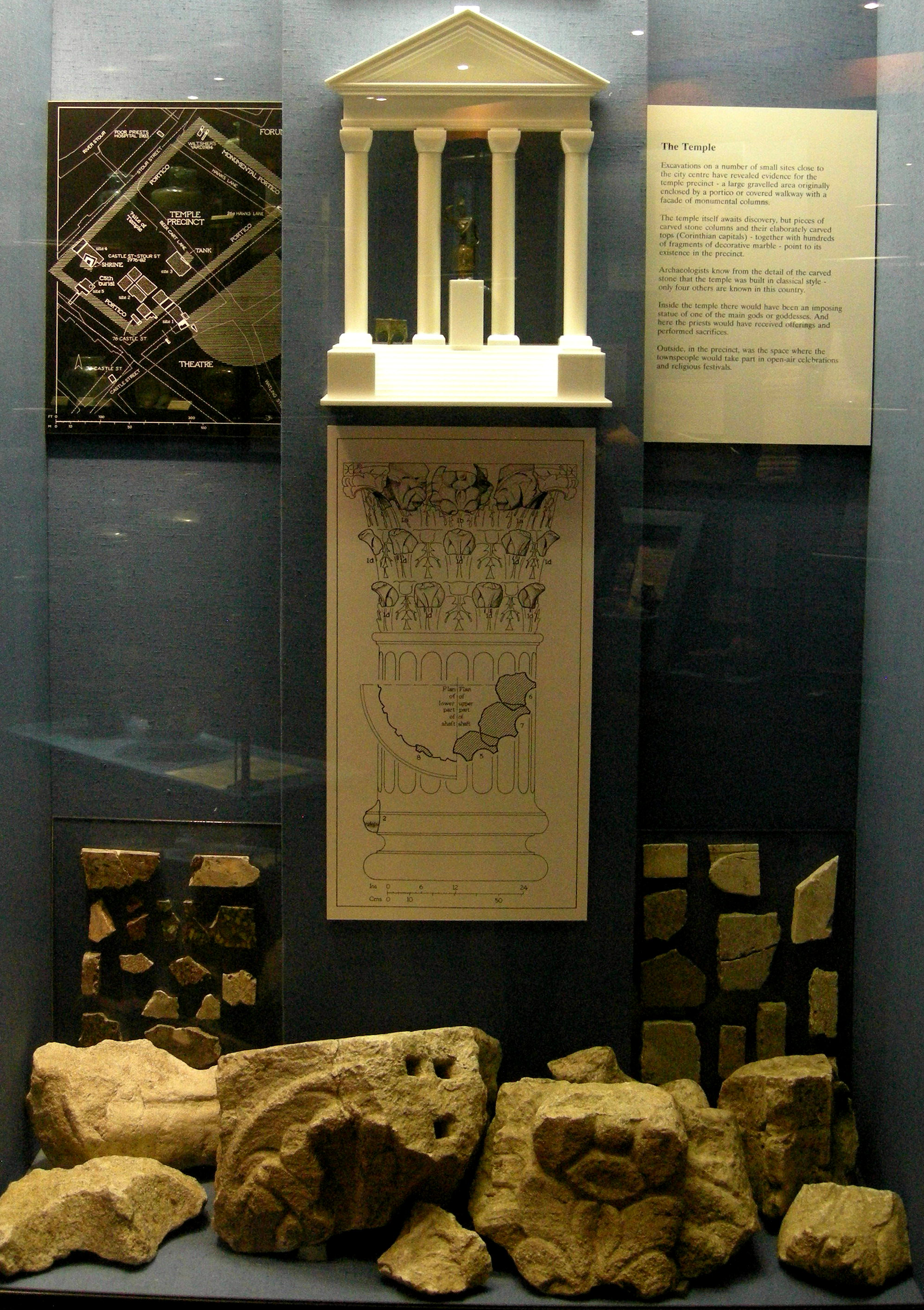
Display showing temple pieces from Long Market site

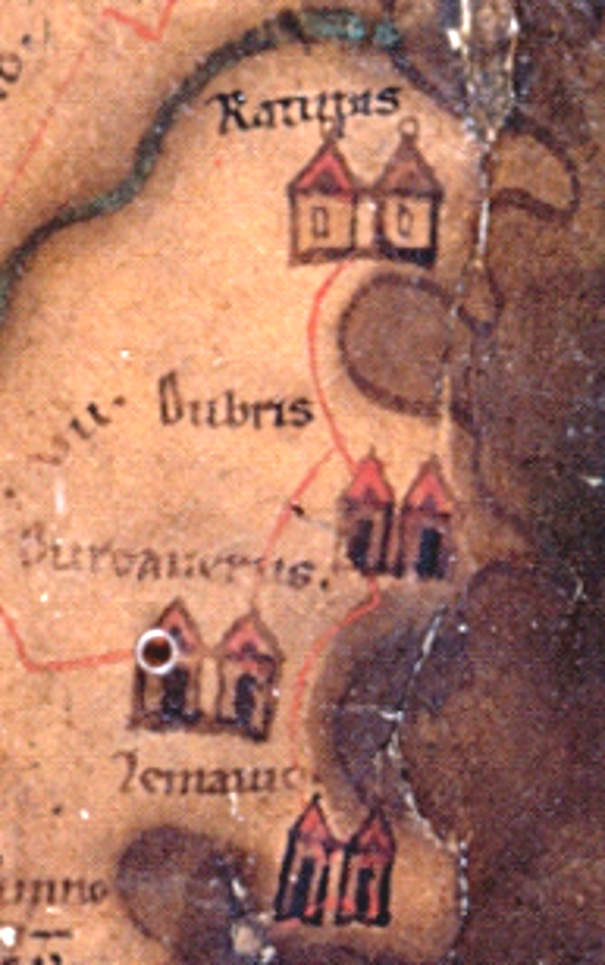
Roman Canterbury on the Peutinger Map

== Rediscovery of Roman Canterbury ==
Sheppard Frere undertook excavations in Canterbury from 1949 to 1955 and 1980–1984.
