= Lucy Harwood =

British artist

Eva Lucy Harwood
- Born: 1 January 1893; Belstead, Ipswich
- Died: 24 October 1972 (aged 79); Upper Layham, Suffolk
- Education: Slade School of Fine Art; East Anglian School of Printing and Drawing
- Known for: Painting

Eva Lucy Harwood (1 January 1893 – 24 October 1972) was a British artist known for her landscape paintings of East Anglia and Suffolk.

== Biography ==
Harwood was born at Belstead near Ipswich and moved with her family to East Bergholt while still a young child. A botched medical operation left Harwood partially paralysed on her right-hand side and ended her ambition to be a professional pianist. Turning to art, rather than music, Harwood enrolled in the Slade School of Fine Art in London prior to the start of World War I. In 1937 she studied at the East Anglian School of Printing and Drawing in Dedham run by Cedric Morris. Harwood remained with the School when it re-located to Benton End at Hadleigh in 1940 and was associated with the School in various roles for many years.

Working with her left hand only, Harwood created still-life and landscape paintings of Suffolk, in particular of the area around her home at Upper Layham but also of other parts of Britain and abroad. Harwood generally painted with a vivid, colour palette and described herself as a Post-Impressionist. A retrospective exhibition of her work was held at The Minories art centre in Colchester in 1975 and further shows followed at Sally Hunter Fine Art. Both the Ipswich Museum and the Colchester Art Society hold examples of her work.
