= Anne Askew =

English Protestant martyr (1521–1546)

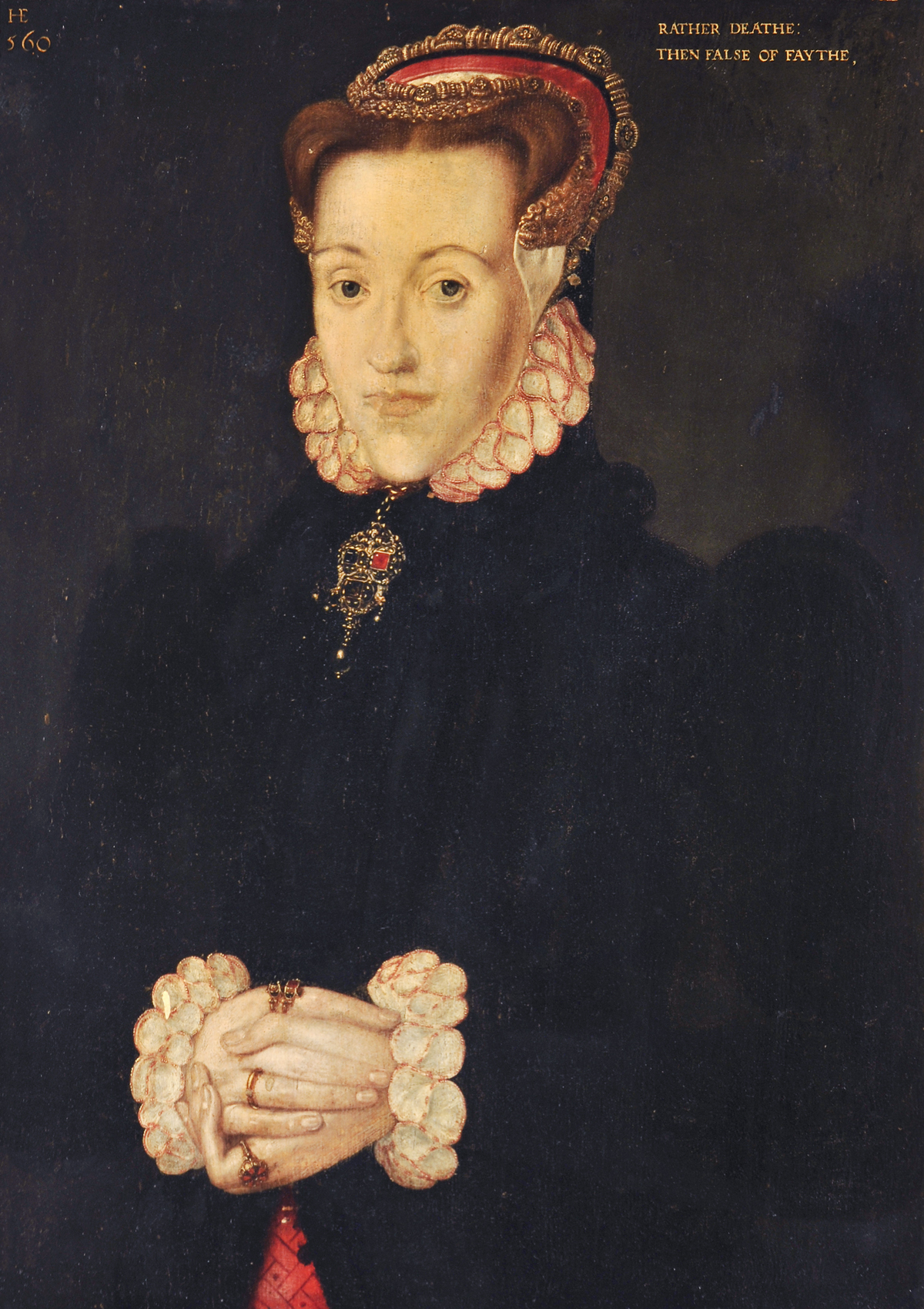
1560 portrait by Hans Eworth

Anne Askew (sometimes spelled Ayscough or Ascue), married name Anne Kyme (1521 – 16 July 1546), was an English writer, poet, and Protestant preacher who was condemned as a heretic during the reign of Henry VIII. She and Margaret Cheyne are the only women on record to have been both tortured in the Tower of London and burnt at the stake. She is also one of the earliest known female poets to compose in the English language.

== Biography ==
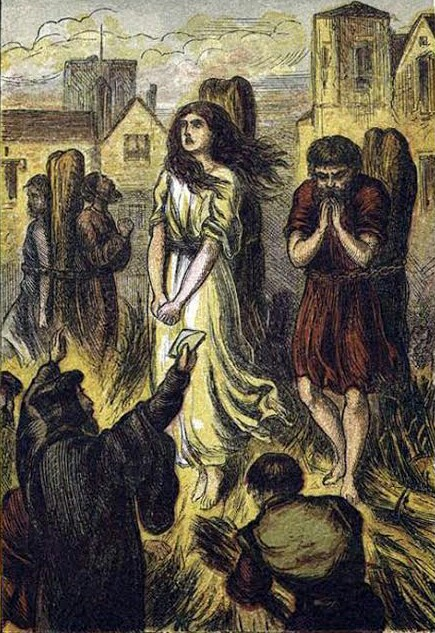
Martyrdom of Anne Askew

Anne Askew was born in 1521 in South Kelsey, Lincolnshire, England, to Sir William Askew, a wealthy landowner, and Elizabeth Wrottesley of Reading, Berkshire. Her father was a gentleman in the court of King Henry VIII, and served as a juror in the trial of Anne Boleyn's co-accused. Anne Askew was the fourth of the couple's five children; her brothers were Francis and Edward, and her sisters were Martha and Jane. She also had two younger half-brothers, Christopher and Thomas, by her father's second wife Elizabeth Hutton. The Askews were related to the lawyer and political leader Robert Aske, who led the Pilgrimage of Grace.

Sir William had arranged a marriage between his eldest daughter and one Thomas Kyme. Before the marriage occurred, Martha died, and Sir William decided that in order to save money he would have Anne, who was 15 years old at the time, take her sister's place and marry Thomas.

Anne was a devout Protestant throughout her life, her reading having convinced her that transubstantiation was a false idea. Her pronouncements caused controversy in Lincoln. Her husband was a Catholic, and neither he nor her brother Francis approved of the need she felt to spread her Protestant beliefs. Anne had two children with Kyme before he threw her out for being Protestant. It is alleged that Anne was seeking to divorce Kyme, so this did not upset her.

Anne moved to London, where she met other Protestants, including the Anabaptist Joan Bocher, and studied the Bible. During her marriage, Anne had taken Kyme's name. After their divorce, she reverted to her maiden name. While in London, she continued as a preacher.

In March 1545, Kyme had Askew arrested. She was brought back to Lincolnshire, where he ordered that she stay. She escaped and returned to London to continue preaching. In early 1546, she was arrested again but then released. In May 1546, she was arrested for the third time, and tortured in the Tower of London, the only woman to have been tortured there, aside from Margaret Cheyne. She was ordered to name like-minded women but refused. The torturers, Lord Chancellor Thomas Wriothesley and Sir Richard Rich, used the rack, but Askew refused to renounce her beliefs. On 18 June 1546, she was convicted of heresy, and was condemned to be burned at the stake.

On 16 July 1546, Askew was martyred in Smithfield, London. Due to the torture she had endured, she had to be carried to the stake on a chair. She was burned to death along with three others: John Lassells, Nicholas Belenian, also known as John Hemsley, and John Adams.

== Context for arrest ==
In the last year of Henry VIII's reign, Askew was caught up in a court struggle between religious traditionalists and reformers. Stephen Gardiner advised the king that diplomacy—the prospect of an alliance with the Roman Catholic Emperor Charles V—required a halt to religious reform. The traditionalist party pursued tactics tried out three years previously with the arrests of minor evangelicals in the hope that they would implicate those who were more highly placed. In this case measures were taken that were "legally bizarre and clearly desperate". The people rounded up were in many cases strongly linked to Thomas Cranmer, Archbishop of Canterbury, who spent most of the period absent from court in Kent: Askew's brother Edward was one of his servants and Nicholas Shaxton (who was brought in to put pressure on Askew to recant) was acting as a curate for Cranmer at Hadleigh. Others in Cranmer's circle who were arrested were Rowland Taylor and Richard Turner.

The traditionalist party included Thomas Wriothesley and Richard Rich (who racked Askew in the Tower), Edmund Bonner and Thomas Howard. The intention of her interrogators may have been to implicate Queen Katherine Parr through her ladies-in-waiting and close friends, who were suspected of having harboured Protestant beliefs. These ladies included Katherine Willoughby, Anne Calthorpe, Joan Champernowne, Lady Hertford and the Queen's sister, Anne Parr, and the Queen's first cousin Maud Parr, Lady Lane.

== Plain speaking ==
The prevailing religious culture of Anne's time, summed up by bishop Stephen Gardiner, viewed "plain speaking" with suspicion, a tactic used by the devil to spread heresy: "and where planes may deceive, he make then his pretence to speak plainly and professes simplicities". The inquisitors saw in Anne a particularly threatening example of such plain speaking, her agile answers demonstrating a mastery of scriptural language that rivalled the inquisitors' own. Under questioning from the bishop Edmund Bonner, who commanded her repeatedly to "utter al thynges that burdened [her] conscience", she answered in unembellished language blended with Scriptural teachings: "God hath given me the gifts of knowledge, but not of utterance. And Salomon sayth, that a woman of few words, is a gift of God (Sirach 26:14)."

Her answers infuriated the inquisitors, who found they were not able to force from her the answers they wanted to hear. Faced with Bonner's deepening rage, she repeated only that she believed "as the scripture doth teach", making it clear that she would not accept non-scriptural authorities over her own engagement with the Scriptures – which she quotes from directly – "That God dwelleth not in temples made with hands" (Acts 17:24). When Christopher Dare asked for her interpretation of this saying she mocked them, invoking the Sermon on the Mount: "I answered, that I would not throw pearls among swine, for acorns were good enough" (Matthew 7:6).

When questioned about the Eucharist she answered, "If the host should fall and a beast did eat it [did the] beast ... receive God or no?" She often played upon traditional gender roles to mock her questioners, telling them "it is agaynst saynt Paules lernynge, that [she] being a woman, should interpret the scriptures, specially where so many wise men were."

Of particular interest to the questioners was Anne's relationship with the Holy Spirit. Asked if she acted with the Holy Spirit inside her, she answered "if I had not, I was but a reprobate or cast awaye." Anabaptists were especially feared because they claimed the authority of the Holy Spirit and rejected other laws (like the Münster rebellion which declared the establishment of a "kingdom of a thousand years").

== Arrest and interrogation ==
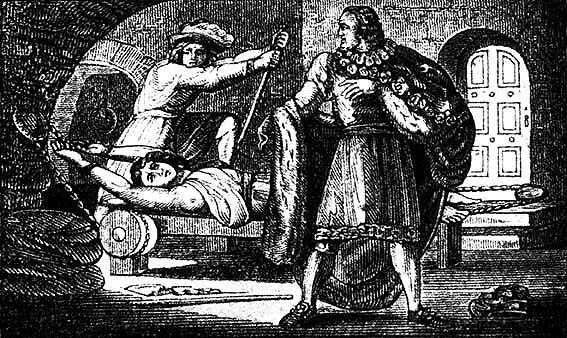
Torture of Anne Askew in the Tower of London

Anne Askew underwent two "examinations" before her execution. On 10 March 1545 the aldermen of London ordered for her to be detained under the Six Articles Act. Askew stood trial before the "quest", which was an official heresy hearing commission. She was then cross examined by the chancellor of the Bishop of London, Edmund Bonner. He ordered that she be imprisoned for 12 days. During this time she refused to make any sort of confession. Her cousin Brittany was finally allowed to visit her after the 12 days to pay her bail.

On 19 June 1546 Askew was again imprisoned and then subjected to a two-day-long cross examination, led by Chancellor Sir Thomas Wriothesley, Stephen Gardiner (The Bishop of Winchester), John Dudley, and Sir William Paget (the king's principal secretary). They threatened her with execution, but she still refused to confess or to name fellow Protestants. She was then ordered to be tortured. Her torturers did so, probably motivated by the desire for Askew to admit that Queen Katherine was also a practising Protestant.

According to her own account and that of jailers within the Tower, she was tortured only once. She was taken from her cell, at about ten o'clock in the morning, to the lower room of the White Tower. She was shown the rack and asked if she would name those who believed as she did. Askew declined to name anyone at all, so she was asked to remove all her clothing except her shift. Askew then climbed onto the rack, and her wrists and ankles were fastened. Again, she was asked for names, but she would say nothing. The wheel of the rack was turned, pulling Askew along the device and lifting her so that she was held taut about 5 inches above its bed and slowly stretched. In her own account written from prison, Askew said she fainted from pain and was lowered and revived. This procedure was repeated twice. Anthony Knyvett, then Lieutenant of the Tower, refused to carry on torturing her, left the tower, and sought a meeting with the king at his earliest convenience to explain his position and also to seek his pardon, which the king granted.

Wriothesley and Rich set to work themselves. They turned the handles so hard that Anne was drawn apart; her shoulders and hips were pulled from their sockets and her elbows and knees were dislocated. Askew's cries could be heard in the garden next to the White Tower where the Lieutenant's wife and daughter were walking. Askew gave no names and her ordeal ended when the Lieutenant ordered her to be returned to her cell.

== Execution ==
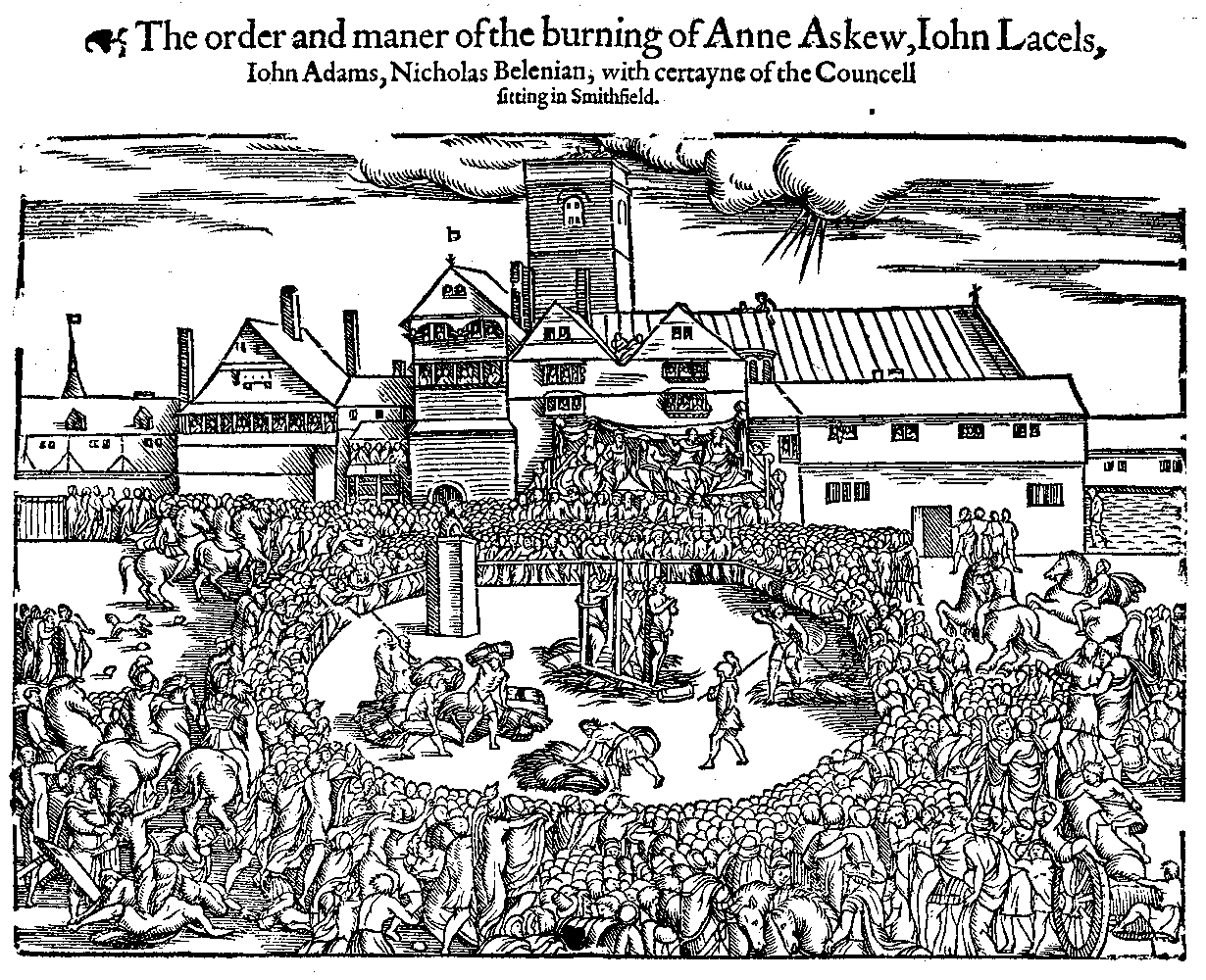
Woodcut of the burning of Anne Askew, for heresy, at Smithfield in London in 1546

Anne Askew was burnt at the stake at Smithfield, London, aged 25, on 16 July 1546, with John Lascelles, Nicholas Belenian and John Adams. She was carried to execution in a chair wearing just her shift, as she could not walk and every movement caused her severe pain. She was dragged from the chair to the stake and fastened upright to the stake by a chain around her middle. Foxe reports that of the four martyrs burned together that day at three stakes, at least some had gunpowder tied around their bodies to speed up death.

Prior to their death, the prisoners were offered one last chance at pardon. Bishop Shaxton mounted the pulpit and began to preach to them. Askew listened attentively throughout his discourse. When he spoke anything she considered to be the truth, she audibly expressed agreement; but when he said anything contrary to what she believed scripture stated, she exclaimed: "There he misseth, and speaketh without the book."

== Legacy ==
Askew wrote a first-person account of her ordeal and her beliefs, which was published first as The Examinations by John Bale, and later in John Foxe's Acts and Monuments of 1563, which proclaimed her as a Protestant martyr. Both of these publications surround Askew's writing with partisan commentary. Analysis has suggested that Bale added and deleted parts of Askew's text to position her as a "weak vessel of the Lord", rather than an independent woman and scholar. Foxe removed Bale's notes to Askew's text, but then added his own along with uncited new information and edits to the language.

While Bale is criticised and Foxe is often commended for doing a better job with capturing her narrative, it is important to point out the accuracy issues of the two texts principally responsible for Askew's legacy.

When Askew was writing her accounts of her arrests and trial, she used strategies that men, such as John Lascalles, were using at the time. She remained silent and did not give up her allies. Although men were doing this at the same time, Askew was highly criticized for doing so and was portrayed as a weak woman. Bale also saw this as a chance to add his thoughts and comments to her published writing to make it more legitimate in the eyes of the people.

== Examinations ==
Anne Askew's autobiographical and published Examinations chronicle her persecution and offer a unique look into 16th-century femininity, religion, and faith. Her writing is unusual because it deviates completely from what is expected from "Tudor women or, more specifically, Tudor women martyrs". It depicts her confrontations with male authority figures of the time who challenged aspects of life: from her progressive divorce, which she initiated, to her religious beliefs, which set her apart in England as a devout Protestant woman. Her ability to avoid indictment in 1545 points to what Paula McQuade calls Askew's "real brilliance", showing "her being familiar enough with English law to attempt to use the system to her benefit". While her Examinations are a rare record of her experiences as a woman in Tudor England, they also show her position as an educated woman. Not only was she able to write of her experiences, she was also able to correspond with learned men of the time, such as John Lascelles and Dr. Edward Crome who were also arrested for heresy. As stated above, Askew's Examinations are imperfect and were altered by John Bale and John Foxe, but read as they were originally intended, Anne Askew's writing is an important autobiographical account of 16th-century religious turmoil.

== Works ==
- 1546 – John Bale (Hrsg.): The First Examinacyon of the worthye servaunt of god Mastres Anne Askewe, latelye martyred in Smythfelde, by the Romysh popes vpholders, with the Elucydacyon of Johan Bale
- 1547 – John Bale (Hrsg.): The lattre examinacyon of the worthye servaunt of God mastres Anne Askewe, lately martyred in Smythfelde, by the wycked Synagoge of Antichrist, with the Elucydacyon of Johan Bale
- 1670 – Anne askew, intituled, I am a vvoman, poor and blind
- 1866 – Anne Manning. Passages in the Life of the Faire Gospeller, Mistress Anne Askew

== Representations in popular culture ==
- In the television series The Six Wives of Henry VIII Anne was played by Elizabeth Bell.
- In the television series The Tudors Anne was played by Welsh actress Emma Stansfield.
- In the 2023 historical drama film Firebrand Anne was portrayed by Erin Doherty. Her execution takes place off-screen.

== See also ==
- List of The Tudors episodes
