= John Capon =

Benedictine monk and Bishop of Bangor

John Capon, (alias John Salcot) (died 1557) was a Benedictine monk who became bishop of Bangor, then bishop of Salisbury under Henry VIII. He is often referred to as John Salcot alias Capon (variously spelt).

== Background ==
He graduated B.A. from the University of Cambridge, in 1488. He became prior of St John's Abbey, Colchester, and then abbot of St Benet's Hulme, in Norfolk. He was a vocal supporter of Henry's divorce from Catherine of Aragon.

He was abbot of Hyde Abbey from 1530, and bishop of Bangor from 1533 (without papal approval); he was consecrated a bishop on 19 April 1534, by Thomas Cranmer, Archbishop of Canterbury, assisted by John Longland, Bishop of Lincoln; and Christopher Lord, suffragan bishop of Canterbury and Bishop of Sidon. It is believed that he never took up residence at Bangor, and he admitted that he found it a problem that he did not speak Welsh. He was translated to become bishop of Salisbury in 1539.

Under Mary I of England he was one of the commissioners involved in the trials of Protestants and condemned John Bradford, Laurence Saunders and Rowland Taylor to death.

During John Capon's period as bishop of Salisbury the town and country witnessed some of its bloodiest years in its persecution of Protestants. The versatile, feared and unscrupulous Capon was Bishop at the time of the reign of Henry VIII and held it during the period of the protectorate, the reign of Edward VI, and Mary I. As the king's commissioner he sent several to the stake in the days of Henry VIII. Under Edward VI he became a Protestant; and, changing once more to Catholic under Mary, sat as a judge at the trial of Bishop Hooper and John Rogers. He saw the fall of Thomas Cromwell, and the confiscation of chantries and colleges. During the more than twenty years of his episcopate he saw many people put to death for heresy, denying the king's supremacy, or on other pretences; among the more notable victims were Archbishop Cranmer, and Bishops Ridley and Latimer.

It was not long before the effects of Mary's reign were felt in Salisbury. The use of the 1552 Prayer Book was forbidden by the end of 1553, altars were restored, and the Mass was again said. On 24 July 1554 Queen Mary married Philip of Spain and within six months the first martyrs were burning. One of the Commission of Bishops appointed to persecute Protestants was the Bishop of Salisbury, John Capon. Having sent numerous well-known Protestants to the stake elsewhere in England, Capon did not hesitate to do the same to men of humble rank in his own Salisbury diocese. On 24 March 1556, three days after Archbishop Cranmer was burned, three men were burned at the stake in Salisbury. Their names were John Maundrell (a farmer), William Coberly (a tailor), and John Spicer (a stonemason).

John Capon was a brother of William Capon, a former Master of Jesus College, Cambridge, whose bequest of £100 was instrumental in the founding of King Edward VI School, Southampton.

== Bibliography ==
- Concise Dictionary of National Biography. "under Capon, John"
- Louisa, Angelo J. (2004). Capon [Salcot], John (d. 1557), bishop of Salisbury. Oxford Dictionary of Biography. Oxford University Press.
- Magee, John; Magee, Angela. John Foxe 1517 - 1587 (PDF). Archived from the original (PDF) on 2 April 2015.

Church of England titles
Preceded by Thomas Skevington	Bishop of Bangor; 1534–1539	Succeeded by John Bird
Preceded by Nicholas Shaxton	Bishop of Salisbury; 1539–1557	Succeeded by William Petow
