= Thomas D'Oyly (disambiguation) =

Thomas D'Oyly (fl. 1585) was an English antiquary.

Thomas D'Oyly may also refer to:

- Thomas D'Oyly (priest), Archdeacon of Lewes, 1751–1770
- Sir Thomas D'Oyly, 3rd Baronet (c. 1701–1759), of the D'Oyly baronets

== See also ==
- Thomas D'Oyly Snow (1858–1940), British general
