= Listed buildings in Layham =

Civil Parish in Suffolk, England

Layham is a village and civil parish in the Babergh District of Suffolk, England. It contains 23 grade II listed buildings that are recorded in the National Heritage List for England.

This list is based on the information retrieved online from Historic England.

== Key ==
Grade	Criteria
I	Buildings that are of exceptional interest
II*	Particularly important buildings of more than special interest
II	Buildings that are of special interest

== Listing ==
Name	Grade	Location	Type	Completed (Note: The date given is the date used by Historic England as significant for the initial building or that of an important part in the structure's description.)	Date designated	Grid ref. (Note: The grid reference is based on the British national grid reference system, sometimes known as OSGB36, used by the Ordnance Survey.) Geo-coordinates	Notes	Entry number (Note: The "List Entry Number" is a unique number assigned to each listed building and scheduled monument by Historic England.)	Image	Wikidata
Church of St Andrew	II	Church Lane	church building		23 January 1958	TM0306540311; 52°01′27″N 0°57′30″E		1037136	Church of St Andrew More images	Q26288831
Mill House, Layham Mill	II	Layham Mill, Mill Lane			10 July 1980	TM0333940448; 52°01′31″N 0°57′45″E		1037137	Upload Photo	Q26288832
Layham Park	II	Long Road			10 July 1980	TM0243640930; 52°01′47″N 0°56′58″E		1181413	Upload Photo	Q26476734
Layham War Memorial	II	Lower Street, IP7 5LZ			9 March 2020	TM0301140300; 52°01′26″N 0°57′27″E		1468467	Upload Photo	Q97452240
Layham Watermill	II	Mill Lane			24 January 1979	TM0331140462; 52°01′31″N 0°57′43″E		1037138	Upload Photo	Q26288833
Overbury Hall	II	Overbury Hall Road			23 January 1958	TM0220540318; 52°01′28″N 0°56′45″E		1181812	Upload Photo	Q26477107
Popes Green Farmhouse	II	Popes Green Lane			10 July 1980	TM0061039752; 52°01′12″N 0°55′20″E		1037139	Upload Photo	Q26288835
Deaves Farmhouse	II	Potts Lane			10 July 1980	TM0086241524; 52°02′09″N 0°55′37″E		1037140	Upload Photo	Q26288836
Holbecks	II	Potts Lane			23 January 1958	TM0197341789; 52°02′16″N 0°56′36″E		1181816	Upload Photo	Q26477110
Potts Cottage	II	Potts Lane			10 July 1980	TM0020241173; 52°01′58″N 0°55′02″E		1181820	Upload Photo	Q26477114
Lots Farmhouse	II	Rands Road			10 July 1980	TM0183040068; 52°01′20″N 0°56′25″E		1037141	Upload Photo	Q26288837
Rand's Farmhouse	II	Rands Road			10 July 1980	TM0113640703; 52°01′42″N 0°55′50″E		1037142	Upload Photo	Q26288838
Valley Farmhouse	II	Rands Road			10 July 1980	TM0161540316; 52°01′29″N 0°56′14″E		1284842	Upload Photo	Q26573581
Stoke Road Cottage	II	Stoke Road			10 July 1980	TM0251139553; 52°01′03″N 0°56′59″E		1351552	Upload Photo	Q26634642
Layham House	II	The Street			23 January 1958	TM0289440161; 52°01′22″N 0°57′21″E		1284805	Upload Photo	Q26573546
Layham House Cottage	II	The Street			10 July 1980	TM0292840173; 52°01′22″N 0°57′23″E		1037143	Upload Photo	Q26288839
Netherbury Hall	II	The Street			23 January 1958	TM0302940226; 52°01′24″N 0°57′28″E		1181837	Upload Photo	Q26477127
The Dower House	II	The Street			10 July 1980	TM0294240157; 52°01′22″N 0°57′23″E		1351553	Upload Photo	Q26634643
The Queen's Head Inn	II	The Street	inn		23 January 1958	TM0294340188; 52°01′23″N 0°57′23″E		1181827	The Queen's Head Inn More images	Q26477120
Cottage Adjoining Marquis Cornwallis Inn	II	Upper Street			10 July 1980	TM0382040357; 52°01′27″N 0°58′10″E		1181839	Upload Photo	Q26477129
Marquis Cornwallis Inn	II	Upper Street	hotel		10 July 1980	TM0382140344; 52°01′27″N 0°58′10″E		1037144	Marquis Cornwallis Inn More images	Q26288840
The Cottage	II	Upper Street			10 July 1980	TM0360240509; 52°01′32″N 0°57′59″E		1037145	Upload Photo	Q26288841
Uplands House	II	Upper Street			14 October 1992	TM0368840491; 52°01′32″N 0°58′03″E		1351594	Upload Photo	Q26634682

== See also ==
- Grade I listed buildings in Suffolk
- Grade II* listed buildings in Suffolk

== Sources ==
- Bettely, James; Pevsner, Nikolaus (2015) [1961], Suffolk: West, The Buildings of England, New Haven and London: Yale University Press, ISBN 978-0-300-19655-9
