= Hadleigh Town Hall =

Municipal building in Southwold, Suffolk, England

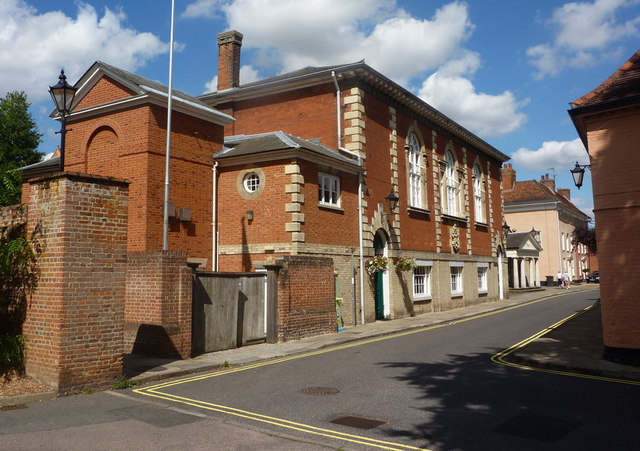
- Hadleigh Town Hall

- Shown in Suffolk
- 52.0429°N 0.9529°E
- Location: Market Place, Hadleigh

History
- Built: 1851

Site notes
- Architect: William Parkes Ribbans
- Architectural style: Italianate style

Listed Building – Grade II
- Official name: Town Hall
- Designated: 22 May 1972
- Reference no.: 1194514

Hadleigh Town Hall, also referred to as the New Town Hall, is a municipal building in the Market Place in Hadleigh, Suffolk, England. The building, which is the meeting place of Hadleigh Town Council, is a Grade II listed building.

== History ==
The first municipal building in the town was an ancient timber framed market hall which was re-built in around 1438. The market hall was complemented by guild halls, which were commissioned by the local guilds and completed in the late-15th century. After the dissolution of the monasteries in 1536, the guild halls were seized by the crown, sold into private ownership and used for public events: this part of the complex eventually became known as the "Old Town Hall". (Note: Following completion of the New Town Hall the Old Town Hall became a school and was later used as a corset factory.)

In the mid-19th century, civic leaders decided to commission a more substantial municipal building and the southern end of the guild hall structure was demolished to make way for the new building. Funding for the new structure was raised by public subscription. It was designed by William Parkes Ribbans of Ipswich, built in buff brick (for the ground floor) and red brick (for the first floor) with stone dressings at a cost of £840 and was opened as the "New Town Hall" in 1851.

The design involved a symmetrical main frontage with five bays facing onto the Market Place; the central bay was fenestrated by a casement window on the ground floor, and by a Venetian window with an architrave and a keystone on the first floor. The bays flanking the central bay were fenestrated by casement windows on the ground floor and by round headed windows with architraves and keystones on the first floor. The outer bays contained round headed doorways with voussoirs. The central and outer bays were enhanced by ashlar quoins, and the Hadleigh coat of arms, carved in stone, was erected below the Venetian window. At roof level, there was a modillioned cornice. Internally, the principal room in the New Town Hall was the Grand Hall on the first floor. The ground floor area contained space for the horse-drawn fire engine, a caretaker's flat and an office which was let to a local solicitor.

Following significant population growth, largely associated with the status of Hadleigh as a market town, the area became an urban district in 1894. The new council established its offices at Toppesfield Hall, a short distance to the south west of the New Town Hall. County court hearings were held in the Grand Hall in the 19th century and it continued to be used for civic events, balls and concerts into the 20th century.

Following local government re-organisation in 1974, the Grand Hall became the meeting place of Hadleigh Town Council. Meanwhile, the ground floor of the New Town Hall was fitted out as a dining room. Following completion of a major programme of refurbishment works, which included the installation of a stairlift, the New Town Hall was reopened by the Lord Lieutenant of Suffolk, Sir Joshua Rowley, 7th Baronet, in 1991.
