= Aldham, Suffolk =

Village in Suffolk, England

Coordinates: 52.06°N 00.97°E

Aldham
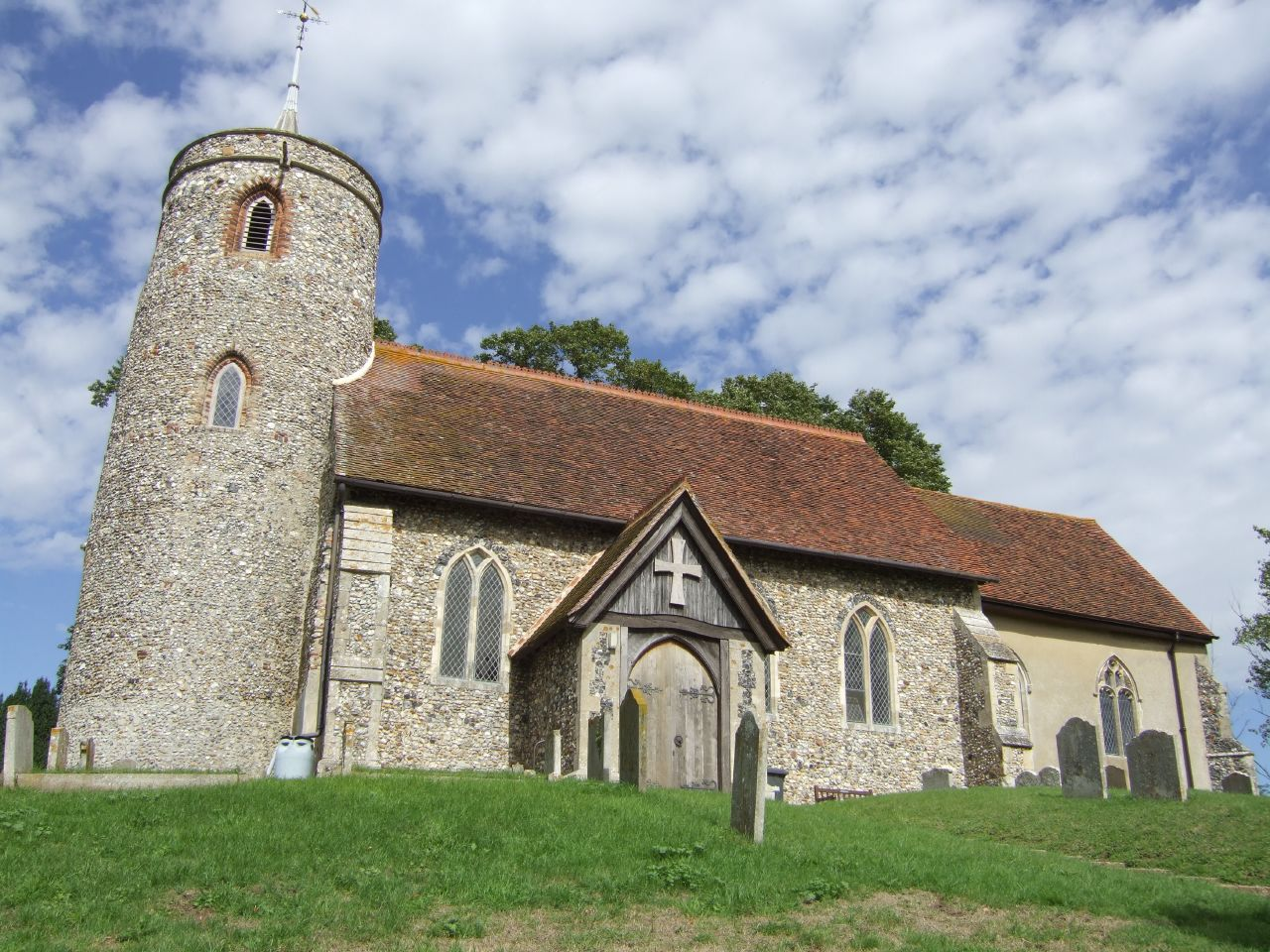
- St Mary's church

- Location within Suffolk
- Interactive map of Aldham
- Population: 190 (2022)
- OS grid reference: TM0445
- District: Babergh
- Shire county: Suffolk
- Region: East
- Country: England
- Sovereign state: United Kingdom
- Post town: Ipswich
- Postcode district: IP7
- Police: Suffolk
- Fire: Suffolk
- Ambulance: East of England

Aldham is a village and civil parish in the Babergh district of Suffolk, England. Located around 8 miles (13 km) west of Ipswich, in 2005 it had a population of 200, reducing to 175 at the 2011 Census.

== History ==
According to Eilert Ekwall the meaning of the village name is Ealda's meadow/enclosure or old meadow/enclosure. The village was mentioned in the Domesday Book of 1086, situated in the ancient hundred of Cosford, at which time it had a population of 16 households.

In 1555, Aldham Common was the location for the martyrdom of Dr Rowland Taylor, the rector of Hadleigh, during the Marian Persecutions of Protestants. An unhewn stone, probably dating from the early 17th century, marks the place of Taylor's death, located where the B1070 Lady Lane meets the A1071 Ipswich Road. Next to the stone is a pyramidal stone monument erected in 1818 and restored by parishioners in 1882. It is a Grade II listed building.

The church of Aldham St Mary is one of 38 existing round-tower churches in Suffolk. It appears in the second series of the BBC Four television series Detectorists.

== Demography ==
According to the Office for National Statistics, at the time of the United Kingdom Census 2001, Aldham had a population of 200, reducing to 175 at the 2011 Census.

=== Population change ===
Population growth in Aldham from 1801 to 1891
Year	1801	1811	1821	1831	1841	1851	1881	1891
Population	197	251	292	318	293	307	238	228
Source: A Vision of Britain Through Time

Population growth in Aldham from 1901 to 2001
Year	1901	1911	1921	1931	1951	1961	2001
Population	238	207	186	186	163	126	200
Source: A Vision of Britain Through Time

== Gallery ==
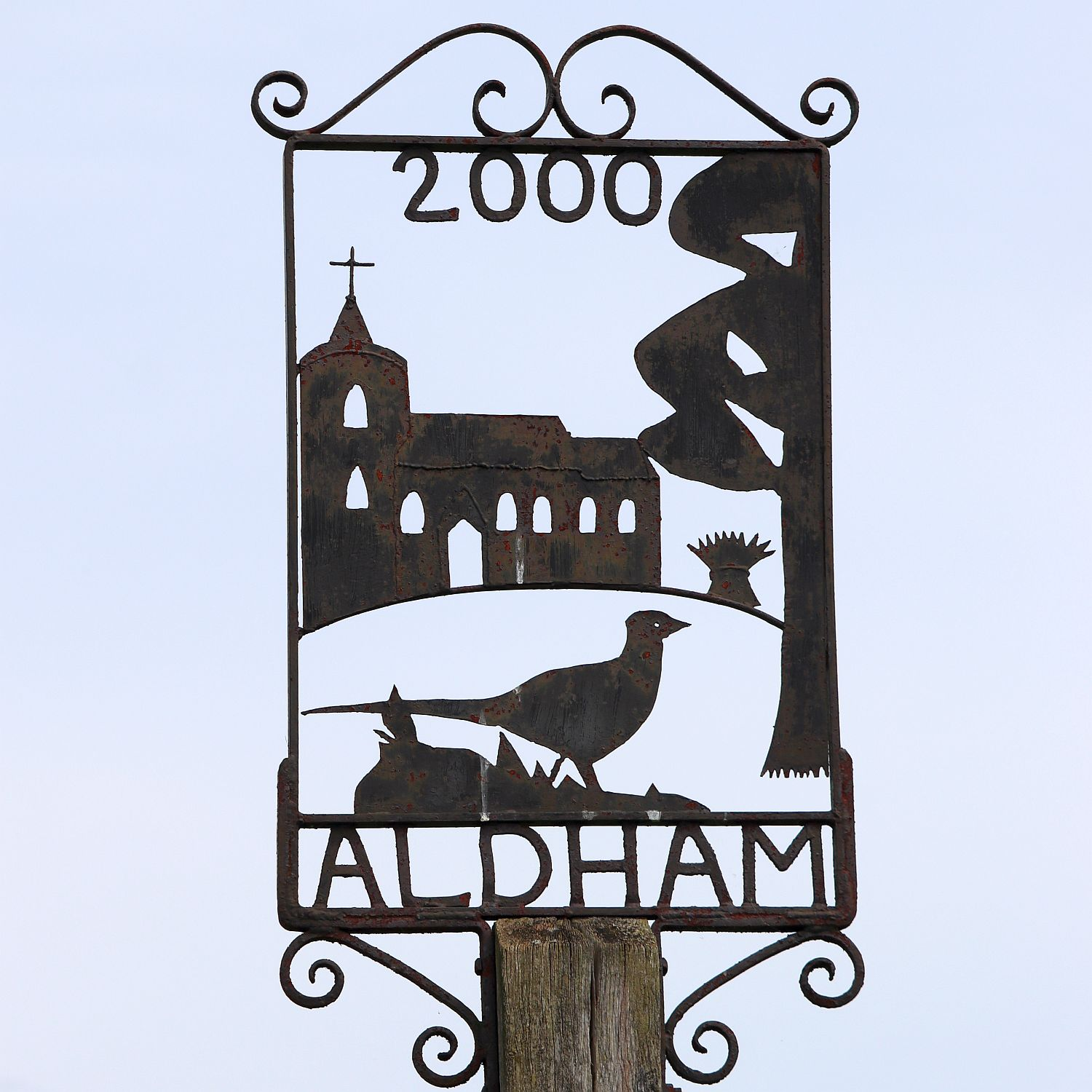
Aldham village sign

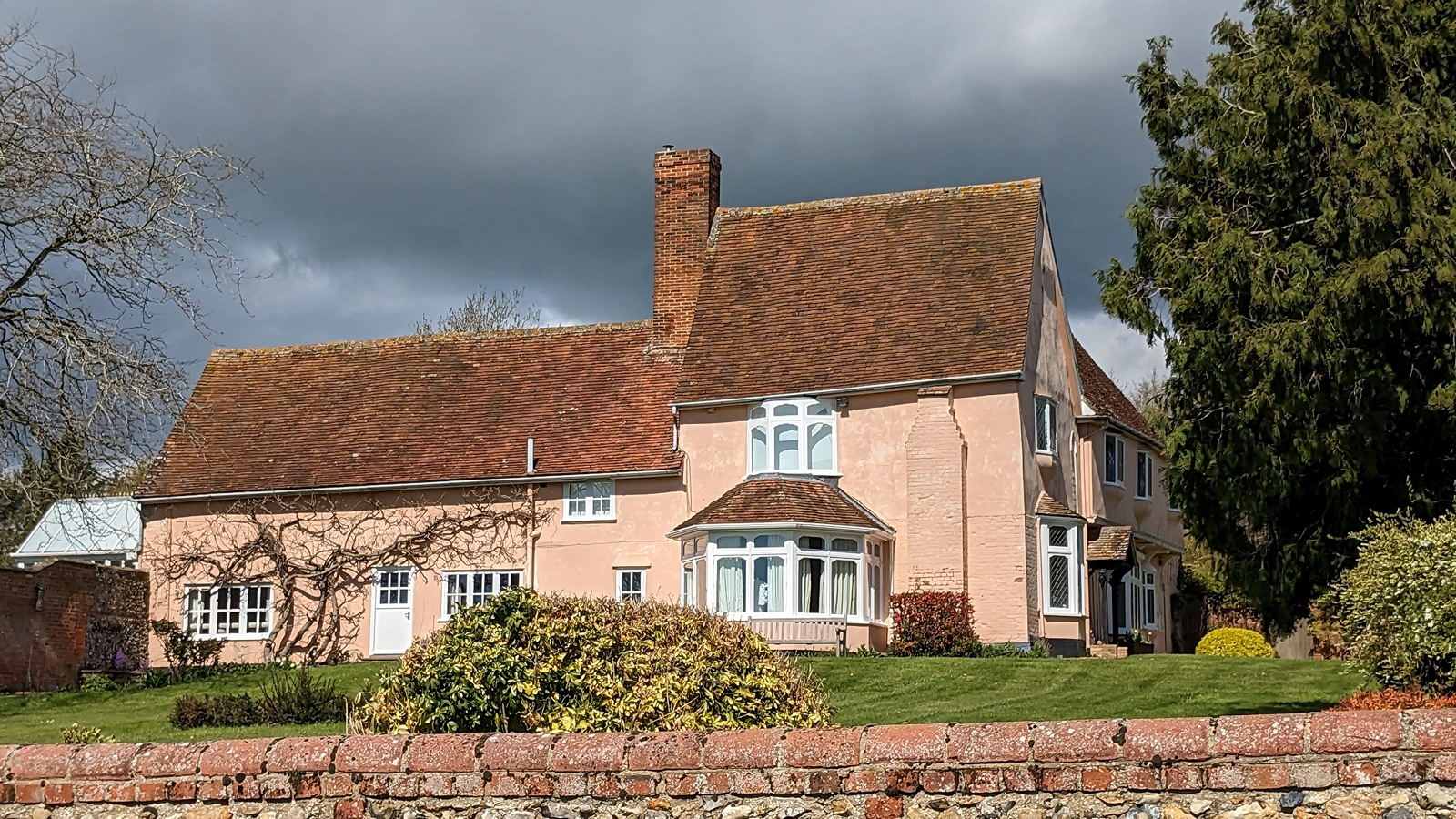
Aldham Hall

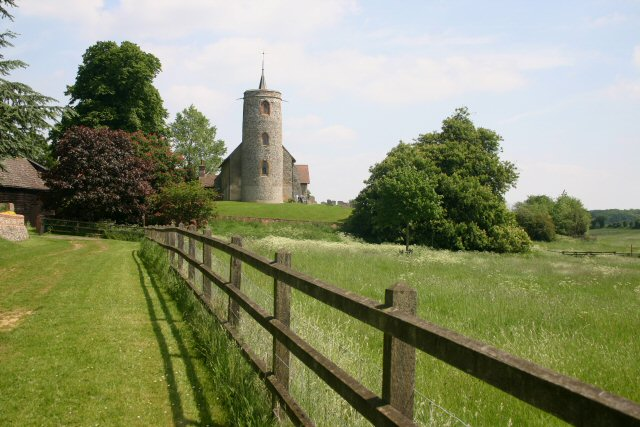
Tower of St Mary's Church

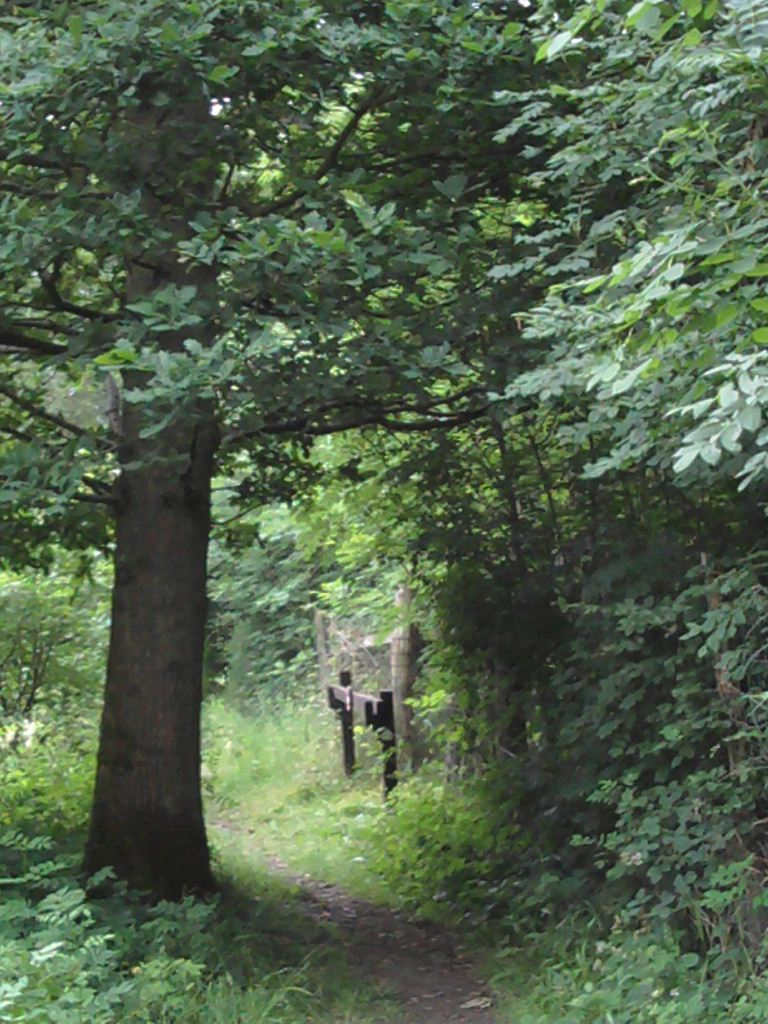
Woodland path, Wolves Wood RSPB Reserve
