= John Preston (rebel) =

English rebel (died 1381)

John Preston of Hadleigh in Suffolk, was a tenant of St Osyth's Abbey. He was executed for his involvement in the Peasants' Revolt.
On June 25, 1381, Preston delivered a written petition on behalf of the commons to a royal commission meeting in Chelmsford in Essex to punish insurgents:

We the commons beseech of the special grace of our Lord the King that no-one should pay annually for customary land more than 4d an acre or 2d for half an acre or a halfpenny for a rood, with or without buildings, for all services and demands, and also we beseech that if less was paid it should remain as it was before this time. We also beseech that no court should be held in any vill apart from the leet of the Lord King annually and for ever. And also we beseech that if any thief, traitor or malefactor against the peace be captured in any vill, that you will give us a law by which he will be chastised.

Arrested and questioned by the commissioners, Preston admitted to writing the petition and bringing it himself to their court. He was then executed.

What Preston hoped to accomplish by his act remains a question. After the death of Wat Tyler on June 15, the rising's momentum collapsed, the king and gentry were suppressing any resistance and prosecuting associated crimes. The news of Preston's death provoked further disturbance and a threat on the life of the Abbot of St Osyth.
