= Lower Layham =

Village in Suffolk, England

Coordinates: 52.023°N 0.956°E

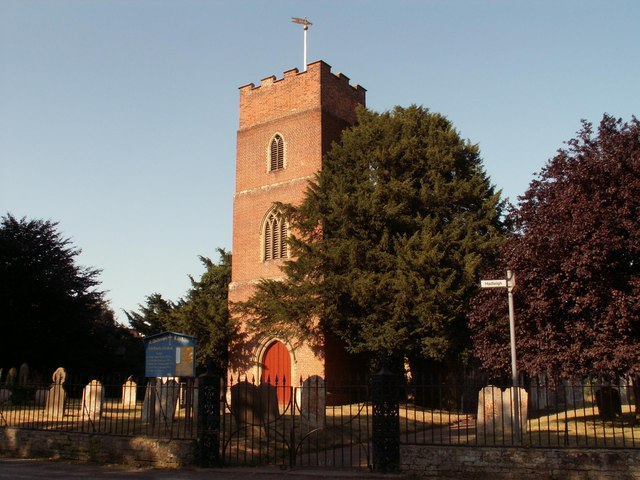
- St Andrew's

- Location within Suffolk
- Civil parish: Layham
- District: Babergh
- Shire county: Suffolk
- Region: East
- Country: England
- Sovereign state: United Kingdom
- Dialling code: 01473
- Police: Suffolk
- Fire: Suffolk
- Ambulance: East of England

Lower Layham is a village in the civil parish of Layham, in the Babergh district, in the county of Suffolk, England. The village contains St Andrew's Church (Layham parish church) and a pub, The Queen's Head. The village is separated from Upper Layham by the River Brett.
