= St Mary's Church, Hadleigh =

Coordinates: 52°02′37″N 0°57′11″E

St Mary, Hadleigh
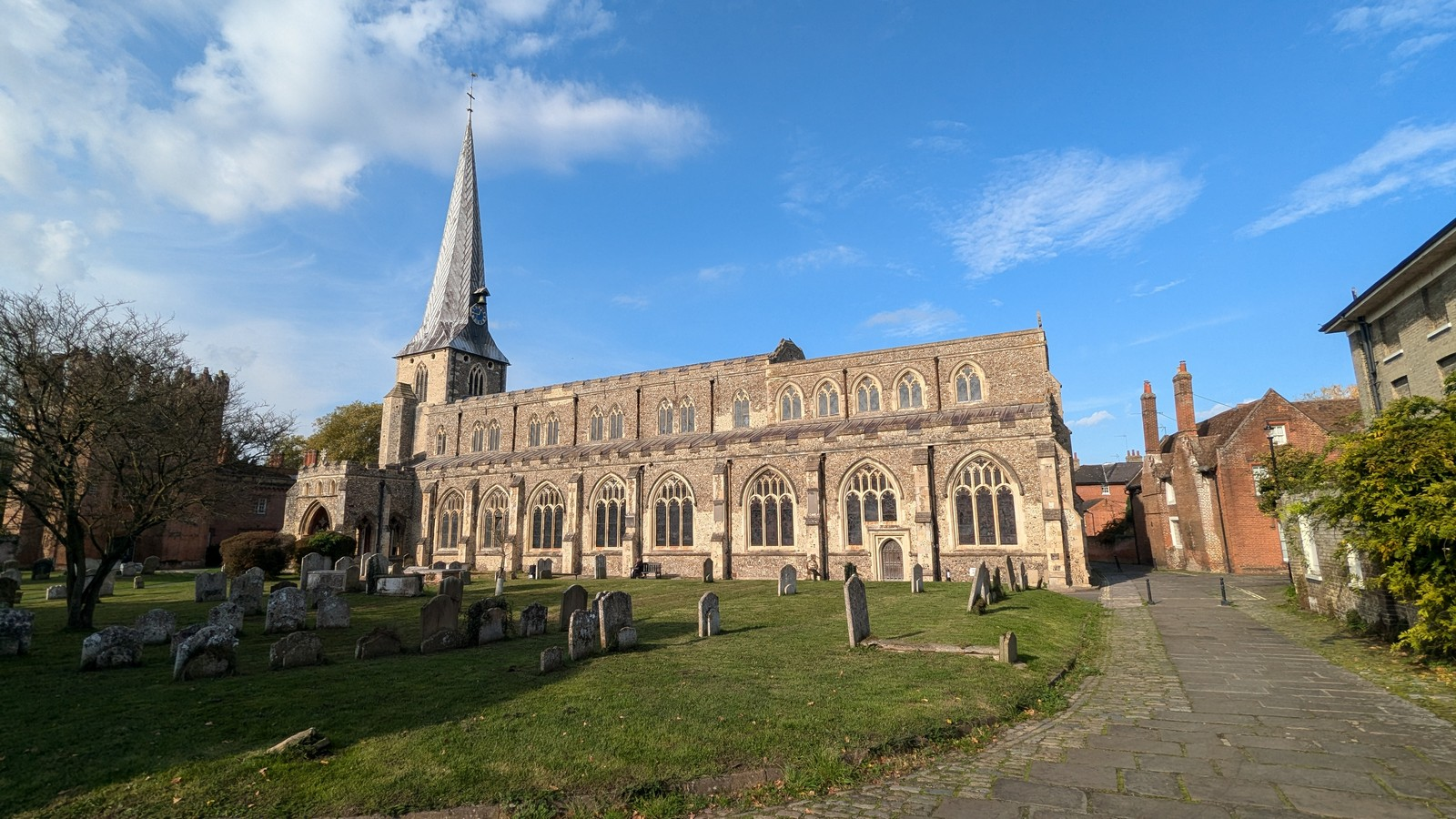
- St Mary's from the south, 2024

- Location in Suffolk
- Location: Hadleigh, Suffolk
- Country: England
- Denomination: Anglican
- Website: stmaryshadleigh.co.uk

History
- Status: Parish church
- Founded: c. 878–890
- Founder: Guthrum (reputed)
- Dedication: Saint Mary

Architecture
- Functional status: Active
- Heritage designation: Grade I
- Designated: 26 April 1950
- Architectural type: Norman
- Style: Perpendicular Gothic (mostly)

Specifications
- Length: 163 feet (50 m)
- Width: c.66 feet (20 m)
- Height: 135 feet (41 m) (top of spire)

Administration
- Province: Canterbury
- Diocese: St Edmundsbury and Ipswich
- Archdeaconry: Ipswich
- Deanery: Hadleigh
- Parish: Benefice of Hadleigh, Layham & Shelley

Clergy
- Rector: The Very Revd Jo Delfgou

St Mary's is an Anglican church in Hadleigh, Suffolk. It is an active parish church in the Diocese of St Edmundsbury and Ipswich and the archdeaconry of Ipswich. Its earliest parts date from medieval times; it is a Grade I listed building and is considered to be "a stunning wool church".

== History and architecture ==
The church is built of flint rubble with ashlar surrounds. It has 14th-century aisles, an aisled nave and chancel, a western tower, a two-storey south porch and a north vestry. It has been described as "a stunning wool church". In the first half of the 15th century, the wealth of the town arose from wool cloth and the church was one of the first wool churches to be rebuilt in that period.

The church has a leaded spire and roofs. The broach spire is 71 feet (22 m) tall, giving a total height of 135 feet (41 m). Described by Simon Jenkins as "bold", it is twisted, caused by warping of its timber framework. Dating from the early 14th century, it is probably the earliest surviving spire in the county. Its lead was last replaced in 1926.

In the 15th century all the windows were renewed, apart from those in the tower; additionally the arcades were rebuilt and the northeast vestry, south porch and clerestory were all added. The church received extensive restorations during both the 19th century and the early 20th century.

On 26 April 1950 the church was designated a Grade I listed building. Its listing by Historic England records the principal reasons for designation as its size, the quality of its late-medieval architecture and its interior.

== Setting ==
St Mary's churchyard is the site of the town's "most spectacular buildings". The church sits roughly at the centre, and the boundary is delineated by Church Walk. Directly opposite the church's west end stands Deanery Tower. Contemporaneous with the reconstruction of the church, the tower dates from the late 15th century and was built by William Pykenham, Archdeacon of Suffolk and rector at Hadleigh. (Note: Charles Tracy, in a paper on Pykenham prepared for the Suffolk Institute of Archaeology & History, suggests that an unidentified tomb in St Mary's may be Pykenham's own.) Pykenham intended the tower as a self-sufficient gatehouse to the parsonage which stood closer to the river. It is constructed in red brick. James Bettley and Nikolaus Pevsner, in their Suffolk: West volume in the Buildings of England series, draw parallels with the gatehouse at Oxburgh Hall. Deanery Tower is a Grade I listed building.

The Guildhall or Market Hall stands to the south of the church, across from the graveyard. A timber-framed building of two and three storeys, it dates from the middle of the 15th century. It also has a Grade I listing. The Deanery abuts Deanery Tower and dates from the early 19th century, although the style is Tudor in emulation of the tower. It is a Grade II* listed building.

The church is the subject of a painting by Sir Thomas Gainsborough produced in about 1748. Commissioned by the rector, Rev. Thomas Tanner, following renovations in the 1740s, it was painted on a large 6-foot (1.8 m) canvas by the young Gainsborough, with assistance from Joshua Kirby. The boys playing marbles on a tomb allude to a similar scene in Hogarth's Industry and Idleness which was published in 1747.

== Administration ==
St Mary's is an active parish church in the Diocese of St Edmundsbury and Ipswich and the archdeaconry of Ipswich. It is part of the benefice of Hadleigh, Layham & Shelley.

== Gallery ==
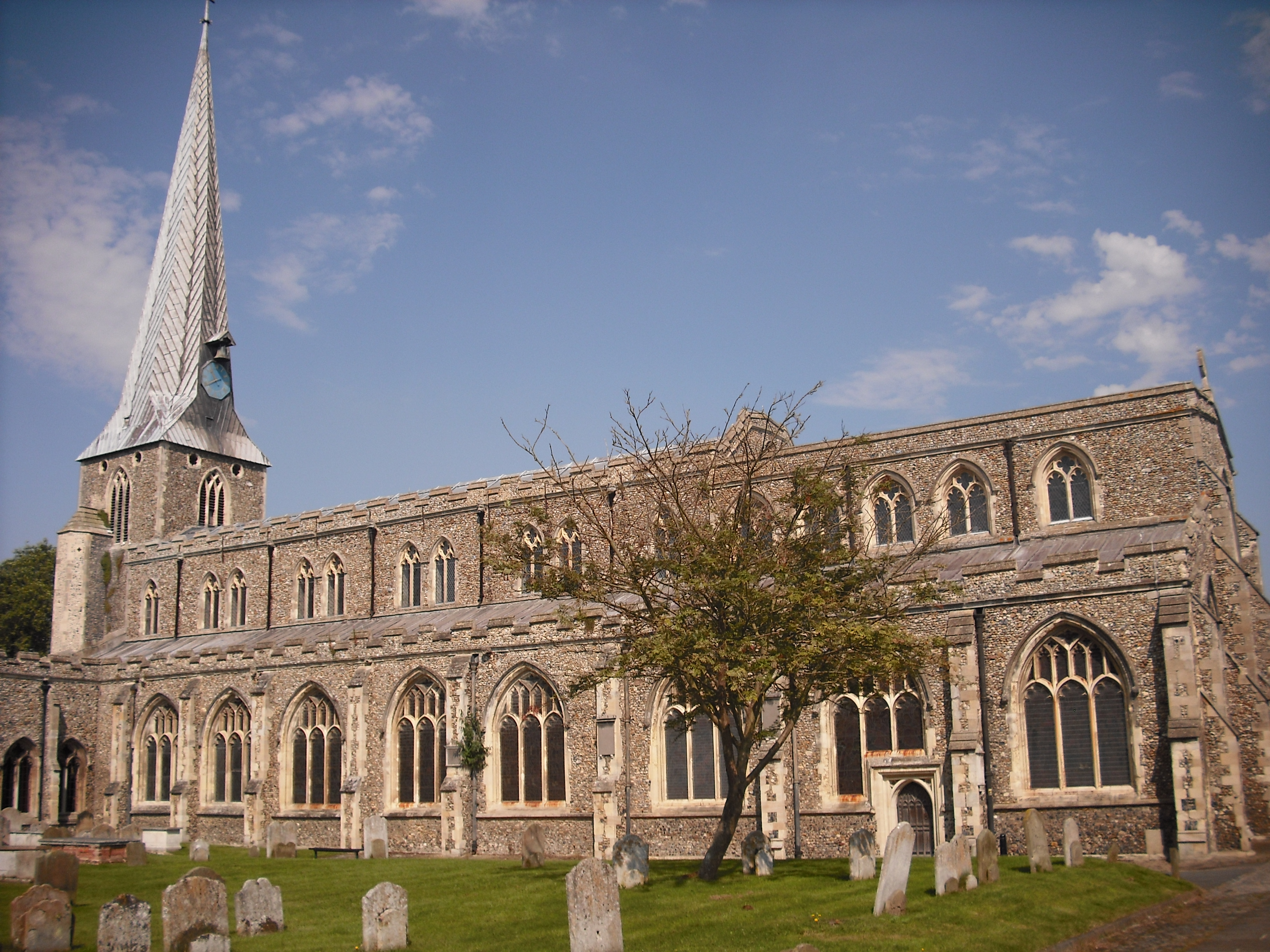
The church from the south in 2012

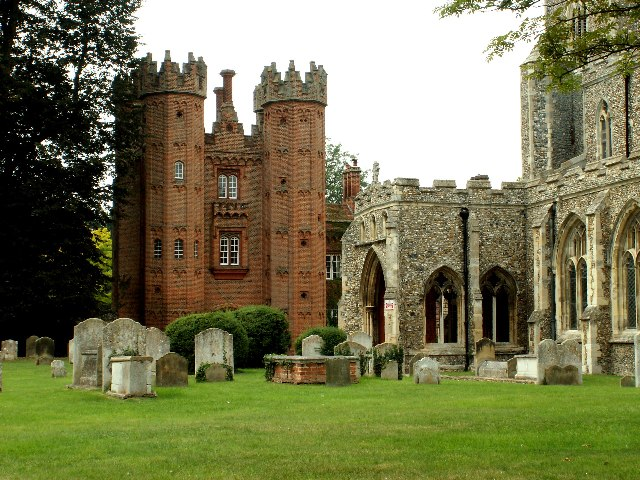
Deanery tower adjacent to the church

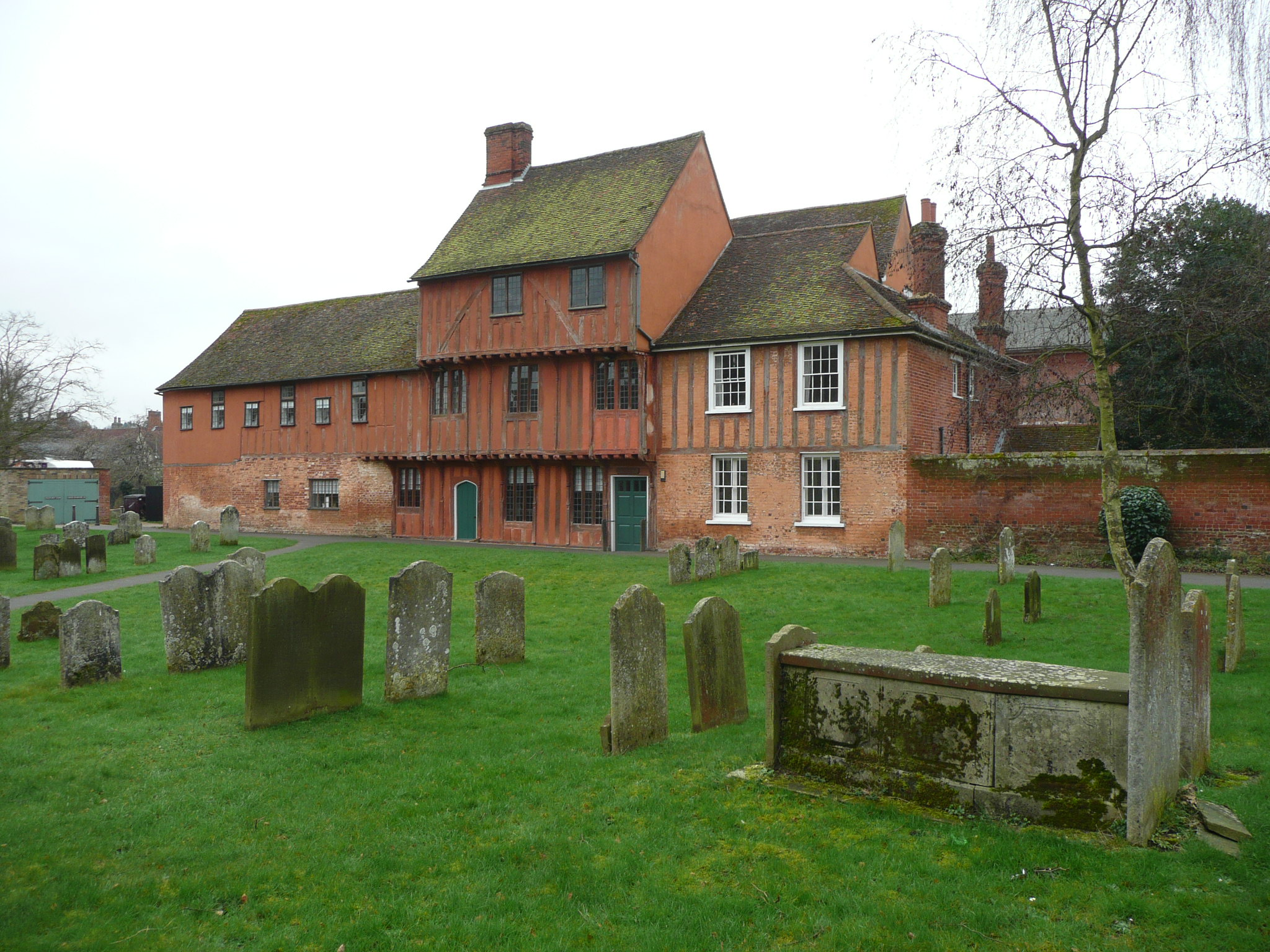
Guildhall and churchyard

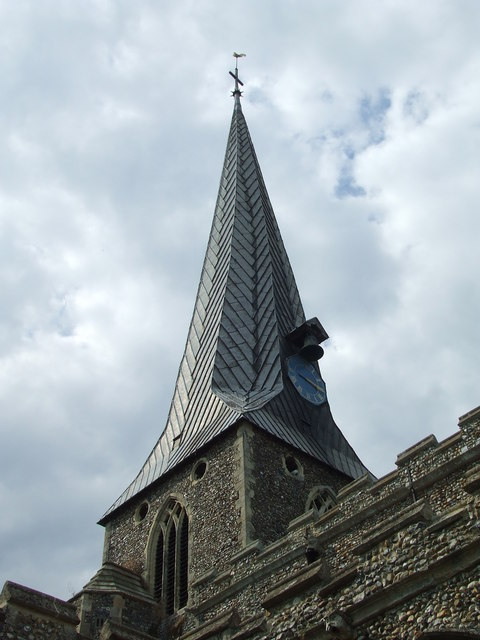
St Mary's twisted spire

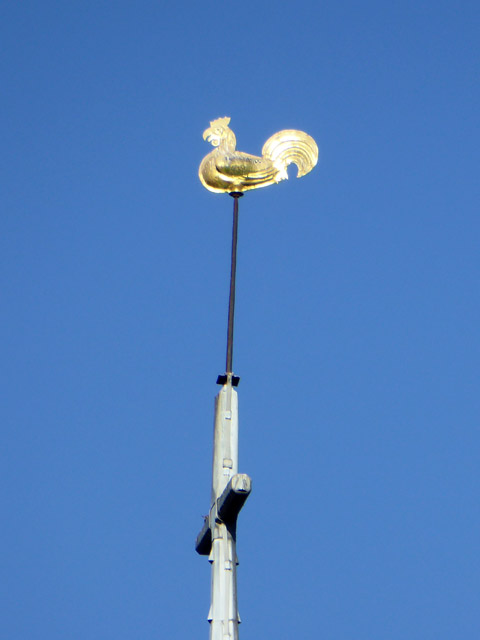
Weather cock atop the spire

St. Mary's Church, Hadleigh by Thomas Gainsborough (c. 1748)

== Sources ==
- Bettley, James; Pevsner, Nikolaus (2015). Suffolk: West. The Buildings of England. New Haven, US and London: Yale University Press. ISBN 978-0-300-19655-9.
- Tracy, Charles (2007). "Master William Pykenham, LL.D (c. 1425-97) Scholar, Churchman, Lawyer and Gatehouse Builder" (PDF). Proceedings of the Suffolk Institute of Archaeology and History. XLI Part 3.
