= Edward Crome =

English reformer and courtier (died 1562)

Edward Crome (died 1562) was an English reformer and courtier.

Crome was arrested in April 1546 for heresy. He recanted, but when made to do this again, publicly, he attacked the Mass and transubstantiation.

== Life ==
Crome may have been born in Worcestershire. He was educated at Cambridge, taking the degrees of BA in 1503, MA in 1507, and DD in 1526. He was a fellow of Gonville Hall.

In 1516 Crome was the university preacher. He was at Cambridge until he attracted Henry VIII's notice by his approval of Thomas Cranmer's book demonstrating the nullity of the king's marriage with Catherine of Aragon. By his action Crome was one of the delegates appointed by the university, 4 February 1530, to discuss and decide the same question proposed by the king. During the following Lent he was three times commanded to preach before the king, and shortly after (24 May) was one of the representatives of his university who, together with the same number from Oxford, assisted the Archbishop of Canterbury and Bishop of Durham in drawing up a condemnation of certain doctrinal views. These were expressed in certain English religious books, such as The Wicked Mammon and The Obedience of a Christian Man, which assailed the Catholic doctrines of purgatory, the merit derived from good works, invocation of saints, confession, and others.

It was probably about this time that Crome became parson of St Antholin's Church in the city of London, a rectory in the gift of the dean and chapter of St.Paul's. While at Cambridge Crome had gained some insight into the ideas of religious reformers by attending the meetings of "gospellers" at the White Horse tavern in St. Benet's, and in spite of his acquiescence in the prohibition of their books, his preaching was so coloured with their views that he was brought before the Bishop of London to be examined. At his trial the king himself was present. The answers he gave were in accordance with the popular articles of belief, even in such matters as purgatory and the efficacy of fasting. His confessions were immediately printed by the bishops, but old friends muttered openly that he was lying; speaking against his conscience in preaching purgatory. Articles were formally produced against him by Hugh Latimer, and Thomas Bilney in the convocation of March 1531, but given his recantation no further steps were taken.

In 1534 Crome moved to the church of St Mary Aldermary, which Queen Anne Boleyn procured for him by her influence with Archbishop Cranmer, a patron. A few years later (1539) Cranmer tried to obtain for him the deanery of Canterbury, but was not successful. At about this time Crome is frequently mentioned in connection with Latimer, Bilney, and Robert Barnes; he was one of the preachers appointed by Humfrey Monmouth, a leading London citizen and evangelical, to preach memorial sermons in the church of All Hallows Barking.

After the passing of the Act of Six Articles in 1539, in consequence of which Latimer and Nicholas Shaxton, bishop of Salisbury, resigned their sees and were imprisoned, Crome preached two sermons which his enemies hoped would give them a handle; but he went to the king and asked him to cease his severities. No proceedings were at that time taken against him, and not long after (July 1540) a universal pardon was granted. Crome did not, however, alter his opinions and preaching: a controversy against Nicholas Wilson. After causing some stir in the city, they were both forbidden to preach again until they had been examined by King and Council. This was done on Christmas Day 1540. The articles alleged against Crome were denial of justification by works, the efficacy of masses for the dead and prayers to saints, and the non-necessity of truths not deduced from holy scripture. His answer was a rejoinder argument that these articles were true and orthodox; but the king only ordered him to preach at St Paul's Cross and read a recantation with a statement that would in future be punished if hereafter he were to be convicted of a similar offence. Crome obeyed the King's instruction but as his sermon contained too little reference to the formal recantation which he read, his licence to preach was taken away.

At Lent 1546 Crome again got into trouble for a sermon preached at the church of St. Thomas of Acre, or Mercers' Chapel, directed against the sacrifice of the mass. Arrested in May he was brought before Bishop Stephen Gardiner and others of the council he was ordered as before to preach in contradiction of what he had said at St Paul's Cross, but his sermon rather hinted that the king's recent abolition of chantries showed that he held the same opinion. This was not considered satisfactory, and he had to perform another recantation on Trinity Sunday. Under interrogation he revealed the names of several Protestant associates including the self-confessed Lincolnshire woman Anne Askew, later considered a treasonous subversive. He also exposed Sir George Blagge, a poet and court favourite of the king, Master Wourley, a Sewer John Lassels, a client of the Howard family, and William Morice, about whom little is otherwise known. The conservative reaction attempted to pick up their sinister inquisition where they had left it in 1542; but largely failed to victimise Protestants when the King jumped to the Queen's defence.

During the reign of Edward VI, Crome appears to have lived quietly. After Queen Mary's accession he was again arrested for preaching without licence and committed to the Fleet Prison (13 January 1554), but a year elapsed before he was brought up for trial. In January 1555 many of his friends were examined and condemned. Hooper, Rogers, Bishop Ferrars of St. David's, and others were burnt. Crome was given time to answer, and having had some practice in the art of recantation made sufficient compliance to save himself from the stake. It was proposed that he, Rogers, and Bradford should be sent to Cambridge to discuss with orthodox scholars, as Cranmer, Ridley, and Latimer had done at Oxford, but they refused, not expecting fair play. Their reasons were published in a paper which was printed by John Foxe. How long Crome was kept in prison is unclear. He died between 20 and 26 June 1562, and was buried in his own church, St.Mary Aldermary, on the 29th.
