= William Petow =

English Franciscan friar

His Eminence William Petow O.F.M.
- Cardinal; Bishop of Salisbury
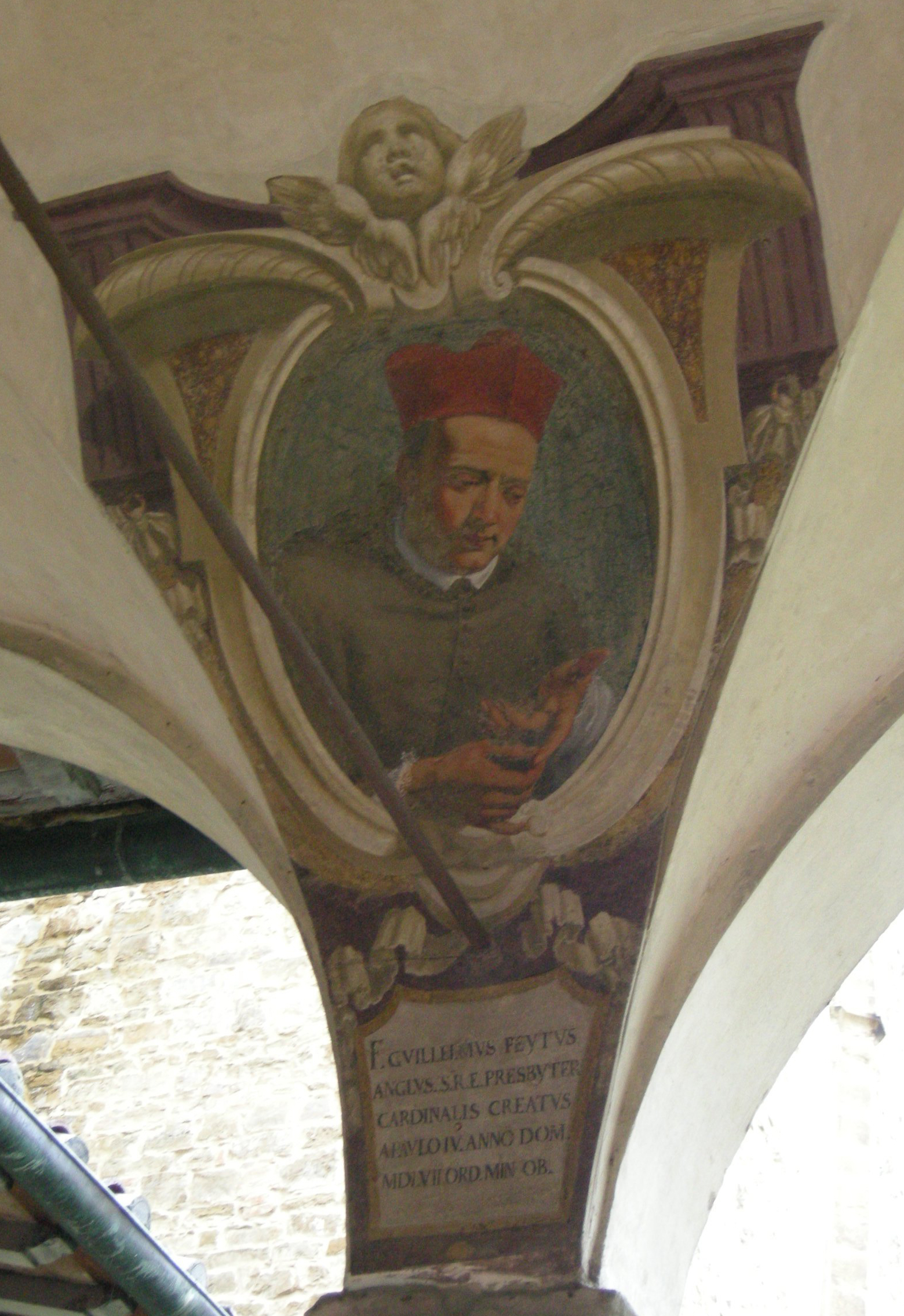
- Diocese: Salisbury
- Appointed: 30 March 1543
- Term ended: 1553 (resignation)
- Predecessor: Gasparo Contarini
- Successor: John Capon

Orders
- Created cardinal: 14 June 1557 by Pope Paul IV

Personal details
- Born: c. 1483 Chesterton, Warwickshire, England
- Died: 1558 (aged c. 75/74) London, England

William Petow (or Peto, Peyto; c. 1483 – April 1558 or 1559?) was an English Franciscan friar and, briefly, a Cardinal.

== Early life ==
Though his parentage was long unknown, it is now established that he was the son of Edward Peyto of Chesterton, Warwickshire, and Goditha, daughter of Sir Thomas Throckmorton of Coughton. He was educated under the guidance of the Grey Friars, that is the Franciscans and took his degree of B.A. at the University of Oxford; he was incorporated in the University of Cambridge, 1502–1503, and became M.A. there in 1505. In 1506 he was elected fellow of Queens' College, Cambridge, and on 14 June 1510, was incorporated M.A. at Oxford.

Entering the Observant branch of the Franciscan Order, he became known for his holiness of life, and was appointed confessor to Henry VIII's daughter Mary. Later on he was elected Provincial of England and was the holder of that office when in 1532 he denounced Henry's divorce in the King's presence; R. W. Chambers wrote that Peyto did not fall afoul of the statutes against prophesying evil to the king when he warned Henry of possible consequences in the future (having dogs lick his blood, as they had Ahab's, after death.), because he spoke conditionally of this happening if the king were to behave like Ahab. He was imprisoned till the end of that year, after which he went abroad and spent many years at Antwerp and elsewhere in the Low Countries, being active on behalf of all Catholic interests.

== Exile ==
In 1539 Petow was included in the Act of Attainder passed against Cardinal Pole and his friends (31 Hen. 8. c. 5), but he was in Italy at the time and remained there out of the king's reach. On 30 March 1543, Pope Paul III nominated him Bishop of Salisbury, though he could not then obtain possession of his diocese. On Henry VIII's death in 1547, Petow's reputation was greatly enhanced, as reported by Gilbert Burnet in his History of the Reformation of the Church of England, when Henry's coffin, having sustained some damage from jolting along the rough roads to Windsor, was placed at the former Sion Abbey for a night, where some bodily fluids mixed with blood leaked through a cleft in the lead coffin onto the pavement; the next morning, when a workman came to repair the damage, a dog crept up and was observed licking up the fluid, in apparent fulfillment of Petow's prophecy. Nevertheless, Petow did not claim the see even on the accession of the Roman Catholic Mary I in 1553, but resigned it and retired to his old convent at Greenwich.

There he remained till Pope Paul IV, who had known him in Rome and highly esteemed him, decided to create him cardinal and papal legate in place of Pole. But as Petow was very old and his powers were failing, he declined both dignities. While he was subsequently created cardinal on 14 June 1557, Queen Mary would not allow him to receive the hat, and his appointment was received with public derision.

It was a tradition among the Franciscans that he was pelted with stones by a London mob, and so injured that he shortly afterwards died. Other accounts represent him as dying in France.

The date frequently assigned for his death (April, 1558) is likely incorrect, as on 31 October 1558, Queen Mary wrote to the pope that she had offered to reinstate him in the Bishopric of Salisbury on the death of Bishop Capon, but that he had declined because of age and infirmity.

Catholic Church titles
Preceded by Gasparo Contarini as administrator	— TITULAR — Bishop of Salisbury; 1542–1553	Succeeded by John Capon as recognized bishop
