= Thomas D'Oyly =

Thomas D'Oyly (fl. 1585) was an English antiquary.

== Life ==
D'Oyly was the second son of Sir Henry D'Oyly, knight, of Pondhall in the parish of Hadleigh, Suffolk and his wife Jane, daughter and sole heiress of William Ellwyn of Wiggenhall St. Germans, Norfolk, was born in or about 1530.

He was admitted a member of Gray's Inn in 1555. In 1559 he is found acting as steward to Archbishop Matthew Parker. He soon rose into favour with the archbishop, and had the degree of D.C.L. conferred on him

D'Oyly appears to have lived variously at Croydon, Surrey; at Layham, Suffolk; and at St Dunstan-in-the-West, London. He was still alive in 1585.

== Works ==
He became a member of the Society of Antiquaries. Two of his contributions to the society are preserved in Thomas Hearne's Collection of Curious Discourses (ed. 1771, i. 175–6, 183–4), from transcripts made by Dr. Thomas Smith from the Cotton manuscripts. The subject of one is Of the Antiquity of Arms, the other (written in French) treats Of the Etymology, Dignity, and Antiquity of Dukes.

== Family ==
He was married twice: first, when scarcely seventeen, to Elizabeth, only child of Ralph Bendish of Topsfield Hall in Hadleigh, Suffolk, who died 2 August 1553; and, secondly, at Hadleigh, 11 February 1565, to Anne Crosse of that place. By both marriages he had issue. The eldest surviving son of the second marriage, Thomas D'Oyly, married Joane Baker, niece of Archbishop Parker.
