= Rowland Taylor =

English Protestant martyr (c.1510–1555)

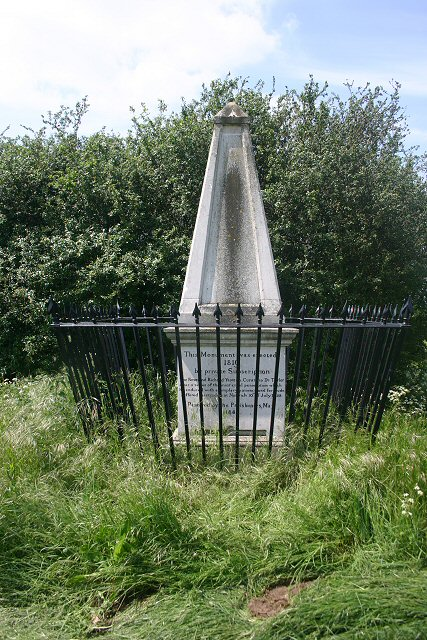
The Taylor Memorial, Aldham Common, erected 1818, restored 1882

Rowland Taylor (sometimes spelled "Tayler") (about 1510 – 9 February 1555) was an English Protestant martyr during the Marian Persecutions.

At the time of his death, he was Rector of Hadleigh in Suffolk. He was burnt at the stake at nearby Aldham Common.

== Early life and education ==
Taylor was born at Rothbury in Northumberland. In 1530, he received his LL.B. degree from the University of Cambridge. From 1531 to 1538 he was principal of Burden Hostel there. In 1534, he received the LL.D. from Cambridge, the same year Martin Luther completed his German Bible. One year later, in 1535, William Tyndale was tried and denounced as a heretic for his new English Bible translation. Tyndale was burned at the stake in 1536.

== Religious career ==
- In the late 1530s Taylor served as Hugh Latimer's chaplain and commissary general of the diocese of Winchester.
- In March 1538 Taylor was collated by Latimer to the St Mary's parish church of Hanbury, Worcestershire.
- When Latimer resigned, Taylor was taken under the wing of Thomas Cranmer, living with him and (1539) serving as his chaplain. He was ordained by Cranmer and admitted to the parish church of St Swithin's in Worcester. He was thus given his licence to preach and did so in the diocese of London.
- On 16 April 1544, he was presented to the living of Hadleigh, Suffolk.
- In 1543 the English Parliament banned Tyndale's English version and all public reading of the Bible by laymen. Religious persecution of Protestant clergy, especially by Roman Catholics, intensified in Britain at this time.
- In 1546 the Council of Trent, an ecumenical council of the Catholic Church, decreed that the Latin Vulgate was the authoritative version of the Bible.
- In the summer of 1547, Taylor was employed as a preacher for the royal visitation within the dioceses of Lincoln, Oxford, Lichfield and Coventry.
- On 15 August 1547, he became canon of Rochester, the same year during which King Henry VIII had died in January.
- In 1548, Taylor was appointed archdeacon of Bury St Edmunds and preached at the request of the Lord Mayor at Whitsuntide or Pentecost.
- Edward VI, who reigned from 1547 to 1553, followed Henry VIII, and in 1549 the Book of Common Prayer became the Protestant liturgical text in England.
- In 1550, Taylor was called to serve on a commission against Anabaptists. The same year, he also helped to administer the vacant diocese of Norwich.
- In 1551, at age 41, Taylor was made archdeacon of Exeter in the diocese of Exeter, was also appointed one of the Six Preachers of Canterbury Cathedral and was appointed chancellor to Bishop Nicholas Ridley. His leadership was expanded by serving on a commission to revise the ecclesiastical laws.
- In 1552, he helped administer the vacant diocese of Worcester.

== Political troubles from 1553 ==
Taylor's troubles began on 25 July 1553. He was arrested just six days after the new queen, Mary I, ascended the throne. Aside from the fact that Taylor had supported Lady Jane Grey, Mary's rival, he was also charged with heresy for having preached a sermon in Bury St Edmunds denouncing the Roman Catholic practice of clerical celibacy, which required that a priest in holy orders be unmarried. Many English clergymen, including Taylor, had abandoned this teaching since the 1530s as a token of the English Reformation.

Taylor also denounced the Roman Catholic doctrine of transubstantiation, which is the belief that the two elements (bread and wine) taken during Holy Communion, or the Eucharist, actually become the body and blood of Jesus Christ. Since the Roman Catholic position is that the Eucharist (and the miracle of transubstantiation) is a sacrament commanded by God, anyone denying it, particularly a cleric or pastor, is considered a heretic. This teaching was opposed universally by the Reformed and Protestant Churches, who maintained that, since a sacrament is a sign, it cannot also be the thing signified. For similar reasons relating to the problem of idolatry, Taylor took issue with the Roman Catholic form of the Mass and received much support from the people of Hadleigh.

These issues came to a head after Edward VI died (6 July 1553) and was succeeded by Queen Mary I. In 1554, Mary began a programme of re-establishing Catholicism in England. However, the English clergy and Anglican faithful, whose hopes for a Protestant royal succession had been dashed by Mary's imprisonment and execution of Lady Jane Grey, saw it as a matter of English Christian duty to resist this backlash, not least to resist the political ambitions of the king of Spain (Philip II, whom Mary married) to draw England within the sphere of the Holy Roman Empire and its Roman Catholic satellites. Although Mary, as Henry VIII's eldest daughter, was a legitimate successor to Edward VI, England was no longer minded to tolerate a Roman Catholic monarch, and the courage and endurance unto death of men such as Taylor provided the public example which ensured that the Reformation was not in fact overturned, but became established in the realm of England.

On 26 March 1554, the Privy Council ordered the arrest of Taylor, and he thus appeared before Bishop Stephen Gardiner. The proceedings against Taylor ran over several months. During this time he was kept in the King's Bench Prison. While in prison he befriended many inmates and was instrumental in many conversions to Anglicanism.

== Trial and martyrdom ==
January 1555 was an ominous month for Anglican clergy in England. After several years of separation from Roman worship and governance, the accession of Mary I in 1553 and her immediate reversion to Roman Catholic rule in obedience to the Pope (an attempt to turn back the Reformation of the English church) led her to unleash her wrath upon those whom she defined as treasonably minded heretics. On 22 January 1555, Rowland Taylor (rector of Hadleigh in Suffolk) and several other clergy, including John Hooper, were examined by a commission of leading bishops and lawyers. As Lord Chancellor, Gardiner presided at the hearings. Just two days previously, on 20 January, Parliament had revived the old statute for burning convicted heretics.

One of the men, Edward Crome, recanted and was thus pardoned. William Barlow equivocated and was sent to the Tower of London, but not executed. Rowland Taylor, who remained committed, was probably taken to Poultry Compter Prison in London after his examination by Gardiner. Taylor gave a fervent defence of clerical marriage, which put him at odds with the Roman Catholic Church.

On 29 January 1555, Taylor was brought before Gardiner again at St Mary's. The next day he was excommunicated and sentenced to death. He was stripped of his clerical garments in a symbolic manner, and offered a last supper with his family.

His reaction to his accusers, as recorded by the martyrologist John Foxe, was this:

And although I know, that there is neither justice nor truth to be looked for at my adversaries hands, but rather imprisonment and cruel death: yet know my cause to be so good and righteous, and the truth so strong upon my side, that I will by God's grace go and appear before them and to their beards resist their false doings.

== Final words ==
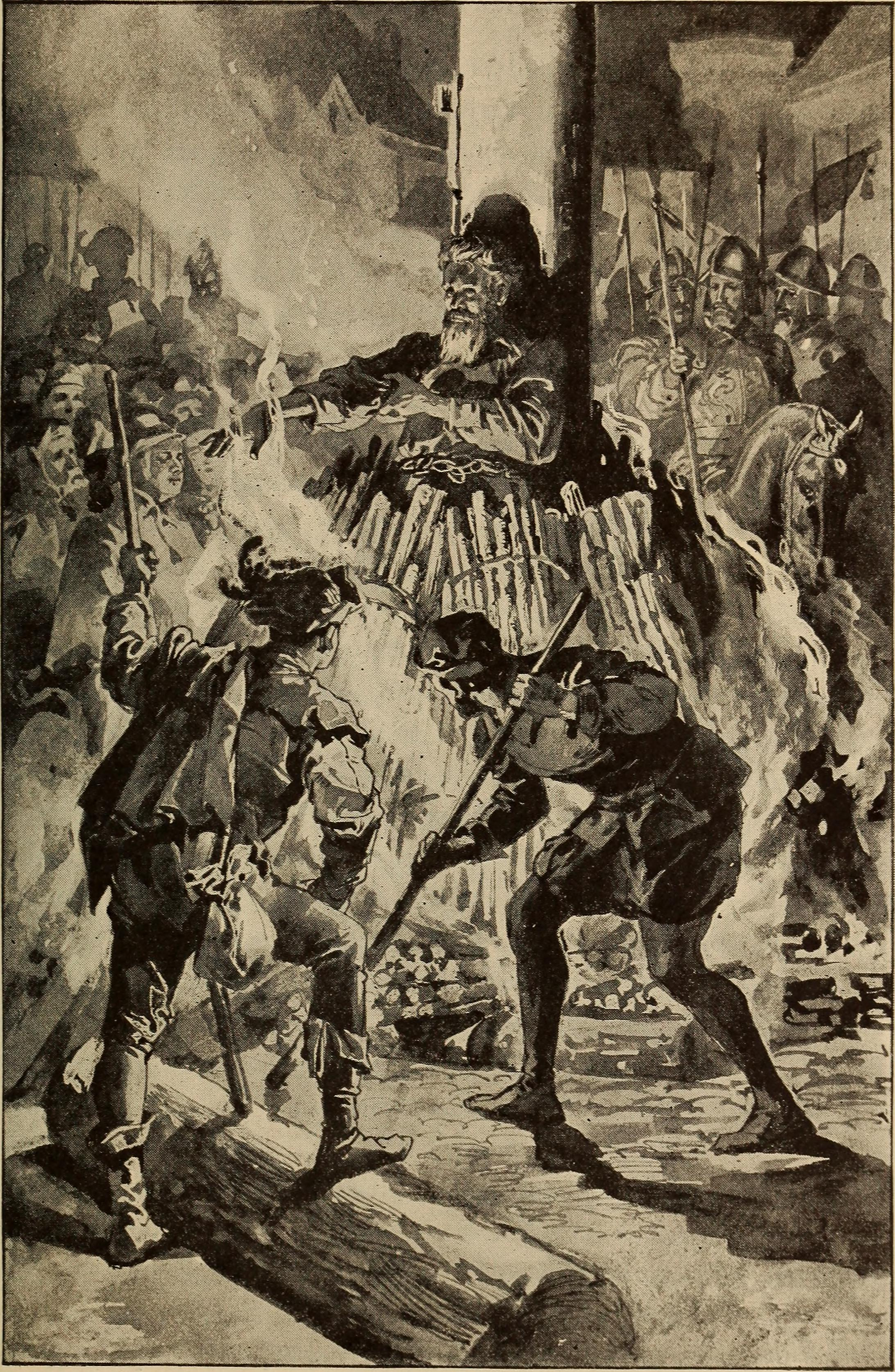
Illustration of the martyrdom from a 1907 edition of Foxe's Book of Martyrs

His wife awaited him in the early morning hours at St Botolph's Aldgate churchyard in London; they exchanged a few last brief words and Margaret promised to be present for his burning in a couple of days. That same day, Taylor was handed over to the sheriff of Essex at Chelmsford. Before he was handed over, he spoke these words to his family:

I say to my wife, and to my children, The Lord gave you unto me, and the Lord hath taken me from you, and you from me: blessed be the name of the Lord! I believe that they are blessed which die in the Lord. God careth for sparrows, and for the hairs of our heads. I have ever found Him more faithful and favourable, than is any father or husband. Trust ye therefore in Him by the means of our dear Saviour Christ's merits: believe, love, fear, and obey Him: pray to Him, for He hath promised to help. Count me not dead, for I shall certainly live, and never die. I go before, and you shall follow after, to our long home.

Taylor was taken from London back to Hadleigh, and was held in the cellar of Lavenham Guildhall. Following John Rogers on 4 February and Lawrence Saunders on 8 February, Taylor became Mary's third Protestant to be burned at the stake. His execution took place on 9 February 1555, at Aldham Common just north of Hadleigh. His wife, two daughters, and his son Thomas were present that day.

His final words to his son Thomas, as reported by Foxe:

Almighty God bless thee, and give you his Holy Spirit, to be a true servant of Christ, to learn his word, and constantly to stand by his truth all the life long. And my son, see that thou fear God always. Fly from all sin and wicked living. Be virtuous, serve God daily with prayer, and apply thy boke. In anywise see thou be obedient to thy mother, love her, and serve her. Be ruled by her now in thy youth, and follow her good counsel in all things. Beware of lewd company of young men, that fear not God, but followeth their lewd lusts and vain appetites. Flee from whoredom, and hate all filthy lying, remembering that I thy father do die in the defense of holy marriage. And another day when God shall bless thee, love and cherish the poor people, and count that thy chief riches to be rich in alms. And when thy mother is waxed old, forsake her not, but provide for her to thy power, and see that she lacks nothing. For so will God bless thee, give thee long life upon earth, and prosperity, which I pray God to grant thee.

A local butcher was ordered to set a torch to the wood but resisted. A couple of bystanders finally threw a lighted torch onto the wood. A perhaps sympathetic guard, named Warwick, struck Taylor's head with a halberd, which apparently killed him instantly. The fire consumed his body shortly thereafter. That same day, John Hooper was burned at the stake in Gloucester.

== Memorials ==
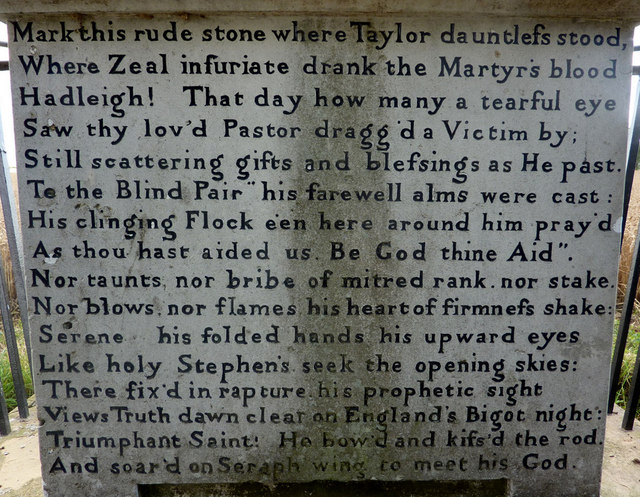
The inscription on the 1818 Taylor Monument

An unhewn stone, probably dating from the early 17th century, marks the place of Taylor's death at Aldham Common, where the B1070 Lady Lane meets the A1071 Ipswich Road. The stone is inscribed:

1555
D.TAYLOR.IN.DE
FENDING.THAT
WAS.GOOD.AT
THIS.PLAS.LEFT
HIS.BLODE

Next to the unhewn stone, there is also a pyramidal stone monument erected in 1818, and restored by parishioners in 1882. The monument has verses written by Nathan Drake painted on it. It is a Grade II listed building.

In St Mary's Church, Hadleigh, the south-east window in St John's Chapel commemorates Taylor.

== See also ==
- Lady Bird Johnson, his direct descendant
- List of Protestant martyrs of the English Reformation

== Sources ==
- W. J. Brown. The Life of Rowland Taylor LL.D. (Epworth Press, 1959)
- John Foxe. Foxe's Book of Martyr's. The account of Rowland Taylor's martyrdom is the entire subject of Chapter 14.
- Jasper Ridley. Bloody Mary's Martyrs: The Story of England's Terror. 2001.
