= Swallow and the Wolf =

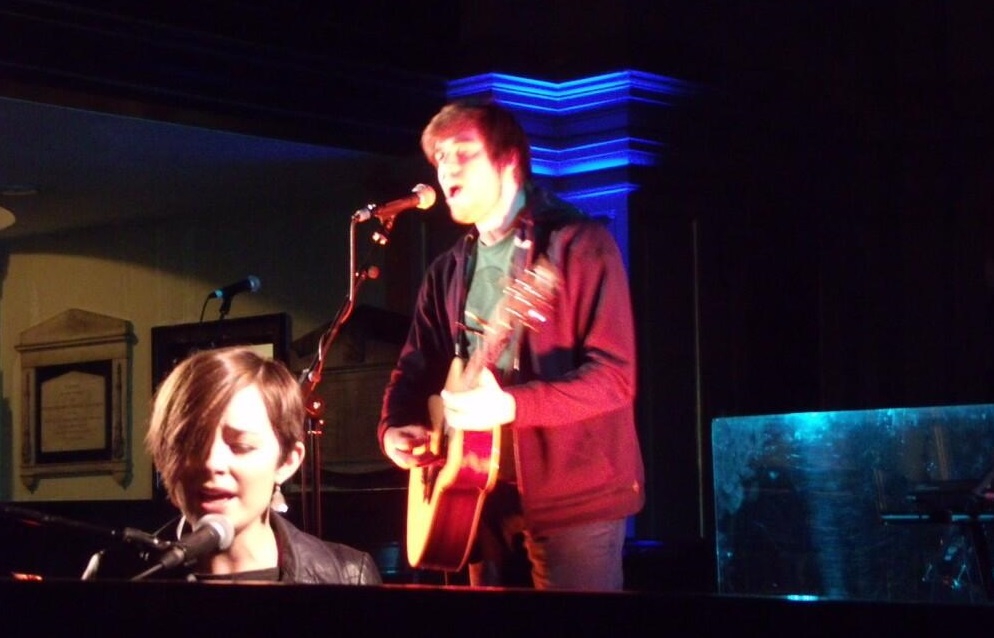
- Folk duo 'Swallow and the Wolf' (Russell Swallow playing guitar and Jess Kennedy on piano) playing at St Giles in the Field Church on 6 December 2013, as a support act to Phildel

Background information
- Origin: London, England
- Genres: Acoustic, alternative folk, indie folk, pop folk
- Instruments: Piano, guitar
- Years active: 2011–2015
- Members: Russell Swallow; Jess Kennedy

Swallow and the Wolf are an indie-folk duo, consisting of Hadleigh, Suffolk born, Russell Swallow, who provides main vocals, lyrics and plays the acoustic guitar, and Australian Jess Kennedy on piano, keyboards and harmonising vocals.

Tallulah Rendall's backup vocalist in 2011 was Russell.

Originally they were 'Russell Swallow and the Wolf' which was a 9-piece group with brass, strings, piano, drums, bass, guitar and extra singers. Russell had met Jess (from Melbourne), when she had put an advert online as a musician/writer looking for work. She originally joined as a pianist, but later became a co-writer / singer as well.

The set-up included singers such as Neo Joshua and Yvette Riby-Williams, both from 'The Boxettes' (previously Jarvis Cocker's backing singers), and Alison Jones (who was a solo violinist with the touring Riverdance production). These, and jazz and classically trained musicians from the Guildhall School of Music and Drama, were enticed with large Sunday roast meals to play these indie-folk pop tunes. Their debut was at the Edinburgh Fringe Festival, in August was awarded with a five star review and an invitation to play in the BBC's own EdFringe tent.

The Sunrise Mountain EP was released in 2012. It was produced by Gavin Hammond, Russell and Jess invited friend musicians to join them and contribute drums, bass, violin and additional vocals. The album includes; "Christmas Eve" (03:40), "Home" (02:56), "Paper Aeroplanes" ( 03:58), "Newfound Shore" (03:35), "Sunrise Mountain" (03:49) and "What Am I Supposed To Do?" (01:52).

Russell found touring with the band to be prohibitively expensive and time-consuming, so downsized to (a duo of Russell and Jess), as they shared music tastes, the desire to pursue writing and harmonise exceptionally well together. They still invite additional musicians to record and play live on various tracks. The band name has since changed to Swallow and the Wolf.

The duo then released a 3-track single Every Time She Comes (digital album) on 7 May 2013. It contains "Every Time She Comes" (01:52), produced by Gavin Hammond, and "Charge of The Light Brigade" (03:40) and "Africa" (03:53) each recorded at Urchin Studios with Dan Cox, and produced by Russell.

They subsequently recorded their second EP 'Fire EP' at Guy Chambers's Sleeper Studios with producer Oliver Som (formerly an engineer on the Hillsborough charity single version of He Ain't Heavy, He's My Brother by The Hollies.

On 22 October 2013, they released the track "Fire" as a single, with a launch party at 'Apartment 58' in the Centre Point tower.

A recording of The Devil Is A Wicked Puppeteer, was recorded live at The Union Chapel at this time, again with producer Oliver Som and engineer Cy Reynolds.

The duo self-released their Fire EP on 19 May, featuring 3-tracks Fire, Fight Tonight and SOS, and conducted a DIY tour of the UK, and small festivals.

They head back into the studio with Oliver Som in June to record their next EP, due for release in the Autumn, along with a UK and German tour.

== Reviews ==
"An acoustic evangelist… clearly a man with poetry in his soul" – Tom Robinson, BBC Radio 6 Music.

"I'm really loving Sirens" (track from forthcoming album) – Chris Hawkins, BBC Radio 6 Music.
