= Margaret Cheyne =

English Catholic martyr (died 1537)

Margaret Cheyne, later Margaret Bulmer (died 25 May 1537), was a woman burned at the stake for high treason in the aftermath of the Pilgrimage of Grace and Bigod's Rebellion during the reign of Henry VIII of England.

== Family life ==
According to some reports, Margaret was the illegitimate daughter of Edward Stafford, 3rd Duke of Buckingham. Her first husband was William Cheyne of London.

At some point before 1536, Cheyne sold her to Sir John Bulmer of Wilton, and she became his mistress. This relationship seems to have been mutually affectionate, and the couple were married by 1536, after both of their former spouses had reportedly died. Because it had originated in a wife sale, the legality of her second marriage (and therefore her perceived moral character) was disputed when she later stood trial. Margaret and John Bulmer had several children together, including the mining engineer Sir Bevis Bulmer.

== Role in the uprising ==
John Bulmer joined the Pilgrimage of Grace in 1536, and became one of its leaders. The extent of Margaret's involvement is unclear: Jennifer Gourlay suggests that she probably knew about the rebellion plots, although most of the evidence against her came from only a single source, the priest John Watts.

In January 1537 John Bulmer was arrested; that month, Margaret gave birth to their youngest son. She was arrested after John Watts claimed that she had goaded her husband to rebel. By late April 1537, she was a prisoner at the Tower of London.

The couple originally pleaded not guilty to the charge of high treason in May 1537, before changing their plea to guilty whilst the jury was considering its verdict. In her formal statement, Margaret admitted telling her husband that "the commons wanted a head". Both were sentenced to death and executed on 25 May 1537. John Bulmer was hanged and beheaded at Tyburn, whilst Margaret was burned at the stake at West Smithfield.

== Significance ==
Margaret was not granted the same mercy as other women who managed to escape execution despite having been far more vocal supporters of the uprisings. Megan Benson suggests that this disparity stemmed from several causes: she was perceived as being of questionable moral character; she was associated with leading rebels like Robert Aske and Francis Bigod; and (if the reports of her parentage were indeed true) she was a distant relative of the king. Madeleine and Ruth Dodds argued that the authorities chose to execute Margaret in order to set an example to other rebels and sympathisers:

"She committed no overt act of treason; her offences were merely words and silence.... It [her execution] was intended as an example to others. There can be no doubt that many women were ardent supporters of the Pilgrimage.... Lady Bulmer's execution ... was an object-lesson to husbands ... to teach them to distrust their wives."

The court records contain information about the Bulmers' relationship, and therefore provide important evidence about how some early participants in English wife sales actually perceived their relationship. Jennifer Gourlay notes that "of all the early modern wife sales recorded, this [the Bulmer case] reveals the most information on the participants and further, evidence exists as to the nature of the sale and to the woman's attitude towards it". She argues that the evidence of Margaret and John Bulmer's close relationship "highlights the potential for wife sales to be used as a means to construct an affectionate match, one which suited not only the buyer, but also the wife".

== See also ==
- Anne Askew
