= Layham =

Village in Suffolk, England

Coordinates: 52.028°N 0.966°E

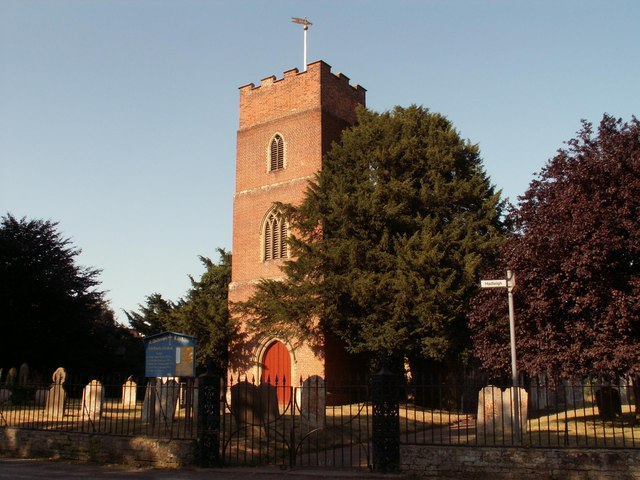
- St Andrew's Church

- Location within Suffolk
- Population: 589 (2011)
- District: Babergh
- Shire county: Suffolk
- Region: East
- Country: England
- Sovereign state: United Kingdom
- Post town: Ipswich
- Postcode district: IP7
- Dialling code: 01473
- UK Parliament: South Suffolk

Layham is a small village and a civil parish in southern Suffolk, England, situated between the town of Hadleigh, and the neighbouring village of Raydon.

The civil parish contains the villages Upper Layham and Lower Layham, separated by the River Brett. It is part of the Babergh district and falls within the South Suffolk parliamentary constituency.

It has a church, St Andrew's, and a public house, the Queen's Head, both situated in Lower Layham. More information on these and other aspects of Layham appear on the parish council's website.

== History ==
Layham is mentioned in the Little Domesday book.

"Æelfnoth held Layham from Harold TRE as a manor with three carucates of land. Then as now 4 villans and 7 bordars. Then five slaves now six. Then as now 2 ploughs in demesne and two ploughs belonging to the men. Eleven acres of meadow, one horse, fifteen head of cattle, fifteen pigs, 100 sheep and nineteen goats. Then it was worth seventy shillings now 100 shillings. It is half a league long and a half broad four and a half pennies in geld. St Edmund had the soke."

== Notable residents ==
- Thomas D'Oyly (16th C), antiquary.
