= Nicholas Shaxton =

English bishop (c. 1485 – 1556)

- Born: c. 1485; Norwich
- Died: 1556 (aged 70–71)
- Resting place: Gonville Hall
- Occupation: Bishop of Salisbury

Nicholas Shaxton (c. 1485 – 1556) was Bishop of Salisbury. For a time, he had been a Reformer, but recanted this position, returning to the Roman faith. Under Henry VIII, he attempted to persuade other Protestant leaders to also recant. Under Mary I, he took part in several heresy trials of those who became Protestant martyrs.

== Early life ==
He was a native of the diocese of Norwich, and studied at Cambridge, where he graduated B.A. in 1507. M.A. in 1510, B.D. in 1521 and D.D. in 1531. He was elected a fellow of Gonville Hall in 1510. In 1520 he was appointed a university preacher. He is mentioned by John Strype among those propagators of new views who used to frequent the 'White Horse'. He was president of Physick's Hostel, which was attached to Gonville Hall, 1512–3.

== Reformer ==
In February 1530 he was one of the committee of divines at Cambridge to whom the question of the king's marriage with Catherine of Aragon was referred, and his name was marked by Stephen Gardiner as favourable to the king's views. In May following he was one of the twelve Cambridge divines appointed to serve on a joint committee with twelve of Oxford in examining English books likely to disturb the faith of the people. But his own orthodoxy was called in question not long afterwards; and in May next year, when he was admitted inceptor in divinity, though one of the regents wrote asking Richard Nix, bishop of Norwich, to give him a licence to preach in his diocese, the bishop was not so easily satisfied.

From inquiries made at Cambridge he learned that the vice-chancellor had censured two points in a sermon which Shaxton had preached on Ash Wednesday: first, that it was wrong to assert publicly that there was no Purgatory, but not damnable to think so; and, secondly, that no man could be chaste by prayers or fasting unless God made him so. He had also confessed that he had prayed at mass that the clergy might be relieved of celibacy. These points he had been persuaded to give up so as to avoid open abjuration; but the vice-chancellor had compelled him and others who proceeded that year in divinity to take a special oath to renounce the errors of John Wiclif, John Huss, and Martin Luther. The bishop, however, still insisted on a formal act of abjuration, because he had purchased heretical books and conveyed them into his diocese. And when Thomas Bilney was burned shortly afterwards at Norwich, recanting at the stake heresies much the same as Shaxton's, the bishop is reported to have said, 'Christ's mother! I fear I have burned Abel and let Cain go.'

In 1533, however, Shaxton was presented by the king to the parish church of Fuggleston in Wiltshire, and was made treasurer of Salisbury Cathedral; his promotion was by the influence of Anne Boleyn, who appointed him her almoner; and next year Richard Sampson, dean of the Chapel Royal, agreed Thomas Cranmer's request that Shaxton should preach before the king the third Sunday in Lent. On 27 April 1534 he was promoted to a canonry in St. Stephen's, Westminster, which he gave up early next year on obtaining the bishopric of Salisbury. He was regarded, alongside Hugh Latimer and William Barlow as one of the most well known new bishops of the 1530s. The previous bishop Cardinal Campeggio had been dismissed by the king as Bishop of Salisbury in 1534. After a year left vacant, Shaxton was appointed by Thomas Cromwell in his place. He was elected to that see on 22 February 1535, and consecrated by Cranmer - assisted by John Stokesley, Bishop of London; and Thomas Chetham, suffragan bishop of Canterbury and Bishop of Sidon - on 6 April, at St Stephen's Chapel, Westminster, the temporalities having been already restored to him on the 1st. He desired Cromwell to write to the canons of his cathedral to exact no oath of him for his bishopric, as he received it only from the king. A paper of this date speaks of a 'book,' apparently on political matters, which he had submitted to the king, and on which various judgments were passed by those to whom it was shown. On 4 June he wrote to Cromwell, cordially approving the king's letters directing the bishops to set forth his royal supremacy. On 8 July the liberties of his bishopric were restored, which were declared to have been forfeited by Campeggio.

Early in 1536 Shaxton and Hugh Latimer were assessors, with Archbishop Cranmer, in examining a fanatic who said he had seen a vision of the Trinity and Our Lady, and had a message from the latter to preach that she insisted on being honoured as of old. Shortly after the same three bishops examined John Lambert, who had said it was sin to pray to saints. His examiners were so far in sympathy with him that they all considered the practice unnecessary, but said it was not to be denounced as sin.

As a member of convocation, Shaxton signed not only the 'articles about religion' drawn up in 1536, but also the declaration 'touching the sacrament of holy orders,' and the reasons why general councils should be summoned by princes, and not by the sole authority of the pope. When the Lincolnshire rebellion broke out in October, he was called on to furnish two hundred men out of his bishopric to serve the king, and he was one of the six bishops 'whom the rebels complained of as subverting the faith. In Salisbury, the king's proclamations as head of the church were torn down, and his own chaplain, a Scot, who had been a friar, was put in prison by the mayor and aldermen for a sermon in which he threatened to inform the king's council of such matters. Shaxton had further disputes with the municipal authorities, who claimed that the city was the king's city, while he maintained that by a grant of Edward IV it was the bishop's. This was an old controversy, complicated by the Reformation changes. The mayor and aldermen wrote earnestly to Cromwell against Shaxton having a confirmation of the liberties granted to his predecessors, and ultimately imprisoned his under-bailiff Goodall.

In 1537 he took part in the discussion among the bishops as to the number of the sacraments, opposing John Stokesley, who maintained that there were seven. Along with John Capon, he gave an opinion in favour of confirmation as being a sacrament of the New Testament, though not instituted by Christ himself. He also signed 'the bishops' book,' entitled The Institution of a Christian Man. In 1538 he issued injunctions to his clergy, which were printed at the time by John Byddell. Like other bishops of that day, however, he exercised his episcopal functions subject to the control of Cromwell, the king's vicegerent, who became tired of complaints against him.

== Resignation and heresy charge ==
Shaxton resigned his bishopric in 1539 because he opposed the King's Six Articles, for which he was imprisoned. He was one of the bishops who opposed the articles in parliament, till the king, as one of the lords present remarked, 'confounded them all with God's learning.' When the act was passed he and Latimer resigned their bishoprics. He was desired, when he gave in his resignation, to keep it secret; but it soon became known, and he wrote to ask Cromwell whether he should dress like a priest or like a bishop. Early in July he was seen in company with the archbishop of Canterbury in a priest's gown. A congé d'élire was issued for Salisbury on the 7th.

The King ordered that Latimer and Shaxton be detained at the home of Bishop Sampson of Chichester. Shaxton was committed to the custody of John Clerk. On 9 November he wrote from his confinement at Chew in Somerset, desiring liberty and a pension; he and Latimer were both pensioned.

In the spring of 1540 he, like Latimer, had the benefit of the general pardon, but was released only with a prohibition from preaching or coming near London or either of the universities, or returning to his former diocese. For some years he lived in obscurity. He held a parochial charge as curate at Hadleigh in Suffolk, and in the spring of 1546 was summoned to London to answer for maintaining false doctrine on the sacrament. He said when he left that he should either have to burn or to forsake the truth, and on 18 June he, with Anne Askew and two others, was arraigned for heresy at the Guildhall. All four were condemned to execution; but the king sent Bishops Edmund Bonner and Nicholas Heath, and his chaplains, Dr. Robinson and Dr. Redman, to confer with Shaxton and his fellow prisoner, Nicholas White, and they succeeded in persuading both of them to repudiate their heresy.

On 9 July Shaxton signed a recantation in thirteen articles, which was published at the time with a prefatory epistle to Henry VIII, acknowledging the king's mercy to him in his old age. He was then sent to Anne Askew to urge her to do likewise; but Bonner had already tried in vain to persuade her, and according to John Foxe in his Acts and Monuments she told Shaxton it would have been better for him that he had never been born. He was appointed to preach the sermon at her burning on 16 July. On Sunday, 1 August he preached at St Paul's Cross, declaring how he fell into erroneous opinion, and urged his hearers to beware of heretical books.

In September he prevailed on John Taylor, who had been suspected of similar heresies, to sign the same articles as he had done. At his request the king gave him the mastership of St. Giles's Hospital at Norwich.

== Later life ==
He was married, but now separated from his wife; they never reconciled. At the beginning of Edward VI's reign, on 6 March 1547, he was obliged to surrender to the king the Norwich hospital. Under Mary he became suffragan bishop of Ely to Thomas Thirlby. Sitting at Ely on 9 October 1555, along with the bishop's chancellor, he passed sentence on two Protestant martyrs, William Wolsey and Robert Pygot. Next year (1556) he was the chief of a body of divines and lawyers at Great St Mary's, Cambridge before whom, on Palm Sunday eve (28 March), another Protestant martyr, John Hullier, was examined.

He made his will on 5 August following, and died immediately after; the will was proved on the 9th. He desired to be buried in the chapel of Gonville Hall, and left to the hall his books, his house in St Andrew's parish in Cambridge, and some money.

== Family ==
Shaxton was married with three children; in 1555 he received a pardon from the Catholic church for his marriage. After his return to the Catholic church he separated from his wife permanently.

Church of England titles
Preceded by Lorenzo Campeggio	Bishop of Salisbury; 1535–1539	Succeeded by John Salcott
