= Upper Layham =

Village in Suffolk, England

Coordinates: 52.027°N 0.964°E

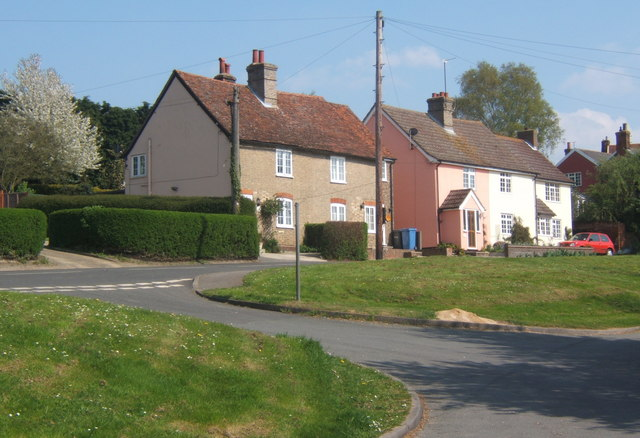

- Location within Suffolk
- Civil parish: Layham
- District: Babergh
- Shire county: Suffolk
- Region: East
- Country: England
- Sovereign state: United Kingdom
- Police: Suffolk
- Fire: Suffolk
- Ambulance: East of England

Upper Layham is a village on the B1070 road, in the civil parish of Layham, in the Babergh district, in the county of Suffolk, England. Upper Layham has a post office and a pub. It is located to the east of the smaller village of Lower Layham.

However, pedestrians/cyclists travelling from Upper Layham can use the footbridge by Layham Mill to cross the River Brett, and follow the path and lane leading to the Village Hall and St. Andrews Church.
