= Benton End =

House in Hadleigh, Suffolk, England

Coordinates: 52°02′00″N 0°57′47″E

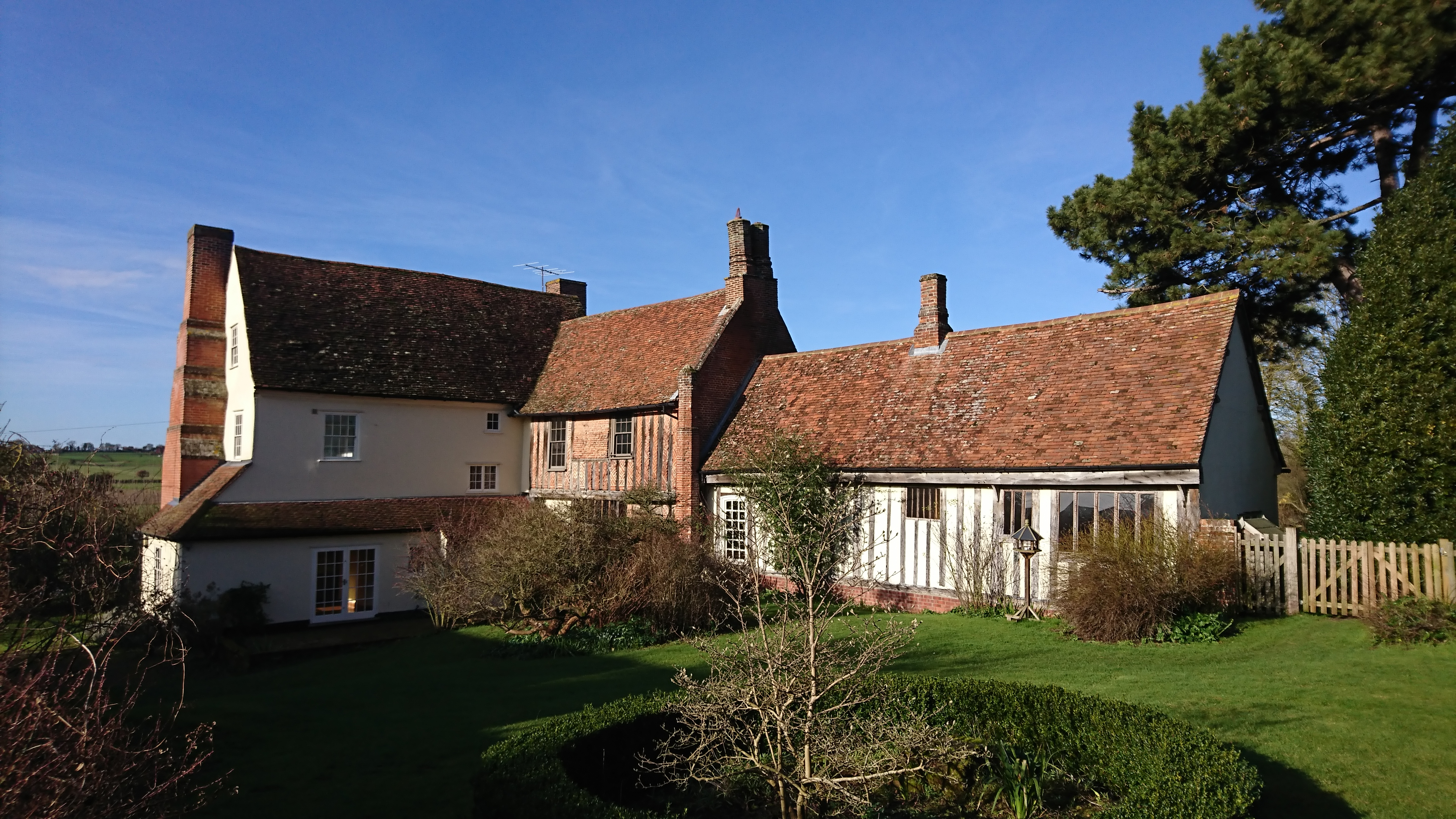
Benton End viewed from the garden in 2020

Benton End is a Grade II* listed sixteenth-century house located on the outskirts of the market town of Hadleigh in Suffolk, England. From 1939 to 1982 it was home to the artist Cedric Morris, who ran the East Anglian School of Painting and Drawing in the house, and in the garden grew a significant botanical collection.

== Building ==
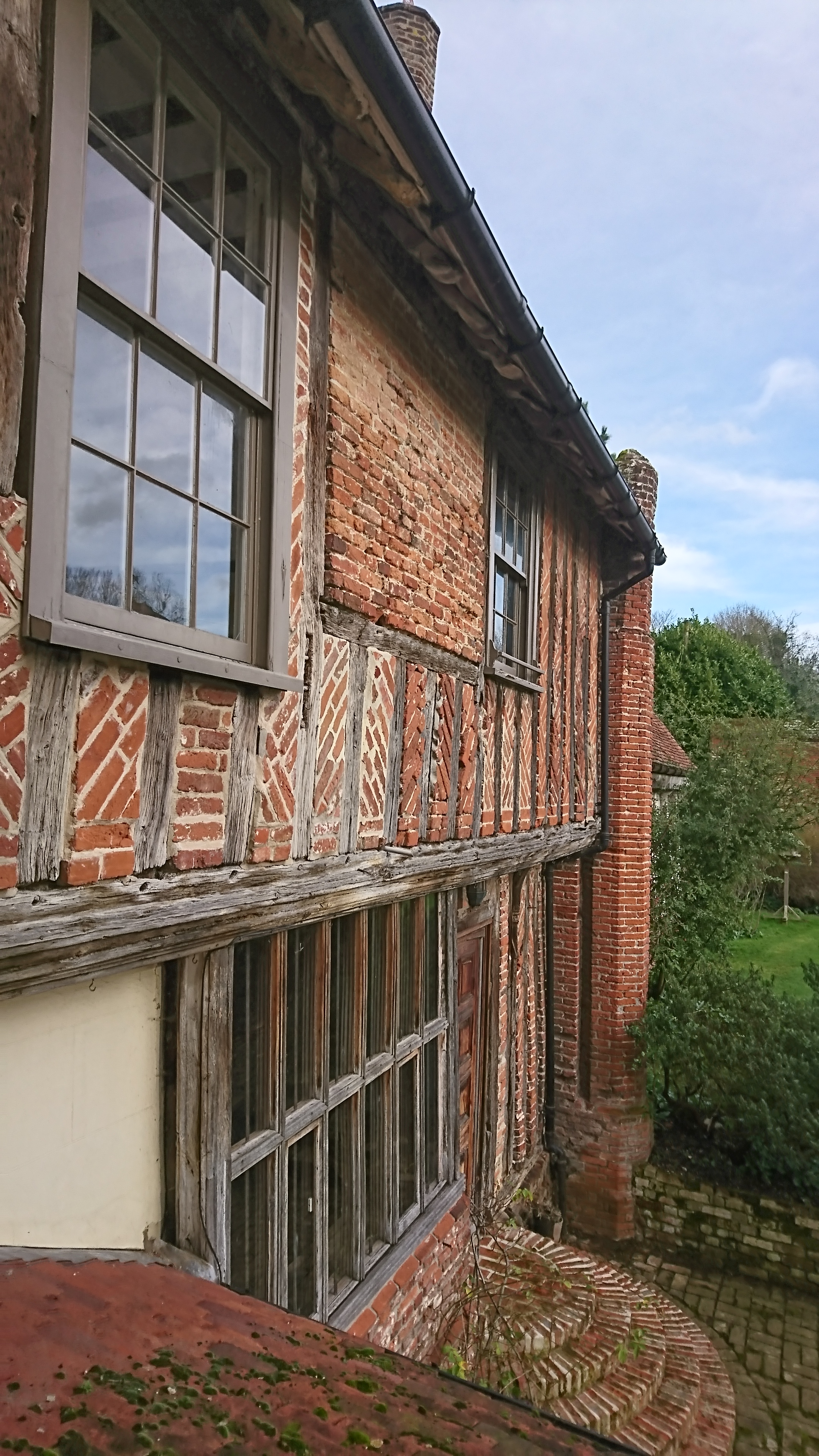
Brick nogging above the front entrance

Benton End is thought to have been built in the 1520s. The first documented inhabitant was Robert Rolfe, a cloth merchant and "chief inhabitant" of Hadleigh. Although later alterations have seen the house partly plastered and bay windows added, the original late-medieval timber structure with brick nogging remains intact and visible in parts of the house, including the current main entrance. The Architect responsible for the interior features is thought to be Sir Peter Cheyney.

== Notable owners and residents ==
- Parliamentarian John Bourchier inherited Benton End in 1627 after marrying into the Rolfe family.
- Botanist Adam Buddle may have grown up in the house, as his father inherited the house from his uncle the owner in 1686. Buddle was known as an expert in bryophytes, and the genus Buddleja was named in his honour.
- Artist and horticulturalist Cedric Morris lived at Benton End from 1939 to his death in 1982.

== East Anglian School of Painting and Drawing ==
Cedric Morris and his partner Arthur Lett-Haines acquired Benton End in 1939 after fire destroyed the previous site of their art school in Dedham, Essex. Benton End afforded space for Morris, Lett-Haines and many of their students to live as well as work at the school. This contributed to the communal atmosphere and encouraged its laissez-faire but inspiring approach to learning. Jon Lys Turner's biography of the illustrator Richard Chopping and his partner Denis Wirth-Miller, both alumni of the East Anglian School, characterises it as

a place for the free exchange of artistic ideas and techniques. The school was anti-hierarchical as well as anti-patriarchal, with little in the way of structure or rules, and provided a setting for sexual as well as artistic liberation.

While Morris focused on the students' work, Lett-Haines was in charge of the school's administration as well as cooking two meals a day. Thanks to Morris' work in the vegetable garden and Lett-Haines' enthusiasm for cooking, the community at Benton End did not experience hardships on the scale of wartime London – indeed, according to Lys Turner, the war years were "markedly hedonistic".

Through the 1940s and 1950s Benton End became the centre of a diverse community of twentieth-century artists, writers and horticulturalists. Among the students was Lucian Freud, who was a favourite of Morris and Lett-Haines despite his waywardness. Freud called Morris' portraits "revealing in a way that is almost improper", leading commentators to view Morris as a significant influence on Freud's style. Friends and visitors included the painters John Nash and Francis Bacon and the writers Ronald Blythe and Stephen Spender. Blythe described the atmosphere of Benton End as "robust and coarse, and exquisite and tentative all at once. Rough and ready and fine mannered. Also faintly dangerous." The illustrator Kathleen Hale, who wrote the Orlando the Marmalade Cat series, was also a frequent visitor to Benton End, as Lett-Haines' lover and as a friend and informal pupil of Morris.

== Cedric Morris's garden ==
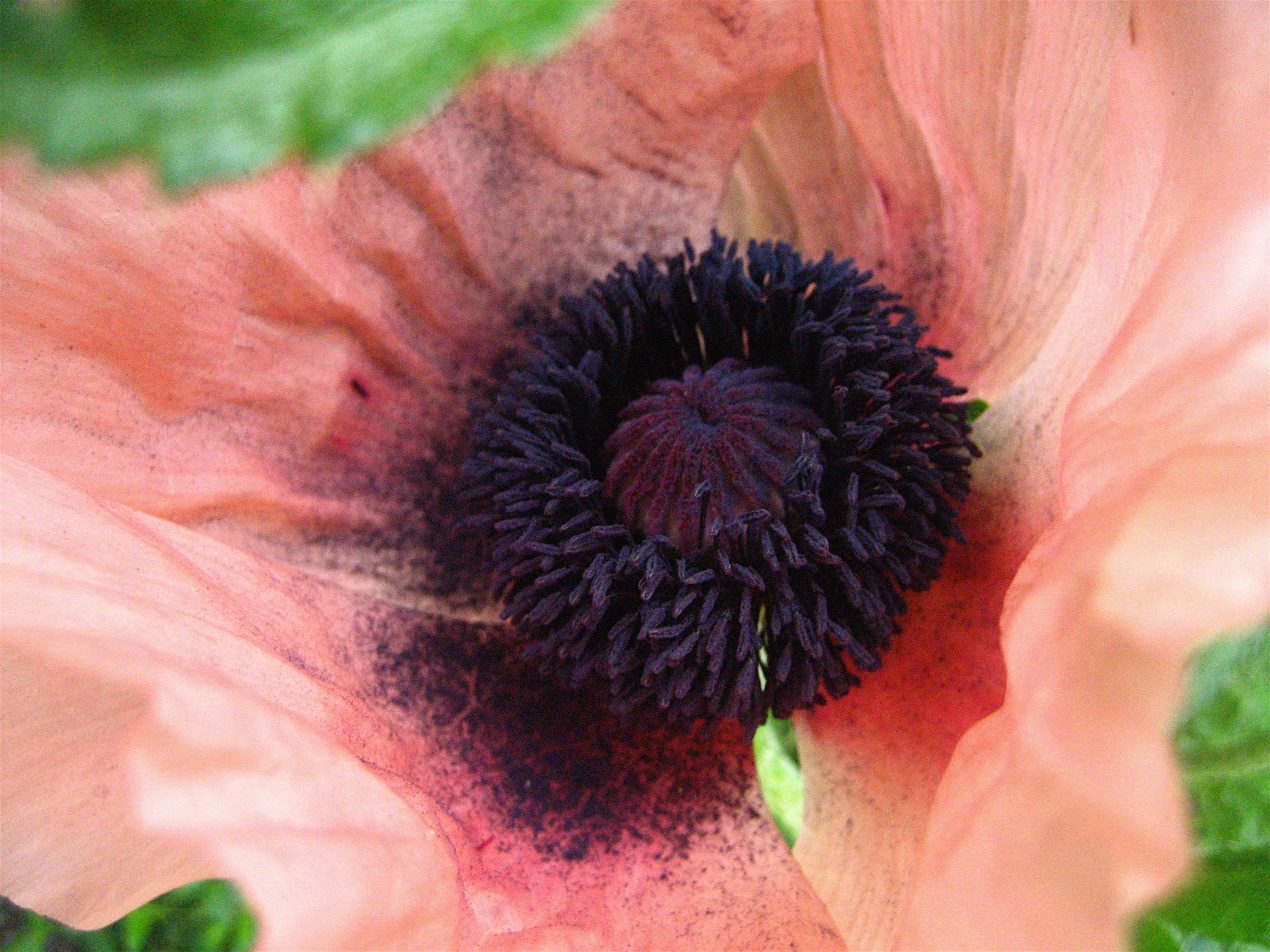
Papaver orientale 'Cedric Morris'

Morris grew rare and exotic plants at Benton End, which he collected on expeditions to the Mediterranean and North Africa and in many cases introduced to cultivation in Britain for the first time. He planted them in an idiosyncratic style which admirers have viewed as an extension of his work as a painter: Beth Chatto described the garden as a "bewildering, mind-stretching, eye-widening canvas of colour, textures and shapes". He was most prolific as a cultivator of irises; he grew around 1,000 varieties, and bred up to 90 cultivars of his own. His rose Rosa 'Sir Cedric Morris' and poppy Papaver orientale 'Cedric Morris' are both widely commercially available.

The garden Morris created, and the plants he grew, influenced many important figures in British horticulture. Constance Spry displayed rhubarb from his garden in her London shop, and Vita Sackville-West, a frequent visitor to Benton End, grew his irises at Sissinghurst. Most significantly, Morris became a mentor to Beth Chatto, who said that a large proportion of the plants in her gardens came from Benton End.

Sarah Cook, a former head gardener at Sissinghurst, who grew up in Hadleigh, is leading a project to track down, preserve and record all Cedric Morris's surviving introductions. Many of these were distributed to other horticulturalists after Morris' death by Jenny Robinson, whom Morris appointed as his horticultural executor. In 2015 Sarah Cook showed 25 Cedric Morris irises at the Chelsea Flower Show.

== Present day ==
The house was acquired by the Pinchbeck Charitable Trust in 2018, with the aim of restoring Morris' garden and establishing the house as an education centre in art and horticulture, as well as a memorial to Morris. In 2021 the house was gifted to the Garden Museum, London and leased to the newly formed the Benton End House and Garden Trust for restoration of the garden and an inclusive centre for art and gardening.
