= Oriental poppies =

Oriental poppies may refer to:

- Oriental poppy (Papaver orientale), a perennial flowering plant
- Oriental Poppies, a 1927 painting by Georgia O'Keeffe
