= Ronald Blythe =

British writer (1922–2023)

Ronald Blythe CBE, FRSL
- Born: Ronald George Blythe; 6 November 1922; Acton, Suffolk, England
- Died: 14 January 2023 (aged 100); Wormingford, Essex, England
- Occupations: Writer, essayist, editor
- Known for: Akenfield, "Word from Wormingford" (Church Times column)

Ronald George Blythe CBE FRSL (6 November 1922 – 14 January 2023) was a British writer, essayist and editor, best known for his work Akenfield (1969), an account of agricultural life in Suffolk from the turn of the century to the 1960s. He wrote a long-running and considerably praised weekly column in the Church Times entitled "Word from Wormingford".

== Early life and education ==
Blythe was born in Acton, Suffolk, on 6 November 1922, the eldest of six children. His father, Albert, who had seen action in the First World War at Gallipoli and in Palestine, came from generations of East Anglian farmers and farm workers. His London-born mother, Matilda (née Elkins), had worked as a Voluntary Aid Detachment nurse during the war and passed on to her son her passion for books. Blythe could remember as a child seeing the sugar beet being farmed by men in army greatcoats and puttees.

He was educated at St Peter's and St Gregory's school in Sudbury, Suffolk, and grew up exploring churches, architecture, plants and books. He left school at 14 but was, he said, "a chronic reader", immersing himself in French literature and writing poetry.

== Literary career ==
=== Early cultural connections ===
Blythe briefly served during the Second World War. Considered unfit for service by his superiors, he returned to East Anglia and spent the ten years up to 1954 working as a reference librarian in Colchester, where he founded the Colchester Literary Society. Through his work at the library he met Christine Nash when she was looking for the score of Idomeneo. She introduced Blythe to her husband, the artist John Nash, inviting him to their house, Bottengoms Farm, near Wormingford on the border of Essex and Suffolk, which he first visited in 1947. She later encouraged his ambitions to be a writer, finding him a small house on the Suffolk coast near Aldeburgh.

Blythe lived briefly at Aldeburgh on the Suffolk coast (as recalled in his 2013 book The Time by the Sea) before moving to Debach. For three years in the late 1950s he worked for Benjamin Britten at the Aldeburgh Festival, editing programmes and doing pieces of translation. He met E. M. Forster, was briefly involved with Patricia Highsmith, spent time with the Nashes, and was part of the Bohemian world associated with the artists of the East Anglian School of Painting and Drawing at Benton End near Hadleigh, run by Cedric Morris and Arthur Lett-Haines. "I was a poet but I longed to be a painter like the rest of them," Blythe told The Guardian. "What I basically am is a listener and a watcher. I absorb, without asking questions, but I don't forget things, and I was inspired by a lot of these people because they worked so hard and didn't make a fuss. They just lived their lives in a very independent and disciplined way."

=== Writing ===
In 1960 Blythe published his first book, A Treasonable Growth, a novel set in the Suffolk countryside. The Age of Illusion, a collection of essays exploring the social history of life in England between the wars, appeared in 1963. That book led to his being asked to edit a series of classics for the Penguin English Library, beginning with Jane Austen's Emma and continuing with work by William Hazlitt, Thomas Hardy and Henry James. There were short stories and book reviews, and Blythe later prepared a number of anthologies, including The Pleasure of Diaries (1989) and Private Words: Letters and Diaries from the Second World War (1991).

In 1969 he published Akenfield: Portrait of an English Village, a fictionalised account of life in a Suffolk village from 1880 to 1966. Blythe had spent the winter of 1966–7 listening to three generations of his neighbours in the Suffolk villages of Charsfield and Debach, recording their views on education, class, welfare, religion, farming and death. 'Akenfield' is a made-up placename based partly upon Akenham (a small village just north of Ipswich) and probably partly on Charsfield. "When I wrote Akenfield," Blythe said, "I had no idea that anything particular was happening, but it was the last days of the old traditional rural life in Britain. And it vanished." The book is regarded as a classic of its type and was made into a film, Akenfield, by Peter Hall in 1974. When the film was aired it attracted fifteen million viewers; Blythe made an appearance as the vicar. "I actually haven't worked on this land but I've seen the land ploughed by horses," Blythe told The Guardian in 2011. "So I have a feeling and understanding in that respect – of its glory and bitterness."

In the 1970s Blythe nursed John Nash in ill health, leading him to publish his reflections on old age in 1979 in The View in Winter. In 1977 Blythe inherited Bottengoms Farm from Nash, who had bought the Elizabethan yeoman's house in 1944. He later published a book, First Friends (1999), based on, and quoting from, a trunk of letters he found in the house that recorded the friendship between the Nash brothers, John's future wife, Christine Külenthal, and the artist Dora Carrington.

His life at Bottengoms and the landscape around his home became the subject of Blythe's long-running column, "Word from Wormingford", in the Church Times from 1993 to 2017. These meditative reflections on literature, history, the Church of England and the natural world were subsequently collected together in books including A Parish Year (1998) and A Year at Bottengoms Farm (2006). A compilation of his work, Aftermath: Selected Writings 1960–2010, appeared in 2010.

A biography of Blythe by Ian Collins, entitled Blythe Spirit: The Remarkable Life of Ronald Blythe, was published by John Murray in 2024.

== Later life and death ==
Blythe never married. He continued to live and work at Bottengoms Farm in Wormingford until his death, following the opinion expressed in The View in Winter that the elderly should remain in their own homes whenever possible. He never learned to drive and did not use a computer.

He turned 100 on 6 November 2022 and died at his home just over two months later, on 14 January 2023. His grave lies in St Andrew’s Churchyard in Wormingford, Essex.

Blythe bequeathed his farmhouse, Bottengoms, to the Essex Wildlife Trust, which intends to use it as a conservation site, as well as a centre for education and art. His personal archive, including notebooks, index cards and research notes for Akenfield, was acquired by the British Library.

== Other positions ==
Blythe was a lay reader in the Church of England and a lay canon at St Edmundsbury Cathedral in Bury St Edmunds. He was a fellow of the Royal Society of Literature from 1970 and was president of the John Clare Society from its foundation. His book, At Helpston, is a series of essays on the poet John Clare.

== Recognition ==
=== Awards ===
In 2006 Blythe was awarded a Benson Medal for lifelong achievement by the Royal Society of Literature, and in 2015 he received an honorary degree from the University of Suffolk.

He was appointed Commander of the Order of the British Empire (CBE) in the 2017 Birthday Honours for services to literature.

=== Portraits ===
The National Portrait Gallery has two portraits of Blythe, a 2005 C-type print by Mark Gerson and a 1990 bromide print by Lucinda Douglas-Menzies. A 2014 terracotta head by Jon Edgar is featured in his 2015 collection of poems Decadal.

== Bibliography ==
Blythe's works as an author and an editor include the following:

=== Works as author ===
- A Treasonable Growth (MacGibbon & Kee, 1960) - fiction
- Immediate Possession and other stories (MacGibbon & Kee, 1961) - fiction
- The Age of Illusion: England in the Twenties and Thirties, 1919-1940 (Hamish Hamilton, 1963) - republished by The Folio Society, 2015
- Akenfield: Portrait of an English Village (Allen Lane, 1969) - republished by The Folio Society, 2002
- The View in Winter: Reflections on Old Age (Allen Lane, 1979)
- From the Headlands (Chatto & Windus, 1982)
- The Stories of Ronald Blythe (Chatto & Windus/Hogarth Press, 1985)
- Divine Landscapes: A Pilgrimage through Britain's Sacred Places (Viking, 1986) - with photos by Edwin Smith
- England: The Four Seasons (Pavilion Books, 1993) - photos by Michael Busselle
- Word from Wormingford: A Parish Year (Viking, 1997)
- Going to Meet George and other outings (Long Barn Books, 1999)
- First Friends: Paul and Bunty, John and Christine - and Carrington (Viking, 1999)
- Talking About John Clare (Trent Editions, 1999)
- Out of the Valley: Another Year at Wormingford (Viking, 2000)
- The Circling Year: Perspectives from a Country Parish (Canterbury Press, 2001) - with Robin Tanner
- Talking to the Neighbours: Conversations from a Country Church (Canterbury Press, 2002) - illustrated by Mary Newcomb
- A Country Boy. Seven Short Stories (Tern Press, 2004) - with Nicholas Parry
- The Assassin (Black Dog Books, 2004) - fiction
- Borderland: Continuity and Change in the Countryside (Black Dog Books, 2005 & Canterbury Press, 2007)
- The Writer's Day-Book (Trent Editions, 2006)
- A Year at Bottengoms Farm (Canterbury Press, 2006)
- Field Work: Selected Essays (Black Dog Books, 2007)
- River Diary (Canterbury Press, 2008)
- Outsiders: A Book of Garden Friends (Black Dog Books, 2008)
- The Bookman's Tale (Canterbury Press, 2009)
- Aftermath: Selected Writings 1960-2010 (Black Dog Books, 2010)
- At Helpston: Meetings with John Clare (Black Dog Books, 2011)
- At the Yeoman's House (Enitharmon Press, 2011)
- Village Hours (Canterbury Press, 2012)
- Under a Broad Sky (Canterbury Press, 2013)
- The Time by the Sea: Aldeburgh 1955-58 (Faber & Faber, 2013)
- Decadal (Enitharmon Press, 2014) - poetry
- In the Artist's Garden: A Journal from Wormingford (Canterbury Press, 2015)
- Stour Seasons: A Wormingford Book of Days (Canterbury Press, 2016)
- Forever Wormingford (Canterbury Press, 2017)
- Next to Nature: A Lifetime in the English Countryside (John Murray, 2022) - introduction by Richard Mabey

=== Works as editor ===
- Emma by Jane Austen (Penguin, 1966) - Penguin Classics edition
- Components of the Scene: Stories, Poems, and Essays of the Second World War (Penguin, 1966) - republished as Writing in a War: Stories, Poems, and Essays of the Second World War (Penguin, 1982)
- Selected Writings by William Hazlitt (Penguin, 1970) - Penguin Classics edition
- Aldeburgh Anthology (Snape Maltings Foundation/Faber Music, 1972)
- Far From the Madding Crowd by Thomas Hardy (Penguin, 1979) - Penguin Classics edition
- Places: An Anthology of Britain (Oxford University Press, 1981)
- The Awkward Age by Henry James (Penguin, 1987) - Penguin Classics edition
- Each Returning Day: The Pleasure of Diaries (Viking, 1989) - published in USA as The Pleasures of Diaries: Four Centuries of Private Writing (Pantheon, 1989)
- Private Words: Letters and Diaries from the Second World War (Viking, 1991)
