= Maggi Hambling =

British artist (born 1945)

Maggi Hambling CBE
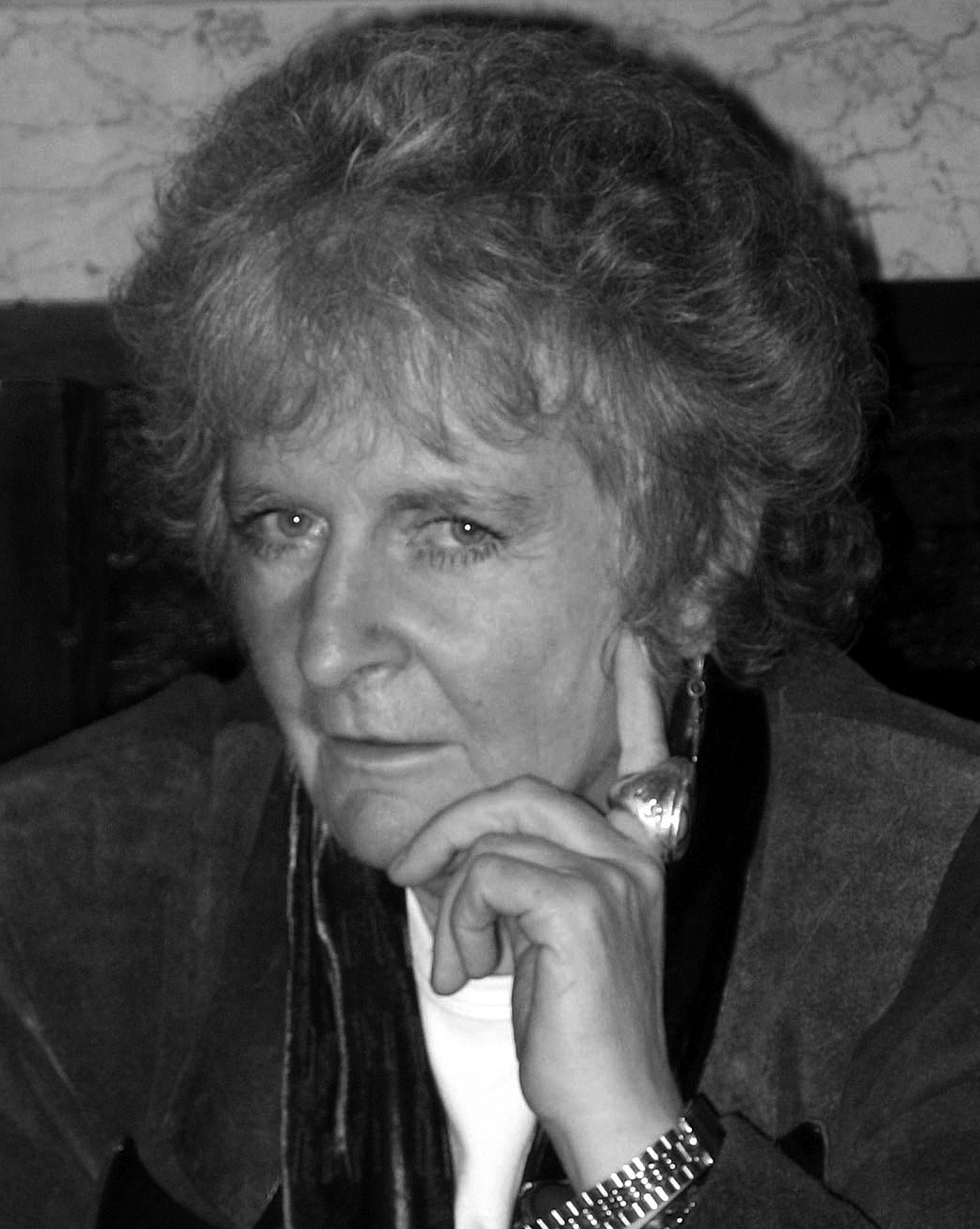
- Hambling in 2006
- Born: 23 October 1945 (age 81); Sudbury, England
- Education: Amberfield School, Nacton; East Anglian School of Painting and Drawing; Ipswich School of Art; Camberwell College of Arts; Slade School of Art, UCL
- Known for: painting, sculpture
- Awards: Jerwood Painting Prize, 1995; OBE, 1995; CBE, 2010; Suffolk Medal, 2022
- Website: maggihambling.com

Margaret J. Hambling CBE (born 23 October 1945) is a British artist. Though principally a painter, her best-known public works are the sculptures A Conversation with Oscar Wilde and A Sculpture for Mary Wollstonecraft in London, and the 4-metre-high steel Scallop on Aldeburgh beach. All three works have attracted controversy.

== Early life and education ==
Maggi Hambling was born in Sudbury, Suffolk to Barclays bank cashier and local politician Harry Smyth Leonard Hambling (1902–1998) and Marjorie (née Harris, 1907–1988). Her parents married in 1933. She had two siblings: a sister, Ann, who was 11 years older, and a brother, Roger, nine years older than Hambling. Her brother had wanted a younger brother and ignored the fact that his new sibling was female and taught her carpentry and "how to wring a chicken's neck." Hambling was close to her mother, who taught ballroom dancing and took Hambling along to be her partner. It was from her father that she inherited her artistic skills. She was not as close to him as she was to her mother but when her father retired at the age of 60, she gave him some oil paints and discovered that he had a knack for painting; he went on to have seven well-received solo shows, and exhibited twice at the Royal Academy Summer Exhibition; his paintings were owned by George Melly, Delia Smith, and Paul Bailey, among others, and are held in public and private collections including in America and Australia.

Hambling first studied art under Yvonne Drewry at the Amberfield School in Nacton. She then studied at the East Anglian School of Painting and Drawing from 1960 under Cedric Morris and Lett Haines at Benton End, then at Ipswich School of Art (1962–64), Camberwell (1964–67), and finally the Slade School of Art (1967–69) at UCL, graduating in 1969.

== Career ==
Hambling is known for her intricate land and seascapes, including a celebrated series of North Sea paintings. Among her portraits, several works are held by the National Portrait Gallery, London.

In 1980, Hambling became the first artist in residence at the National Gallery, after which she produced a series of portraits of the comedian Max Wall. Wall responded to Hambling's request to paint him with a letter saying: "Re: painting little me, I am flattered indeed – what colour?" She has taught at Wimbledon School of Art.

Women feature prominently in her portrait series. Hambling was commissioned by the National Portrait Gallery to paint Professor Dorothy Hodgkin in 1985. The portrait features Hodgkin at a desk with four hands, all engaged in different tasks. Her wider body of work is held in many public collections including the British Museum, Tate Collection, National Gallery, Scottish National Gallery of Modern Art, and the Victoria and Albert Museum.

Hambling is known for painting the dead, including portraits of her parents and Henrietta Moraes in their coffins, saying that she "found it rather therapeutic to go on painting them after death". George Melly was the subject of a series that documented his approach to death, and said she would go down in history as "Maggi 'coffin' Hambling". Some of her recent work is spurred through anger—for the destruction of the planet, about politics, for social issues. She has also said that "Making a work of art is making a work of love."

In 2013, she exhibited at Snape during the Aldeburgh Festival, and a solo exhibition was held at the Hermitage, St Petersburg.

Hambling is a patron of Paintings in Hospitals, a charity that provides art for health and social care in England, Wales and Northern Ireland.

== Works of public sculpture ==
=== Memorial to Oscar Wilde ===
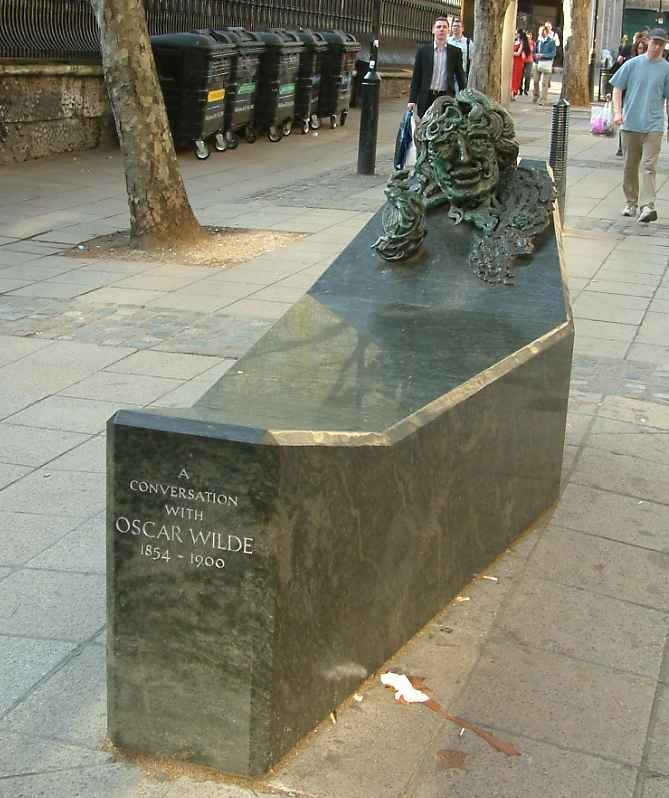
A Conversation with Oscar Wilde, central London.

Hambling's 1998 outdoor sculpture at Charing Cross in central London as a memorial to dramatist Oscar Wilde, the first public monument to him outside his native Ireland.

Derek Jarman first suggested a memorial in the 1980s and a committee chaired by Sir Jeremy Isaacs including actors Dame Judi Dench and Sir Ian McKellen and the poet Seamus Heaney, raised the money and commissioned Hambling. Her design features Wilde rising from a polished green granite coffin holding a cigarette. The coffin is intended to serve as a public bench rather than the more conventional stone plinth, hence Hambling's name for the memorial A Conversation with Oscar Wilde, as visitors sit next to the writer's effigy. The work bears a quotation from Lady Windermere's Fan: "We are all in the gutter but some of us are looking at the stars."

Some critics were severe in their criticism of the work, but supporters said it was well-loved by the public. The chief art critic of The Independent wrote that ultimately the sculpture was not about Wilde or the viewing public, but a reflection of Hambling herself. The cigarette was repeatedly removed, "the most frequent act of vandalism/veneration to a public statue in London", and is now no longer replaced.

=== Memorial to Benjamin Britten ===
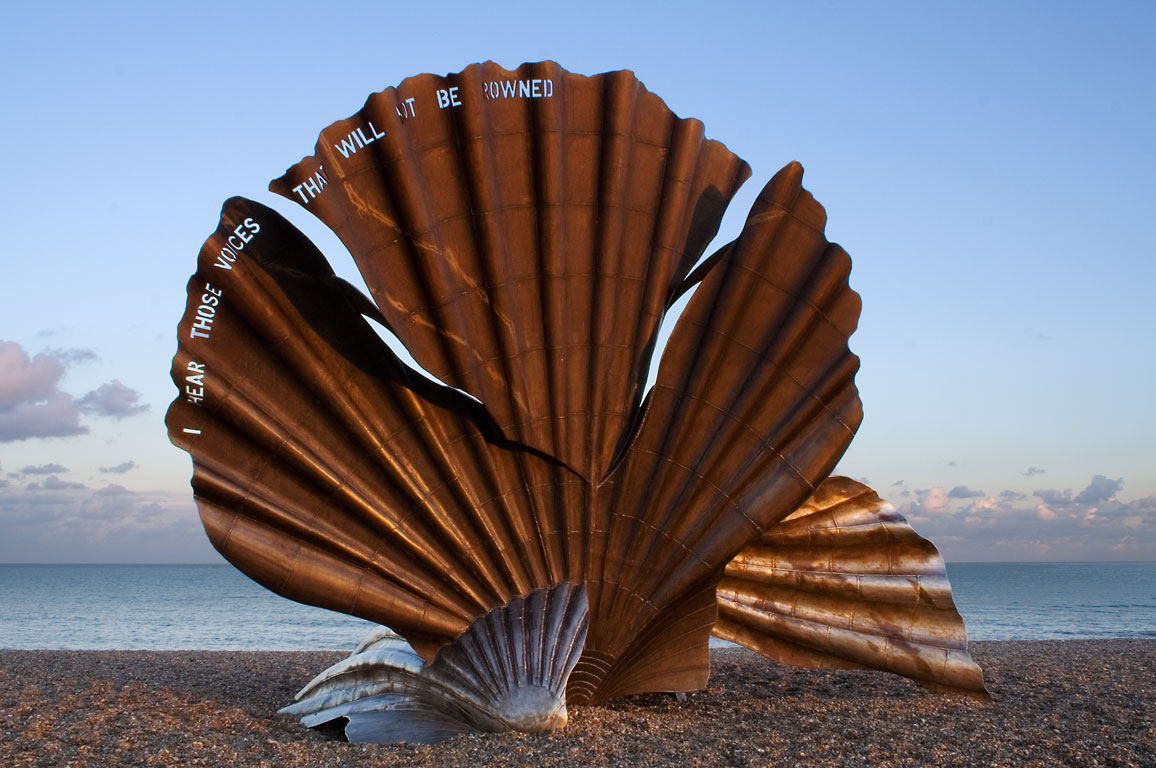
Hambling's Scallop stands on the north end of Aldeburgh beach.

Scallop (2003) celebrates the composer Benjamin Britten and stands on the beach outside Aldeburgh, Suffolk, near Britten's homes and not far from Hambling's village. The four-metre-high (13 ft) cast stainless steel sculpture is in the form of the two fractured halves of a scallop shell, etched with the quotation from Britten's opera Peter Grimes: "I hear those voices that will not be drowned."

Hambling describes Scallop as a conversation with the sea: "An important part of my concept is that at the centre of the sculpture, where the sound of the waves and the winds are focused, a visitor may sit and contemplate the mysterious power of the sea."

Opponents claimed the sculpture ruined a previously unspoilt stretch of beach. A local petition against it attracted several hundred signatures, and it has been vandalised a number of times.

For this work, Hambling received the 2006 Marsh Award for Excellence in Public Sculpture.

=== Memorial to Mary Wollstonecraft ===
In May 2018, Hambling was chosen to create a statue commemorating Mary Wollstonecraft, the “foremother of feminism”. The Mary on the Green campaign has been working to erect a permanent memorial to the philosopher and author of A Vindication of the Rights of Woman since 2011. It chose Hambling for the sculpture unanimously. Hambling's design features a figure – described as an everywoman – emerging out of organic matter. It is inspired by Wollstonecraft's claim to be “the first of a new genus”. Wollstonecraft's famous quotation, “I do not wish women to have power over men but over themselves”, appears on the plinth.

The work, A Sculpture for Mary Wollstonecraft, was unveiled in Newington Green, north London, on 10 November 2020, across from the Newington Green Unitarian Church, where Wollstonecraft worshipped. Newington Green is known as the birthplace of feminism because of Wollstonecraft's roots there and is where Wollstonecraft moved her school for girls from Islington in 1784.

The sculpture sparked a backlash. British feminist author Caroline Criado Perez called it "catastrophically wrong" and said, "I honestly feel that actually this representation is insulting to [Wollstonecraft]. I can't see her feeling happy to be represented by this naked, perfectly formed wet dream of a woman." Hambling defended her decision, saying that "clothes would have restricted her. Statues in historic costumes look like they belong to history because of their clothes. It's crucial that she is 'now'." The design of the statue was in deliberate opposition to "traditional male heroic statuary" of the Victorian era, the campaigners behind it describing the figure as someone who has "evolved organically from, is supported by, and does not forget, all her predecessors."

== Awards ==
In 1995, she was awarded the Jerwood Painting Prize (with Patrick Caulfield). In the same year, she was awarded an OBE for her services to painting. In 2005, she received the Marsh Award for Excellence in Public Sculpture for Scallop.

In the 2010 New Year Honours, she was awarded a CBE for services to art.

In 2022, she was awarded the Suffolk Medal which she had previously designed.

== Personal life ==
Hambling described herself as "lesbionic" (her adjective). She formed a relationship with a fellow artist, Victoria Dennistoun who was married to John Lawrence, 2nd Baron Oaksey. The Oaksey's "marriage broke up in unhappily public fashion in the mid-1980s". Tory Lawrence and Hambling have been together ever since, living in a cottage near Saxmundham in Suffolk. The house was left to Hambling by Lady Gwatkin (Isolen Mary June Wilson), widow of Norman Gwatkin.

For the last year of the life of Henrietta Moraes, she and Hambling were in a relationship. The artists' model, Soho muse, and memoirist died in 1999, and Hambling produced a posthumous volume of charcoal portraits of her.

She once said that she would not speak during a television show if she could not smoke. The cameraperson refused to work with someone who did; Hambling stuck to her word and did not speak.

== Political views ==
Hambling gave up smoking in 2004 and was involved in the campaign against the total ban on smoking in public places in England which took effect on 1 July 2007. Speaking at a news conference at the House of Commons on 7 February 2007, she said: "I wholeheartedly support the campaign against a ban on smoking in public places. Just because I gave up at 59, other people may choose not to. There must be freedom of choice, something that is fast disappearing in this so-called free country." She took up smoking again on her 65th birthday but only 'the ones that smell of toothpaste'.

In August 2014, Hambling was one of 200 public figures who were signatories to a letter to The Guardian opposing Scottish independence in the run-up to September's referendum on that issue.

In 2024, she donated £85,000 to the Labour Party.
