= Bettina Shaw-Lawrence =

English painter

- Portrait of Bettina Shaw-Lawrence by David Kentish, undated
- Born: 29 July 1921; London, England
- Died: 12 September 2018 (aged 97); Italy
- Education: Fernand Léger, Sir Cedric Morris
- Known for: Figurative art
- Movement: Magic realism, neo-romantic

Bettina Shaw-Lawrence (29 July 1921 – 12 September 2018), also known as Betty Shaw-Lawrence, was an English figurative artist. Shaw studied painting and drawing under Fernand Léger, Cedric Morris and Arthur Lett-Haines, though she was mainly self-taught and worked professionally until the early 1980s.

== Biography ==
Shaw-Lawrence was born in London in July 1921. Her work is figurative and expresses itself mainly through oil paintings. Her other favourite mediums are black and white or coloured ink drawings. She is also a book illustrator, "widely known as a portrait painter", and a sculptor. Her works are represented in private collections but recently her pen and ink drawing of the poet David Gascoyne has been acquired by the National Portrait Gallery in London. From 1946 onwards, the artist had several solo and group exhibitions in galleries of contemporary Art in London, Rome and New York.

The artist attended, before the outbreak of the Second World War, drawing classes under Fernand Léger and studied sculpture with Ossip Zadkine in Paris. During those formative years David Gascoyne, the Surrealist poet, was her mentor. On her return to London in September, 1939, Shaw-Lawrence met David Kentish and Lucian Freud both students at Cedric Morris and Arthur Lett-Haines' East Anglian School of Painting and Drawing. This encounter enabled her to spend the summer of 1940 studying under the artist Cedric Morris and though she returned to the School at Benton End near Hadleigh, Suffolk, for short spells during the war, Shaw-Lawrence mainly painted in Richmond-upon-Thames.

In the aftermath of the Second World War, Bettina travelled to the Continent. Countries such as Spain or France inspired her works and were subsequently exhibited at The Leicester Galleries and the Hanover Gallery. In 1958 Shaw-Lawrence left England to move to Italy where her oils on canvas became more luminous and serene though her work " might be sets for very sophisticated doll dramas". Her paintings were steeped in "a world of crystalline beauty, alive and real", a world devoid of intruders "because of this power of hers to purify reality and restore it to innocence".

Shaw-Lawrence died in Italy in September 2018 at the age of 97.

== Career ==
=== Solo exhibitions ===
1947 - The Leicester Galleries - London. This first exhibition of the artist was announced by The Times.

Its catalogue comprised: 16 oil paintings and 12 drawings (ink and gouache, ink and water-colour, coloured inks and chalk as well as one pastel), most of which depicted landscapes, flowers or still-lives with the exception of one portrait of David Gascoyne.

In 1948, The Penguin New Writing n°33 edited by John Lehmann published two of her works from this exhibition: 'Richmond Bridge' (oil) and 'Boy with a Donkey' (coloured inks).

1953 - Hanover Gallery - London. The artist's second show was also announced in The Times. The catalogue listed 18 oil paintings.

1963 - Bodley Gallery - 223 East 60th Street, New York. April 15, 1963

The exhibition catalogue comprises 40 "oil on canvas", all pertaining to the artist's Italian period. Her exhibition was announced by ARTnews.

1975 - Wivenhoe Arts Club - Wivenhoe (Essex)

"An exhibition of paintings and drawings by Bettina Shaw-Lawrence opened at the club on Saturday evening and among the guests was Mr Arthur Lett-Haines, one of the leaders of the East Anglian School of Painting and Drawing where Miss Shaw-Lawrence studied many years ago. There are 39 works in the exhibition... which will remain open for the next three weeks".

=== Further exhibits ===
The artist's first exhibits in London included the Reid & Lefèvre Gallery and the Léger Gallery. These were followed in 1955 by the Arthur Jeffress Gallery in London in collaboration with the Galerie Charpentier in Paris. On this occasion, her portrait entitled 'Portrait with a Rose' was selected for the cover of The Listener to announce a BBC radio programme on the trompe-l'œil style of art, dated February 3, 1955.

The Bodley catalogue dated 1963, confirms that when Bettina Shaw-Lawrence lived in Rome, Italy (1959–1967) her works were exhibited " at the Obelisco and Gallery 88".

In 1985, Bettina Shaw-Lawrence took part in the exhibition entitled 'The Benton End Circle' which was held at Bury St Edmunds Art gallery in Bury St Edmunds (Suffolk). On that occasion the artist sold a pen and ink drawing of Lucian Freud posing in the nude for the students of the East Anglian School of Painting and Drawing at Benton End in the early 1940s (see external link). This was her last exhibition and it had taken place in a gallery located close to Benton End where she had always longed to be during the war years and would "always remember the lovely times I've had down there".

=== Portrait artist ===
Among the painter's sitters were the designer Jean Muir, her husband Harry Leuckert, David Kentish, his sister, the actress Elizabeth Kentish, the poet David Gascoyne, and the journalist and writer Paul Johnson (writer).

=== Book illustrator ===
1946 - William Miller Abrahams. 'Interval in Carolina'. Jacket designed by Bettina Shaw-Lawrence. London: Editions Poetry London. OCLC 7840602

1949 - Shaw-Lawrence, Bettina and Fassam, Thomas. 'An Herbarium For The Fair: Being a Book of Common Herbs with Etchings by Betty Shaw-Lawrence'.London: The Hand & Flower Press.

1957 - Jean Cocteau.'The Impostor'. Translated from the French by Dorothy Williams. Jacket designed by Bettina Shaw-Lawrence. London: Peter Owen Limited.

1972 - Shaw-Lawrence, Bettina. Festschrift for KFB (Katherine Falley Bennett). London: The Lyrebird Press, Micro-dot-Book. p. 167 and a double page drawing p. 140 - 141. OCLC 1121430

1979 - Shaw-Lawrence, Bettina, Durrell, Lawrence.'Apple Grammar'. London: Poetry London/Apple Magazine, vol.1 N°1.p. 79. OCLC 6257472

1989 - Shaw-Lawrence, Bettina. Tambimuttu Bridge Between Two Worlds. London: Peter Owen Publishers. p. 236. OCLC 25026573
