= Central School of Art and Design =

Former art college in London

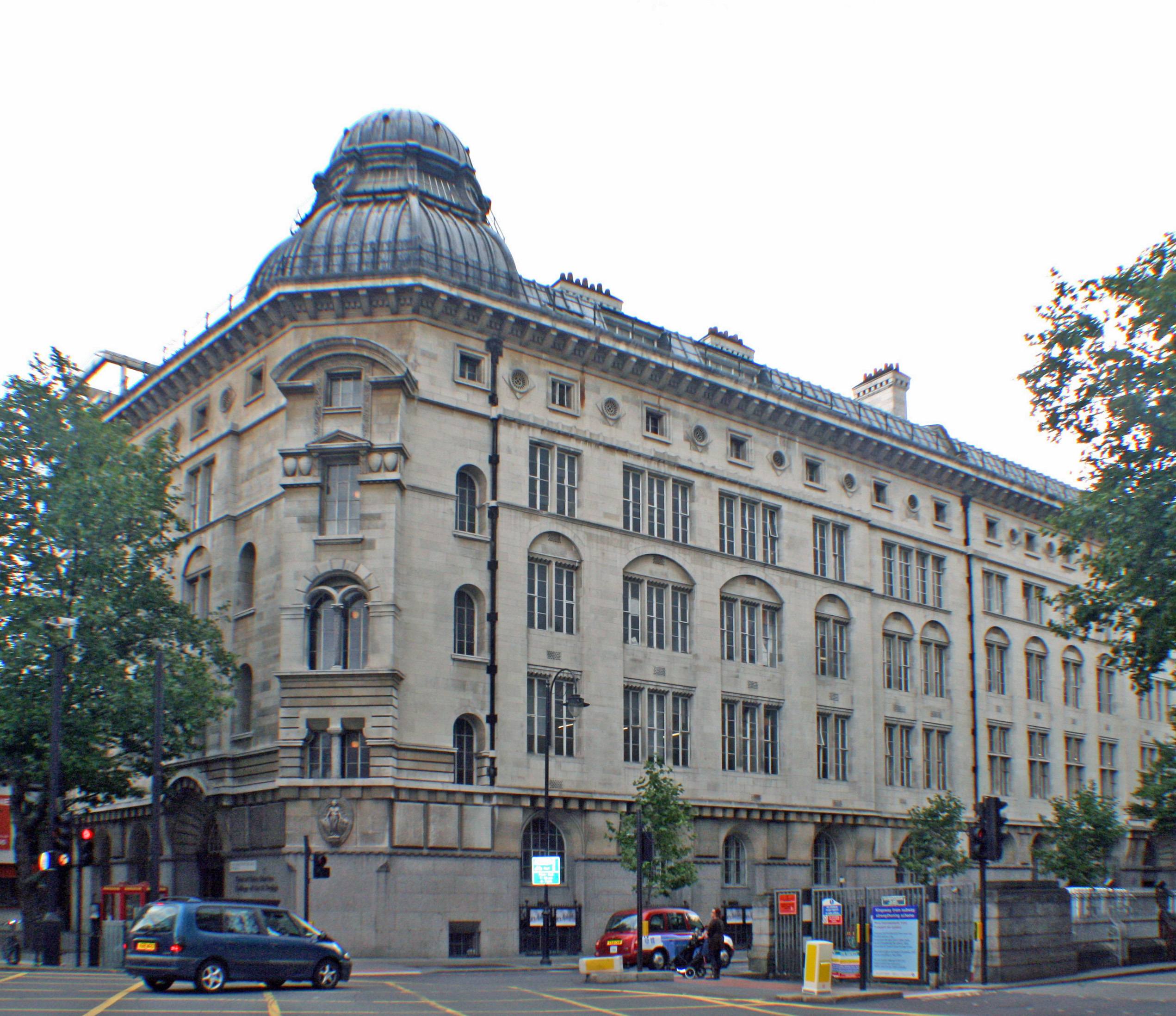
- The Central School of Arts and Crafts, later Central School of Art and Design, in Southampton Row
- Type: Academy of art and design
- Active: 1896–1989
- Location: London, United Kingdom; 51.5189°N 0.1207°W

The Central School of Art and Design was a school of fine and applied arts in London, England. It offered foundation and degree level courses. It was established in 1896 by the London County Council as the Central School of Arts and Crafts.

== History ==
The Central School of Arts and Crafts was established in 1896 by the London County Council. It grew directly from the Arts and Crafts movement of William Morris and John Ruskin. The first principal – from 1896 to 1900 as co-principal with George Frampton – was the architect William Richard Lethaby, from 1896 until 1912; a blue plaque in his memory was erected in 1957. He was succeeded in 1912 by Fred Burridge.

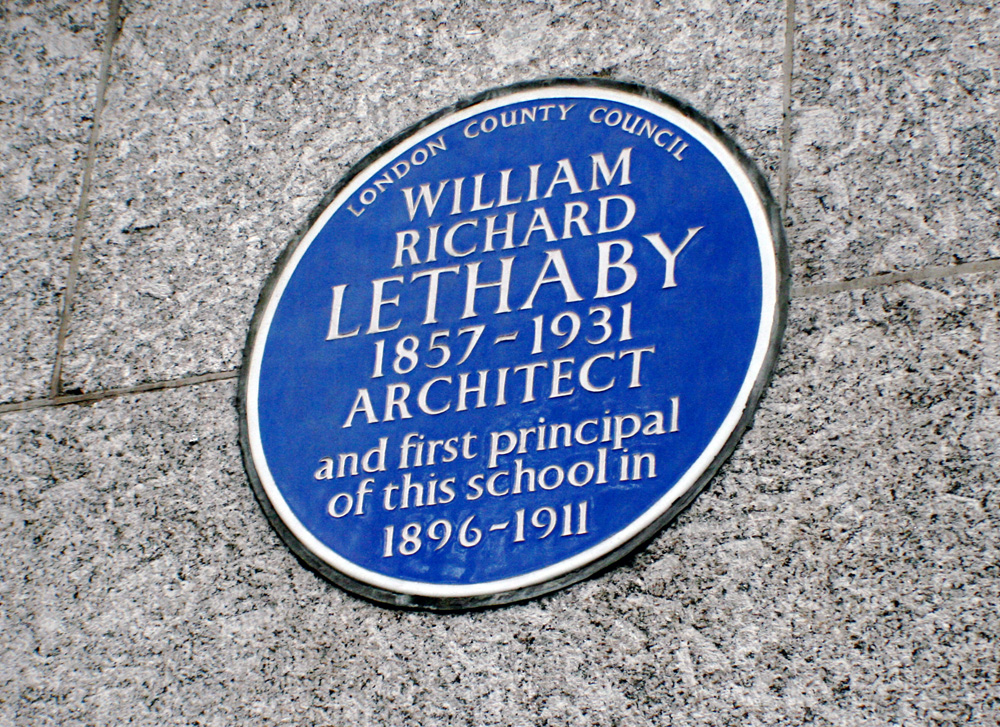
The blue plaque in memory of William Richard Lethaby, placed on the Southampton Row façade of the Central School of Arts and Crafts building in 1957

The school was at first housed in Morley Hall, rented from the Regent Street Polytechnic. In 1908 it moved to purpose-built premises in Southampton Row, in the London Borough of Camden. In the same year the Royal Female School of Art, established in 1842, was merged into the school.

The Central School of Arts and Crafts was renamed the Central School of Art and Design on 1 May 1966. It became part of the London Institute in 1986, and in 1989 merged with Saint Martin's School of Art to form Central Saint Martins College of Arts and Design.

== Alumni ==
The alumni of the Central School of Art and Design include:

- Terence Conran, designer and writer, founder of Habitat
- Lucian Freud, painter
- Eric Gill, artist and typographer
- Kathleen Hale, artist and creator of Orlando the Marmalade Cat
- Ley Kenyon, war artist and book illustrator
- David Hicks, interior decorator and designer
- Mike Leigh, film director, theatre director, writer
- Bill Moggridge, designer of the first laptop computer
- Victor Pasmore, abstract artist
- Vivian Stanshall, musician, of the Bonzo Dog Doo-Dah Band
- Joe Strummer, musician, of The Clash
- Esme Young, fashion designer and television presenter
