= East Anglian School of Painting and Drawing =

Former art school in England

Coordinates: 52.0373°N 0.9585°E

The East Anglian School of Painting and Drawing was an art learning environment established by Cedric Morris and Arthur Lett-Haines in East Anglia in 1937. It was run on very idiosyncratic lines based upon the "free rein" approach that was then current in French academies. It had a great influence on many Suffolk artists and made an important contribution to art teaching in the east of England for forty years.

== Foundation ==
The school was founded by Morris and Lett-Haines on 12 April 1937 in an old house in the centre of Dedham, Essex. In addition to the proprietors, there was a third teacher- Ian Brinkworth- a secretary, model and one student when it opened. By December 1937 there were 60 students and the school held its first exhibition. The school was described in a prospectus as "an oasis of decency for artists outside the system". Lett-Haines taught theory, whereas Morris taught by encouragement and example. Lucian Freud was among the earliest students joining at the age of seventeen in 1939.

== Benton End ==
In July 1939, the Dedham building was destroyed by fire. The traditionalist local artist Alfred Munnings had himself driven round its smoking ruins gloating at the destruction of what he saw as a dangerously radical tendency. Undeterred, Morris told the students to draw the burnt-out wreck and arranged emergency facilities in a local pub. Towards the end of 1939 Lett and Cedric discovered Benton End, a rambling 16th-century house with gardens, on the outskirts of Hadleigh in Suffolk. This allowed the artists to live and run their school and also accommodate their students in one place. Previously Morris and Lett-Haines had lived at Pound Farm in Suffolk, and students were dispersed about in lodgings.

Lett was the 'father' of the community, in charge of its daily administration and as an enthusiastic cook produced two meals a day. Morris carried on painting and became an internationally renowned plantsman. The school's peak time was in the 1940s and 1950s, when Benton End was a "powerhouse of art and literature, good food and lively conversation". Ronald Blythe described it as "robust and coarse, and exquisite and tentative all at once. Rough and ready and fine mannered. Also faintly dangerous."

Benton End was run on very idiosyncratic lines without any formal teaching. Rather, it was an environment in which artists could explore their potential. It was based upon the 'free rein' approach of French academies which both artists had enjoyed while living in Paris in the 1920s. Instruction was kept to a minimum, the atmosphere being more that of a family of artists striving for a common cause.

== Students ==
In addition to Lucian Freud, students of the school include Maggi Hambling, David Kentish, Bettina Shaw-Lawrence, Lucy Harwood, Joan Warburton, Naomi Stoney, Glyn Morgan, Valerie Thornton and top legal scholar Bernard Brown.
