= Cedric Morris =

Welsh artist (1889–1982)

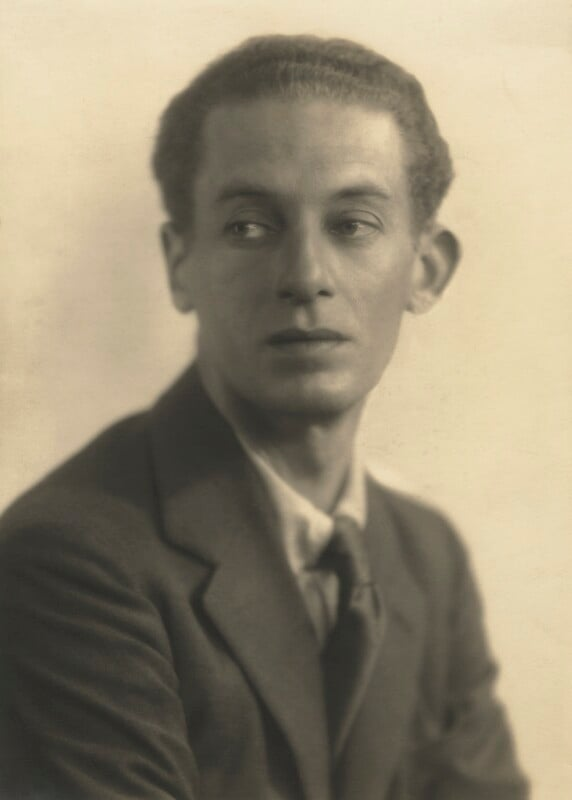
- Morris, c. 1920
- Born: 11 December 1889; Sketty, Swansea, UK
- Died: 8 February 1982 (aged 92); Hadleigh, Suffolk, UK
- Resting place: Friars Road Cemetery, Hadleigh
- Education: St Cyprian's School, Charterhouse School, Académie Colarossi
- Partner: Arthur Lett-Haines

Sir Cedric Lockwood Morris, 9th Baronet (11 December 1889 – 8 February 1982) was a British artist, art teacher and plantsman. He was born in Swansea in South Wales, but worked mainly in East Anglia. As an artist he is best known for his portraits, flower paintings and landscapes.

== Early life ==
Cedric Lockwood Morris was born on 11 December 1889 in Sketty, Swansea, the son of George Lockwood Morris, industrialist and iron founder, and Wales rugby international, and his wife Wilhelmina (née Cory, see Cory baronets). He had two sisters – Muriel, who died in her teens, and Nancy (born in 1893). His mother had studied painting and was an accomplished needlewoman; on his father's side he was descended from Sir John Morris, 1st Baronet, whose sister Margaret married Noel Desenfans and helped him and his friend, Francis Bourgeois, to build up the collection now housed in the Dulwich Picture Gallery. Cedric was sent away to be educated, at St Cyprian's School, Eastbourne, and Charterhouse School in Godalming.

Having failed the entrance exams for an army commission, at the age of 17 he set out on a steamship to Canada, to work on a farm in the province of Ontario. After a succession of jobs, including as a dishwasher and bellboy in New York City, he returned to South Wales, and then entered the Royal College of Music, London, to study singing. But he gave up singing for painting, and went to Paris, where from April 1914 he studied at the Académie Delécluse in Montparnasse before the interruption of World War I.

During the war he joined the Artists' Rifles, but before embarking for France was declared medically unfit for action in consequence of the effects of a failed operation during his childhood. As an experienced horseman, however, he was allocated to the training of remounts at Lord Rosslyn's stables at Theale, Berkshire. He worked in the company of Alfred Munnings, under Cecil Aldin. He was discharged from this when the army took over the remounts in 1917.

== Cornwall, Paris and London ==
Morris went to Zennor in Cornwall, where he studied plants and painted water colours. There he became friendly with the painter Frances Hodgkins, whose portrait he painted. At the time of the Armistice with Germany in November 1918 he was in London, when he met the painter Arthur Lett-Haines. Morris and Lett-Haines fell in love and began a life-time relationship, and shortly afterwards Morris moved in with Lett-Haines and his second wife, Aimee. The trio planned to go to America, but in the event Aimee Lett-Haines left on her own, and the two men moved to Cornwall. They converted a row of cottages at Newlyn into a larger house and stayed there until the end of 1920, when they moved to Paris.

Paris was their base for the next five years, when they travelled extensively in Europe. Morris also studied at the Academies Moderne and La Grande Chaumiere. Morris had successful exhibitions in London in 1924 and 1926, and later in that year they settled back in Britain.

After staying with his sister Nancy Morris in Corfe, Morris and Lett-Haines found a studio in London at Great Ormond Street to which they moved in 1927. Morris became a member of the London Artists' Association and the Seven and Five Society, for which he was proposed by Winifred Nicholson and seconded by Ben Nicholson. He became especially friendly with the painter Christopher Wood, and renewed friendship with Frances Hodgkins. At the end of the 1920s Morris became involved with much commercial work designing textiles for Cresta Silks with Paul Nash and posters for Shell and BP.

== Country life ==
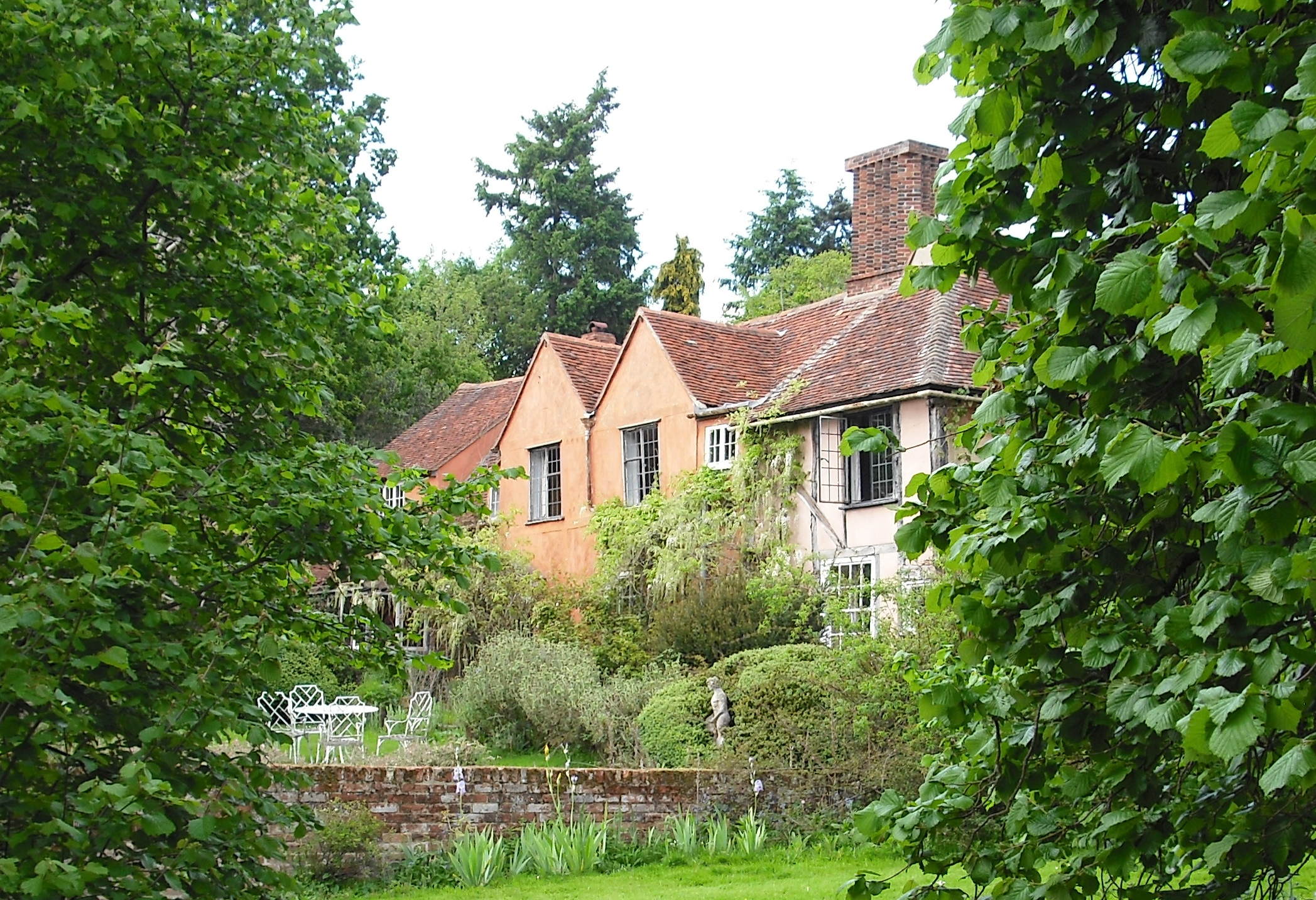
Pound Farm, Higham, Suffolk

Morris chose the country life to pursue his passion for horticulture. Early in 1929 Morris and his companion took the lease of Pound Farm, Higham, Suffolk, and in February 1930 they gave up the London studio.

In 1932 the owner of Pound Farm, Vivien Gribble, who was for a while a student, died and left it to Morris. Morris had resigned from the Seven and Five Society in 1930 and he resigned from the London Artists' Association in 1933. There were many visitors at Pound Farm, including Frances Hodgkins, Barbara Hepworth and John Skeaping. Joan Warburton who was a student described Pound Farm as a paradise, mainly because of the spectacular gardens which Morris developed. She was also impressed by their spectacular parties.

Morris often went painting in his native South Wales, and in 1935 at the time of the Depression was moved by the plight of the people of South Wales Valleys. He initiated a major touring exhibition of Welsh art in 1935, and was a regular teacher at Mary Horsfall's arts' centre at Merthyr Tydfil. In 1935 he painted two large flower murals on board the liner Queen Mary. In late 1937 Morris and Lett-Haines joined the Hadleigh Labour Party after attending a meeting addressed by Professor Catlin.

== East Anglian School of Painting and Drawing ==
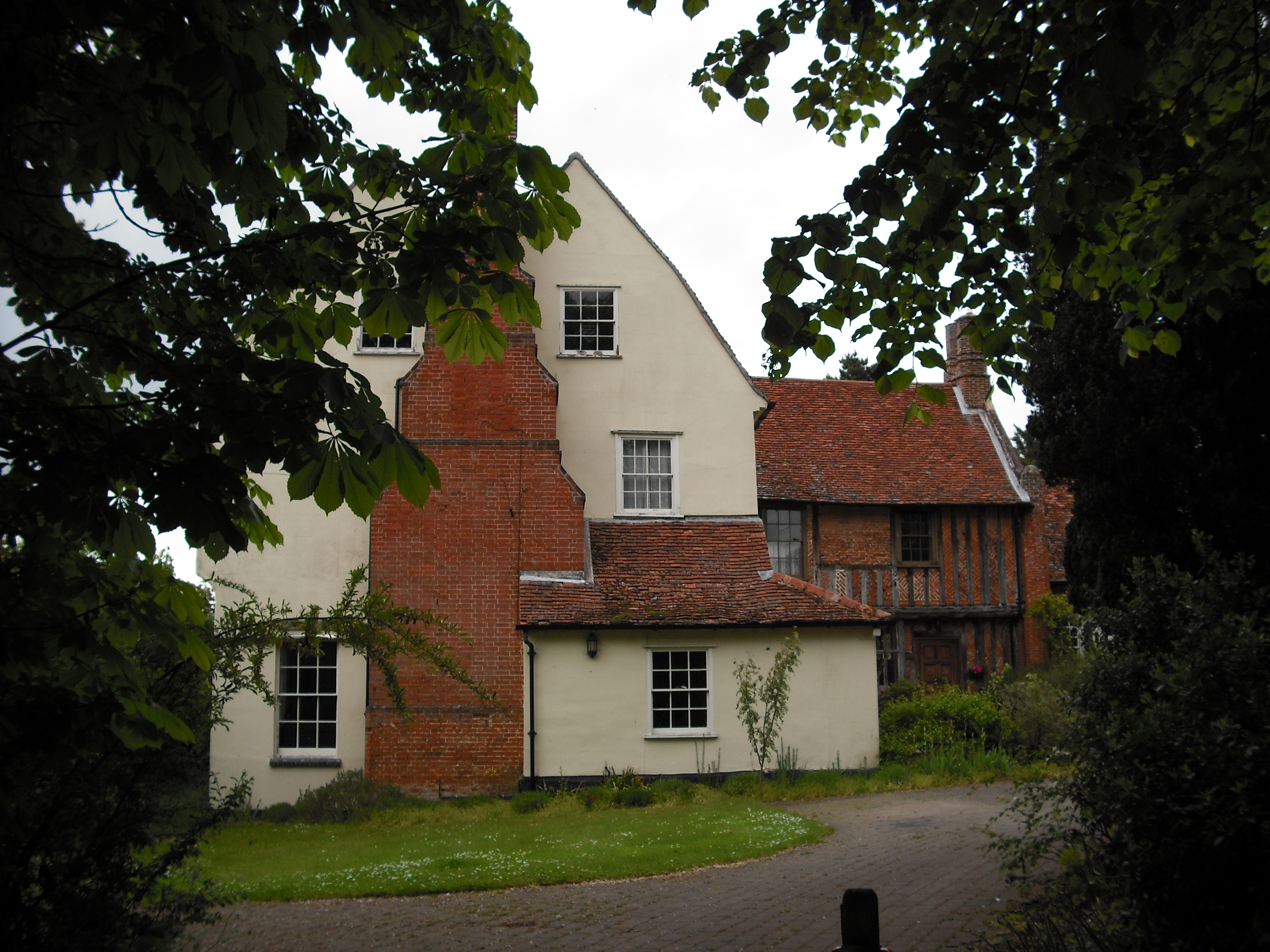
Benton End House, Hadleigh, Suffolk

Morris and Lett-Haines opened the East Anglian School of Painting and Drawing at Dedham in April 1937. Within a year they had 60 students. Lucian Freud was one of his most noted students. Other students include Maggi Hambling Waveney Frederick and Joan Warburton.

In 1939 the building at Dedham was destroyed by fire (with several of Morris's paintings also destroyed) to the conspicuous delight of Alfred Munnings. By the end of the year the school was re-established at Benton End. Benton End was a rambling 'Suffolk Pink' farmhouse on the outskirts of Hadleigh, set in 3 or 4 acres (1.6 ha) of orchard. Dating from the 16th century, the house is reputed to have been designed by Sir Peter Cheyney and since 1950 it has been Grade II* listed.

Morris was intolerant of cruelty to animals and at Benton End had a running feud with a local gamekeeper who shot cats and dogs – until the latter tripped over his shotgun and killed himself.

His housekeeper was Millie Hayes (née Gomersall, 1916–2001). She studied at Benton End under Morris and his 1936 portrait of her was displayed at The Minories Art Gallery, Colchester. In 1941 she exhibited the painting Landscape from the Garden at the Ipswich Art Club. Another painting Hadleigh was sold at auction by Christie's in 1997. Morris painted her portrait a second time in 1964 and she was a beneficiary under his will. She died at Ipswich in 2001 and a small commemorative headstone is located at the back of Morris's in Hadleigh cemetery.

== Horticulture and other interests ==
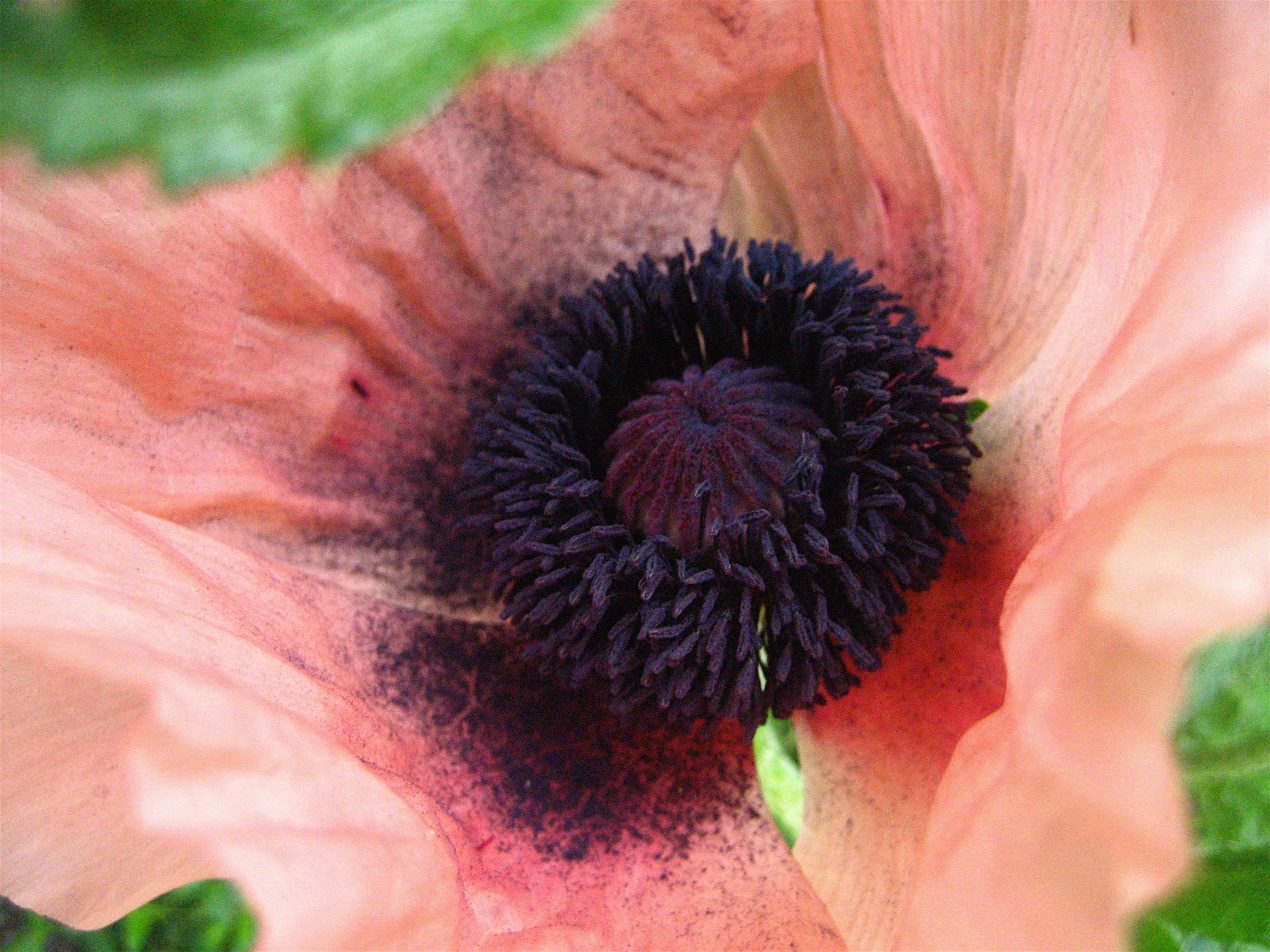
Papaver orientale 'Cedric Morris'

In addition to running the school, Morris indulged his passion for plants. He grew about 1,000 new Iris seedlings each year and opened Benton End to display his collection. He produced at least 90 named varieties, 45 of which were registered with the American Iris Society. Some were sold commercially and exhibited at the Chelsea Flower Show. Many of his named varieties carried the prefix "Benton", including 'Benton Menace' named after his cats, and 'Benton Rubeo', named for his pet macaw. He also used to walk the fields and hedgerows searching for softer colour variants of poppies. Morris's work as a horticulturalist resulted in a number of plants being named after him.

Morris bred birds as a hobby and his expertise informed his paintings of them. Discussing his Peregrine Falcons (1942), he explained he was attempting to "provoke a lively sympathy with the mood of the birds which ornithological exactitude may tend to destroy."

== Later life ==
In 1946, along with Henry Collins, Lett-Haines, John Nash and Roderic Barrett, Morris became one of the founders of Colchester Art Society and later the society's president.

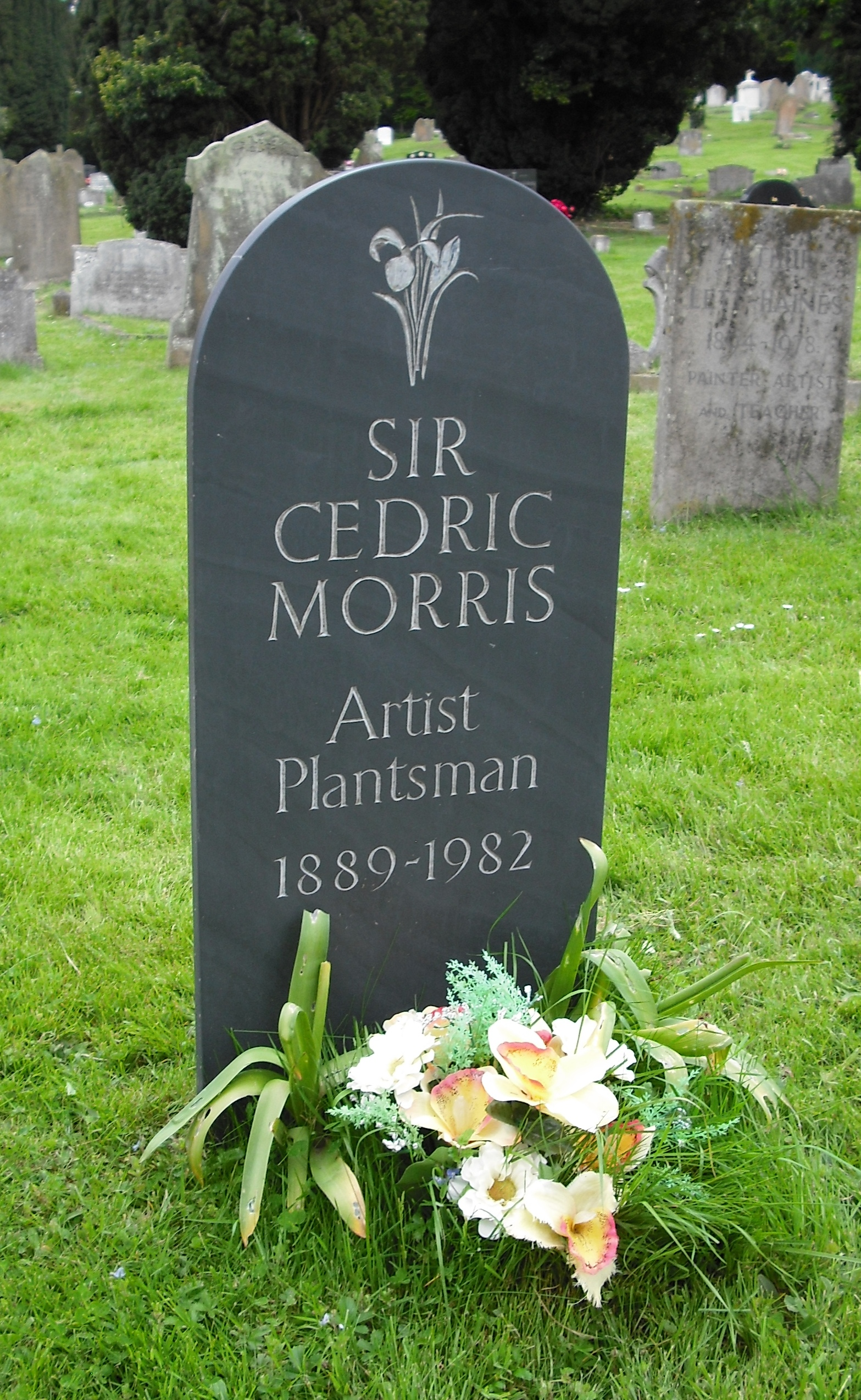
Morris's gravestone. Lett-Haines' grave behind it to right of photo, Friar's Road Cemetery, Hadleigh, Suffolk

In 1947 the Morris baronetcy came to his father from a distant cousin three months before his death and Cedric Morris succeeded his father in the same year to become the 9th baronet. He became a lecturer at the Royal College of Art in 1950. From about 1975 Morris virtually gave up painting because of failing eyesight.

He died on 8 February 1982. His former pupil, Maggi Hambling, visited him on the day before his death and afterwards drew a portrait of him. His grave, near that of Arthur Lett-Haines, in Friar's Road Cemetery, Hadleigh is marked by a Welsh slate headstone cut by Donald Simpson.

In 1984 the Tate Gallery held a retrospective exhibition of Morris's work.

== Painting style ==
Cedric Morris had a distinctive and often rather primitive post-Impressionist style, and painted portraits, landscapes and very decorative still lifes of flowers and birds. In his analysis of Morris's paintings, Richard Morphet has suggested that the "unusual force of Cedric's paintings derives from the projection of the subject through a dynamic economy in combination with an acute sense of pictorial realism."

As a portrait painter he produced notable studies of subjects such as Arthur Lett-Haines (1919; 1925; 1928), Anita Berry (1920), Hilaire Hiler (1920), John Banting (1923), Rupert Doone (ca. 1923), Mary Butts (1924), Barbara Hepworth (1931), Arthur Elton (1931), Rosamond Lehmann (1932), Audrey Debenham (1935), The Sisters [F. Byng Stamper and C. Byng Lucas] (1935), Anna Wickham (1936), Gladys Hynes (1936), Millie Gomersall/Hayes (1936; 1966), Lucian Freud (1940) (who painted him in the same year (National Museum of Wales)), Richard Chopping (1941), Mrs Ernest Freud (1942?), Belle of Bloomsbury (1948), as well as a striking portrait of himself in 1919.

== Personal life ==
As soon as they met on Armistice Night in 1918, Morris fell in love with Arthur Lett-Haines. He moved in with Lett-Haines and his wife, Gertrude Aimee Lincoln. Gertrude returned to her native America, and the two men spent the rest of their lives together, although both had affairs, Morris with the painter John Aldridge and artist Paul Odo Cross (1898-1963, who financed the purchase of Benton End) and Lett-Haines with Stella Hamilton and Kathleen Hale.

== Exhibitions ==
The exhibition "Cedric Morris" was held at Tate Gallery from 28 March to 13 May 1984. Guide Published by order of the Trustees 1984, Tate Gallery Publications ISBN 0 946590 06 0

The exhibition "Cedric Morris: Beyond the Garden Wall" was held at Philip Mould's gallery on Pall Mall, from 18 April-22 July 2018. A simultaneous exhibition, 'Cedric Morris: Artist Plantsman' was also held at the Garden Museum in Lambeth.

The exhibition "Life with Art: Benton End and the East Anglian School of Painting and Drawing" was held at Firstsite, in Colchester, Essex, from 11 December 2021 to 18 April 2022, featuring Morris' work together with other artists associated with his time at Benton End.

In 2022 a permanent exhibition of 15 of his works, primarily portraits, was installed at Gainsborough's House, Thomas Gainsborough's childhood home in Sudbury. Some of the paintings were donated by Maggi Hambling. Morris had donated a painting of a lily to the Gainsborough’s House Society during his lifetime in 1957.

In May 2025, an exhibition on Morris' flower paintings titled Garden To Canvas: Cedric Morris & Benton End was held at Philip Mould & Co, in Pall Mall, London.

== List of some works in public galleries ==
- Frances Hodgkins [drawing], 1917, Tate Britain, London
- Self Portrait, 1919, National Museum Cardiff (NMGW)
- A Roman Cafe [drawing], 1922, National Museum Cardiff
- Patisseries and a croissant, 1922, Tate
- Experiment in textures, 1923, Tate
- Spring flowers, 1923, Museum of New Zealand Te Papa Tongarewa
- Landscape:Vallee de L'Oueze, 1925, National Museum Cardiff
- From a window at 45 Brook Street London, 1926
- Djerba No.2, 1926, Auckland Art Gallery, New Zealand
- Breton Landscape, 1927, Huddersfield Art Gallery
- Portrait of Frances Hodgkins, 1928, Auckland Art Gallery, New Zealand
- Herstmonceux Church, 1928, Towner Gallery, Eastbourne
- Llanmadoc Hill, Gower, 1928, Glynn Vivian Art Gallery, Swansea
- Sparrowhawks, 1929, Glynn Vivian Art Gallery, Swansea
- Self Portrait, 1930, National Portrait Gallery, London
- Solva, 1934, Norwich
- Caeharris Post Office, Dowlais, 1935, Cyfarthfa Castle Museum, Merthyr Tydfil
- The Tips, Dowlais, 1935, Cyfarthfa Castle Museum, Merthyr Tydfil
- Antonia White, 1936, National Portrait Gallery, London
- Millie Gomersall, 1936, The Minories, Colchester
- Lake Patzcuaro, 1939, National Museum Cardiff
- David and Barbara Carr, 1940, Tate Britain
- Stoke by Nayland Church, 1940, National Museum Cardiff
- Lucian Freud, 1941, Tate Britain
- Heron, 1941, Astley Cheetham Art Gallery, Tameside
- Peregrine Falcons, 1942, Tate Britain
- Iris Seedlings, 1943, Tate Britain
- Eggs, 1944, Tate Britain
- Pontypridd, 1945, Glynn Vivian Art Gallery, Swansea
- Belle of Bloomsbury, 1948, Tate
- Paintings by Cedric Morris, October, 1959, The Minories, Colchester
- Sir Cedric Morris Portraits 1919–1974, October – November 1974, The Minories, Colchester
- Colchester Art Society Sponsored Exhibition 'Sir Cedric Morris', 13 September-19 October 1980, The Minories, Colchester

== List of plants named after Cedric Morris ==
- Geranium sanguineum 'Cedric Morris' – hardy geranium
- Narcissus minor 'Cedric Morris' – narcissus
- Lathyrus odoratus 'Cedric Morris' – sweet pea
- Papaver rhoeas 'Cedric Morris' – poppy
- Rosa x hybridum 'Cedric Morris' – rambling rose
- Zauschneria californica cana 'Sir Cedric Morris' – California fuchsia / Zauschneria

== Arms ==
Coat of arms of Cedric Morris
Crest A lion rampant Or charged on the shoulder with a cross couped Gules within a chain in the form of an arch Or. Escutcheon Sable on a saltire engrailed Ermine a bezant charged with a cross couped Gules. Motto Scuto Fidei (By The Shield of Faith)

== Bibliography ==
- Cedric Morris, 'Concerning flower painting', in The Studio; vol. 123 no.590 (1942 May), pp. 121–123
- Ronald Blythe, 'Sir Cedric Morris', in People, ed. Susan Hill (1983), pp. 25–31
- Richard Morphet, Cedric Morris The Tate Gallery [exhibition catalogue] (1984)
- Debrett's Peerage and Baronetage (1990)
- Benton End Remembered by G. Reynolds (2002)
- Cedric Morris and Lett Haines: Teaching, Art and Life, by B. Tufnell, N. Thornton, H. Waters (2003)
- Cedric Morris a Lett Haines: Dysgu, Celfyddyd a Bywyd, by B. Tufnell (2003)
- Richard Morphet, 'Morris, Sir Cedric Lockwood, ninth baronet (1889–1982)', in Oxford Dictionary of National Biography (Sept 2004)
- N. Hepburn, ''Cedric Morris & Christopher Wood A forgotten friendship'' (2012)

Baronetage of the United Kingdom
Preceded by George Lockwood Morris	Baronet (of Clasemont); 1947–1982	Succeeded by Robert Byng Morris
