= Continuous motion pot washing =

Continuous motion pot washing systems are, in the most basic form, three compartment sinks with an agitating wash compartment. Most commonly used in the food service industry, the term continuous motion pot washing describes washing systems that do not have a set wash cycle (a.k.a. cycle-less) or require an attendant. Unlike old three compartment sink systems where an employee was tied to a machine for hours scrubbing dirty ware, continuous motion pot washing systems allow employees to drop any number or type of pots and pans in the system and walk away. Later any employee can come by and move ware items to other compartments of the system. These systems are called “continuous motion” because they never stop working. When the machine is turned on, they are always running and always washing. The motion created is a very turbulent agitation created by a flow of continuous fluid movement powered by a motorized system.

== History ==
The term "Continuous Motion Pot Washing" was coined in 1987 by the Cantrell family who designed the "Power Soak" pot washing system in Kansas City, Missouri. Designed with powerful jet and intake manifolds on the back of the main compartment tank, the Power Soak was the first continuous motion pot washing system sold. Since 1987 many competitors have entered the category as manufacturers of similar continuous motion pot washing systems. Among these competitors include the AquaScrubber by Insinger the TurboWash by Hobart and the X-Stream Wash by Steelkor.

== How it works ==
A continuous motion system uses the natural properties of highly turbulent water, heat, and low foam detergent to clean kitchenware products. Powered by one or more motorized pumps, continuous motion pot washing systems re-circulate water through a series of jets and intakes to create a whirlpool-like motion that agitates the water within the wash tank to continuously move the waste products. These jets and intakes can be located in a variety of locations depending on the manufacturer and model.

== Sources ==
- "The Scrub Down: Recent innovations offer solutions to pot washing". 2007-09-27. Archived from the original on 2007-09-27.
- "Reducing Manual Pot-washing with a Pot-washing Machine". 2007-09-29. Archived from the original on 2007-09-29.
