= Amberfield School =

Location
- Nacton Road; Ipswich, Suffolk, IP10 0HL; England; 52°01′11″N 1°14′26″E

Information
- Type: Private day school
- Motto: Valens sed Clemens "Strong but Gentle"
- Religious affiliation: Protestant
- Established: 1927
- Closed: 2011
- Headmistresses: Pearl Webb, Louise Amphlett Lewis, Helen Kay, Linda Ingram
- Gender: Girls (Boys 3 - 7 years)
- Age: 3 to 16
- Enrolment: c. 300
- Houses: Brook, Cobbold, Wolsey / latterly Dunwich, Rendlesham, Thetford and Tunstall
- Colours: Blue, Green, Red / latterly Blue,red,yellow and green (respectively)
- Publication: Amberfield Plus
- Website: http://www.amberfieldschool.co.uk

Amberfield School was a small private school in Nacton, England, coeducational up to the age of 7 years, and for girls up to the age of 16 years, which was established in 1927 and closed in 2011 due to financial problems. The last headmistress was Linda Ingram. It was set in countryside with surrounding fields and wildlife. It won the Lego League Robotics UK Championships and the World Primary Robot Dance Championship held in Suzhou, China as part of RoboCup Junior in 2008. The school occupied the site of Nacton Workhouse, near woodland where the body of one of the victims of the Ipswich 2006 serial murders, was found. The school was a member of the Girls' Schools Association.

== History ==
The school was founded by sisters Gertrude, Eleanor and Margaret Roberts in 1927 from their home in Ipswich. In 1951, the school moved from Crofton Road to the former site of the House of Industry Workhouse at Nacton where it remained until the school's closure in 2011. An educational trust was formed in 1962, with Margaret Roberts and Jean Horsburgh as joint headmistresses. Margaret Roberts retired in 1966 and Jean Horsburgh retired in 1972. Pearl Webb took over as headmistress from Jean Horsburgh, until she left in 1992. Louise Amphlett Lewis headed the school until 2005. Helen Kay, a mathematics teacher, took over but left unexpectedly mid-year in 2008. Linda Ingram was then headmistress until the school's closing in 2011.

== Notable former pupils ==
- Maggi Hambling, artist

== School closure ==
On 12 October 2011 the school website was replaced by a press release headed "Amberfield School to close". It stated that "Amberfield School will close on 31 October 2011 and go into liquidation thereafter due to unsustainable losses". BBC Look East that evening reported that the debts were over £1 million and that the school would in fact close on Friday 14 October 2011, which it did. At the time of closure there were 32 teaching staff and 23 non-teaching staff, also 157 pupils, 70 down on earlier levels.

On Saturday 15 October 2011 a news report headed "Comeback hopes as school is closed in debt crisis" stated that given just 48 hours' notice a group of parents had tried to raise £200,000 to keep the school running until Christmas, but with parents concerned for their children's education seeking places at other nearby independent schools, closure of Amberfield was inevitable. The parent group subsequently stated it would not give up hope of seeing the school reopen in the New Year.
