= Joan Warburton =

British artist (1920–1996)

- Born: 17 April 1920; Edinburgh, Scotland
- Died: 30 July 1996 (aged 76); Stoke-by-Nayland, Suffolk, England
- Education: East Anglian School of Painting and Drawing
- Known for: Painting
- Spouse: Peter O'Malley (m. 1946–1994, his death)

Joan Warburton (17 April 1920 – 30 July 1996) was a British artist.

She was born in Edinburgh, Scotland, into an army family but grew up in England near Colchester. She attended a finishing school in Belgium and then, in 1936, began studying art in Brussels under Oswald Poreau. From 1937 to 1940, Warburton studied at the East Anglian School of Painting and Drawing in Dedham, where she was taught by Cedric Morris and Arthur Lett-Haines. In both 1941 and 1942, Warburton had works exhibited at the Ipswich Art Club. During World War II, she served in the Women's Royal Naval Service and later worked in an armaments factory and also spent time working as an ambulance driver with the Red Cross.

After the war, in 1945, Warburton married Peter O'Malley, a ceramics lecturer at the Royal College of Art (RCA), and the couple settled in London. Warburton had a solo exhibition at the Weekend Gallery in 1948 and at Foyles Gallery in 1959 and also exhibited with the Women's International Art Club. Her work featured in numerous group shows including some at the Royal Academy, with the Society for Education in Art and at the Leicester Galleries. Later, in 1984, she had a solo exhibition at the Michael Parkin Gallery. This was followed by a series of solo shows at Sally Hunter Fine Art. When O'Malley retired from the RCA, the couple moved to Suffolk, where Warburton died in 1996.
