= Papaver orientale 'Patty's Plum' =

Species of flowering plant

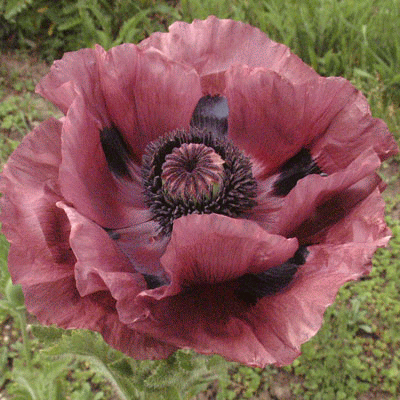
- Genus: Papaver
- Species: Papaver orientale
- Cultivar: 'Patty's Plum'
- Breeder: Patricia Marrow
- Origin: Somerset, United Kingdom

Papaver orientale 'Patty's Plum' is a poppy originally discovered growing in a compost heap at Kingsdon Nursery Garden, Somerset, UK, by Sandra Pope of Hadspen House, Somerset, UK, who had come to work in Mrs Patricia Marrow's garden. After the damson colour of the poppy was noticed, Marrow propagated it. She and Pope later came up with a name "Patty's Plum" because that is Marrow's first name, and it is typical of Marrow to describe the colour as "Plum". The cultivar has also been known under the synonym: Papaver orientale 'Mrs Marrow's Plum'.

== Description ==
Papaver orientale 'Patty's Plum' is an herbaceous perennial. This cultivar grows to a maximum height of 80cm tall. Plants host large flamboyant flowers, which possess black blotches at the base of each petal. Blooms are purple or plum pink in colour and will fade with age.

== Uses ==
Papaver orientale 'Patty's Plum' is used as an ornamental plant, which can be planted into flowerbeds and garden borders. Due to the cultivars large flowers and unusual colour it is also sometimes used as a cut flower.
