= Oriental Poppies =

Painting by Georgia O'Keeffe

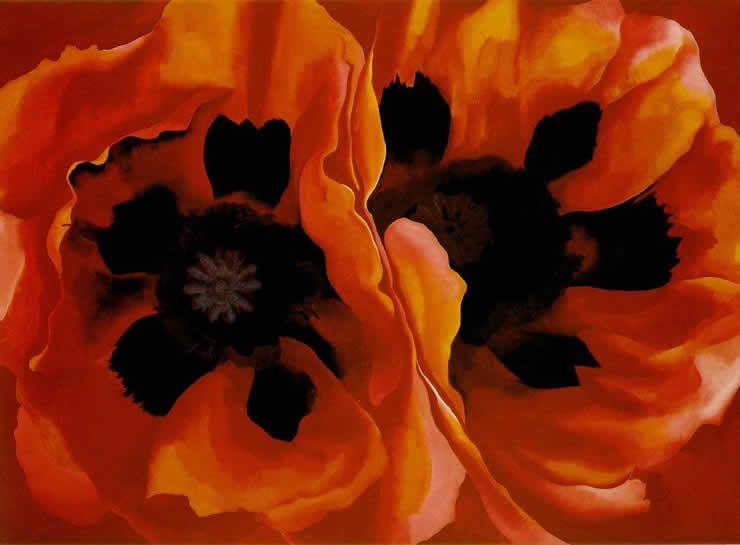
- Artist: Georgia O'Keeffe
- Year: 1927
- Medium: Oil on canvas
- Dimensions: 101.6 cm × 76.2 cm (40.0 in × 30.0 in)
- Location: Weisman Art Museum; Minneapolis

Oriental Poppies, also called Red Poppies, is a 1927 oil-on-canvas painting by Georgia O'Keeffe. (Note: The Arts Desk states that the painting was made in 1927, as does The Guardian, who also states in another article that it was made in 1928.) It is a close-up of two Papaver orientale flowers that fill the entire canvas.

== Description ==
The Arts Desk describes it as more subtle but equally powerful as Calla Lilies on Red, "Peering into the bright-orange petals, O’Keeffe reveals the velvety dark interior. The drama of this provocative image stems from the juxtaposition of vivid color and intrusive close-up." Of the large close-up, O'Keeffe said that she decided that she would paint flowers "big and they will be surprised into taking time to look at it - I will make even busy New-Yorkers take time to see what I see of flowers." Making close-ups of flowers is said to have been influenced by her husband Alfred Stieglitz, a photographer, after they began a more sexual relationship.

Along with Black Iris, Liese Spencer of The Guardian calls it one of "her lush, sensual paintings of flowers." It fills the nearly four foot wide canvas, without a background, so that the flowers "explode" on the canvas, and direct the eye to the center of the flowers. It is among her most famous works of art.

== Collection ==
The painting is owned by the Weisman Art Museum of the University of Minnesota, where as of July 2016 it was the most valuable painting in their collection. Prior to its acquisition in 1937, it was exhibited by Stieglitz at his gallery, An American Place, in New York City.

== Exhibitions ==
In 2016, Tate Modern in London exhibited Oriental Poppies along with more than 100 of O'Keeffe's major works of art, made over six decades. The exhibition was also held at the Bank Austria Kunstforum in Vienna that year.
