= Pot washing =

Pot washing is the process of cleaning low to heavily baked-on items off of restaurant kitchen food equipment, including pots, pans, trays, tubs and more.

Pot washing is often a heavy sector in restaurants and kitchens, ergonomically a burden and a bottleneck in the process. It is often difficult to keep the pot-washing area clean and overall can be quite labor-intensive.

== Different pot-washing applications ==
=== Manual handwashing ===
The classic and “old” process for cleaning pots and pans is the manual hand-washing method. Washing pots and pans by hand is still the ideal way to do the job. Cleaning by hand involves a pot-washing sink, which almost always is divided into 3 different sections. The first section, or "sink", is where the pots are washed and scrubbed. The middle section is for rinsing and the third for sanitizing.

=== Power scrubber ===
In simple terms, the power scrubber is a pot brush with an electric motor. Recognizing the effort it takes to scrub pots with baked-on food or grease, at least one manufacturer has designed these brushes to rotate on flexible power shafts and scour pots, pans and utensils with minimal effort. The power unit for the scrubber typically mounts on the wall at the pot sink and is connected to a six-foot flexible shaft used to scrub the soiled dishware. One manufacturer makes a variety of brushes and scrubbers that can be easily changed on the shaft. In addition to the traditional brushes, there are wire brushes for scouring tougher soil and even an impregnated plastic composite head for scrubbing baked-on carbon deposits from pots and baking pans.

=== Recirculating soaker ===
Fairly new to the restaurant industry, the recirculating soaker does most of the work itself with little manual scrubbing required. While the actual design is a bit more complex, these units basically consist of a big water pump built into a pot sink. The cleaning formula behind the recirculator is simply water agitation or water moving around soiled pots and pans to loosen and wash away food particles and dirt. While this motion will quickly wash away light to medium soil, heavy soil and baked-on carbon deposits could require some scrubbing. Some units also have built-in heaters that work in conjunction with the circulating jets. By keeping the water warm, these heaters act as an aid in loosening soil.

Several types of recirculators are currently on the market. Effective and reasonably priced, the smaller units are composed of fractional horsepower attachments to a pot sink, which loops water through a pump at one end of the sink. All that is needed to retrofit most recirculators in the pot sink is an electrical outlet and a mechanic who will make the appropriate cutout in your sink. One manufacturer has introduced a unit that is able to recirculate, agitate and heat water using the existing drain hole as the water inlet. This new unit can be installed easily and does not require any holes to be punched in the sink itself.

On the other hand, if you run a larger operation and use a lot of labor to wash pots, it might be worth the extra money to go big. Most of the larger recirculating soakers are bought as an entire specialized pot sink in an integral unit and cannot be retrofitted into an existing sink. These might have a 1¼ or 2 horsepower (1.5 kW) motor with water intakes and outlet jets perfectly positioned in a properly sized sink bowl. Essentially custom built for different types of operations and the space configuration available, the larger recirculators are available in three compartment sink sizes with various options. In addition to requiring a three-phase supply for the water pump and high-power heater, these larger units have wash sinks with up to 75 U.S. gallons (280 L) of water capacity for handling many pots and pans. Some of the other options available with recirculators include built-in waste disposers, drain boards of various lengths, shelves over or under and additional scraper sinks. Along with the standard heater for the wash tank that keeps the water at about 120 °F (49 °C), operators can choose sanitizer sink heaters that boost water to 180 °F (82 °C). As operators use these recirculating soakers as a replacement for ordinary pot washing, they will find that using this type of equipment has even more advantages: reduced labor, cleaner pots and pans, and improved morale among pot washers.

=== Heated soak tanks ===
Another recent innovation is that of heated soak tanks. These tanks come in various sizes, but all act off the same principles. The tanks are heated to a temperature of approximately 185 °F (85 °C) which acts as a catalyst for the chemical reactions whereby the carbon and fats from the heavily soiled pots and pans break down. The chemicals used in these cleaning tanks are non caustic and often biodegradable, with a PH of 10-11. Lightly soiled items can be soaked for a couple of hours, whilst badly burnt pots should be soaked over night. The tanks are known to be used in no less than 20 000 restaurants worldwide.

== See also ==
- Continuous motion pot washing
