= Kathleen Hale =

British illustrator and children's author

- Born: 24 May 1898; Lanarkshire, Scotland
- Died: 26 January 2000 (aged 101); Bristol, England
- Spouse: Douglas McClean (m. 1926; died 1967)
- Children: 2
- Writing career
- Notable work: Orlando (The Marmalade Cat)

Kathleen Hale OBE (24 May 1898 – 26 January 2000) was a British artist, illustrator, and children's author. She is best remembered for her series of books about Orlando the Marmalade Cat.

== Early Life and Education ==
Hale was born in Lanarkshire but brought up in Manchester. Her father died when she was five and her mother decided to take over his job as travelling salesman for Chappell's pianos. From 1903 to 1905 she lived at the vicarage in Shelf, West Yorkshire where her interests in botany and illustrating developed. Her childhood was far from idyllic and she was forced to endure long periods of separation from her mother. This, along with the frustrations of an unexpressed artistic talent, produced a rebellious reaction in the young girl's naturally ebullient nature. However, her talent as an artist was recognised at school by a sympathetic headmistress at Manchester High School for Girls and she went on to attend art courses in Manchester and, from 1915 to 1917, at University College, Reading, where she was taught by Allen W. Seaby.

== Career ==
Kathleen Hale moved to London in 1917, intending to make a life for herself as an artist. She worked for some time as Augustus John's secretary while she developed a wide circle of friends, including Vanessa Bell and Duncan Grant. During the 1920s she earned a living as an illustrator, accepting commissions for book jackets, posters and illustrations for children's books, as well as selling her own drawings. She also attended the Central School of Arts and Crafts. Hale spent time in Paris in 1923, where she met the couple Cedric Morris and Arthur Lett-Haines.

Kathleen Hale married Douglas McClean, a young doctor working in medical research, and they settled in Hertfordshire. She created the marmalade cat Orlando and his world to entertain her children at bedtime, and in the late 1930s she began producing her series of books about him, among the earliest picture books produced using photolithography. In 1941 Orlando's Evening Out became the first fictional picture book published by Puffin Books, the children's imprint of Penguin Books.

Kathleen Hale was awarded the OBE in 1976.

Hale was the castaway on Desert Island Discs on BBC Radio 4 on 30 October 1994. She was interviewed by Sue Lawley and chose the Catalan song "Cobla La Principal de Peralada" as well as pieces by Anton Karas, Gertrude Lawrence and Scott Joplin as her favourite records, Marcel Proust's In Search of Lost Time as her choice of book, and a djellaba made from golden cloth as her luxury item.

Kathleen Hale died in Bristol on 26 January 2000, aged 101.

== Bibliography ==
=== Orlando series ===
- Orlando the Marmalade Cat: A Camping Holiday (1938)
- Orlando the Marmalade Cat: A Trip Abroad (1939)
- Orlando's Evening Out (1941)
- Orlando the Marmalade Cat: Buys a Farm (1942)
- Orlando's Home Life (1942)
- Orlando the Marmalade Cat: His Silver Wedding (1944)
- Orlando the Marmalade Cat: Becomes a Doctor (1944)
- Orlando's Invisible Pyjamas (1947)
- Orlando the Marmalade Cat: Keeps a Dog (1948)
- Orlando the Judge (1950)
- Orlando the Marmalade Cat: A Seaside Holiday (1952)
- Orlando's Zoo (1954)
- Orlando the Marmalade Cat: The Frisky Housewife (1956)
- Orlando's Magic Carpet (1958)
- Orlando's Country Peepshow (1959)
- Orlando the Marmalade Cat: Buys a Cottage (1963)
- Orlando and the Three Graces (1965)
- Orlando Goes to the Moon (1968)
- Orlando and the Water Cats (1972)

=== Other books ===
- Don’t Mix Much with Fairies (1928)
- Henrietta, the Faithful Hen (1943)
- Manda (1952)
- Henrietta's Magic Egg (1973)
- A Slender Reputation: An Autobiography (1994)
