= Orlando (fictional cat) =

Orlando (the Marmalade Cat)
- First appearance: Orlando (the Marmalade Cat): A Camping Holiday (1938)
- Last appearance: Orlando and the Water Cats (1972)
- Created by: Kathleen Hale

In-universe information
- Species: Marmalade Cat
- Gender: Male
- Title: Orlando (the Marmalade Cat)
- Occupation: Pet cat, adventurer
- Spouse: Grace
- Children: Pansy (tortoiseshell), Blanche (white), Tinkle (black)
- Relatives: Pansy, Blanche, Tinkle

Orlando (The Marmalade Cat) is the fictional eponymous hero of the series (of the same name) of 19 illustrated children's books written by Kathleen Hale between 1938 and 1972, issued by various publishers including Country Life and Puffin Picture Books. The series involves a marmalade cat (most likely a ginger tabby) named Orlando, and his adventures with his family and wife named Grace.

== Background ==
The Orlando (The Marmalade Cat) books were created by Kathleen Hale for her two children, and Orlando was inspired by their real-life cat Orlando. When Country Life first published Orlando (the Marmalade Cat): A Camping Holiday, it became an instant success. Kathleen Hale then continued the series, giving Orlando a magic carpet in 1958, and ended the series with Orlando and the Water Cats (1972).

== Plot ==
Orlando's family consist of his wife Grace, and three kittens: Blanche (white), Pansy (tortoiseshell) and Tinkle (black). The family, especially Orlando, get involved in many adventures together and make friends as they do so. They can range from going to the Moon (Orlando Goes to the Moon), becoming a replacement judge (Orlando the Judge) or to keeping a large black poodle dog (Orlando (the Marmalade Cat): Keeps a Dog).

== Characters ==
=== Major ===
- Blanche - Blanche is one of the three kittens, and is pure white.
- Grace - The wife of Orlando, she and the kittens almost always accompany Orlando. She often wears large hats and skirts, and once wore a wedding-dress made of fish on their (Orlando's and Grace's) wedding day, and in Orlando's Home Life wore a fur coat in the pattern of a leopard's fur. She is a tabby cat, with a small, stubby nose like a ripe apricot.
- Orlando - The hero of the series, he is a marmalade-coloured cat with eyes like two green gooseberries. He sometimes keeps his watch on his tail, and later on in the series he is friends with a living magic carpet named Fatima.
- Pansy - Pansy is one of Orlando's and Grace's three kittens, and she is a tortoiseshell.
- Tinkle - The most mischievous of the kittens, he is a black cat and owns a pet spider. He was responsible for creating the events in Orlando and the Three Graces, and is friends with Cupid the brown foal.
- Vulcan - Vulcan is a horse who, along with his wife Venus, first appeared in Orlando (the Marmalade Cat) Buys a Farm. He is the creature who made the events in Orlando (the Marmalade Cat): A Seaside Holiday possible, as he had found a place to stay in Owlbarrow. Vulcan returned in Orlando Goes to the Moon, pulling Orlando's moon rocket with Cupid and his wife Venus.

=== Minor ===
- Cattermole - Mr. Cattermole owns a shop for cats that opens after midnight. In Orlando's Home Life, when Orlando and Grace needed money to send the kittens to school, they made several inventions and gave them to Cattermole. A glimpse of his face can be seen in Orlando (the Marmalade Cat): A Seaside Holiday, and he gives Orlando his Moon rocket, space suits and a present for the Man in the Moon in Orlando Goes to the Moon.
- Cupid - Cupid is the foal of Vulcan and his wife Venus, and appeared in Orlando the Marmalade Cat: A Seaside Holiday. In the book, he eats a cauliflower, some flowers and a hat. He reappeared in Orlando Goes to the Moon, pulling Orlando's Moon rocket with Venus and Vulcan.
- Fluffy - Judge Wiggins' pet cat, he is the villain in Orlando the Judge for stealing Mr. Gorgon's cheese for his mousetraps. He eventually became a guardian for the Old Mice's Home as punishment.
- Wiggins - Wiggins is a judge who owns Fluffy the cat. He appears in Orlando the Judge, with a cold.
- Mr Gorgon and Mr Zola - Two men who look very alike. They both love cheese.

== Books ==
Books in the series are:

- Orlando (the Marmalade Cat): A Camping Holiday (1938)
- Orlando (the Marmalade Cat): A Trip Abroad (1939)
- Orlando's Evening Out (1941)
- Orlando (the Marmalade Cat) Buys a Farm (1942)
- Orlando's Home Life (1942) - In this book, Orlando tells his wife Grace that the kittens should be sent to learn something as soon as possible, or "nobody will want them". Unfortunately, Orlando and Grace do not have enough money to send them to school, so they give Mr. Cattermole (the owner of a shop especially for cats, which only opens at night) three inventions - cream to stop making cats wet, a "Puss Protector" which makes cars jump over jay-walking cats, and Grace's fluffy blankets for invalid cats. Because their inventions becomes a success, they earn enough money from Mr. Cattermole and are then able to send the kittens to school. However, they hated it with a passion, and "did all they could to be expelled". Pansy was first to be expelled (by presenting half her face to the headmistress), then Blanche (who pretended to faint) and finally Tinkle. Orlando and Grace then decide to get private tutors to educate their kittens in different subjects, and eventually Pansy learns to be an actress, Blanche to be a dancer, and Tinkle a master of the arts (sculpture, painting, music, literature). However, Orlando finds Grace crying into the kitchen sink while washing the dishes, and because she feels old without her kittens, Orlando dismisses all of the teachers (to the kittens' delight, especially Tinkle's as he was painting himself and carving the harp Orlando gave him) and took Grace out, while the kittens secretly write a surprise play for her and Orlando. Orlando takes Grace to a fishmonger's, a luxury clothes shop (and orders a fur coat for Grace which arrives the next day) and to visit Mr. Cattermole, who gives them microphones as a mark of his gratitude. The next day, when Grace's coat arrives, Orlando's family prepare to go to the cat-show, and as Grace adores a pair of Siamese cats, the kittens add this to their surprise play. That night, the kittens perform their play and have 5 acts - the Scarf Dance by Blanche (music by Tinkle), the Hairy Heart, the Whiskered Meringue, a pair of "Siamese" kittens (Blanche partly covered in soot and Tinkle partly covered in flour), and finally a Fan Dance performed by Pansy. Afterwards, Orlando and Grace sing on the rooftops with their microphones, and finally went to bed and "dreamt of Sardines".
- Orlando (the Marmalade Cat): His Silver Wedding (1944) - Also known as Orlando's Silver Wedding, this book tells the story of Orlando and Grace's marriage.
- Orlando (the Marmalade Cat): Becomes a Doctor (1944)
- Orlando's Invisible Pyjamas (1947) - Orlando accidentally loses the fur from his lower part, and hides in the garden so he will not be seen. Grace cleverly knits him a pyjama bottom that looks just like his fur to hide the bareness. After a time he needs to take it off, and finds another layer underneath, which he thinks Grace has made, but it is actually his own fur which has grown back after all.
- Orlando (the Marmalade Cat): Keeps a Dog (1949)
- Orlando the Judge (1950) - When Mr. Gorgon suspects Mr. Zola of stealing his cheese, Orlando is in despair that his two friends are arguing. He is then called to Judge Wiggins, who has a cold and is not getting better as his arrogant pet cat named Fluffy takes everything he needs to eat. Orlando eventually takes his place while Grace boils Wiggins some milk, and the kittens investigate the mystery of the missing cheese. At the end of the book, it is revealed that Fluffy stole the cheese for his mouse-trap (for he is frightened of mice), and he eventually becomes a guard for the Old Mice's Home as punishment. Mr. Gorgon and Mr. Zola become friends again, and Wiggins' cold begins to get better.
- Orlando (the Marmalade Cat): A Seaside Holiday (1952) - In A Seaside Holiday, they stay in the town of 'Owlbarrow', a thinly disguised version of Aldeburgh on the coast of Suffolk: many of the illustrations feature landmarks in the town. One hot summer's day, Orlando is disappointed that he and his family cannot go on holiday, until unexpectedly their friend Vulcan the Horse visits their house to say that himself (Vulcan), his wife Venus and their foal Cupid are going to go on holiday with Orlando, in a docked boat over in Owlbarrow. There, they meet a lady named Salubrious (Sally for short) and a dachshund named Daisy. They spend the rest of their stay there flying a kite, discovering a "mermaid", rescuing people (including a queen named Catalpa) from a shipwreck and cheering up the grumpy Mr. Curmudgeon. The book ends with Catalpa living with the now-jolly Curmudgeon, the rescued people gaining a new ship which looks like Orlando (as well as having Sally as their new queen) and both Orlando and Vulcan's family going back home. Along with the reprint of Orlando (the Marmalade Cat): A Camping Holiday by Puffin, this is the book that is the most easiest to buy, and is published by the Penguin Group as a reprint.
- Orlando's Zoo (1954)
- Orlando (the Marmalade Cat): The Frisky Housewife (1956)
- Orlando's Magic Carpet (1958)
- Orlando's Country Peepshow (1959) -A "novelty" or "gimmick" book. It consisted of four sections that were joined, and opened to the shape of a merry-go-round, or carousel. Each section contained a cut-out scene with layers like a theatre stage's "flats", or like decoupage. Each section showed a theatre scene, or tableau, of one of the four seasons of Orlando's farm, with the scenes showing spring planting, summer growing, autumn harvesting, and winter relaxing at Christmas.
- Orlando, the Marmalade Cat, Buys a Cottage (1963)
- Orlando and the Three Graces (1965) - At Christmas, Tinkle receives a magic kit, which contains two sprays. As he wants to give his parents a present, he gives Orlando a box, Pansy and Blanche his pet spider and gives Grace one of the sprays from his magic kit. To do this, he scratches out the word on one of the sprays and replaces it with "TINKLE". When Grace sprays it on herself, however, two other Graces appear, and do exactly the same things that she does. When Orlando sees her, he hisses and refuses to believe her as he knows he has only one wife. Grace spends the rest of the day crying and the kittens hide in fear. They all eventually go to see Father Christmas for help, and on their way they meet the Dog Star, who gives the cats warm haddock milk except for Tinkle (because he insulted him as soon as they met). As soon as they find Father Christmas, he undoes the spell on Grace, and tells Tinkle that he should have read the label. They go back home safely, and have a wonderful Christmas.
- Orlando Goes to the Moon (1968)
- Orlando and the Water Cats (1972)

== Legacy ==
In 1994, a stamp featuring Orlando the Marmalade Cat was released. A one-penny stamp, it shows Orlando writing what is possibly a letter with a quill. The foreground shows green wallpaper.
