= Arthur Lett-Haines =

English painter

- Born: 2 November 1894; Paddington, London
- Died: 25 February 1978 (aged 83); Hadleigh, Suffolk, England
- Resting place: Friars Road Cemetery, Hadleigh, Suffolk, England
- Spouse: Gertrude Aimee Lincoln (married 1916 – separated 1919)
- Partner: Cedric Morris

Arthur Lett-Haines (2 November 1894 – 25 February 1978), known as Lett Haines, was a British painter and sculptor who experimented in many different media, though he generally characterised himself as "an English surrealist". He was part of a London artistic circle, which included D. H. Lawrence, the Sitwells and Wyndham Lewis, but for most of his life lived with the painter and gardener Cedric Morris in Cornwall, Paris and finally Suffolk.

== Biography ==
Arthur Lett was born 2 November 1894, at 9 Walterton Road, Paddington, London, the son of Charles Lett and Frances Laura Esme Lett (who afterwards married S. Sidney Haines). He was educated at St Paul's School, London and then, planning a career in agriculture, he worked on a farm at Poslingford Hall in Clare, Suffolk.

In the First World War he served in the British Army. In 1916 Lett-Haines married (as his second wife; he had been left a widower whilst still a teenager) Michigan-born Gertrude Aimee Lincoln. (Note: Some online sources claim Gertrude was granddaughter of Abraham Lincoln, but she appears in none of the many comprehensive genealogies of his family, e.g. Burke's Presidential Families of the United States of America, ed. Hugh Montgomery-Massingberd, 1981: Abraham Lincoln pedigree, So can be considered untrue) at Hailsham, but when he met the painter Cedric Morris in 1918, the latter moved in with them and in 1919 his wife Aimee returned on her own to America. Morris and Lett-Haines lived together until his death, Haines largely subordinating his own artistic career to promote that of his partner. This relationship lasted some 60 years, despite its open nature that included attachments on both sides such as Haines' affair with the artist and author Kathleen Hale.

After initially living at Newlyn, they moved to Paris in 1920, becoming part of an expatriate artistic community that included Juan Gris, Fernand Léger, Marcel Duchamp, Man Ray, Nancy Cunard and Ernest Hemingway. They returned briefly to London in 1926, before moving in 1929 to Suffolk.

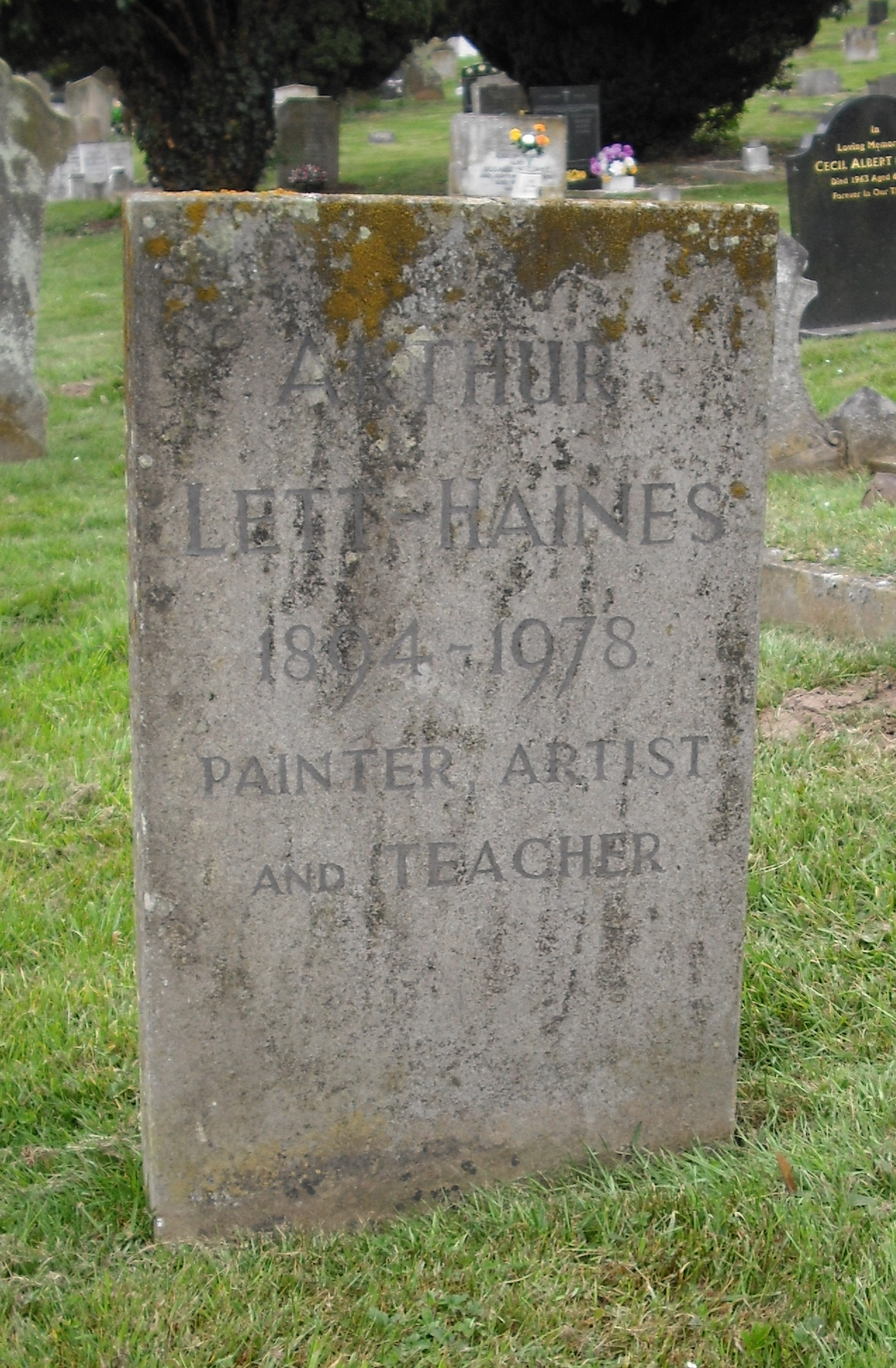
Lett-Haines gravestone, near to that of Cedric Morris, at Hadleigh Cemetery, Hadleigh

In 1937, Morris and Haines founded the East Anglian School of Painting and Drawing at Dedham. When it burned down in 1939, the school was relocated to Benton End, a large house near Hadleigh. Operating on a live-in basis that mingled artistic development with a social circle, its pupils included Lucian Freud, Bettina Shaw-Lawrence, David Kentish, Maggi Hambling, David Carr, Joan Warburton and Glyn Morgan. He exhibited at the Ipswich Art Club in 1942 Parmi Les Fleurs.

In 1946, along with Henry Collins, Cedric Morris, John Nash and Roderic Barrett, Lett Haines became one of the founders of Colchester Art Society and later the Society's President.

The school closed when Haines died in 1978, though Morris continued to live at Benton End until his death in 1982. They are buried near each other at Hadleigh Cemetery in Hadleigh.

A retrospective exhibition was held at Redfern Gallery in 1984 and a joint Morris-Haines "Teaching Art and Life" exhibition at the Norwich Castle Museum and Art Gallery in 2002–2003.

== Portraits of Lett-Haines ==
A sandstone portrait sculpture exists of Lett-Haines by John Skeaping dating from 1933. This work came about after the break-up of Skeaping's marriage to Barbara Hepworth, when Skeaping joined the artists' colony at Morris's house at Higham, Suffolk. A portrait of Lett-Haines by New Zealand artist Frances Hodgkins is held at the Museum of New Zealand Te Papa Tongarewa, Wellington, New Zealand.

== Bibliography ==
- Reynolds, Gwynneth; Grace, Diana; Morphet, Richard (2002). Benton End Remembered: Cedric Morris, Arthur Lett-Haines and the East Anglian School of Painting and Drawing. London: Unicorn Publishing Group. ISBN 0-906290-69-4.
