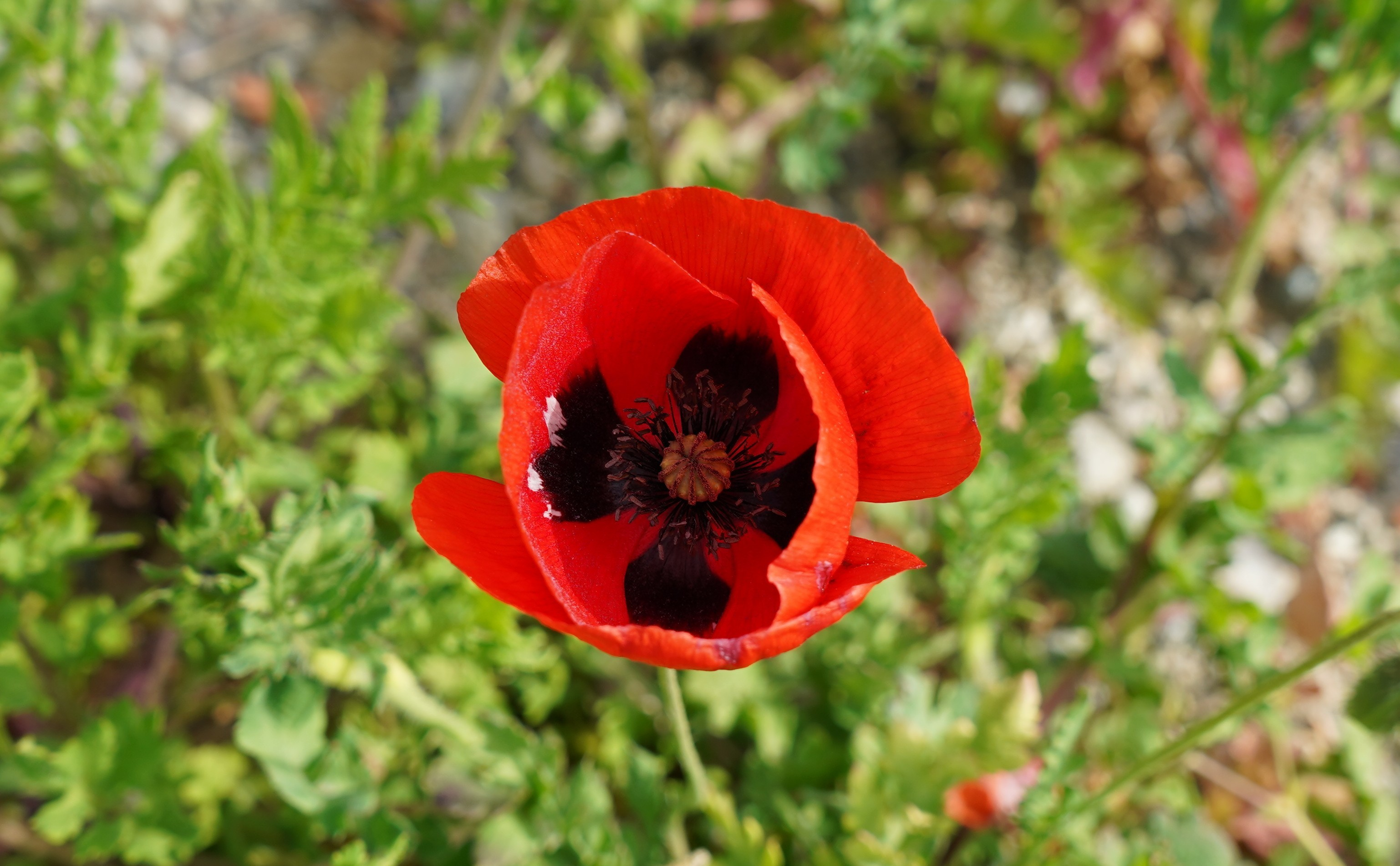

Scientific classification
- Kingdom: Plantae
- Clade: Tracheophytes
- Clade: Angiosperms
- Clade: Eudicots
- Order: Ranunculales
- Family: Papaveraceae
- Genus: Papaver
- Species: P. orientale

Binomial name
- Papaver orientale L.

Synonyms
- Calomecon orientale; Papaver dzeghamicum; Papaver grandiflorum; Papaver monanthum; Papaver paucifoliatum; Papaver spectabile

= Papaver orientale =

Oriental poppy

Species of plant

Papaver orientale, the Oriental poppy, is a perennial flowering plant native to the Caucasus, northeastern Turkey, and northern Iran.

Oriental poppies grow a mound of leaves that are hairy and finely dissected in spring. They gather energy and bloom in mid-summer. After flowering, the foliage dies away entirely, a property that allows their survival in the summer drought of Central Asia. Gardeners can place late-developing plants nearby to fill the developing gap.

== Taxonomy ==
The scientific name Papaver orientale was established in 1753 by Linnaeus. The species is classified in the genus Papaver within the wider family Papaveraceae. It has no varieties that are accepted, but does have four among its thirteen synonyms.

Table of Synonyms
Name	Year	Rank	Notes
Calomecon orientale (L.) Spach	1838	species	≡ hom.
Papaver dzeghamicum Medw.	1915	species	= het.
Papaver grandiflorum Moench	1794	species	= het.
Papaver lateritium subsp. monanthum (Trautv.) Kadereit	1996	subspecies	= het.
Papaver monanthum Trautv.	1866	species	= het.
Papaver oreophilum var. monanthum (Trautv.) N.Busch	1905	variety	= het.
Papaver orientale f. flavolactescens Kuntze	1887	form	= het.
Papaver orientale var. monanthum (Trautv.) Trautv.	1876	variety	= het.
Papaver orientale var. normale Kuntze	1887	variety	= het.
Papaver orientale var. parviflora N.Busch	1905	variety	= het.
Papaver orientale var. paucifoliatum Trautv.	1876	variety	= het.
Papaver paucifoliatum (Trautv.) Fedde	1909	species	= het.
Papaver spectabile Salisb.	1796	species	≡ hom., nom. superfl.
Notes: ≡ homotypic synonym ; = heterotypic synonym

== Cultivation ==
Papaver orientale usually thrives in soil pH 6.5 to 7.5 and in full sun or part shade. Seeds are sown after the potential of frost has passed, the average temperature is approximately 21 °C and when soil has thoroughly warmed. The seeds are sown at a depth of about one centimeter, or less as light may stimulate germination. Oriental Poppies do not handle transplanting or over-watering well. Germination period is 10–20 days. Mulch can be used to protect the plant over the winter and deadheading will produce a second flower.

=== Cultivars ===
Cultivars (those marked agm have gained the Royal Horticultural Society's Award of Garden Merit):-

Name	Colour
Aglaja agm	salmon pink
Barr's White	white
Beauty of Livermere	red
Black and White agm	white/black
Brilliant	red
Carnival	white/orange/red
Carousel	white/orange picotee
Cedric Morris agm	pale pink/black
Effendi agm	pale orange
Fatima	white/pink picotee
GI Joe	red (double)
Helen Elizabeth	pink
Indian Chief	mahogany red
John III agm	orange-red
Karine agm	pale pink / red

Name	Colour
Khedive agm	pale salmon / black
Leuchtfeuer agm	orange
Lighthouse agm	pale pink/maroon
Maiden's Blush	white
Olympia	orange
Papillon	pink
Patty's Plum	plum
Perry's White	white
Picotee	white/orange picotee
Pinnacle	white/red
Royal Wedding	white
Türkenlouis	red
Watermelon	pink

== Gallery ==
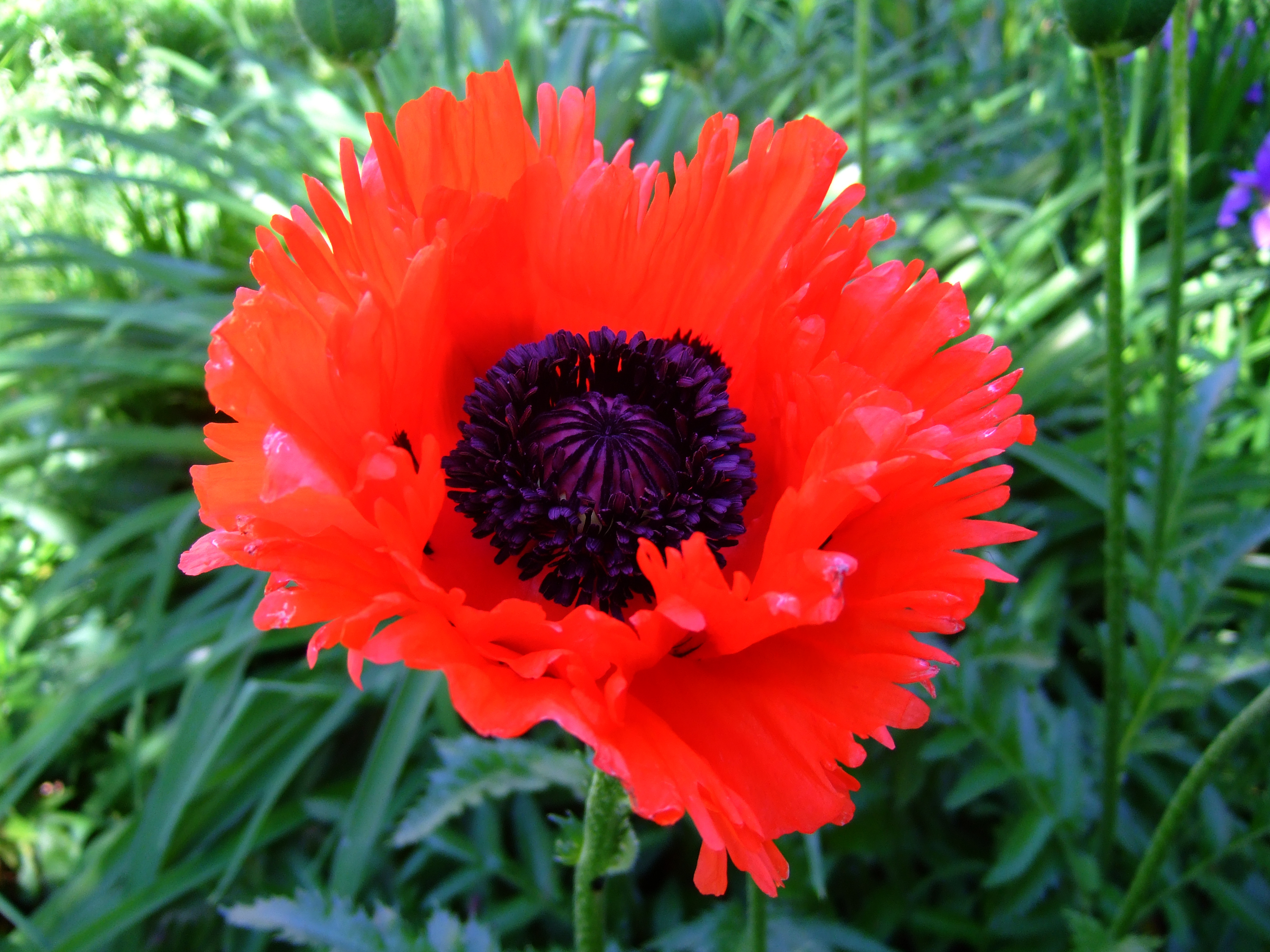
Türkenlouis red, highly fringed

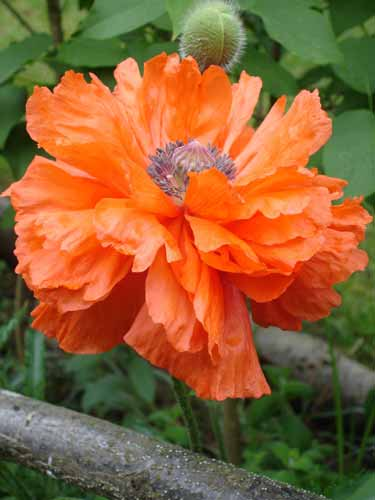
Olympia orange

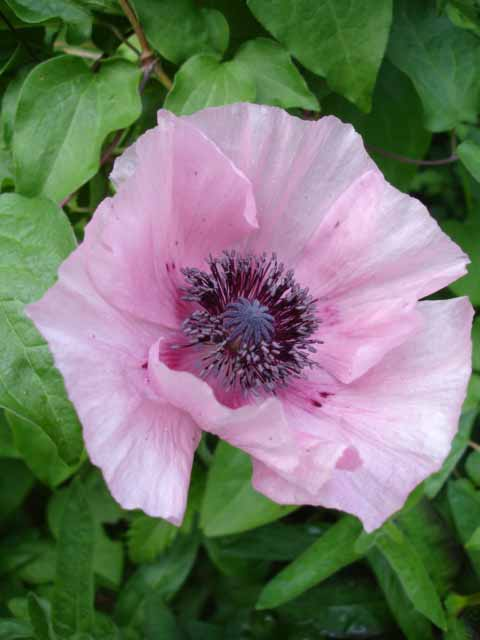
Papillon pink

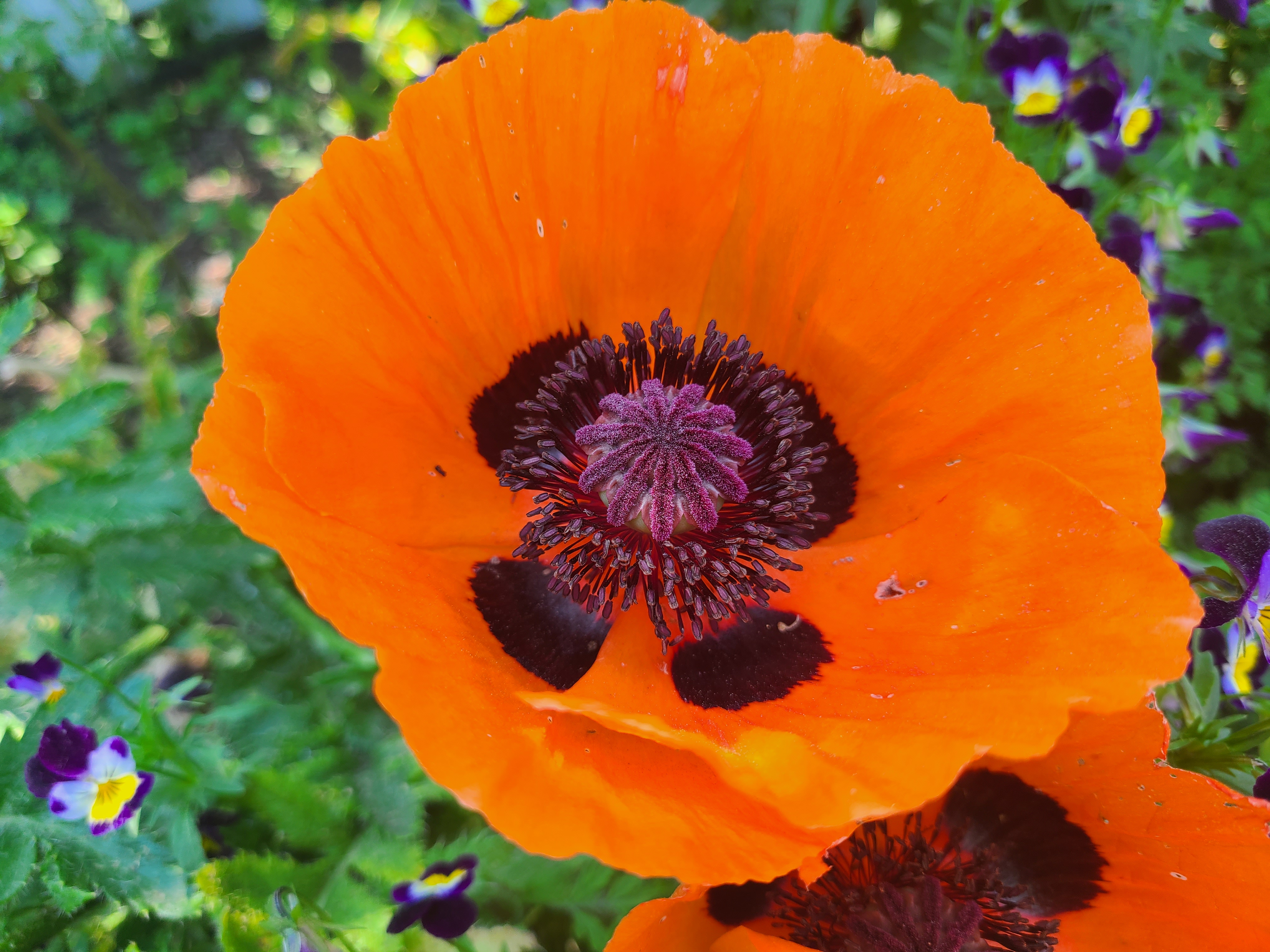
Papaver Orientale (Fruit Punch Poppy) found at the Coastal Maine Botanical Gardens

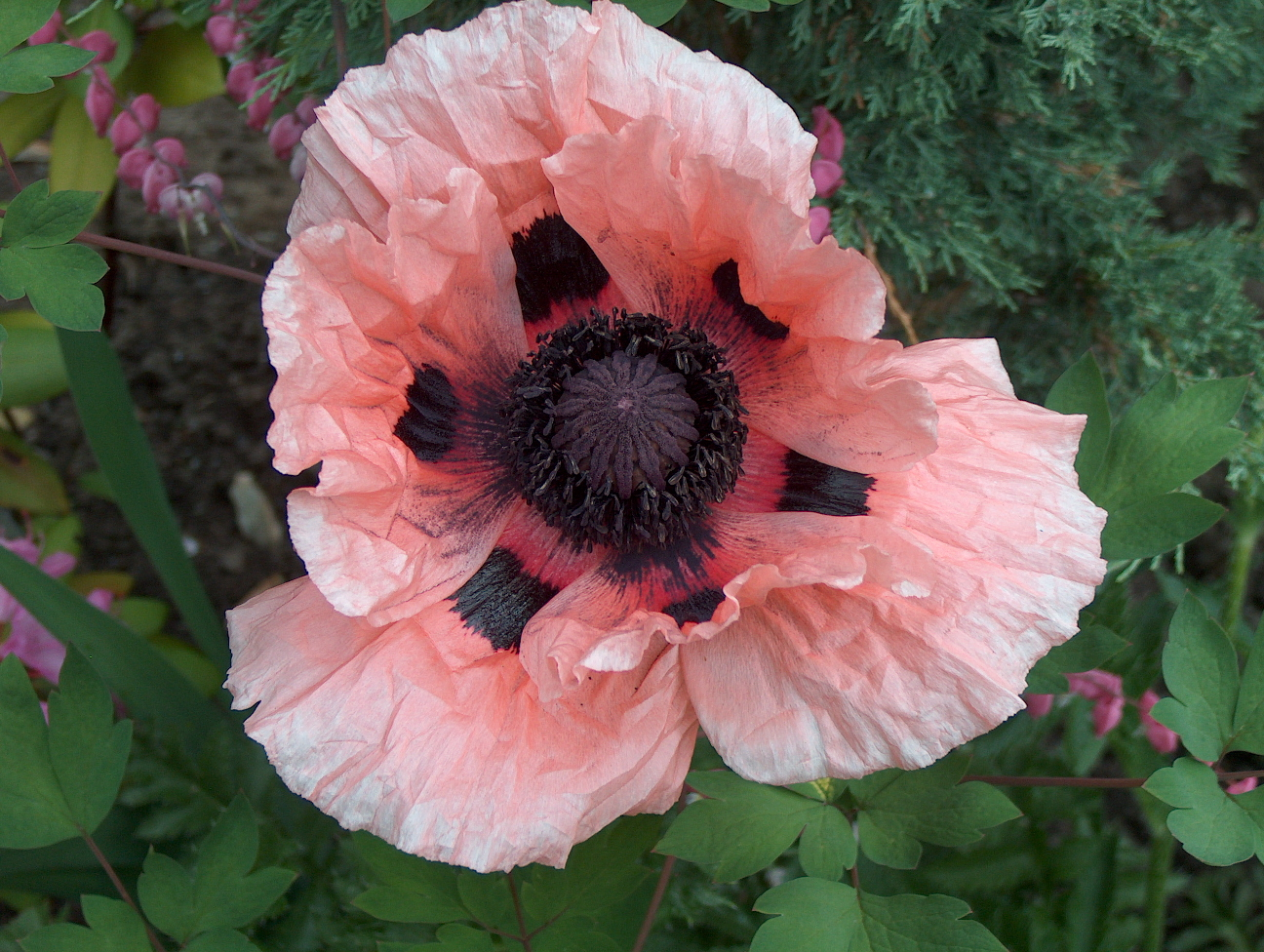
Cedric Morris salmon pink

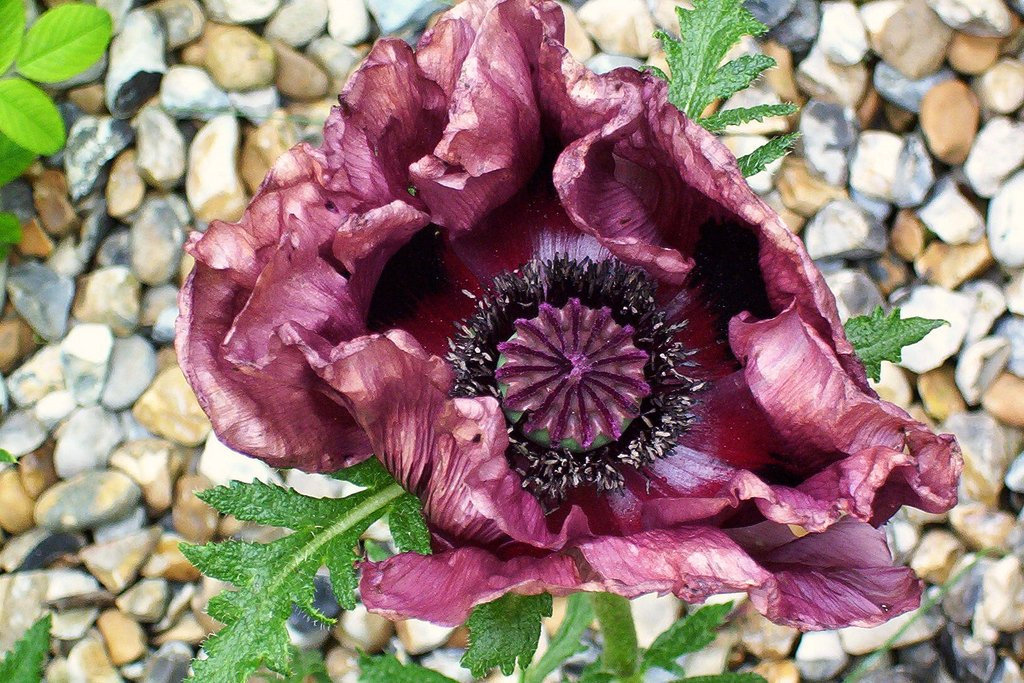
Pattys Plum plum

== See also ==
Oriental Poppies, 1927 painting by Georgia O'Keeffe

== Sources ==
- Garden Guides: Oriental Poppy varieties
