= Bernard Reynolds =

British sculptor (1915–1997)

- Born: 2 June 1915; Norwich, England
- Died: 10 May 1997 (aged 81); Ipswich, England
- Known for: Sculptor
- Spouse(s): Muriel Florence Green, Gwynneth Jane Griffiths
- Children: One son and three daughters
- Awards: Sir Otto Beit Medal
- Elected: Royal Society of Sculptors
- Website: bernardreynoldssculptor.co.uk

Bernard Reynolds (1915–1997) was an esteemed East Anglian artist with a special interest in sculpting. He was born in Norwich and lived for almost fifty years in Ipswich. For although Reynolds is most widely known as a sculptor, he possessed the capacity to be an inspirational teacher as well as an artist, and he fulfilled both of these roles with his own particular kind of integrity. Reynolds was characterised for his quietly rigorous self-imposed discipline to every project he undertook – and due to his multiple pursuits, his projects were many and varied.

== Early life ==
Bernard Reynolds was born on 2 June 1915 in Norwich and lived for almost fifty years in Ipswich. In 1932, at the age of 17, he studied at Norwich School of Art (currently Norwich University of the Arts), where he was inspired by the art master, W.T. Watling. In the final year of his studies, he expressed his inclination towards sculpture. Led by Susan Lascelles for wood engraving, Reynolds became an admirer of Blair Hughes-Stanton. In 1937, he moved to London to continue his studies at the Westminster School of Art. One year later, Reynolds got a post as a naval instruments engineer in Norwich and this endured throughout the war times and thereafter. This wartime experience as an engineer seems to have strengthened rather than repressed his artistic practice. In fact, craftsmanship has influenced his observations vis-a-vis nature and mankind. He constantly expanded the knowledge of materials and techniques in his sculpture studio. As he noted, "I was one who was always interested in things, in specimens, and so that brought me round strongly on the side of sculpture ... the forms of solid nature rather than views of nature." Apropos of his Bird Skull Series, he explained "...it's symbolic of primaeval life which runs through nearly all my themes ... an upthrust of growth and energy."

== Post-War years ==
Reynolds co-founded Norwich Twenty Group in 1944. After the formation of Colchester Art Society in 1946, Cedric Morris proposed Reynolds to join the society where he became a committee member for a period of time. In 1947, he was offered a temporary post as Lecturer in Sculpture at Sheffield College of Art, which transformed to the Psalter Lane campus of Sheffield Hallam University in Sheffield, England and officially closed on 31 August 2008. This was the beginning of his thirty-four years of art school teaching. The following year, he gained the post at Ipswich School of Art, for which his application was very exceptional in showing evidence of his talented techniques. Thanks to him the sculpture course in East Anglia stood out amongst other schools of art by the late fifties. Being always active in the art world, thereon, John and Pam Dan invited Reynolds to share his expertise on a visual arts panel of the Wivenhoe Arts Club just after its opening in 1966. He was an astute critic of art, whose carefully judged opinions were valued by colleagues, friends and students alike. In conjunction with these artists and later Edward Barker of Norwich, Reynolds's multiple pursuits led him to run exhibitions of East Anglian Sculpture since 1949 to 1966. The very first one happened indoors in Ipswich School of Art, while the ones that followed gave breath to parks and castle gardens of East Anglian areas. This highlighted his interest about the natural environment along with arts, which reveal a precise and searching sensibility. Among the outdoor spaces were the Norwich Castle Gardens, Christchurch Park, Ipswich, Mary Potter's Garden, Aldeburgh, Anthony Stokes' Hintlesham Park, Colchester, and the Colchester Castle Gardens. Additionally, once the Corn Exchange, Ipswich, was transformed into an Arts and Entertainment Centre, Reynolds organised the 'Sculpture in Anglia' Exhibitions of 1975, 1978 and 1981. He also participated in shows at King's Lynn, Halesworth and of course London. Unquestionably, his vivid work stood out in all of the above. In 1971, he was elected to membership of the Royal Society of British Sculptors and two years after that he was presented with the Sir Otto Beit Medal by Sir Charles Wheeler.

== Other achievements ==
As a man who "lived by and for his art", Bernard Reynold's deep dedication to his calling was never in question. Apart from his involvement in exhibitions and teaching, Reynolds was commissioned to create sculptures for several buildings in Ipswich. He made cement reliefs on the Castle Hill and Sprites Lane schools, a stone relief on the Eastern Counties Farmers Head Office, the pair of 22 ft. 'Pylons' which flank the entrance to Suffolk College, a 24 ft. stained-glass window in St. Matthew's School and the 14 ft. Ship Fountain Sculpture at the Civic Centre. Because of it, he was awarded the Sir Otto Beit Medal for 1972. It was 'the best piece of sculpture to come to the notice of the R.B.S. as being set up anywhere in the British Commonwealth, excluding London, during that year'. In addition, he made the 8 ft. aluminium sculpture on a theme of plant growth for Messrs Fison's factory at Stanford-le-Hope in Essex.

== Public collections ==
Reynolds work is included in the collections of The Minories (Victor Batte-Lay Foundation), Christchurch Mansion and Norwich Castle Museum and Art Gallery.

== Family ==
Reynolds’ parents were Edward Bernard Reynolds and his wife Mary Emma Cowles. He was married twice, his first wife was Muriel Florence Green, they married in Norwich in 1942 and had one son. His second marriage in Ipswich in 1952 was to the artist Gwynneth Jane Griffiths. they had three daughters including the artist Kate Reynolds who was born in 1961.

== Tributes ==
In April 1991, on the occasion of the private view of an exhibition of Reynolds's sculpture at the Chappel Galleries near Colchester, the painter Colin Moss commented that Reynolds was 'as near, in these days of specialisation, to the archetypal renaissance man as one may find.' ‘He is the kind of man', wrote Hamilton Wood of Bernard, 'who does every job well.'

‘As a man who "lived by and for his art", Reynolds's deep dedication to his calling was never in question. Reynold's contribution to Art in East Anglia, as an artist, colleague and teacher, when combined with his sculpture and drawings, leaves a considerable legacy' . – Pat Hurrell
