= Colchester Art Society =

Arts organisation in Colchester, England

- Location within Essex
- Established: 1946
- Location: Colchester, Essex, England
- Coordinates: 51.889462°N 0.904957°E
- Website: www.colchesterartsociety.co.uk

Colchester Art Society was founded in 1946 by a group of artists who lived in Colchester and the nearby areas, many of whom were also linked to the Colchester School of Art, which is part of Colchester Institute. The aim of the society was and still is the promotion of the visual arts.

== Early history ==
In 1946, a period of renewed optimism after the Second World War, a group of young artists eager to exhibit together founded the Colchester Art Society. Some of its founding members were Roderic Barrett, Edward Bawden, Henry Collins, Reg Hazel, Cedric Morris, John Nash, Joyce Pallot, Rowland Suddaby, and Sylvia St. George.

The Colchester Art Society was founded following a meeting of local artists called by Reg Hazell who at the time was the head of the Colchester School of Arts. The initial meeting was attended by Henry Collins, Roderic Barrett and the children's illustrator Jenny Ward. Following this initial meeting Cedric Morris and Arthur Lett-Haines who ran the East Anglian School of Painting and Drawing joined the group alongside Joyce Pallot, Sylvia St George and others. The painter John Nash RA was invited to be the Society's first president and remained president until his death in 1977. Other presidents of the Society have included Cedric Morris, Roderic Barrett and Anthony Atkinson. Cedric Morris was a key figure who encouraged the activities of the Colchester Art Society.

The first exhibition of the group showed 37 artists and took place in Colchester Castle. The selection committee decided that the criteria to choose the works would be based purely on merit, regardless of the background, experience or popularity of the artist, a policy which remains. The artist and designer Henry Collins designed the posters for the exhibition alongside the society's logo, which is still used today.

At Colchester Art Society's Autumn Exhibition which was held at Colchester Castle in October 1948, Cedric Morris exhibited a portrait of his then-student, Lucian Freud, which is now part of the Tate's collection.

== Permanent Collection ==
Since the early years of the foundation of the Colchester Art Society the President, the Chairman of Selectors, and the members of the Panel select works from the exhibitions in order to purchase them and keep them as part of their Permanent Collection.

The Permanent Collection includes a number of works produced by renowned East Anglian artists from the past half century, including: Roderic Barrett, Arthur Lett-Haines, Lucy Harwood (who also belonged to the East Anglian School of Painting and Drawing), Blair Hughes-Stanton, John Nash (who was the first president of the Colchester Art Society), Cedric Morris, Bernard Reynolds and Valerie Thornton. Nash bequeathed his personal library and some of his paintings and engravings to The Minories, Colchester, who later sold most of the material to the Tate.

== Colchester Art Society Today ==
The Colchester Art Society provides its members the opportunity to exhibit artworks, to have informal debates and discussion, as well as to access relevant information and support. The group welcomes various art forms, such as painting, sculpture, textiles, ceramics, and works on paper, among others.

Together with Firstsite the society organised the exhibition Life with Art: Benton End and the East Anglian School of Painting and Drawing which opened in December 2021.
