= Gertrude Hermes =

English wood engraver, print maker and sculptor (1901–1983)

- Born: Gertrude Anna Bertha Hermes; 18 August 1901; Bickley, Kent, England
- Died: 9 May 1983 (aged 81); Bristol, England
- Education: Leon Underwood
- Known for: Wood-engraving
- Spouse: Blair Hughes-Stanton
- Awards: OBE
- Elected: RA

Gertrude Anna Bertha Hermes (18 August 1901 – 9 May 1983) was a British wood-engraver, sculptor and educator. Hermes was a member of the English Wood Engraving Society (1925–31) and exhibited with the Society of Wood Engravers, the Royal Academy and The London Group during the 1930s.

== Life ==
Gertrude Anna Bertha Hermes was born on 18 August 1901 in Bickley, Kent. Her parents, Louis August Hermes and Helene, née Gerdes, were from Altena, near Dortmund, Germany. In about 1921 she attended the Beckenham School of Art, and in 1922 enrolled at Leon Underwood's Brook Green School of Painting and Sculpture, where other students included Eileen Agar, Raymond Coxon, Henry Moore and Blair Hughes-Stanton, whom she married in 1926; they separated in 1931, and were divorced in 1933.

Hermes was a contributor to the short-lived publication, Island (1931) that was edited by Joseph Bard. She was also a commissioned illustrator for Penguin Books.

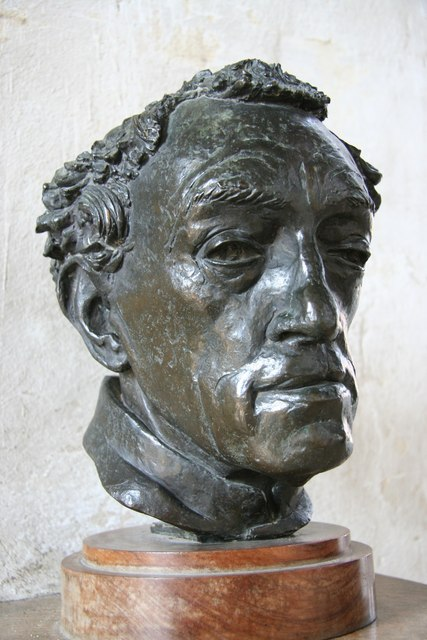
Bronze sculpture of Conrad Noel created by Hermes

Hermes exhibited regularly at the Royal Academy from 1934, and showed at the Venice International Exhibition in 1939. In 1937, Hermes produced a commission for the British Pavilion at the Paris World Fair. She lived and worked in the US and Canada from 1940 to 1945. On her return to England she taught wood engraving and linocutting at the Central School of Art in London (now Central St Martin's) in the late 1940s to early '50s. She also took a drawing class to London Zoo. She taught wood and lino block printing at the Royal Academy Schools, from 1966.

In 1949, Hermes was elected an associate of the Royal Society of Painter-Etchers and Engravers. She was elected Associate of the Royal Academy in 1963 and a full Royal Academician in 1971. In 1961, she was awarded first prize in the Giles Bequest competition at the Victoria and Albert Museum for her linocut Stonehenge. She was appointed an OBE in 1981.

Her work is in many public collections including the Tate, and the National Portrait Gallery as well as private collections, including a c1926 bronze "Swallow" door knocker in the collection of David Bowie sold in 2016.

The Paul Mellon Centre includes Hermes in its 'Sculpting Lives' podcast series 2 episode 3.

Hermes suffered severe stroke in 1969 that meant she was unable to work. She died in Bristol in 1983.

== Notable works ==
- Spring bouquet, 1929, wood engraving
- Leda and the Swan, 1932, sculpture
- The warrior's tomb, 1941, wood engraving
- Bat and Spider, 1932, wood engraving
- Other Cats and Henry, 1952, wood engraving
- Kathleen Raine, 1954, sculpture
- Peacock, 1961, bronze sculpture, for Ordsall High School in Salford

== Exhibitions ==
- 1967 Bronzes and Carvings, Drawings, Wood Engravings, Wood and Lino Block Cuts, 1924–1967 Whitechapel Art Gallery
- 2008 North House Gallery
- 2015 - 2016 Wild Girl: Gertrude Hermes The Hepworth Wakefield. First UK retrospective of Hermes's work in 30 years.
