= Roderic Barrett =

British painter (1920–2000)

- Born: 8 January 1920; Colchester, Essex
- Died: 17 November, 2000; Colchester
- Known for: painting, engraving

Roderic Barrett (8 January 1920 – 17 November 2000) was a British artist born in Colchester, England, known for his paintings and engravings.

== Life ==
Roderic Barrett began his artistic studies at the Central School of Art and Design in London at age 15. He studied there for five years (1936–1940), specializing in wood engraving under John Farleigh, while William Roberts and Bernard Meninsky helped with his tuition. Over time, Barrett moved from engravings to oil paintings, which would become his primary medium later in life.

A lifelong socialist and pacifist, Barrett objected to military service during the Second World War. After the war, he returned to Colchester. In 1947, Barrett began teaching part-time at the Central School in London. In 1968, he moved on to tutor at the Royal Academy School, where he remained until his retirement in 1996. Barrett had a long association with the Colchester Art Society. He was a founding member in 1946 alongside Henry Collins, Lett Haines, John Nash, and Cedric Morris, whom he succeeded as President in 1982 and which position Barrett held until 2000.

== Works ==
From 1939 to 1940, Barrett exhibited in London with the Society of Wood Engravers. He regularly showed with the Colchester Art Society. In 1948, the Hilton Gallery, Cambridge, gave Barrett his first solo show, which included engravings, drawings, and paintings on a Don Quixote theme.

In the spring of 1961, Motif, an art publication, ran an article on Barrett by Cecil Keeling, an admirer and fellow Colchester Art Society member. Among the illustrations published were Chairs and Men, Family of Chairs, Family Bike Ride, Ass and Man, and Fallen Chair. Some of these engraved images also appeared as oils over the years.

During the remaining 40 years of his life, Barrett's pictures were included in a number of mixed exhibitions and solo shows. His first retrospective was held at The Minories, Colchester, in 1973 as part of a series. Barrett's pictures from 1970 onward were a frequent feature of the Summer Exhibition at the Royal Academy. He also began to teach part-time in the Academy Schools.

Since showing at the Beaux Arts gallery, London, in 1954, Barrett exhibited regularly, culminating in a show at the European Parliament gallery, Strasbourg (1995), with important retrospective exhibitions at the Barbican Centre and The Minories, Colchester (1996), and the Bradford Museum (2008). From 1993 to 1998, he was a trustee of the Colchester and District Visual Arts Trust, and he was awarded an honorary doctorate by the University of Essex in 1997.

Barrett advocated for what he described as “authentic” art. He had strong moral views, and he valued work and honesty. His works are part of the collections at the Victoria & Albert Museum and various provincial galleries. Art historian and friend Thomas Puttfarken summed up Barrett's work as demonstrating:

". . .great emotional, as well as formal, power, of rich symbolic suggestiveness and, above all, of deep humanity.”

== Family ==
Barrett's great-grandfather was a nonconformist radical and Chartist. His grandfather was a Liberal and Congregationalist. His father was a Congregationalist, then a Quaker, a propagandist for the Labour Party, and pacifist, who was imprisoned as a conscientious objector during the First World War. When Barrett was ten, his mother died, contributing to his later melancholic disposition. He had three children: Jonathan, Kristin, and Mark.

== Legacy ==
In the words of his biographer David Buckman:

Barrett was one of the most distinctive artists working in Britain in the twentieth century ... he is the opposite of the commercial painter of pretty pictures that fill a gap in the sitting room wall and convey their message in a glance

Or as his friend Thomas Puttfarken wrote:

‘[Barrett was] fundamentally resistant to, and suspicious of, the “isms” of modern and post-modern art since the 1960s, Roderic pursued his own way.

In the same friend and art historian's view:

when Barrett switched from engravings to oils, he retained the mastery and precision of drawing associated with the former. In Barrett's work, seemingly normal objects, such as chairs, tables, buckets and candles take on symbolic meanings, suggestions of myths, the subconscious, or of nightmares. What shines through the appearance of a domestic scene are the fears and anxieties, the slender hopes and the melancholia of the human condition
