= Leon Underwood =

British artist (1890–1975)

- Underwood in his Hammersmith studio, ca 1930
- Born: George Claude Leon Underwood; 25 December 1890; Shepherd's Bush, London
- Died: 9 October 1975 (aged 84); London
- Education: Regent Street Polytechnic; Royal College of Art; Slade School of Fine Art
- Known for: Sculpture, Wood-engraving
- Spouse: Mary Coleman (m.1917)

George Claude Leon Underwood (25 December 1890 – 9 October 1975) was a British artist. Although primarily known as a sculptor, printmaker and painter, he was also an influential teacher and promoter of African art. His travels in Mexico and West Africa had a substantial influence on his art, particularly on the representation of the human figure in his sculptures and paintings. Underwood is best known for his sculptures cast in bronze, carvings in marble, stone and wood, and his drawings. His lifetime's work includes a wide range of media and activities, with an expressive and technical mastery. Underwood did not hold modernism and abstraction in art in high regard and this led to critics often ignoring his work until the 1960s when he came to be viewed as an important figure in the development of modern sculpture in Britain.

== Biography ==
=== Early life ===
Underwood was born in the west London suburb of Shepherd's Bush. He was the eldest of the three sons of George Underwood, a fine art dealer and he attended Hampden Gurney School. From 1907 to 1910 he attended the Regent Street Polytechnic in central London before studying at the Royal College of Art for three years. While still a student in 1911, Underwood was commissioned to paint a mural for the Peace Palace in The Hague. In 1913 he visited Russia to study the depiction of horses in traditional Russian art.

=== World War I ===
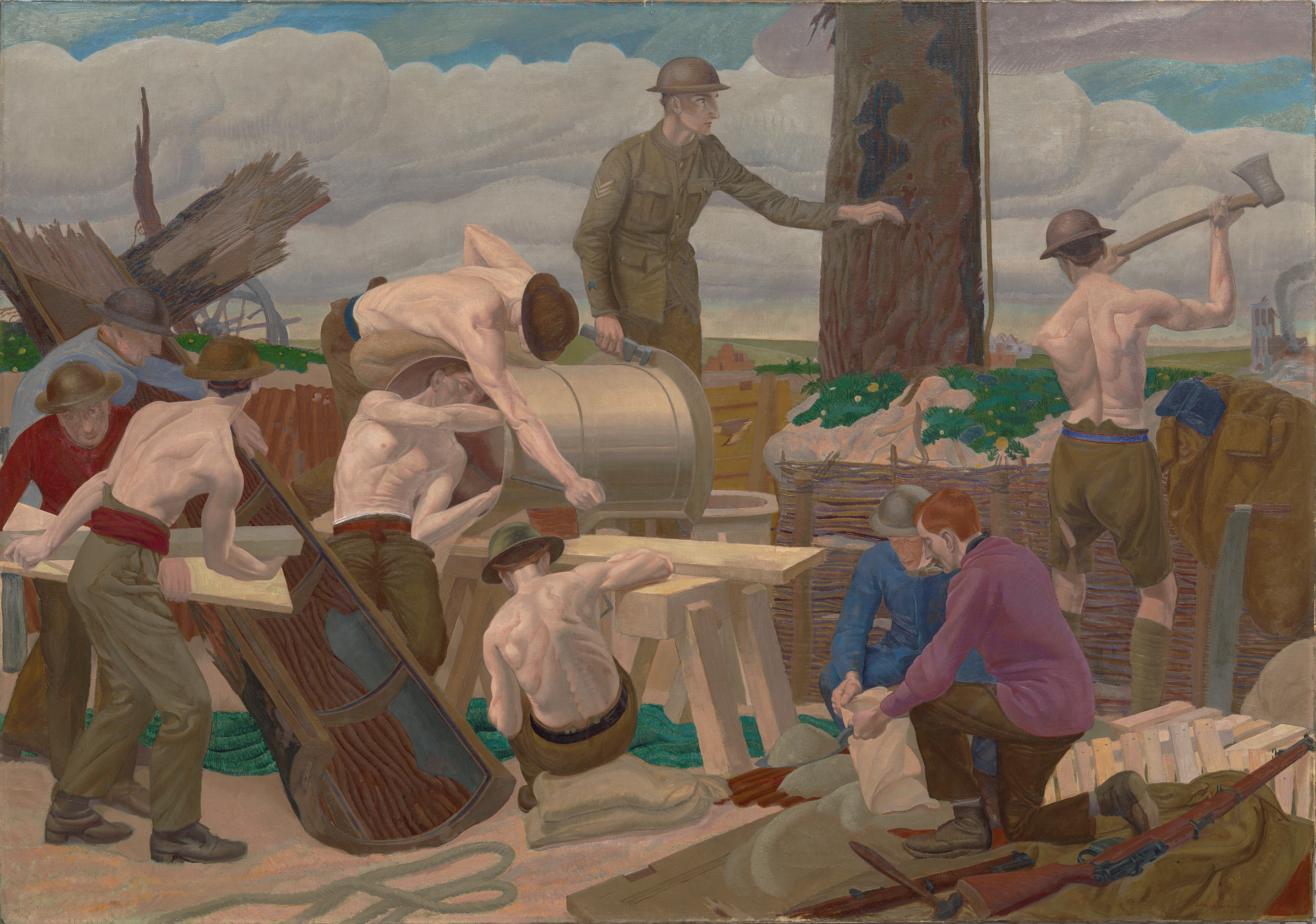
Erecting a Camouflage Tree (1919)

In the First World War, Underwood enlisted in the Royal Horse Artillery before transferring to a field battery unit and then serving as a Captain in the Camouflage Section of the Royal Engineers. He worked with Solomon Joseph Solomon as a camoufleur, creating battlefield observation posts disguised as trees. Underwood's duties on the Western Front included going into No man's land to make detailed drawings of trees which were later replaced with metal replicas used by military observers. He sketched and painted scenes of this work, notably in his 1919 oil painting Erecting a Camouflage Tree, which was intended for the, never built, British national Hall of Remembrance and was in turn purchased by the Imperial War Museum.

=== 1920s and 1930s ===
After the war Underwood attended the Slade School of Art for a year's refresher course and in 1920 received the British Prix de Rome but chose not to go to Italy, instead using the grant to travel elsewhere later in the decade. He painted both formal portraits, such as that of the Canadian war hero G.B. McLean, and Impressionist works such as the 1921 painting Venus in Kensington Gardens. In his Hammersmith studio Underwood set up a private art school, the Brook Green School, which he ran, intermittently, until 1938. At Brook Green, Underwood initially, concentrated on teaching printmaking with woodcutting but also began making sculptures. In 1925, with some of his past pupils, Underwood created the English Wood-Engraving Society to promote the art form. Later in his career, between 1935 and 1945 Underwood created a significant number of colour linocuts.

In 1922 Underwood had his first solo exhibition at the Chenil Gallery in London. An exhibition of his sculptures was held in 1924. He also taught a life drawing class at the Royal College of Art from 1920 until 1923 when he resigned and travelled to Paris and Iceland. In 1925 he became the first contemporary artist to spend time examining the cave paintings at Altamira in Spain. Underwood spent 1926 in the United States where he published an illustrated book of verse, Animalia, illustrated some volumes by others and also painted and made engravings. In Greenwich Village he opened a life-drawing school. In 1927 he went to Mexico, spending five months travelling and studying Aztec and Mayan art forms.

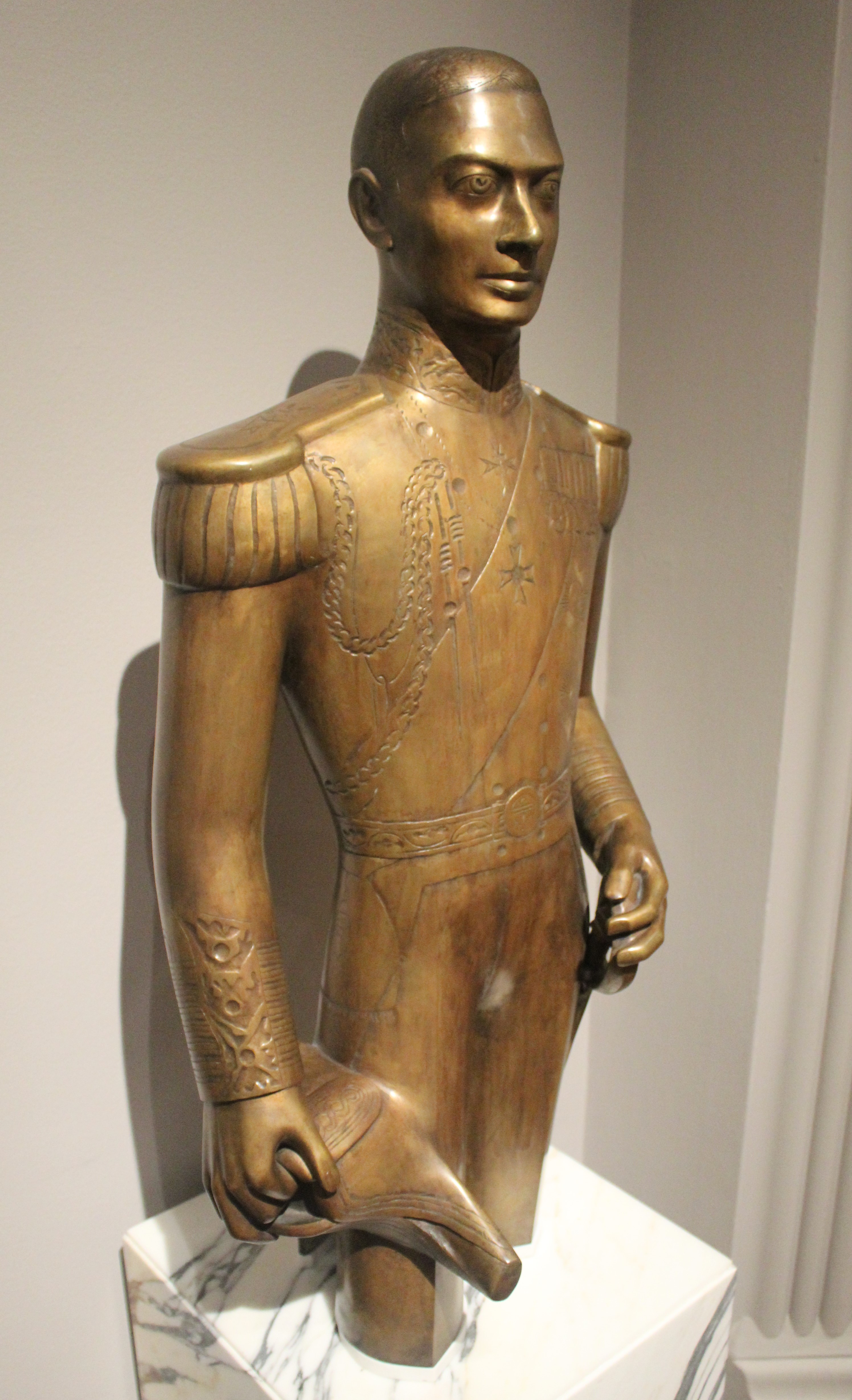
King George VI by Underwood

After returning to England in late 1928 Underwood made a number of paintings on Mexican themes, including imagined portraits of Montezuma II and Hernán Cortés, the latter holding a stone heart in front of a ruined castle. He also created several surrealist paintings, six of which were shown at the first, and only, exhibition of The Neo Society held at the Godfrey Phillips Gallery in London in May 1930. With funding from Eileen Agar, Underwood co-founded a graphical quarterly magazine, The Island, in 1931 which, despite contributions from Henry Moore, Agar, CRW Nevinson and Mahatma Gandhi was only published for four issues. From 1932 to 1934, Underwood made a series of sculptures of dancing figures including Herald of New Day, the plaster cast of which is now in the Tate collection. In 1934 he published an artistic manifesto, Art for Heaven's Sake: Notes on a Philosophy of Art. Underwood was always convinced that subject matter formed a fundamental role behind the power of both his own and primitive art, and had no belief in subject-less or purely abstract form in his own work. Underwood's 1935 lignum vitae carving African Madonna, or Black Virgin, was inspired by a Bantu carving and is sited in St George's Cathedral, Cape Town.

Underwood's 1937 bronze sculpture of King George VI, now in the National Portrait Gallery, London, had originally been intended to be of Edward VIII but was reworked after the abdication of December 1936. When first shown in public, the Buckingham Palace authorities asked that it be removed from view. In 1938, Underwood closed the Brook Green School. During the School's existence, its students had included Henry Moore, Eileen Agar, Gertrude Hermes, Blair Hughes-Stanton, Raymond Coxon, Edna Ginesi and Roland Vivian Pitchforth. Moore later spoke of his indebtedness to Underwood's teaching.

=== World War II ===
From 1939 to 1942, during World War II, Underwood worked at the civil defence camouflage centre at Leamington Spa. In 1944, having long collected and studied non-Western art, he undertook a lecture tour, sponsored by the British Council, of west Africa and on his return to Britain wrote three books on aspects of African art. These included a study of the Ife and Benin heads, Bronzes of West Africa which showed a pioneering appreciation of their artistic significance and his understanding of their relationship to the culture and technology from which they originated. Underwood had begun collecting African art in 1919 and, after his 1944 tour, had acquired over 550 pieces including several significant works by Yoruba artists, including sculptures by Olowe of Ise. Some of these works Underwood later sold to the British Museum while others were eventually acquired by National Museum of African Art and the Metropolitan Museum of Art in the United States. His access to the cave paintings of Altamira in Spain ignited his "New Philosophy" with regard to this interrelationship of the expressiveness and technology of primitive art.

=== Later life ===
From 1948 onwards, Underwood cast his bronze sculptures in his own studio and throughout the 1950s, concentrated on his sculpture and on promoting his theories and philosophy of art. In 1961 Underwood was elected an Honorary Member of the Royal Society of Sculptors and further recognition followed in 1969 when the first full-scale retrospective of his work was held at The Minories in Colchester. The art historian John Rothenstein wrote in the introduction to that exhibition that Underwood was "..the most versatile artist at work in Britain today..". However it was to be over forty years before the next major retrospective of his work was held, in 2015 at the Pallant House Gallery. This lack of attention has been attributed to the range and versatility of Underwood's output which, across the various media he worked in, lacked a common recognisable style that was easy to promote and also to his, sometimes, complex and esoteric philosophies and theories on art.

Underwood was married to Mary Coleman. They first met in 1911 at the Royal College of Art, married in 1917 and their first child was born in 1919. They had two sons, Garth (a zoologist) and John, and one daughter, Jean.

== Public commissions ==
- Tempera mural for Shell canteen London, 1954
- Relief panel (a larger version of "Light Industries and Secretariat", 1953) for the Commercial Development Building, 49-59 Old Street, London, EC1V 9HX, 1955
- Reredos, side chapel and stained glass window, St Michael and All Angels, New Marston, Oxford, 1955
- Bronze candlesticks and crucifix Ampleforth Abbey, 1958.

== Selected publications ==
- Animalia. Payson and Clarke, 1926.
- The Siamese Cat. Brentano's, 1928.
- The Red Tiger, 1929, by Phillip Russell, illustrated by Underwood, an account of their joint travels in Mexico.
- Art for Heaven's Sake: Notes on a Philosophy of Art, 1934
- Figures in Wood of West Africa. Alec Tiranti, 1947.
- Masks of West Africa. Alec Tiranti, 1948.
- Bronzes of West Africa. Alec Tiranti, 1949.
- Bronze Age Technology in Western Asia and Northern Europe, 1958.

== Museums and public collections ==
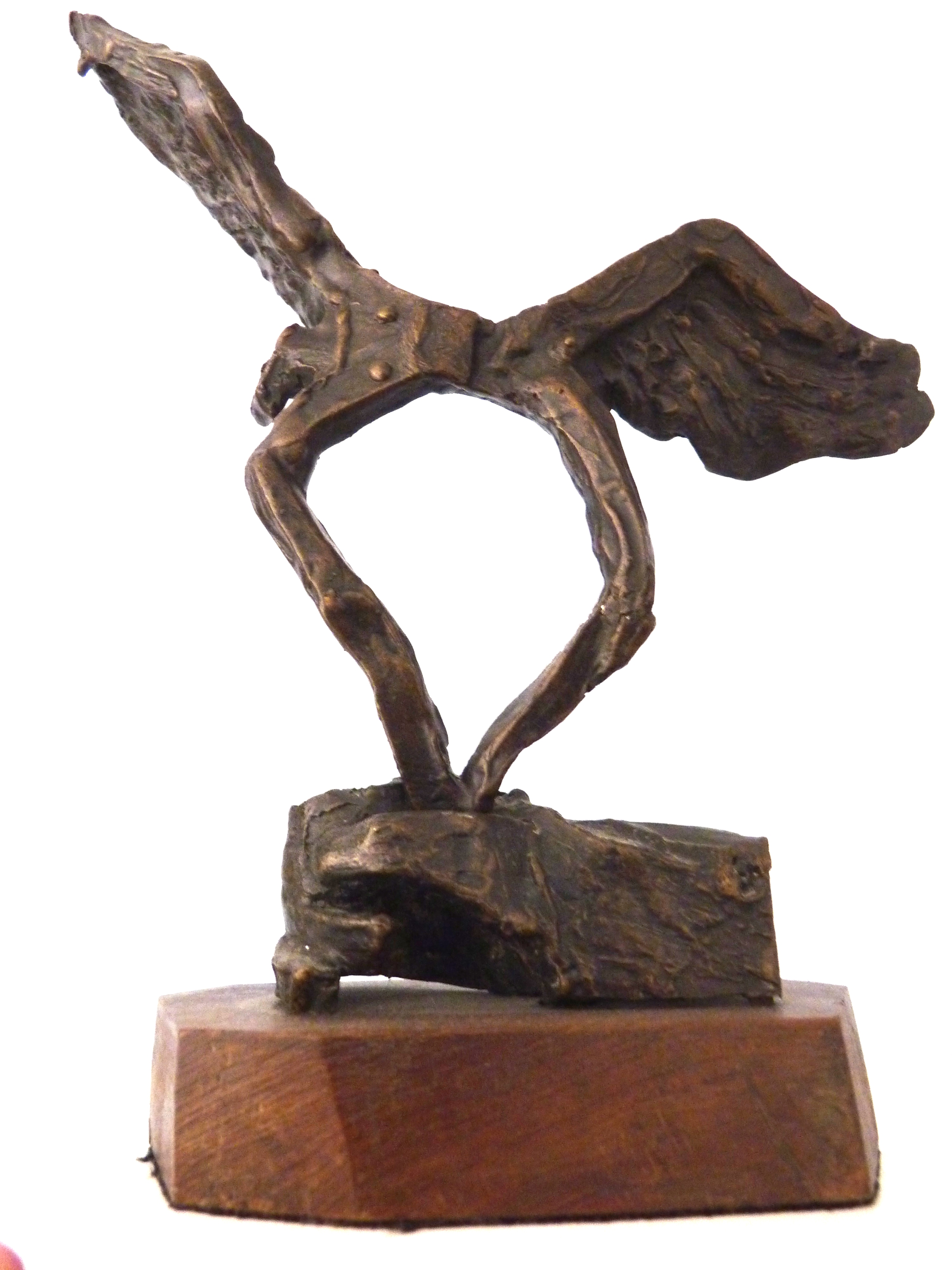
Bronze model

Public collections holding works by Underwood include

- the Courtauld Institute of Art, London (39 works)
- the Tate Gallery, London (8 works)
- the National Portrait Gallery, London, (4 works)
- the Ingram Collection, The Lightbox, Woking (2 works)
- the Victoria and Albert Museum, London, archive of 206 drawings and sketches
- the Ashmolean Museum, Oxford
- the National Museum Cardiff (two works)
- the British Council Collection, London, (five works)
- Hammersmith and Fulham Archives (15 works)
- The Victor Batte-Lay Trust Collection at The Minories (two works)
- The Brooklyn Museum (three works)
- Leamington Spa Art Gallery & Museum (six works)
- the Henry Moore Institute in Leeds hold archives of Underwood's correspondence and other material.

== Exhibitions ==
- Leon Underwood, Mexican Wood engravings. St George's Gallery, 1928
- Leon Underwood, Mexican watercolours. St George's Gallery, 1929
- Sculpture, Paintings, Drawings and Engravings by Leon Underwood. Leicester Galleries, 1934
- Sculpture in the Home. Arts Council, 1946
- Leon Underwood. Beaux Arts Gallery, 1953
- Bronzes and Wood Engravings by Leon Underwood. Thomas Agnew & Sons, 1973
- Leon Underwood, Mexico and After. National Museum of Wales, 1979
- Modern British Sculpture. Royal Academy of Arts, 2011
- Mexico A revolution in art 1910-1940. Royal Academy of Arts, 2013
- The Sensory War 1914-2014. Manchester Art Gallery, 2014
- Leon Underwood, Figure and Rhythm. Pallant House Gallery, 2015
- Becoming Henry Moore. Henry Moore Foundation, 2017
