= Edna Ginesi =

British artist

- Edna Ginesi c.1926-7
- Born: February 15, 1902; Leeds, United Kingdom
- Died: July 17, 2000 (aged 98)
- Education: Leeds College of Art; Royal College of Art
- Known for: Painting
- Spouse: Raymond Coxon

Edna "Gin" Ginesi (15 February 1902 – 17 July 2000) was a British painter, specialising in landscapes and nature studies. Born in Leeds, she was a contemporary of the sculptors Henry Moore and Barbara Hepworth. She studied at the Royal College of Art, and lived for most of her adult life in London. As well as working as an artist, Ginesi taught at Bradford School of Art and Chelsea School of Art.

== Early life and education ==
Ginesi was born in Leeds in 1902, and was of Italian descent. She studied at Leeds School of Art from 1920, before going to the Royal College of Art where she studied painting from 1921 to 1925. At the RCA, she was part of the "Leeds Table", along with her future husband Raymond Coxon, sculptors Henry Moore and Barbara Hepworth, and the painter Vivian Pitchforth; at this time she also studied informally with Leon Underwood. In 1924, Ginesi was awarded a West Riding Travelling Scholarship, which enabled her to visit the Netherlands, Belgium, Italy, and France.

== Career ==
After graduating from the Royal College, Ginesi taught for a year at Bradford School of Art, before settling in Hammersmith with her husband, Raymond Coxon, whom she married in 1926. In 1927, she formed the British Independent Society with Coxon, Moore, and Underwood. She exhibited with the London Group – of which she was later a member – in 1928, and had her first solo exhibition in 1932 at the Zwemmer Gallery. She was also a member of the "Twenties Group" founded by Lucy Wertheim. In the 1930s, she taught at Chelsea School of Art and designed sets for the Camargo Ballet. During the Second World War, Ginesi worked as an ambulance driver, and, with Coxon, taught painting in Guildford. A retrospective of Ginesi's work was exhibited in 1956 in Cartwright Hall, Bradford. In 1985, she exhibited along with Raymond Coxon at the Michael Parkin Gallery in London. She also exhibited work at the Royal Academy and in America.

Ginesi's paintings were generally representational, with her style becoming more abstract from the 1960s onward. She mostly worked on landscapes and nature studies.

== Personal life ==
In 1922, Ginesi became engaged to the painter Raymond Coxon, who she had met at Leeds School of Art; she married him in 1926. The sculptor Henry Moore was best man at their wedding, and gave the couple his Head of a Virgin (1922) as a wedding present. Coxon and Ginesi lived in Hammersmith, London, over 60 years; from 1938 they also owned a studio in Sussex.

== Works cited ==
- Berthould, Roger (2003), The Life of Henry Moore, Walter de la Mare
- Garlake, Margaret (2006), "Two-faced: Henry Moore's Head of the Virgin, 1922", Sculpture Journal, 15 (2): 269–272, doi:10.3828/sj.15.2.7
- Parkin, Michael (18 February 1997), "Obituary: Raymond Coxon", Independent
- Shone, Richard (1985), "Twentieth-Century Exhibitions, London", The Burlington Magazine, 127 (984)
- Stephens, Chris (1998), Edna Ginesi: Biography, Tate
- "Raymond Coxon", The Times, p. 21, 18 February 1997
- Turnbull, Harry (1976). Artists of Yorkshire: A Short Dictionary. Thornton Gallery.
