= Raymond Coxon =

British artist (1896-1997)

- Born: 18 August 1896; Hanley, Staffordshire
- Died: 31 January 1997 (aged 100); Rowfant, West Sussex
- Education: Leeds School of Art, Royal College of Art
- Known for: Painting, murals
- Spouse: Edna Ginesi

Raymond James Coxon (18 August 1896 – 31 January 1997) was an English artist. He enrolled at the Leeds School of Art, the Royal College of Art, and became a teacher in the Richmond School of Art. The creative work of his long and successful career—singly and in various art groups—included landscape and portrait painting, abstract works, creating church murals and serving as a war artist during World War II. In particular he was known for the bold style of his figure and portrait work. After World War Two, his paintings became more abstract.

== Life and work ==
Coxon was born in Hanley, Staffordshire, the second of seven children to James and Georgina Coxon. When he completed his schooling, at the local Leek High School, Coxon joined the British Army. He applied to join the Artists Rifles but was rejected and joined the cavalry section of the Machine Gun Corps with whom he served, and fought, in Egypt and Palestine throughout World War I. While abroad he painted miniatures in watercolours which he sent home to his family.

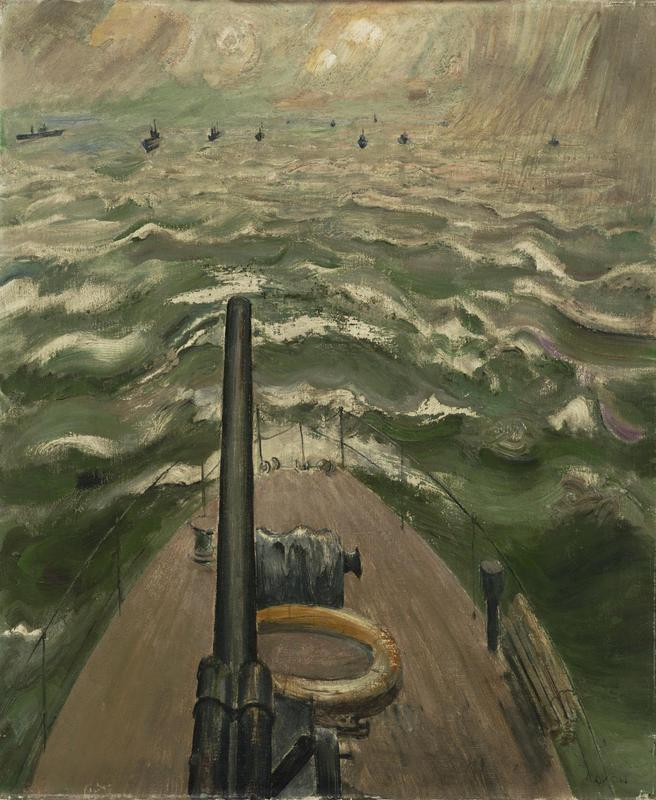
Convoy (1942) (Art.IWM ART LD 2161)

After he was discharged from the Army, Coxon enrolled at the Leeds School of Art, now the Leeds College of Art. While he was there, between 1919 and 1921, he not only met his future wife but also became friends with a fellow student, Henry Moore. In 1922 Moore and Coxon visited France and met a number of artists there, including Pierre Bonnard and Aristide Maillol. Coxon continued his studies in London at the Royal College of Art between 1921 and 1925 under Sir William Rothenstein. For his RCA Diploma submission, Coxon produced a mural based on Masaccio's Expulsion from the Garden of Eden. Coxon took a teaching post at the Richmond School of Art in 1925 and in 1926 he married Edna Ginesi, with Moore acting as his best-man. Coxon would later perform the same service for Moore when he married Irina Radetsky in July 1929. In 1927 the Coxons, Moore, Leon Underwood and others formed a short-lived artists grouping called the British Independent Society. The following year Coxon had his first one-man show at the Cooling Galleries. He became a member of the London Group in 1931 and of the Chiswick Group in 1938.

Early in World War II, Coxon offered his services to the War Artists' Advisory Committee, WAAC, and in particular volunteered to return to Palestine as a war artist. That offer was refused but WAAC commissioned Coxon to produce some paintings of Army subjects in Britain, after which they purchased several other pieces from him. Independently of WAAC, Coxon received commissions from the Royal Navy and Army that saw him spend time on a corvette on convoy duty, join a river patrol on the Thames and witness parachutists making training jumps. He also produced some fine portraits during the war, notably of the Victoria Cross recipient Pip Gardner and also a portrait of his own wife in her ambulance service uniform.

After the war, Coxon, and Ginesi, continued to paint and travel. His paintings became more abstract and less representational but the main theme of his work remained, as it had been in the 1930s, the depiction of nature and of landscapes. Coxon and Ginesi held a joint show at the Parkin Gallery in 1985 and he was the subject of a retrospective exhibition at the Potteries Museum & Art Gallery in 1987 and a memorial exhibition at the Walton Gallery in 2001.
