= Herbert Hughes-Stanton =

British painter

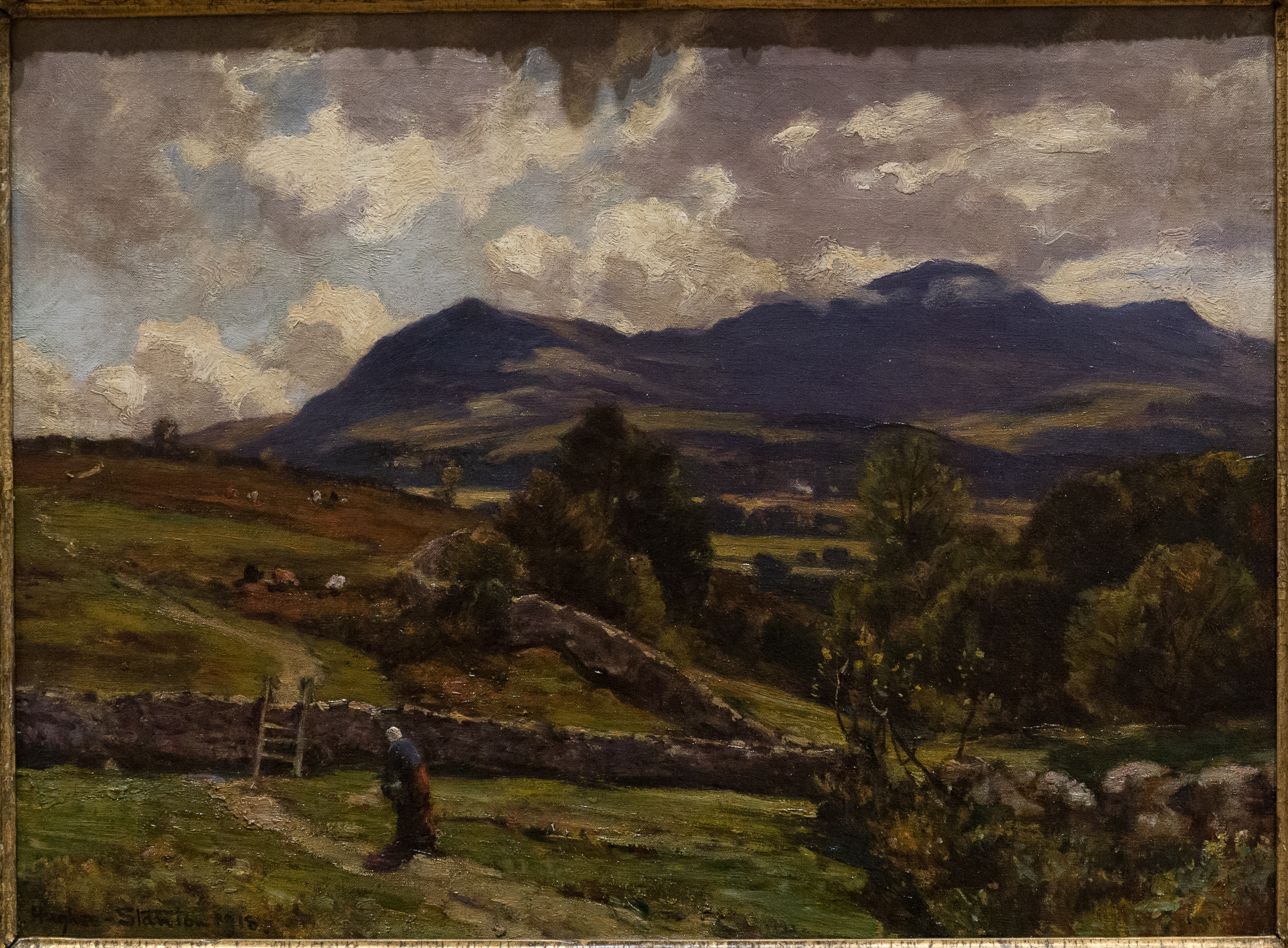
Cader Idris, North Wales (1918)

Sir Herbert Edwin Pelham Hughes-Stanton RA RWS (21 November 1870 – 2 August 1937) was a British watercolour and oil painter, predominantly of landscapes. He was elected an Associate of the Royal Academy in November 1913, elected a full Royal Academician in 1920 (or 1919) and knighted in 1923. He was an Officier l’ordre Leopold II and a member of the Royal Watercolour Society from 1909 or 1915 and its President from 1920 until 1936.

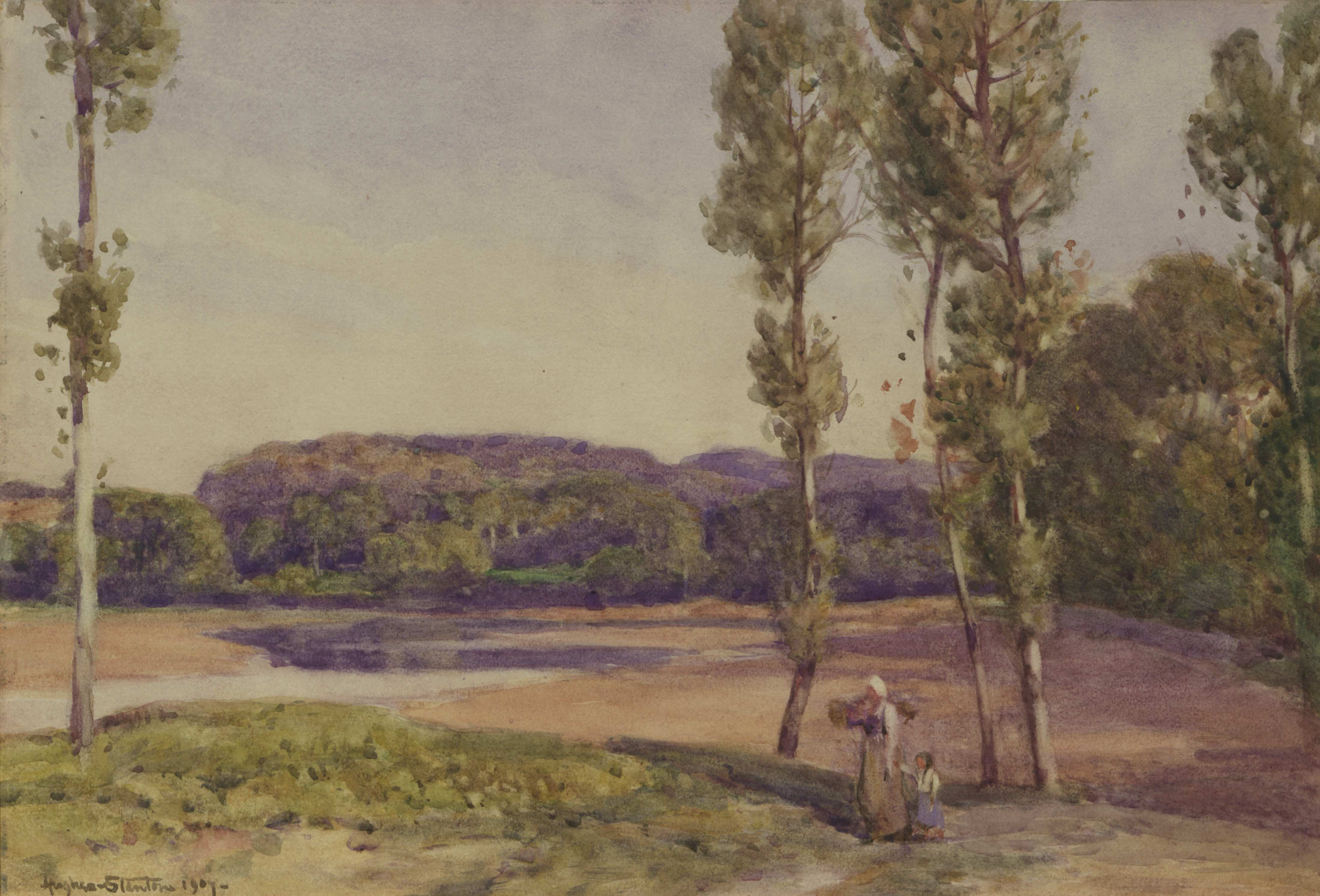
The Tidal River, Aberdeen Archives, Gallery & Museums Collection

He was born in Chelsea, London, son of William Hughes who was of Welsh descent, a still-life painter, and educated in Corsham, near Bath.

His first paintings were exhibited in 1886; and he exhibited regularly at the Paris Salon, Royal Academy (from 1897), Grosvenor Gallery (from 1887), New Gallery, and Royal Institute of Oil Painters, and later at the Fine Art Society. He was awarded gold medals at a Paris Salon in 1907 and 1908.

As of 2014, Hughes-Stanton's works are (or have previously been) held by collections including the Tate; the Welsh National Gallery; National Musée, Buenos Aires; Musée Royal, Florence; Musée Modern, Rome; Barcelona Museum; Royal Gallery, Tokyo; Art Gallery of New South Wales, Sydney, Australia; Art Gallery of South Australia, Adelaide; Melbourne Museum; Auckland Museum; and the Wellington Gallery; and in the permanent galleries of Manchester, Liverpool, Bradford, Brighton, Aberdeen and Oldham. A Pasturage among the Dunes, exhibited in New Gallery, was purchased for the Chantry Bequest in 1908.

He married in 1898 and had three daughters and one son. His son was the wood-engraver Blair Hughes-Stanton and his brother Talbot Hughes also painted.

Hughes-Stanton died in Kensington, London, on 2 August 1937. A memorial to him lies in St James's Church, Piccadilly.

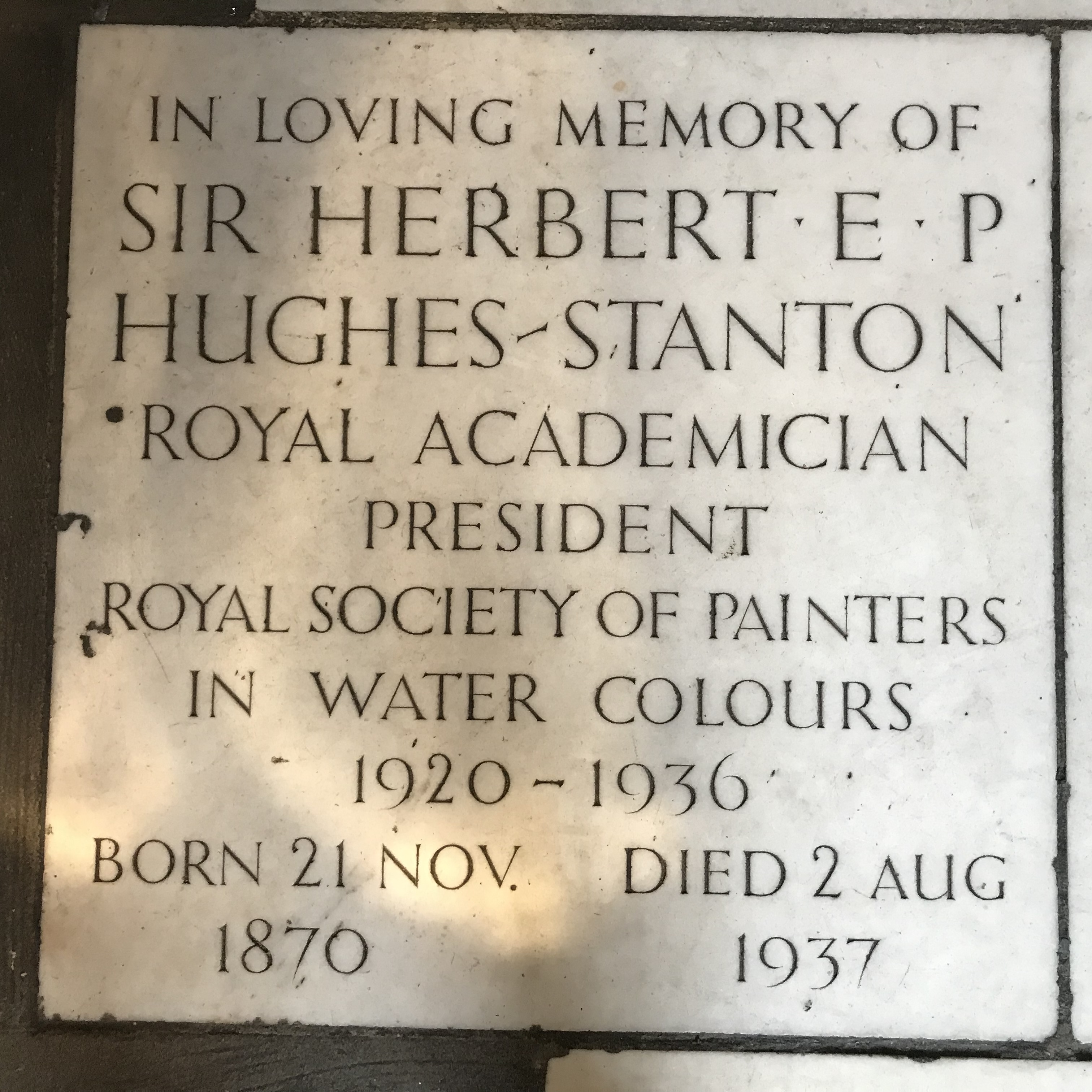
There is a memorial to Herbert Hughes-Stanton in St James's Church, Piccadilly.
