= John Nash (artist) =

British artist (1893–1977)

John Nash CBE RA
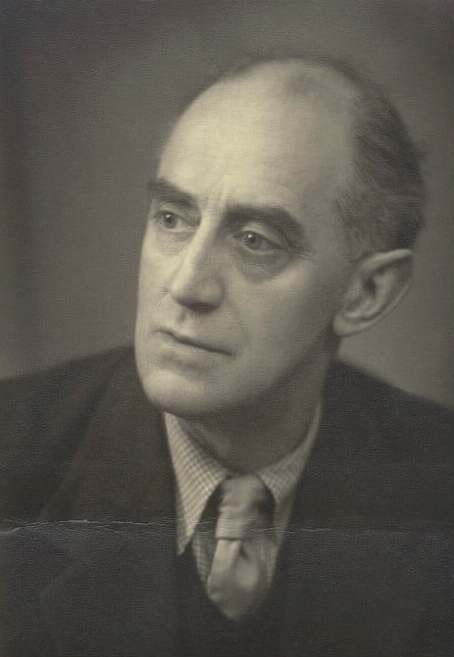
- Nash in 1951
- Born: John Northcote Nash; 11 April 1893; London, England
- Died: 23 September 1977 (aged 84); Colchester, England
- Known for: Painting, engraving, illustration
- Notable work: The Cornfield, Over the Top
- Spouse: Dorothy Christine Kulenthal
- Elected: Founder member of The London Group

John Northcote Nash CBE, RA (11 April 1893 – 23 September 1977) was a British painter of landscapes and still-lifes, and a wood engraver and illustrator, particularly of botanic works. He was the younger brother of the artist Paul Nash.

== Early life ==
Over The Top (1918; Art. IWM ART 2243)

Nash was born in London, the younger son of lawyer William Harry Nash who served as recorder of Abingdon and Caroline Maude Jackson. His mother came from a family with a naval tradition; she was mentally unstable and died in a mental asylum in 1910. In 1901 the family moved to Iver Heath, Buckinghamshire. Nash was educated at Langley Place in Slough and afterwards at Wellington College, Berkshire. He particularly enjoyed botany, but was unsure which career path to take. At first he worked as a newspaper reporter for the Middlesex and Berkshire Gazette, in 1910.

John Nash had no formal art training, but was encouraged by his brother, Paul, who was a student at the Slade School of Art, to develop his abilities as a draughtsman. John's early work was in watercolour and included Biblical scenes, comic drawings and landscapes. A joint exhibition with Paul at the Dorien Leigh Gallery, London, in 1913 was successful, and John was invited to become a founder-member of the London Group in 1914. He was an important influence on the work of the artist Dora Carrington (with whom he was in love), and some of her works have been mistaken for his in the past.

== First World War ==
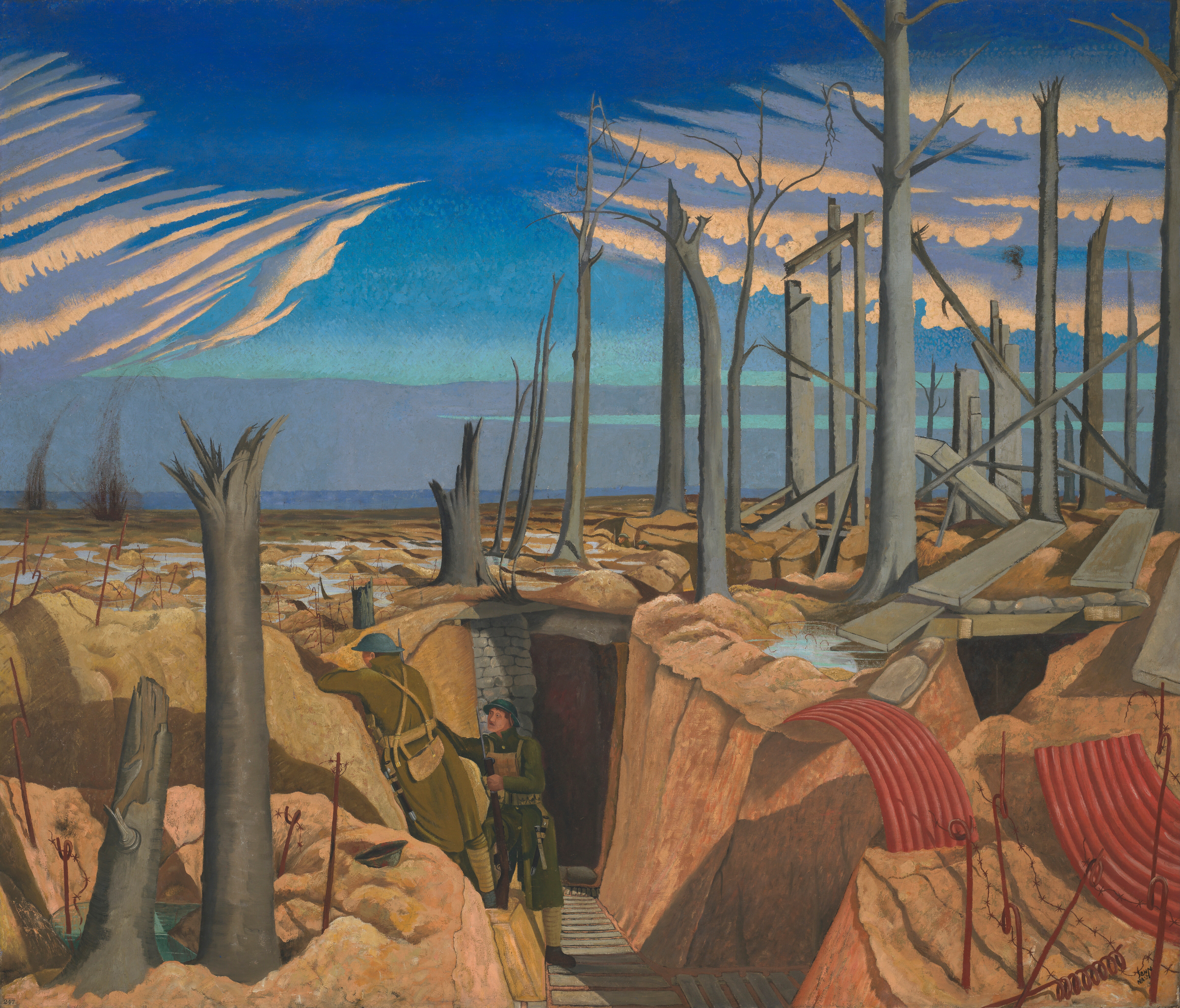
Oppy Wood, 1917, Evening. (Art. IWM ART 2243)

In 1915 Nash joined Harold Gilman in Robert Bevan's Cumberland Market Group and in May that year exhibited with Gilman, Charles Ginner and Robert Bevan at the Goupil Gallery.

Nash's health initially prevented him enlisting at the outbreak of the First World War but from November 1916 to January 1918 he served in the Artists Rifles, the unit that his brother had joined in 1914 before taking a commission in the Hampshire Regiment. He served as a sergeant at the battle of Passchendaele and at the battle of Cambrai. On the recommendation of his brother, Paul worked as an official war artist from 1918.

In 1914 Nash began painting in oils with the encouragement of Harold Gilman, whose meticulous craftsmanship influenced his finest landscapes. Nash's most famous painting is Over the Top (oil on canvas, 79.4 × 107.3 cm), now hanging in the Imperial War Museum. It is an image of the counter-attack at Welsh Ridge on 30 December 1917, during which the 1st Battalion Artists' Rifles left their trenches and pushed towards Marcoing near Cambrai. Of the eighty men, sixty-eight were killed or wounded during the first few minutes. Nash was one of the twelve spared by the shell-fire, and painted this picture three months later. The Cornfield, held by the Tate Gallery, was the first painting Nash completed that did not depict the theme of war. The picture with its ordered view of the landscape and geometric treatment of the corn stooks prefigures his brother Paul's Equivalents for the Megaliths. Nash said that he and Paul used to paint for their own pleasure only after six o'clock, when their work as war artists was over for the day; hence the long shadows cast by the evening sun across the middle of the painting.

== Post-war career ==
The Cornfield, 1918, oil on canvas, 68.6 × 76.2 cm, Tate Gallery

Nash married Carrington's friend Dorothy Christine Kühlenthal in May 1918. She was the daughter of a German chemist who had settled in Gerrards Cross, Buckinghamshire, and had studied at the Slade. Their only child, William, was born in 1930; he died when he fell out of the back of a moving car in 1935, aged 4.

From 1918 to 1921, Nash lived at Gerrard's Cross, with summer expeditions to the Chiltern Hills and Gloucestershire. In 1919 he became a member of the New English Art Club, and in 1921 he became the first art critic for The London Mercury. He moved to Meadle, near Princes Risborough, also in Buckinghamshire, in 1921, which remained his permanent home until 1944. He frequently visited the valley of the River Stour in Essex and Suffolk, where he bought a summer cottage.

After the First World War, Nash's efforts went mainly into painting landscapes. Eric Newton, the art historian said of him 'If I wanted a foreigner to understand the mood of a typical English landscape, I would show him Nash's best watercolours." Emotions concerning the war, however, continued to linger for many years; and this was depicted in his landscape painting. This is particularly evident in The Moat, Grange Farm, Kimble, oil on canvas, exhibited in 1922. In this brooding landscape the trees and their tendril-like branches envelope the entire picture plane.The dark subtle colours and evening light give the painting a claustrophobic atmosphere. This painting, completed a few years after the war, is characterised by a sense of bleak desolation that suggests the profound introspection that for many followed the devastation of the war. Although he had a great love of nature Nash often used natural subjects to convey powerful and sensitive thoughts concerning the human condition. He was close friends with the writer Ronald Blythe, who dedicated his best-selling book Akenfield to the artist, and who shared his love of the unmanaged forest where fallen trees were left to create their own chaos.

In 1923 Nash became a member of the Modern English Water-colour Society. In 1923 he worked in Dorset and in 1924 in Bath and Bristol. From 1924 to 1929 he taught at The Ruskin School of Drawing and Fine Art (Oxford). In 1927, he wrote and illustrated a book on Poisonous Plants. From 1934 to 1940 he taught at the Royal College of Art in London, working on wood engravings and lithographs. In 1939 he visited the Gower Peninsula, near Swansea – the first of many visits to Gower and other parts of Wales.

Nash was also an accomplished printmaker. He was a founder member of the Society of Wood Engravers in 1920. He produced woodcuts and wood engravings first as illustrations to literary periodicals, and then increasingly as illustrations for books produced by the private presses; these include Jonathan Swift's Directions to Servants (Golden Cockerel Press, 1925) and Edmund Spenser's The Shepheard's Calendar (Cresset Press, 1930). His interest in botanical subjects is shown by his illustrations to H. E. Bates Flowers and Faces (Golden Cockerel Press, 1935) and Bob Gathorne-Hardy's Wild Flowers in Britain (Batsford 1938).

== Later life ==
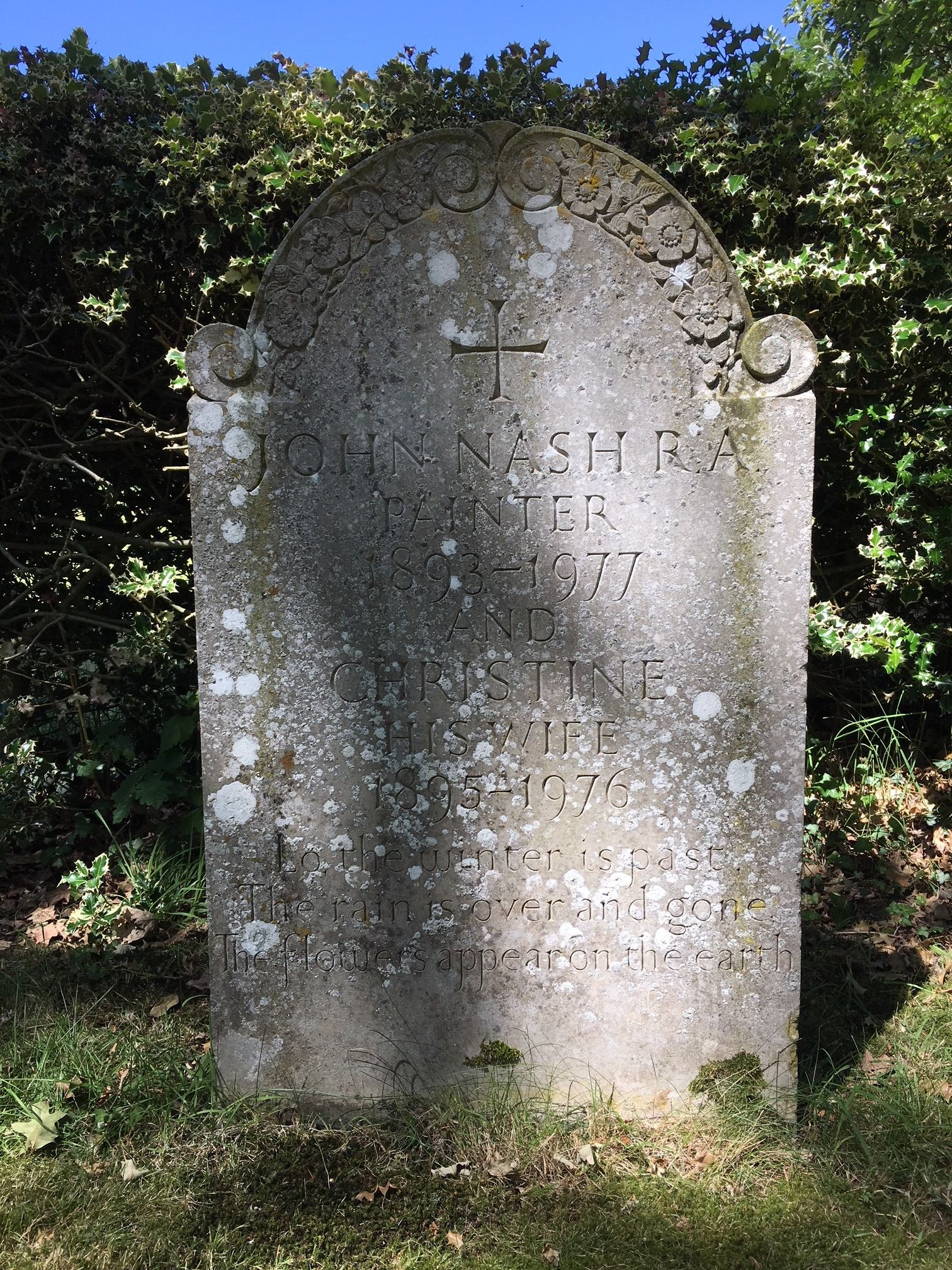
Nash's grave in the churchyard of St Andrew's, Wormingford, Essex

At the beginning of the Second World War Nash served in the Observer Corps, moving to the Admiralty in 1940 as an official war artist with the rank of Captain in the Royal Marines. He was promoted acting major in 1943, and relinquished his commission in November 1944.

After the war, Nash lived at Wormingford, in the Stour Valley in Essex, where he had bought the Elizabethan yeoman's house, Bottengoms in 1944. Nash joined the staff of the Royal College of Art in 1945 and continued to teach there and later at the Flatford Mill field studies centre. When in Essex, Nash taught at Colchester Art School and in 1946, along with Henry Collins, Cedric Morris, Lett Haines and Roderic Barrett, became one of the founders of Colchester Art Society and later the Society's president. Nash bequeathed his personal library and several of his paintings and engravings to The Minories, Colchester, who later sold most of the material to the Tate. Nash became an Associate of the Royal Academy in 1940 and a full member in 1951. He became a Commander of the Order of the British Empire (CBE) in 1964. His retrospective exhibition at the Royal Academy in 1967 was the first for a living painter.

Nash suffered from severe arthritis in later years. His wife died in 1976; they had been married for over 58 years. Nash died on 23 September 1977, in Colchester. They are both buried at St Andrew's church in Wormingford. The author Ronald Blythe inherited Bottengoms from Nash.

== Notes ==
- Ronald Blythe, 'Nash, John Northcote (1893–1977)’, Oxford Dictionary of National Biography, Oxford University Press, 2004; online edn, May 2006 accessed 26 June 2014
