= Over the Top (painting) =

Painting by John Nash

Over The Top
- Artist: John Nash
- Year: 1918
- Medium: Oil on canvas
- Dimensions: 79.8 cm × 108 cm (31.4 in × 43 in)
- Location: Imperial War Museum, London
- Website: © IWM (Art.IWM ART 1656)

"Over The Top". 1st Artists' Rifles at Marcoing, 30th December 1917 is a 1918 oil-on-canvas painting by John Nash. It depicts a counter-attack on Welsh Ridge in northern France on 30 December 1917, during the First World War. It is held by Imperial War Museum, London.

The painting measures 79.8 × 108 centimetres (31.4 × 42.5 in). It shows British soldiers in heavy winter greatcoats scrambling up from their trenches to advance over a snow-covered landscape. Two already lie dead or wounded on the duckboards in the base of the trench and one on the snow. The others move to the right without looking back. Threatening clouds hang in the sky above, billowing darkly. Two studies held by the Imperial War museum show the carefully balanced composition.

The painting is based on Nash's experience while serving in the 28th Battalion, the London Regiment. His unit went "over the top", to push towards Marcoing near Cambrai. Of the 80 men, 68 were killed or wounded by the shell-fire during the first few minutes. Nash was one of the 12 that survived. He made the painting in early 1918, having returned to England and been recommended by his brother Paul Nash to become an official war artist. The work was commissioned by the Ministry of Information and painted in a rented seed-shed at Chalfont St Peter, Buckinghamshire.

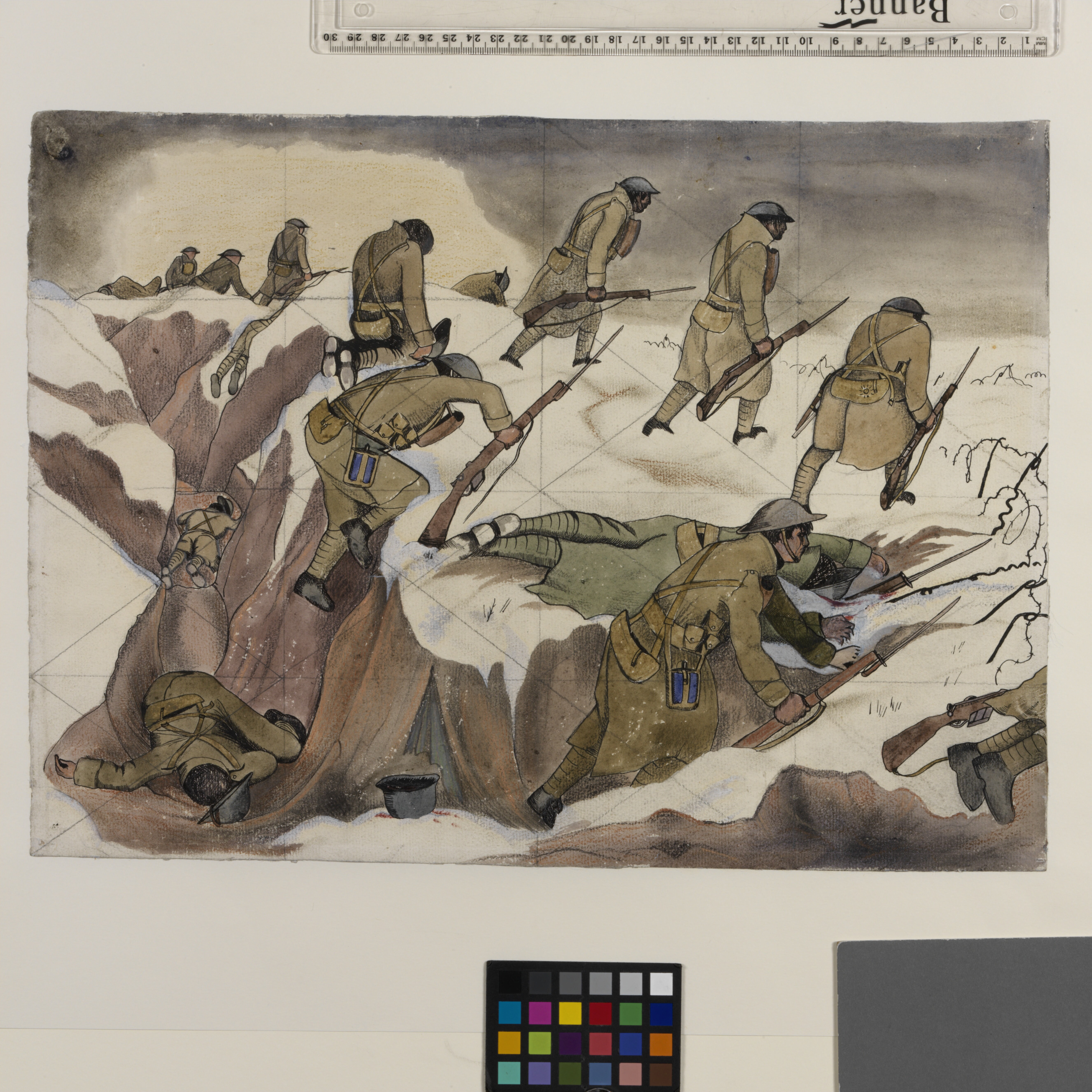
Study

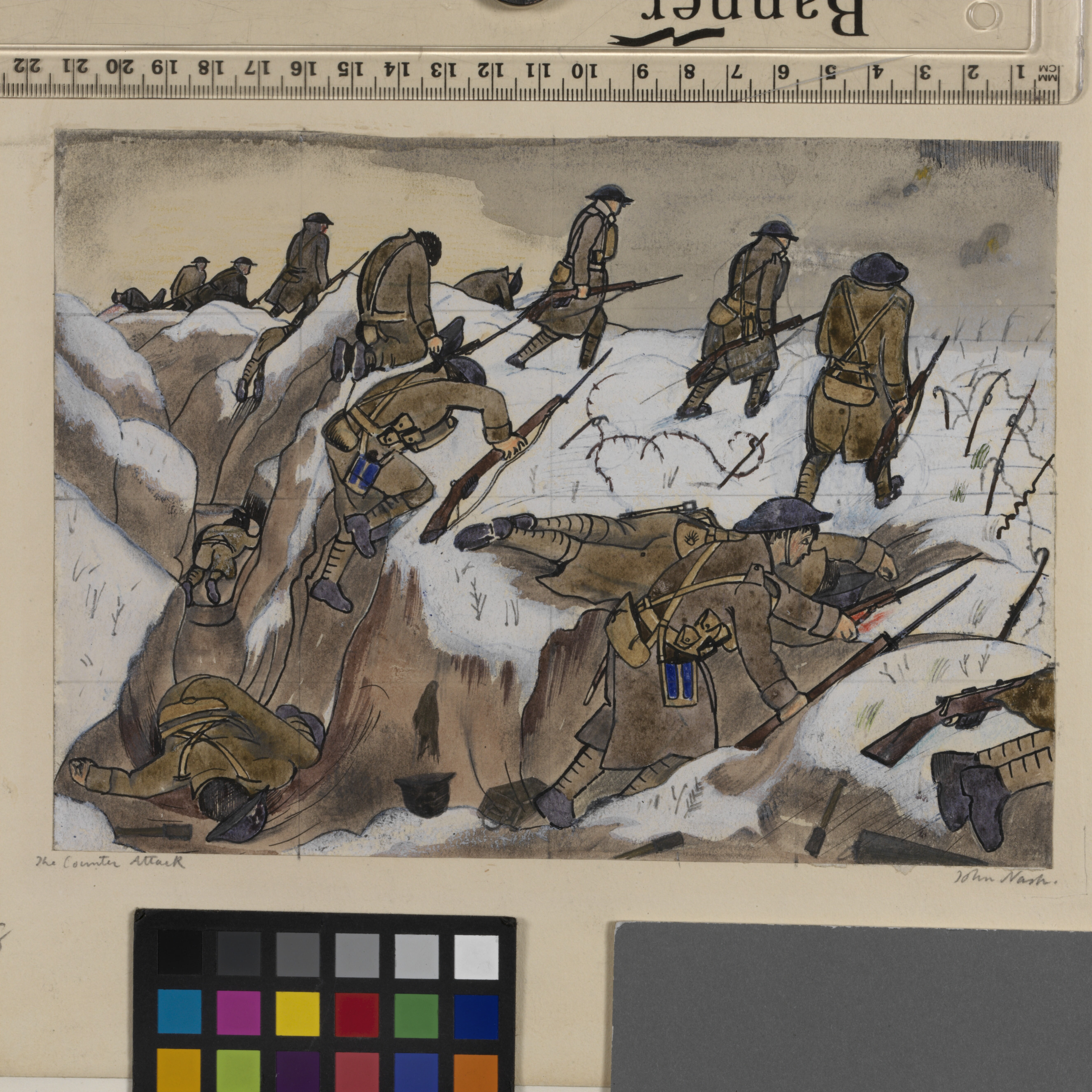
Study
