= Ida Affleck Graves =

British artist and writer (1902–1999)

Ida Florence Affleck Graves (March 1902 – 14 November 1999) was a British artist, poet, novelist, and children's writer, and member of the Bloomsbury Group.

== Early life ==
Graves was born in Mysuru, India, the daughter of Colonel Douglas H. McDonnel Graves, Surgeon, and Mabel Alice Petley. Sent to a boarding school in Eastbourne, England, at the age of six, Graves was educated from 13 at the Quaker Croham Hurst School, then in Surrey. Separated from her parents, she turned to writing for comfort, writing every day except Sundays. From Surrey, she went to the University of London to study English literature, also attending an evening course in sculpture at Chelsea College of Arts. In the early 1920s she joined the Bloomsbury Group.

== Career ==
In 1929, Leonard and Virginia Woolf's Hogarth Press published Graves's first poetry collection, The China Cupboard and Other Poems (as Ida Graves), with a cover by Vanessa Bell, as No.5 of their Living Poets series. During this period, Graves additionally supported herself as a reader for the Stage Society.

Graves and artist Blair Hughes-Stanton, who were in a relationship, started the Gemini Press. In 1933, they published their first book together: Epithalamion: a poem, a "sequence of sexual imagery and symbolism" by Graves celebrating their relationship and illustrated by Hughes-Stanton. It won the top literary award at the 1937 Venice Biennale. In 1935 they published their second volume: a book of "sardonic verse" Pastoral, or Virtue Requited. During World War II Graves worked on scenery and costumes for The Royal Ballet.

In 1956, Graves published her semi-autobiographical stream of consciousness novel Elarna Cane. Graves then entered one of the most productive periods of her life, producing not only the experimental Elarna Cane and the equally personal Willa, You're Wanted (1952), but the children's books Ostrobogulous Pigs (1952), Mouse Tash (1953), and Little Thumbamonk (1956), all published by Faber under "Affleck Graves" on their suggestion of adopting a genderless nom de plume.

In 1990, teacher Peter Wallis came across some of Graves' work in East Anglian literary magazine Rialto, and searched her out. He found that she had continued to produce poetry, but that, with some exceptions published in the Samphire New Poetry collections, most of her new work was unpublished. With encouragement from Wallis, Graves published two new collections, A Kind Husband (1994), and The Calfbearer (1999), both with Oxford University Press under "Ida Affeck Graves"; the latter collection coming out six months before her death at the age of 97. Her new poetry was well received, and in an interview with poet and author Blake Morrison, she relished her refound fame, noting "I'd love to be a cult."

== Personal life ==
Graves had two children (Anna and Anthony) with her first husband, Herbert Henry Marks; Anthony died at the age of 27 in an avalanche. Between 1930 and 1950 she was in a relationship with artist Blair Hughes-Stanton, with whom she had a son Corin (born 1933) and daughter Kristin (born 1935). In 1953, Graves began a relationship with jazz pianist Don Nevard, whom she married in 1995 and who was with her until the end of her life.

Graves was the niece of Ada J. Graves and distant cousin of poet and writer Robert Graves through Charles Graves.

She is buried in the garden of her home in Stratford St Mary, Suffolk.

== Publications ==
=== Poetry ===
Graves, I. (1929). The China cupboard and other poems. London: L & V Woolf at The Hogarth Press

Graves, I., & Stanton, B. H. (1934). Epithalamion. A poem ... With associated wood-engraving by Blair Hughes-Stanton. Gemini Press: Higham, Colchester

Graves, I. (1942). Mother and Child. A poem, etc. Fortune Press: London

Graves, I. A. (1994). A kind husband. Oxford: Oxford University Press

Graves, I. A. (1999). The Calfbearer. Oxford: Oxford University Press

=== Novels (as Affleck Graves) ===
Graves, A. (1952). Willa, you're wanted. Faber

Graves, A. (1956). Elarna Cane. London: Faber & Faber

=== Children's books (as Affleck Graves) ===
Graves, A. (1952). Ostrobogulous pigs. Faber

Graves, A. (1953). Mouse Tash ... With illustrations by Bernard Watson. London: Faber & Faber

Graves, A. (1956). Little Thumbamonk. London: publisher not identified
