= Henry and Joyce Collins =

20th-century artists in the United Kingdom

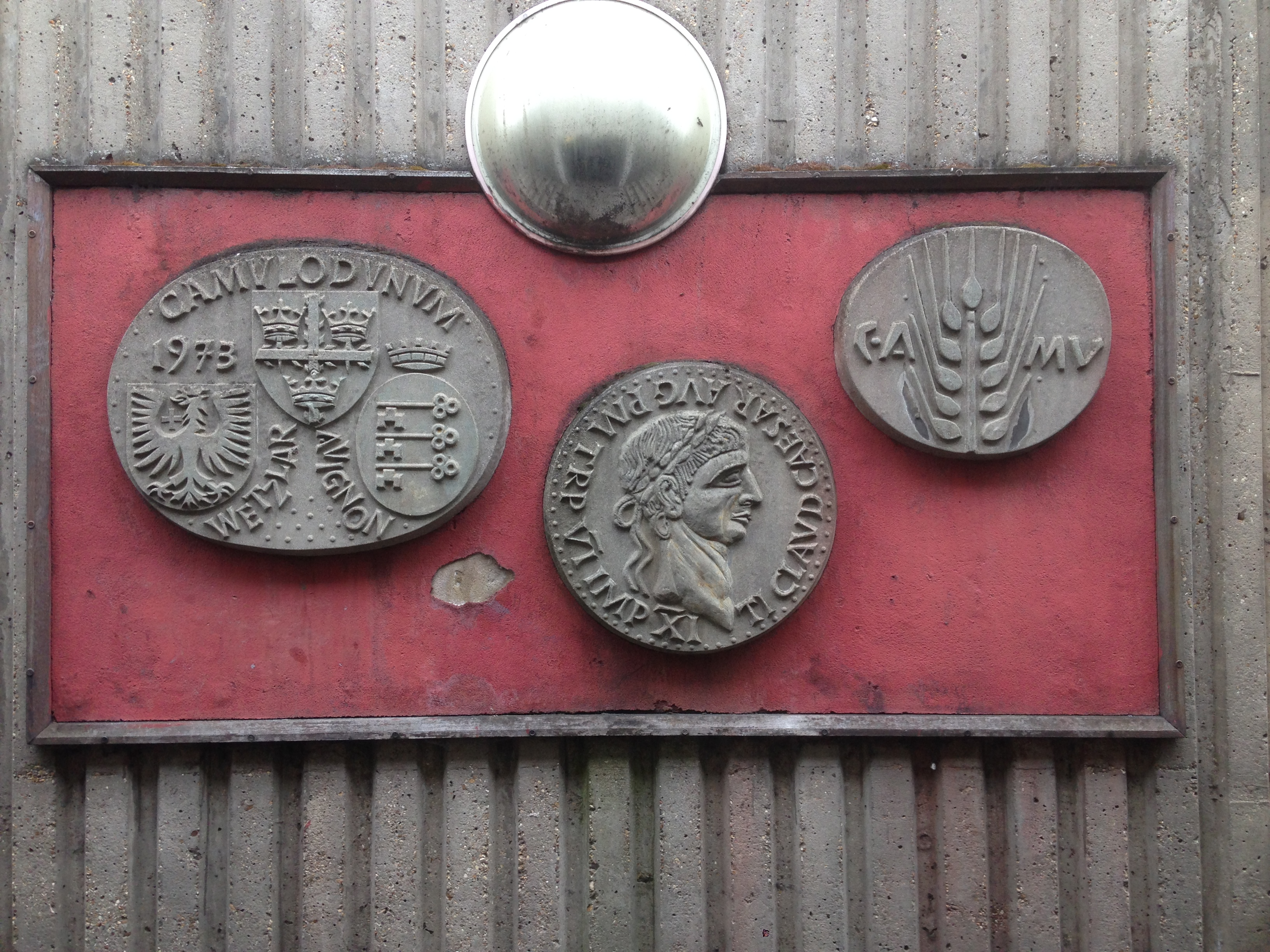
- Henry and Joyce Collins concrete mural, St Botolph's Circus underpass
- Born: September 17, 1910 Colchester, Essex (Henry Collins) and 1912 Brightlingsea, United Kingdom (Joyce Pallot)
- Died: 1994 (Henry Collins) and 2004 Lexden, United Kingdom (Joyce Pallot)

Henry William Collins and Joyce Millicent Pallot were two artists who lived and worked together for over 60 years. They are best known for their work on a number of large-scale public concrete murals during the 1960s and 1970s, many of which remain around the UK today. Their mural work often included elements relating to the cultural and industrial heritage of the location they were sited and is part of a tradition of muralists that includes William Mitchell and Kenneth Budd amongst others. Henry Collins and Joyce Pallot were both prominent members of the Colchester Art Society and exhibited together on a number of occasions.

== Henry Collins ==
Henry Collins was an artist and designer born in Colchester in 1910. He was the son of Henry Percy Collins and his wife Mary née Beagley. He studied at the Colchester School of Art and the Central School, London. During World War II he served in the Royal Artillery and the Royal Engineers. After the war, Collins worked as a freelance designer and established himself as an artist following a commission by the Central Office of Information at the Festival of Britain in 1951. Collins was also an educator teaching at St Martin's School of Art, London and the Colchester School of Art and was a founding member of the Colchester Art Society. Collins designed the Colchester Art Society's logo and designed the posters for the Colchester Arts Society's first exhibition at the Colchester Castle. Collins also designed a poster for Transport for London in 1935 titled Cheap Return Fairs. Following Henry Collins death in 1994, a memorial exhibition was held at Essex County Libraries 1995–1996.

== Joyce Pallot ==
Pallot was born in Brightlingsea in Essex, United Kingdom. She was educated at Colchester County High School and the Southend Schools of Art. Following World War II, Pallot taught part-time in private schools and adult education centres in Colchester as well as in the Colchester School of Art. In her lifetime Pallot was a member of the Society of Industrial Artists and a prominent member of the Colchester Art Society sitting on various selection committees alongside fellow Colchester Art Society member and director, the artist John Nash. Some of Pallot's paintings are included in the Colchester County High School's collection as well as Colchester Art Society's permanent collection.

Joyce Pallot died at the Old Rectory Residential Home, Lexden in May 2004.

== Henry Collins and Joyce Pallot ==
Joyce Pallot met fellow artist and designer Henry Collins at the Colchester Art School in 1932 and the couple subsequently married in 1938 . They worked together on a series of commissions from 1948 and completed over 60 projects in the UK. In 1951 the couple were commissioned by the Central Office of Information to create a mural for the Sea and Ships Pavilion for the Festival of Britain; Expo '70 in Osaka, Japan; Jamestown Festival, United States; Shell Centre; GPO Tower, London; Grosvenor House, London; Ind Coope Ltd; Philips Business Systems; Sainsbury's; British Home Stores; Cwmbran Arts Trust; Essex County Council; and IBM, London. Collins and Pallot exhibited together on a number of occasions including a joint retrospective exhibition at The Minories, Colchester in 1984. The artists also collaborated on a number of public concrete murals which they signed collectively as 'Henry and Joyce Collins'.

== Concrete Murals by Henry and Joyce Collins ==
Well known works by Henry and Joyce Collins include a series of concrete murals they completed together. These murals can be seen in their hometown of Colchester, Essex in the St Botolph's Circus underpass; the Crouch Street underpass; and on the façade of the Sainsbury's supermarket in Priory Walk. In April 2012, Firstsite funded a project to restore and relocate a series of three reliefs to 15 Queen Street, Colchester. These works by Henry and Joyce Collins were completed for the façade of the British Home Stores, Colchester in 1976 and were previously installed in the Lion Walk Shopping Centre until its redevelopment in 2009. Other concrete murals by Henry and Joyce Collins can be seen in other locations in the UK including a mural in Hamtun Street, Southampton which narrates the history of the city; the Stockport British Home Stores also depicting the history of the city; Newcastle Through the Ages (1974) located on the Primark in Newcastle; and Sainsbury's supermarket, Burkhurst Place, Bexhill-on-sea, the latter restored in 2024. These works are an example of Post-war mural art that was popularised following the Festival of Britain in 1951.

The early process Pallot and Collins used to make these concrete murals included the use of plastic moulds. The relief was made in reverse and then poured concrete was put into the moulds. The moulds themselves would then be broken in order to remove the concrete mural. Later the couple would go on to use wooden moulds with a releasing agent which meant that moulds could be re-used. Pallot and Collins would often extensively research the history of an area before starting a mural and would often allude to the city's history in the mural itself including references to important local figures and events.

Another installation is on the wall of Sainsbury's store on Victoria Road, Surbiton, Southwest London. The two panels depict the history of Surbiton. The mosaic uses square glazed tiles pressed into wet concrete. It also shows the railway history of the town.

According to the Twentieth Century Society, as many as one thousand murals were made between the end of the Second World War and the 1980s in the UK and were a product of the post war building boom. The Twentieth Century Society has launched a campaign to preserve some of these murals, as some have been destroyed in the redevelopment of cities in UK such as the 2008 destruction of a mural by Ray Howard-Jones in Cardiff and another by Mitzi Cunliffe in Sunderland.

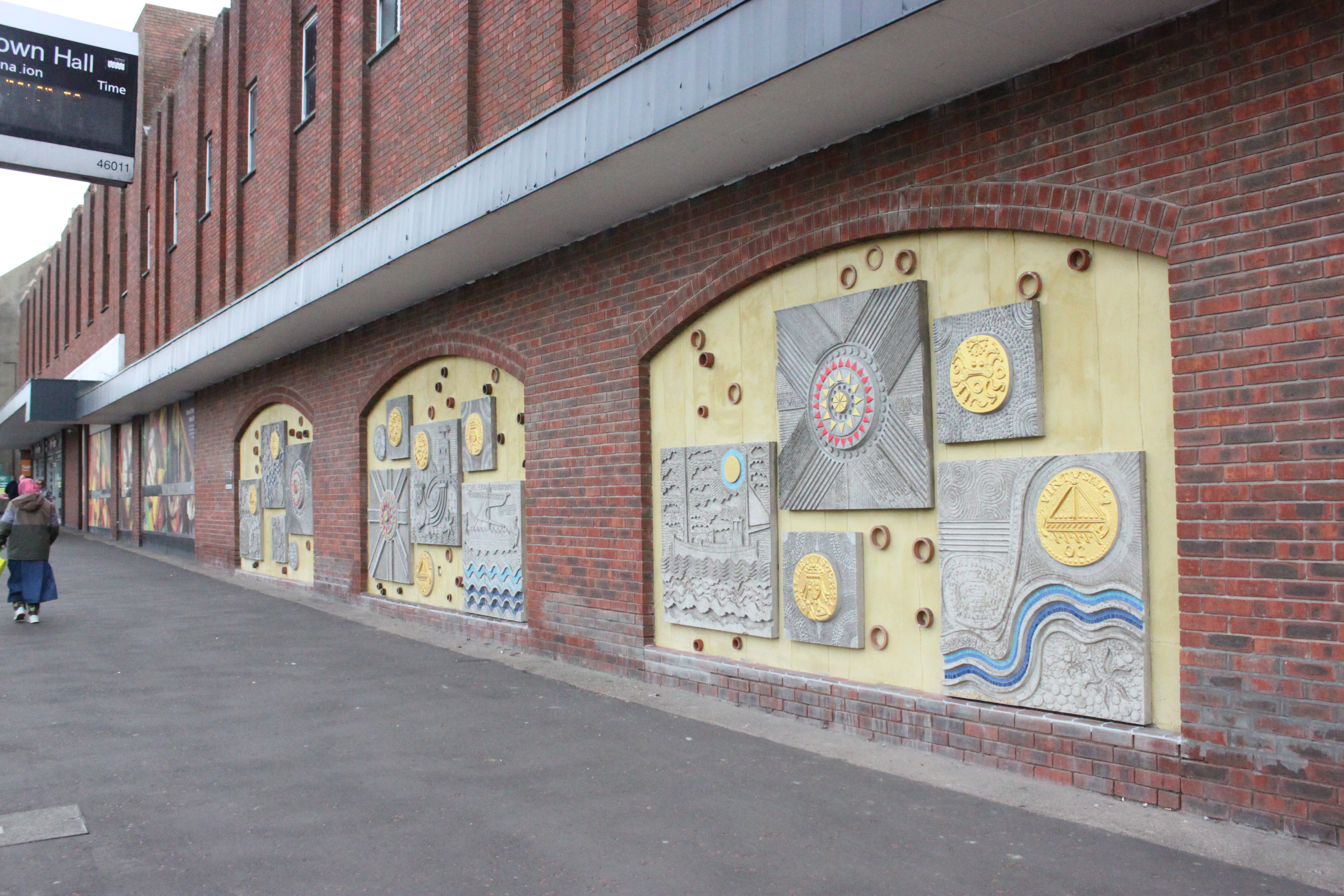
Restored mural on wall of Sainsbury's super market Town Hall Square, Bexhill

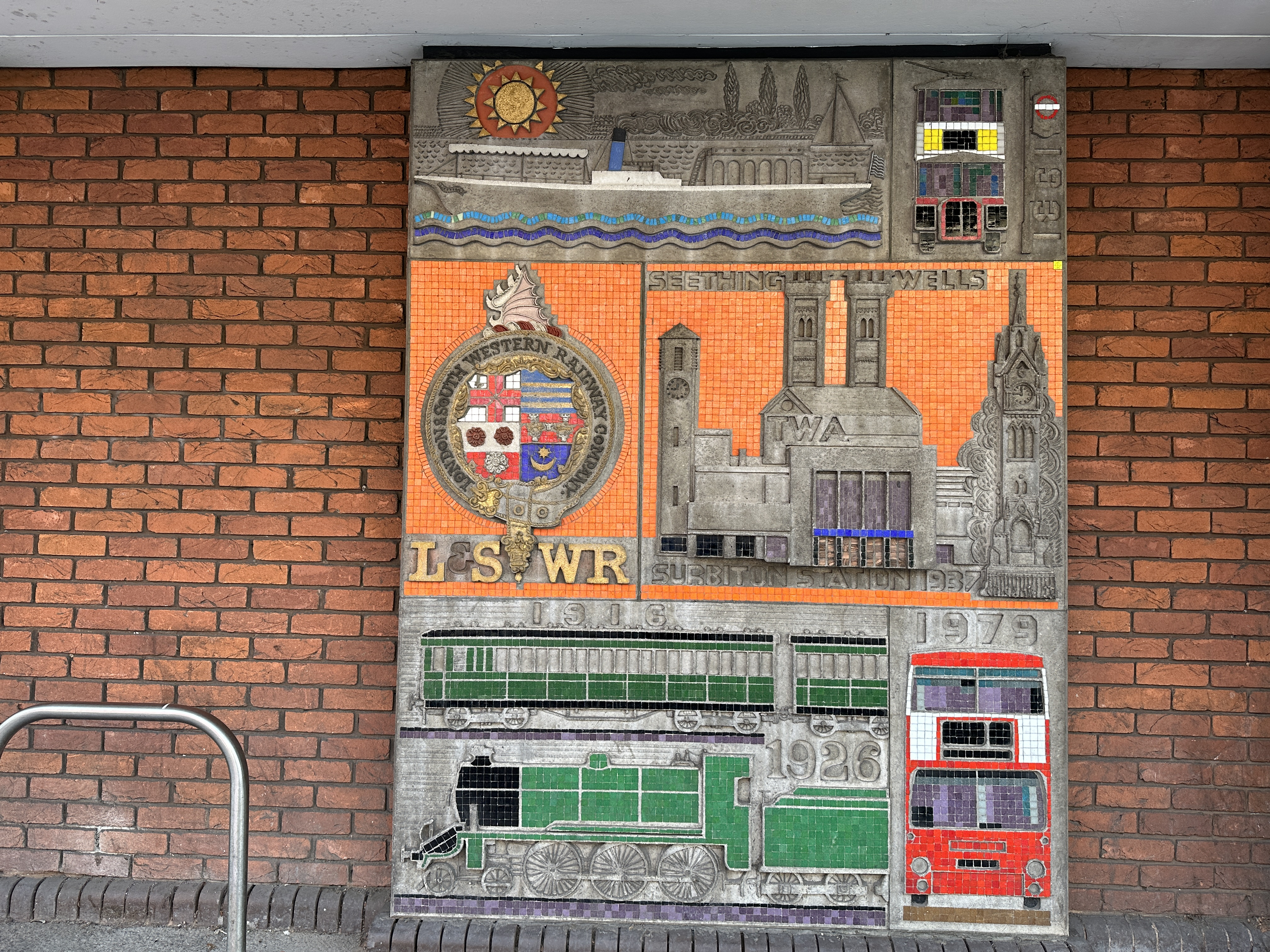
Sainsbury's mosaic depicting the history of Surbiton and its transport.

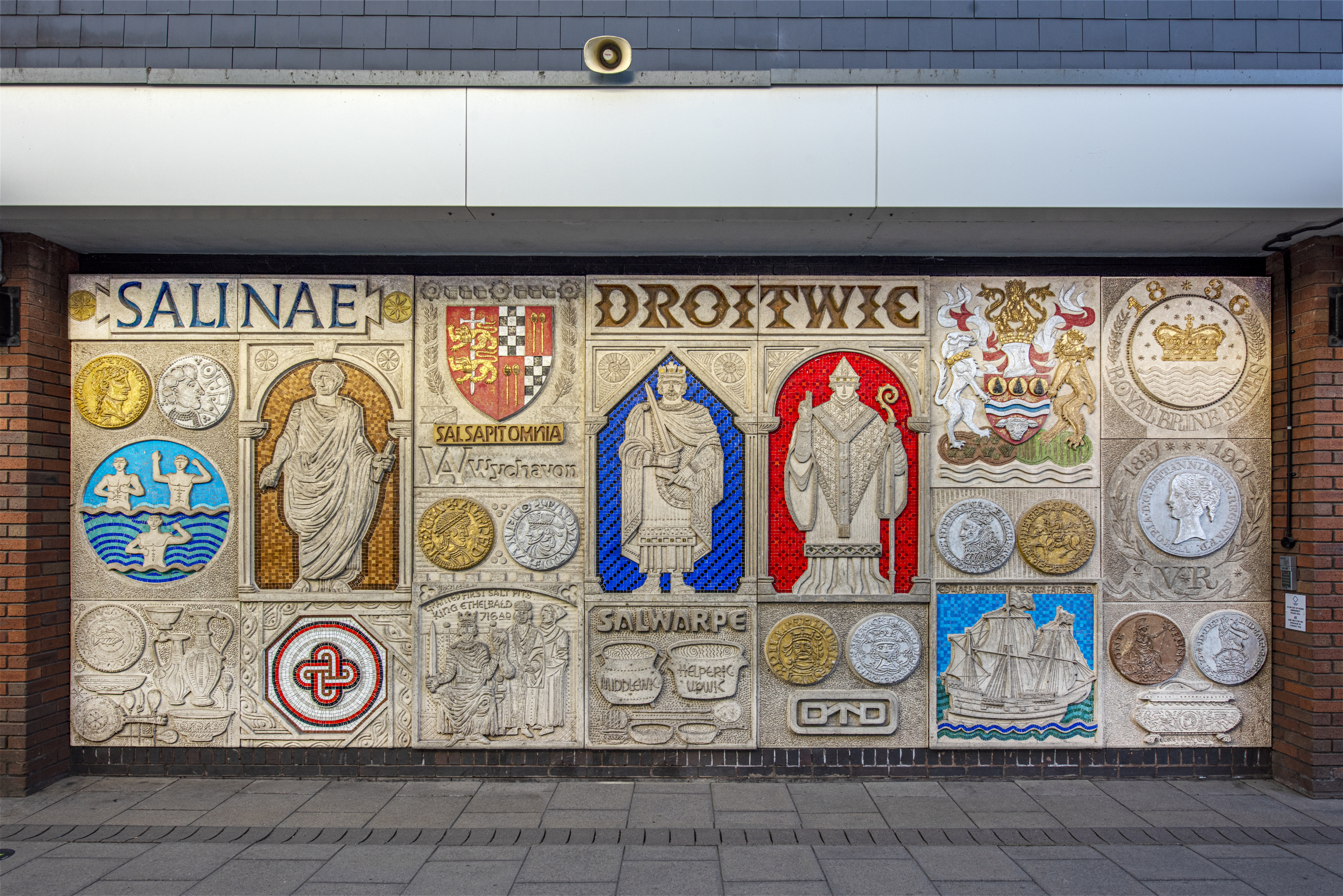
Significant events in the history of Droitwich.

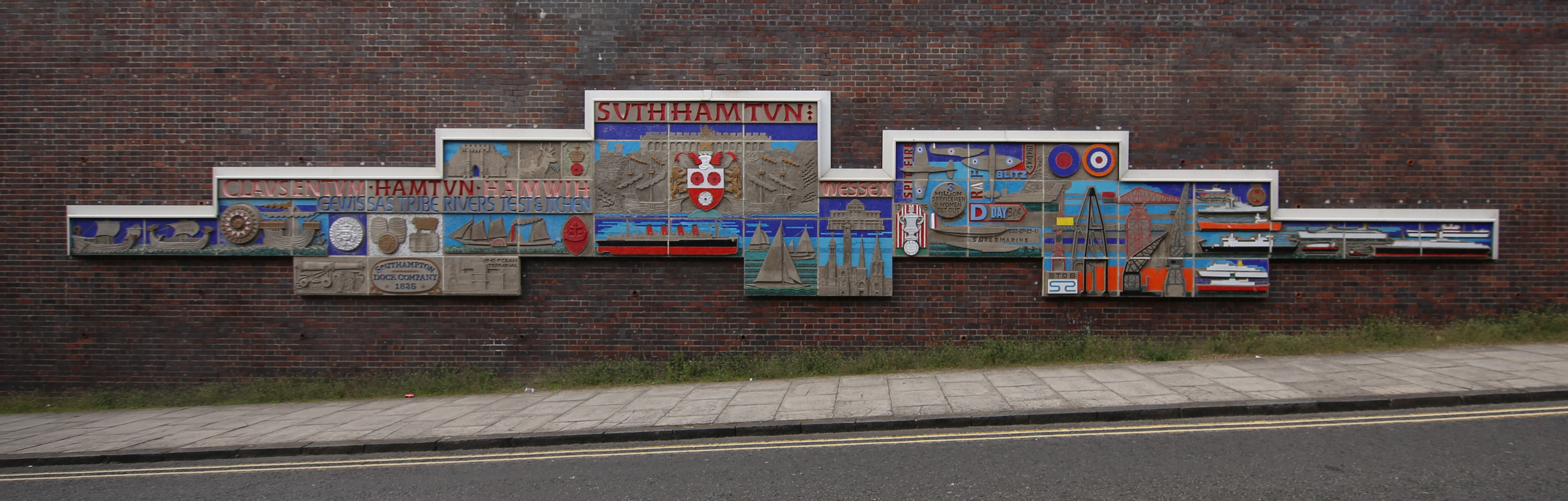
The Hamtun Street Mural inspired from the history of Southampton.

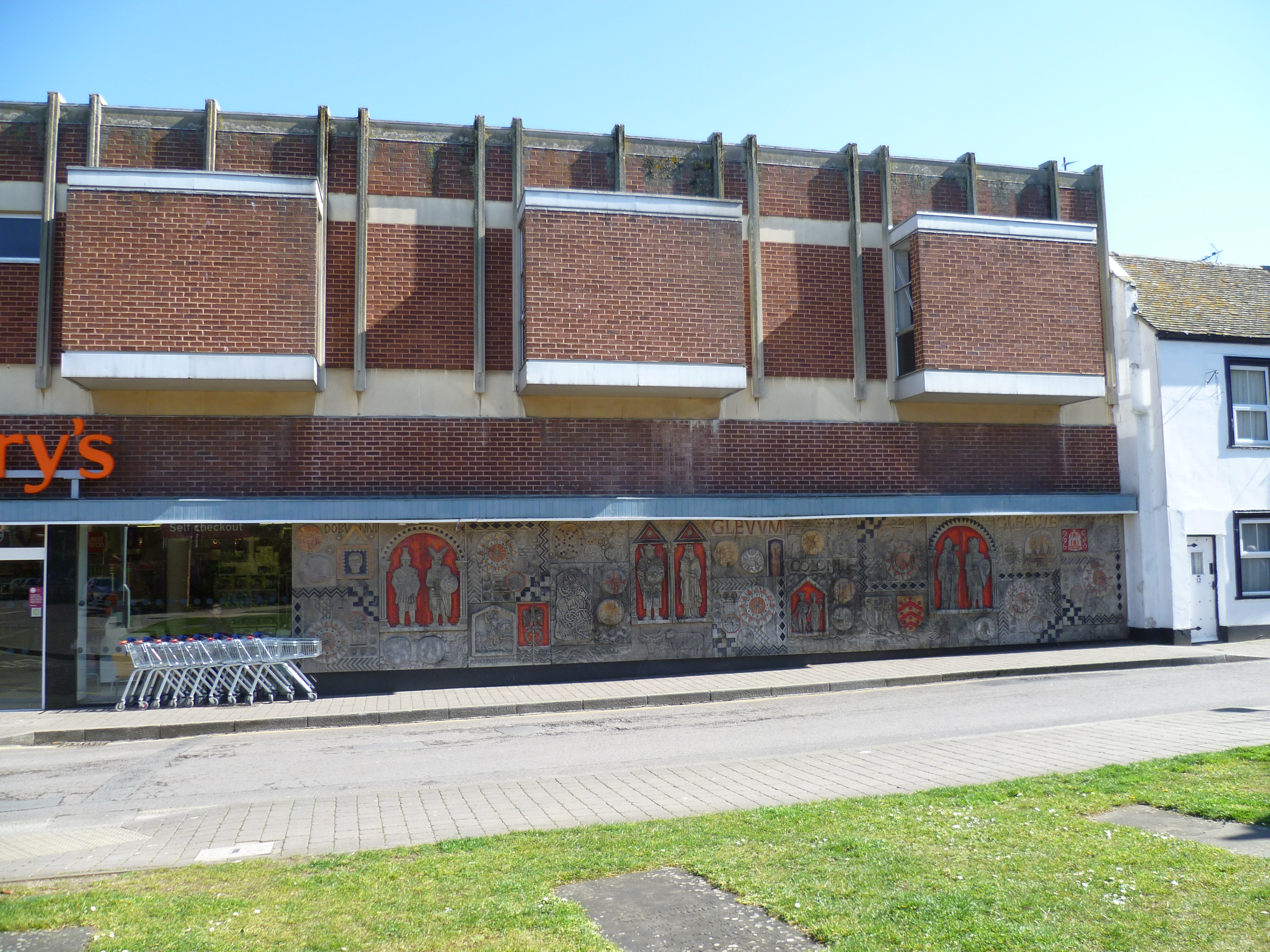
Roman-themed mural in Gloucester.
