= Blair Hughes-Stanton =

English artist (1902–1981)

- Captain Blair Hughes-Stanton in 1942 or 1943
- Born: Blair Rowlands Hughes-Stanton; 22 February 1902; Kensington, London, England
- Died: 6 June 1981 (aged 79)
- Known for: Wood-engraving
- Spouse: Gertrude Hermes
- Father: Herbert Hughes-Stanton

Blair Rowlands Hughes-Stanton (22 February 1902 – 6 June 1981) was a major figure in the English wood-engraving revival in the twentieth century. He was the son of the artist Sir Herbert Hughes-Stanton. He exhibited with the Society of Wood Engravers, but was more in sympathy with the philosophy of the English Wood Engraving Society, of which he was a founding member in 1925. He co-directed the Gregynog Press from 1930 to 1933 with his wife, Gertrude Hermes.

== The early years ==
At the age of 13 Hughes-Stanton, unable to face the prospect of home life with his three sisters, joined the Royal Navy training ship HMS Conway. At the age of 19 he switched direction completely after a conversation with his father, the Royal Academician Sir Herbert Hughes-Stanton, and joined the Byam Shaw School of Art. There he came under the influence of Leon Underwood and, in 1921, he moved to Underwood's Brook Green School. In 1922 he joined the Royal Academy Schools, but Underwood remained the dominant influence on him. At Brook Green the American wood engraver Marion Mitchell introduced him to wood-engraving, which set the direction of his life. Underwood and he were kindred spirits, to such an extent that, in 1925, Underwood left Hughes-Stanton in charge of the Brook Green School when he went to America.

Hughes-Stanton met Eric Kennington, who introduced him to T. E. Lawrence. Hughes-Stanton was commissioned to engrave ten tail-pieces for the monumental limited edition of Seven Pillars of Wisdom (1926). Some extra-special copies had a full-page engraving by Hughes-Stanton for the dedicatory poem to "S.A.".

Other commissions followed and, in the next few years, he illustrated with wood engravings three tall folios for the Cresset Press – The Pilgrim's Progress (1928), The Apocrypha (1929) and D. H. Lawrence's Birds, Beasts and Flowers (1930).

In 1925 he fell in love with Gertrude Hermes, a fellow student at Brook Green and another member of the Underwood inner circle. In 1926 he sold his copy of Seven Pillars of Wisdom for £100 and married her. They had two children, Judith (born 1927) and Simon (born 1928).

== The Gregynog Press and Gertrude Hermes ==
In 1930 Hughes-Stanton and Hermes, along with William McCance and Agnes Miller Parker, were appointed in various capacities to the artistic and business management of the Gregynog Press. Hughes-Stanton produced his characteristic wood engravings for Comus by John Milton in 1931, Erewhon by Samuel Butler in 1932 and The Revelation of Saint John the Divine, Four Poems by Milton and The Lamentations of Jeremiah, all of which appeared in 1933.

Relations were strained in a number of areas. Some of the board at Gregynog felt that Hughes-Stanton's wood engravings were too erotic, and his personal conduct was upsetting Margaret and Gwendoline Davies, who owned the press. In 1930 Hughes-Stanton had started an affair with Ida Affleck Graves, who offered him "Lawrentian sex". In March 1932 Hermes left Hughes-Stanton and moved back to London, where she stayed with Leon Underwood. Hughes-Stanton left the press in September 1933.

== The Gemini Press and Ida Graves ==
When Hughes-Stanton left the Gregynog Press he returned to London with Ida Affleck Graves. Hermes had divorced him, and Graves's husband, Herbert Marks, had left her for Isobel Powys, removing their two children. Marks would not contemplate divorce, however, because of his social position, and gave Graves a weekly allowance of £4 a week provided that she took the blame for the separation. Hughes-Stanton and Graves had two children – Corin (born 1933) and Kristin (born 1935).

The couple moved to Stratford St. Mary, near Colchester, and founded the Gemini Press. Hughes-Stanton wrote in his first prospectus, "I have founded the Gemini Press to be able, when occasion arises and unhampered by any outside prejudices, to make books in which there is a real fusion between contemporary writer and artist." In 1934 the press produced Epithalamion by Ida Graves, with 23 full-page wood engravings by Hughes-Stanton. The book is a celebration of their physical and spiritual wedding, even though they were unable to marry. Only half the edition was sold at the time of publication, partly because of the depression, but also a lack of business competence. In 1970 Hughes-Stanton offered the remaining 25 sets of Japan Vellum sheets and 125 sets of Basingwerk sheets to the Basilisk Press. In 1935 the press produced its second and final illustrated book, Pastoral, or Virtue Requited by H.H.M. (Herbert Marks). They needed the money, but it must have been galling for the couple.

This period was a time of financial hardship for the couple, and commissions dried up completely at times. They moved to a late mediaeval timber house in Stratford Saint Mary, which they spent years restoring. By 1939 their relationship was almost at an end.

Hughes-Stanton produced a number of books, more or less significant, during this period. They include The Ship of Death by D. H. Lawrence (1933), Primeval Gods by Christopher Sandford (1934), Ecclesiastes and A Crime against Cania, both for the Golden Cockerel Press and both 1934, and Address by Abraham Lincoln at the Dedication of the National Cemetery at Gettysburg (1936), an unillustrated book printed by Hughes-Stanton at the Gemini Press in an edition of 50 copies, not for sale, the final publication of the press. In 1938, Hughes-Stanton won the International Prize for Engraving at the Venice Biennale.

== The Second World War ==
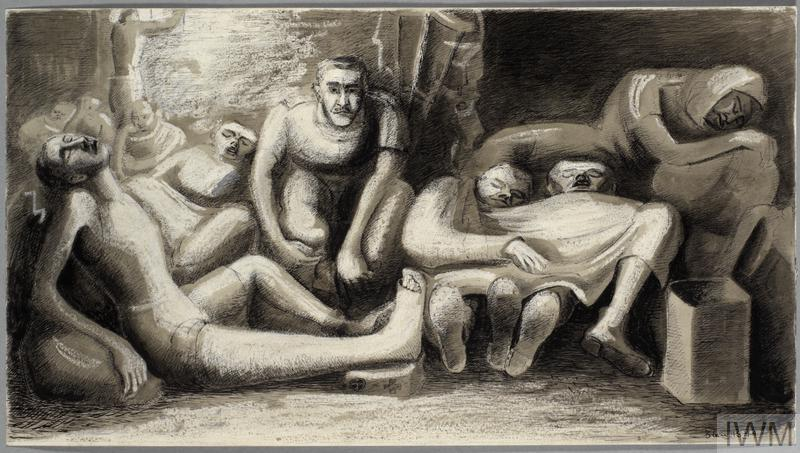
A cattle-truck Journey from Salonika to Germany, 1941 (1944) (Art.IWM ART LD 3838)

At the start of the Second World War, Hughes-Stanton, like many other artists, undertook camouflage work before he enlisted in the British Army. In 1940 he joined the Royal Engineers. He served in the Middle East and then transferred to Greece, where he was captured. An overzealous prison guard in the temporary POW camp at Corinth shot him in the throat and skull when he strayed too close to the camp wire. His injury incapacitated him and he was moved to a series of camps in Germany, and he was finally repatriated to Britain in August 1943. Back in England he wrote to the War Artists' Advisory Committee (WAAC) in November 1943, seeking a painting commission. After a meeting with Kenneth Clark, the chairman of WAAC, he was given a commission to paint three pictures based on his experiences as a POW. After Blair-Stanton completed these, WAAC purchased two more pictures from him.

== The later years and Anne Ross ==
Hughes-Stanton had already started teaching at the Westminster School of Art before the war, and he now became more and more reliant on teaching – at Colchester School of Art, Saint Martin's School of Art and the Central School of Art and Design. Even in his 70s he was teaching at Winchester School of Art. He had very few commissions during this period, and the engravings for his best-known book from this period – The Confessions of an English Opium Eater by Thomas de Quincey (Folio Society, 1948 and 1963) – were engraved in the early 1930s for the Fanfrolico Press. In 1955 he began to work with Lewis and Dorothey Allen of the Allen Press in California, and produced five books for them, mostly illustrated with linocuts.

Hughes-Stanton left Graves in 1950 and took refuge with Gertrude Hermes. In 1952 he married Anne Ross, a former student, with whom he had two daughters: Penelope (born 1954) and Chloë (born 1955).

He died in 1981, and his ashes were scattered on the River Stour, Suffolk, by his two friends from the local pub, Peter and Joe.

There was an exhibition of his work at the Studio One Gallery in Oxford in 1982, and a memorial exhibition at the Minories Gallery, Colchester, in 1984.

== His life and work ==
Although he did some work in oils and spent a great deal of time experimenting with linocuts in his later years, Hughes-Stanton's artistic production consists mostly of wood engravings. He is known for the very fine white lines of his engravings, which presented considerable difficulty to pressmen trying to print his engravings on hard handmade paper. The engravings are frequently of the female form, and contemporary judgements ranged from erotic to pornographic. Towards the end of his career his engravings featured semi-abstract figures. Examples of his fine cutting and individual style can be seen at the British Council website.

Clare Leighton wrote of him: "Of the same school is Blair Hughes Stanton (sic), equally brilliant, if not superior, in craftsmanship. ... (he) is paying the price of his brilliance by having many imitators."

Works illustrated include –

- T. E. Lawrence – Seven Pillars of Wisdom (Private, 1926),
- Walter De La Mare – Alone (Faber & Gwyer, 1927),
- Walter De La Mare – Self To Self (Faber & Gwyer, 1928),
- John Bunyan – Pilgrim's Progress, 2 vols (Cresset Press, 1928),
- Verona Pilcher – The Searcher: A War Play (Heinemann, 1929),
- The Apocrypha (Cresset, 1929),
- D. H. Lawrence – Birds, Beasts and Flowers (Cresset, 1930),
- Simon Gantillon – Maya (Golden Cockerel, 1930),
- W. H. Davies – The Lover's Song Book (Gregynog Press, 1931),
- John Milton – Comus: A Mask (Gregynog Press, 1931),
- W. J. Gruffydd – Caniadu (Gregynog, 1932),
- Christopher Marlowe – The Tragicall History of Doctor Faustus (Golden Hours, 1932),
- Samuel Butler – Erewhon (Gregynog Press, 1933),
- The Revelation of Saint John The Divine (Gregynog Press, 1933),
- Arthur Calder-Marshall – About Levy (Cape, 1933),
- John Milton – Four Poems (Gregynog Press, 1933),
- D. H. Lawrence – The Ship of Death and Other Poems (Martin Secker, 1933),
- T. O'B Hubbard – To-morrow Is A New Day: A Fantasy (Lincoln Williams, 1934),
- John Mavrogordato – Elegies and Songs (Cobden-Sanderson, 1934),
- Christopher Sandford – Primeval Gods (Boar's Head Press, 1934),
- The Lamentations of Jeremiah (Gregynog Press, 1934),
- Ecclesiastes, or The Preacher (Golden Cockerel Press, 1934),
- Arthur Calder-Marshall – A Crime Against Cania (Golden Cockerel Press, 1934),
- John Collier – The Devil and All: Six Short Stories (Nonesuch Press, 1934),
- Ida Graves – Epithalamion: A Poem (Gemini Press, 1935),
- Eric Newton – An Approach To Art [12 Broadcast Talks…] (BBC, 1935),
- Herbert H. Marks – Pastoral, or Virtue Requited (Gemini Press, 1935),
- Ambrose Heath & D. D. Cottington Taylor – The National Calendar of Cooking (The Ministry of Agriculture & Fisheries, 1936),
- Ellis Wynne – Gweledigaetheu y Bardo Cwsc [Visions of The Sleeping Bard] (Gregynog Press, 1940),
- Ida Graves – Mother and Child: A Poem (Fortune Press, 1942),
- A. J. Wise & Reginald A. Smith – Voices on the Green (Michael Joseph, 1945),
- Yoti Lane – African Folk Tales (Peter Lunn, 1946),
- Thomas De Quincey – The Confessions of an English Opium-Eater (Folio Society, 1948),
- Jane Austen – Sense and Sensibility (Avalon Press, 1949),
- Anthony Trollope – The Eustace Diamonds, 2 vols (Oxford University Press, 1950),
- Hugh Anderson – A Zoo in Your House: A Selection of Animal Stories (Dennis Yates, 1951),
- Charles Dickens & Wilkie Collins – The Wreck of The Golden Mary: A Saga of The California Gold Rush (Allen Press, 1956),
- Joseph Conrad – Youth (Allen Press, 1959),
- John Mason – More Papers Hand Made (John Mason, 1966),
- Arthur Calder Marshall – The Scarlet Boy (Rupert Hart-Davis, 1961) [Dust Jacket],
- Henry James – The Beast in The Jungle: A Psychological Novel (Allen Press, 1963),
- The Book of Genesis (Allen Press, 1970),
- Joseph Conrad, Gustave Flaubert, Henry James, Luigi Pirandello – Four Fictions (Allen Press, 1973)
