= Bensoussan =

Bensoussan is a Maghrebi Jewish surname, variant form of Ben Soussan, Bensussan, Bensusan and Ibn Shushan. It is derived from the Hebrew shôshannah "lily". Notable people with the surname include:

- Babette Bensoussan, Australian author and competitive intelligence specialist
- David Bensoussan, engineering professor, Montreal Jewish communal leader, historian of the Jews of Morocco
- David Bensusan-Butt (1914–1994), English economist
- Eddy Bensoussan, Brazilian physician
- Michel Bensoussan (born 1954), French football player
- Moses Bensusan (born 1968), Canadian-American real estate developer
- Pierre Bensusan (born 1957), French-Algerian guitarist
- Pierre-Luc Ben Soussan, founder of musical group Naguila
- Rene Ben Sussan (born 1895), French illustrator
- Ruth Bensusan-Butt (1877–1957), first female medical doctor in Colchester
- Samuel L. Bensusan (1872–1958), English author

Other uses

- Bensoussan or Bensousan Han, were built since 1810
