= The Minories, Colchester =

Building and gardens in Essex, England

The Minories
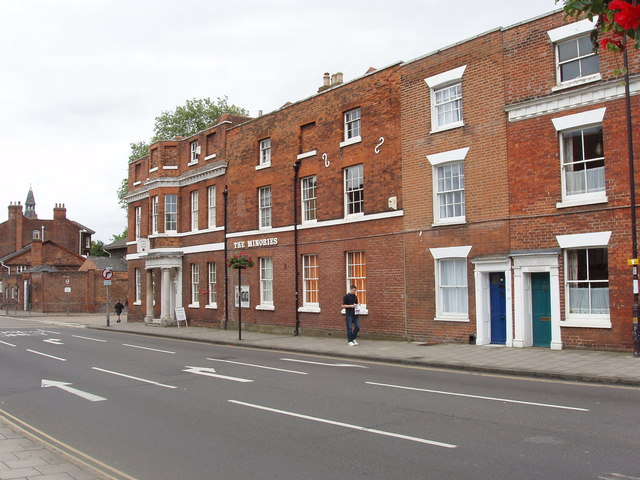
- Front view from Colchester High Street

- Location within Essex
- Established: 1956
- Location: Colchester, Essex, England
- Coordinates: 51.889°N 0.906°E
- Website: www.wearetheminories.org

The Minories is a Grade II listed building and gardens situated at the east end of High Street in Colchester, Essex, England, near Hollytrees, Gate House and Colchester Castle. It currently houses The Minories Galleries.

== Early history ==
The house is believed to have been built in the Tudor period. In 1731 it was purchased by the baize manufacturer Isaac Boggis for £420. His son, Thomas Boggis, inherited the house, and employed an architect, probably John Alefounder (1732–1787) to remodel the building, turning parts of it into an elegant Georgian residence. The Boggis family lived in the house for almost 200 years. From 1821 to 1915 the building had several owners and tenants, one of whom was Dr. Becker, a general practitioner (GP) whose son, Harry Becker, lived there for a time while he learned his trade as a landscape painter and went on to become one of East Anglia's best known artists.

In 1915 Geoffrey Crawford Bensusan-Butt and his wife Dr. Ruth Crawford took over the lease, purchasing the property along with a portion of land that included the Gothic Folly, a summer house built in 1830. Crawford later had three exhibitions of his artwork shown at the Minories in 1962, 1964 and 1975. Dr. Ruth Crawford was the sister-in-law of the painter Lucien Pissarro, and was one of the first female GPs in Colchester. She used the front rooms of The Minories as her consulting rooms, and also opened Colchester's first infant nursery there. One of the Bensusan-Butt's three children was the English economist, David Bensusan-Butt.

== The Victor Batte-Lay Trust ==
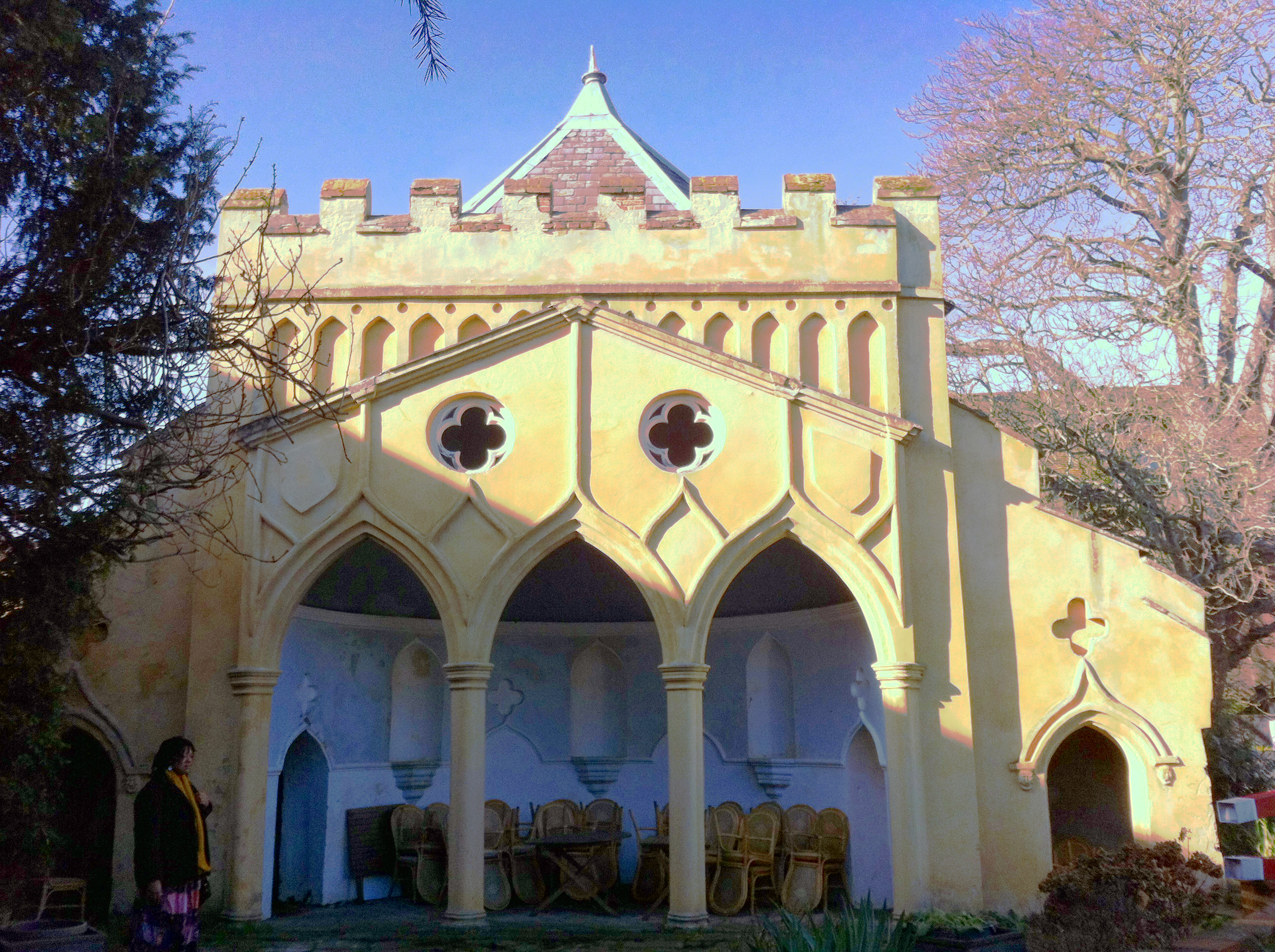
The Gothic Folly in the Minories' garden

In 1956 Dr. Ruth, who had survived her husband, sold The Minories along with the garden to the Victor Batte-Lay Trust, named after the art collector who had been a hereditary freeman of the town. The trust was set up by Batte-Lay's window, Margaret, to purchase and endow a building in Colchester as a memorial to her husband. From 1963 to 1974 R. A. Bevan was chair of the Victor Batte-Lay Trust. The Minories was sold on the strict condition that it would continue to be used for artistic purposes.

The Victor Batte-Lay Trust has provided a public cultural and artistic centre for Colchester and North-East Essex. No. 73, the house next door to The Minories, was purchased and added in 1975 with funding from Eastern Arts and the support of local professionals. The Minories, run by the Trust as The Minories Art Gallery, presented work by Edward Bawden, Leon Underwood, Eric Ravilious, Frederick Hans Haagensen, Harry Becker, John Bratby, John and Paul Nash, Lucien Pissarro, Cedric Morris, Christopher Wood, Bill Brandt, Maggi Hambling, Jacob Epstein and Mark Wallinger.

By the early 1990s the Trust's resources were significantly reduced, and the gallery closed in 1992, leading to a period of uncertainty. It reopened in 1994 when Firstsite took on the lease and continued to pay some of the Trust's obligations.

== The Victor Batte-Lay Trust Collection ==
Upon her death in 1955, Margaret Batte-Lay bequeathed her husband's collection of art objects to "the people of Colchester … in particular those who shall take an interest in the artistic and antiquarian features of that town". The initial collection held works mainly by British artists, including still lives from the 17th century, regency portraiture, 18th century prints and drawings and 19th century oil paintings and samplers. This collection was first displayed on the ground floor of The Minories Gallery in an imitation of the original domestic setting together with new acquisitions which included antique clocks and chandeliers that highlighted Batte-Lay's discerning taste in art and antiques.

By the end of the decade, the Trustees had acquired new works through purchases, loans and gifts with the intention to expand the Permanent Collection. By the 1960s, as the collection grew via purchases and the occasional gift, it also took on a more modern direction in order to attract new and younger audiences. Works acquired during this period varied in style but the strength of the collection lay in its possession of prints by several British modernists most notably, John Nash, Paul Nash and Blair Hughes-Stanton as well as 14 figure drawings by Camille Pissarro.

The acquisition and subsequent sale of Robert Bevan’s The Cab Yard in the 1970s paved the way for the purchase of the adjacent property as a new exhibiting space, which became known as The Girling Room. As a result, the Contemporary Art Society gifted generously to the collection with works such as Margaret Mellis' Lilac Yellow and Ian McKeever's Sand and Sea Series No. 8. The Victor Batte-Lay Trust then developed a policy of acquiring work by 20th century artists preferably with strong regional links.

In the early 1980s, the team at The Minories was the recipient of a sizeable amount of funding from charitable organisations and Friends of The Minories which led to the setting up of an official purchasing policy. The collection expanded again through new purchases, most significantly the team established a sculpture collection. During this period, there was also a Permanent Collection room that exhibited a selection of works on rotation. By the mid-1980s the collection faced a sudden change in funding circumstances. In order to stay afloat, several works were sold off and those acquired by Colchester Borough Council stayed in the local area.

At present, the Victor Batte Lay collection consists of 135 acquisitions by renowned British and international artists. They are not on permanent display but a selection of the Victor Batte-Lay art collection can be viewed in temporary exhibitions at Colchester's Firstsite and on loan in regional and national institutions. Images of the works are available online.

== Current use ==
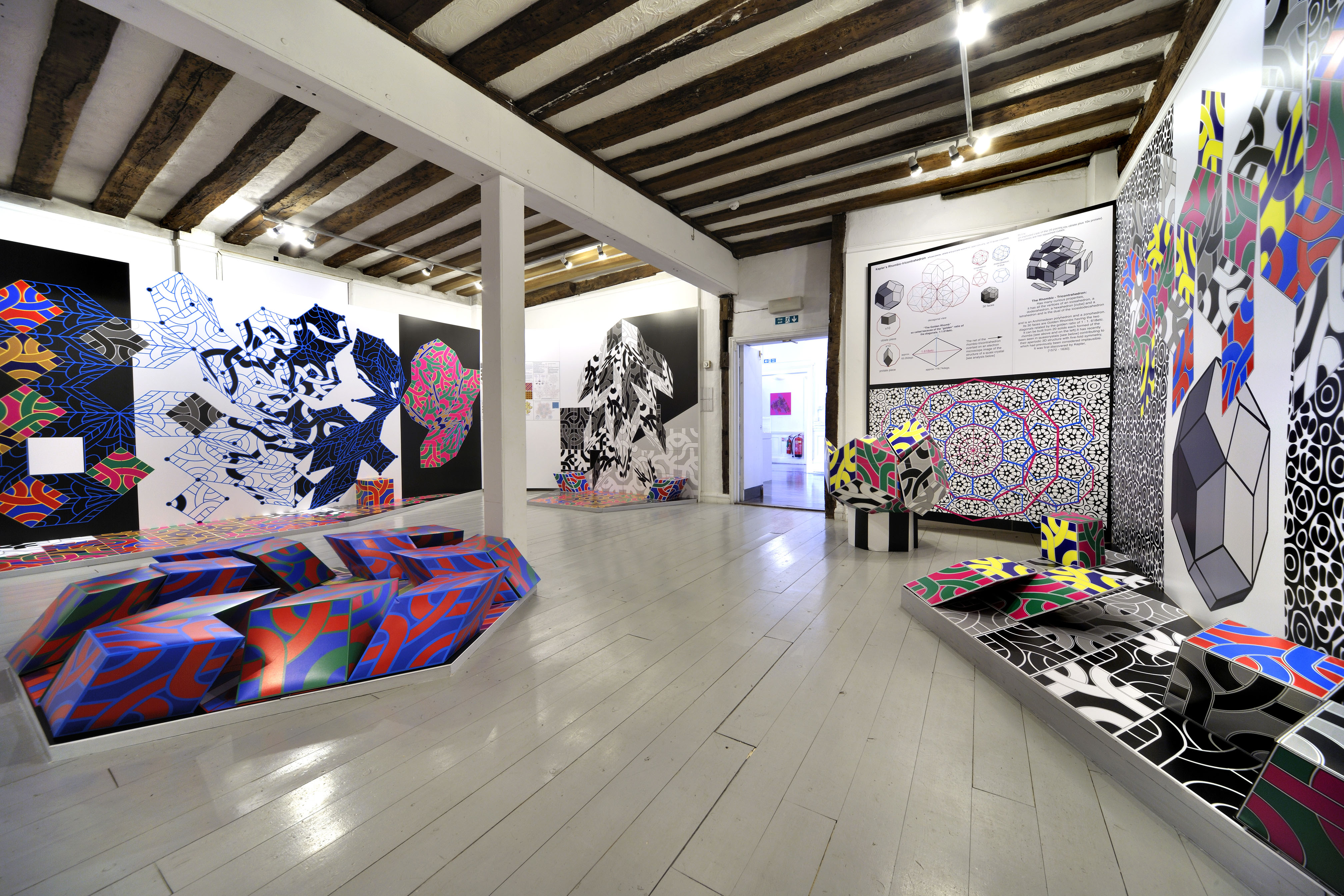
Installation view of Keith Albarn's exhibition, Pattern and Belief at The Minories Galleries

In early 2008 Firstsite left The Minories and moved into Crouch Street while their new building was developed, and in June 2008 Colchester Institute took on the lease for the Minories. The site then became home to The Minories Galleries, a contemporary art gallery run by Colchester School of Art which is open to the public and houses the Colchester School of Art's Postgraduate programmes and a café surrounded by a walled garden. The Minories is next door to Firstsite, Colchester's contemporary art space, in the centre of St Botolph's Quarter.

Since being run by Colchester School of Art and Colchester Institute, The Minories has presented exhibitions by artists and designers including Joseph Robinson, Abram Games, Romek Marber, Noel Myles, Keith Albarn (father of Blur frontman Damon) and Chris Meigh-Andrews.

In October 2015, the cafe and tearoom in the back of the venue was taken over by Wilkin & Sons and was operated as the Batte-Lay Tearoom, whilst the gallery space remained under previous management. In October 2023 the cafe was taken over by local community group Common Ground Colchester, operating as The Commons.

Due to the COVID-19 pandemic the Colchester Institute decided not to reopen. The Victor Batte-Lay Foundation took back control and created a subsidiary body, We are the Minories with support from Arts Council England and the Cultural Regeneration Fund.

== The Friends of The Minories ==
The Friends of the Minories is an organisation which supports the gallery and assists in its funding. About four or five events occur each year, generally visits to local places of interest. The revenue from these fund-raising events goes into maintaining the garden and its 18th-century Gothic Folly. The garden and Folly are both registered with the Essex Gardens Trust.
