= Chris Meigh-Andrews =

English video artist, writer and curator

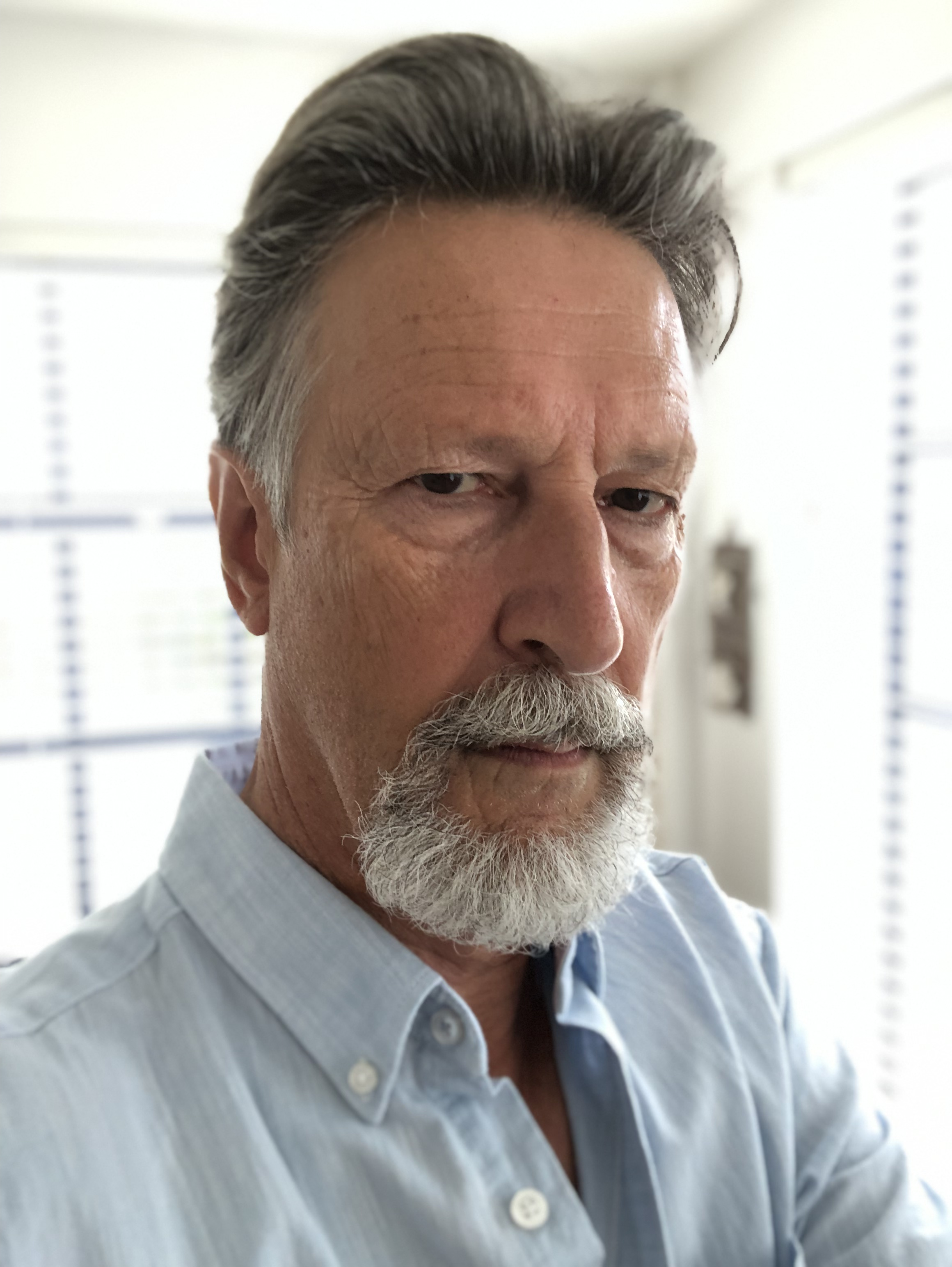
- Born: 30 July 1952 (age 74); Essex, England
- Known for: Video Art
- Website: www.meigh-andrews.com

Chris Meigh-Andrews is a video artist, writer and curator from Essex, England, whose work often includes elements of renewable energy technology in tandem with moving image and sound. He is professor emeritus in Electronic & Digital Art at the University of Central Lancashire and was Visiting Professor at the Centre for Moving image Research (CMIR) at the University of the West of England.

== Education and early career ==
Born in Essex, England on 30 July 1952, Meigh-Andrews lived in Montreal, Canada from 1957-75. Upon his return to England, he studied photography, film & video at the London College of Printing. His first art exhibition was part of the group photography show New British Image at Newcastle's Side Gallery in 1977. Beginning in 1978, Meigh-Andrews began producing art using video as a medium.

During the 1980’s his single screen video work was widely exhibited both nationally and internationally and by 1990 he expanded into sculptural and commissioned site-specific installations.

From 1981-1983, he attended Goldsmiths, earning an MA in Fine Art. In 2001, he was awarded a PhD from the Royal College of Art.

== Academic career ==
Meigh-Andrews began teaching in higher education during the late 1970s and early 1980s, following his emergence as an early practitioner of video art in the United Kingdom. He taught photography, film, video, and time-based media at a number of British art schools and institutions, including the London College of Printing, the London International Film School, Maidstone College of Art, and Leicester Polytechnic.

His principal academic appointment was at the University of Central Lancashire (UCLan), where he taught from 1986 until 2012. During his tenure he served as Head of Time-Based Media (1986–2000), Reader in Electronic and Digital Art (2000–2007), and Professor of Electronic and Digital Art from 2007 onward. He founded the Electronic and Digital Art Unit (EDAU) in 2004, establishing it as a centre for research, postgraduate study, and practice in electronic, digital, and moving-image art. Through EDAU he supervised research projects, organized exhibitions, conferences, publications, and international collaborations focused on media art, digital culture, and experimental moving-image practice.

At UCLan, Meigh-Andrews also contributed to the development of postgraduate curricula in fine art, digital media, and electronic arts. He co-founded the MA Fine Art programme and played a role in expanding research activity in time-based and digital art practices.

Following his retirement from full-time teaching, Meigh-Andrews was appointed Professor Emeritus of Electronic and Digital Art at the University of Central Lancashire. In this role he continued to contribute to research, publishing, curatorial projects, doctoral examination, and international academic collaboration. He has acted as an external examiner, PhD assessor, and visiting lecturer for universities and art institutions across Europe, North America, Asia, and Australia.

Between 2013 and 2017, he served as visiting professor at the Centre for Moving Image Research (CMIR) at the University of the West of England, Bristol, where he participated in research initiatives related to artists’ moving image, media archaeology, installation practice, and digital culture. His later academic work continued to bridge artistic practice and scholarship, combining research into the history of video art with investigations of emerging technologies, immersive environments, sustainability, and renewable-energy systems in contemporary art.

== The theme of renewable energy ==
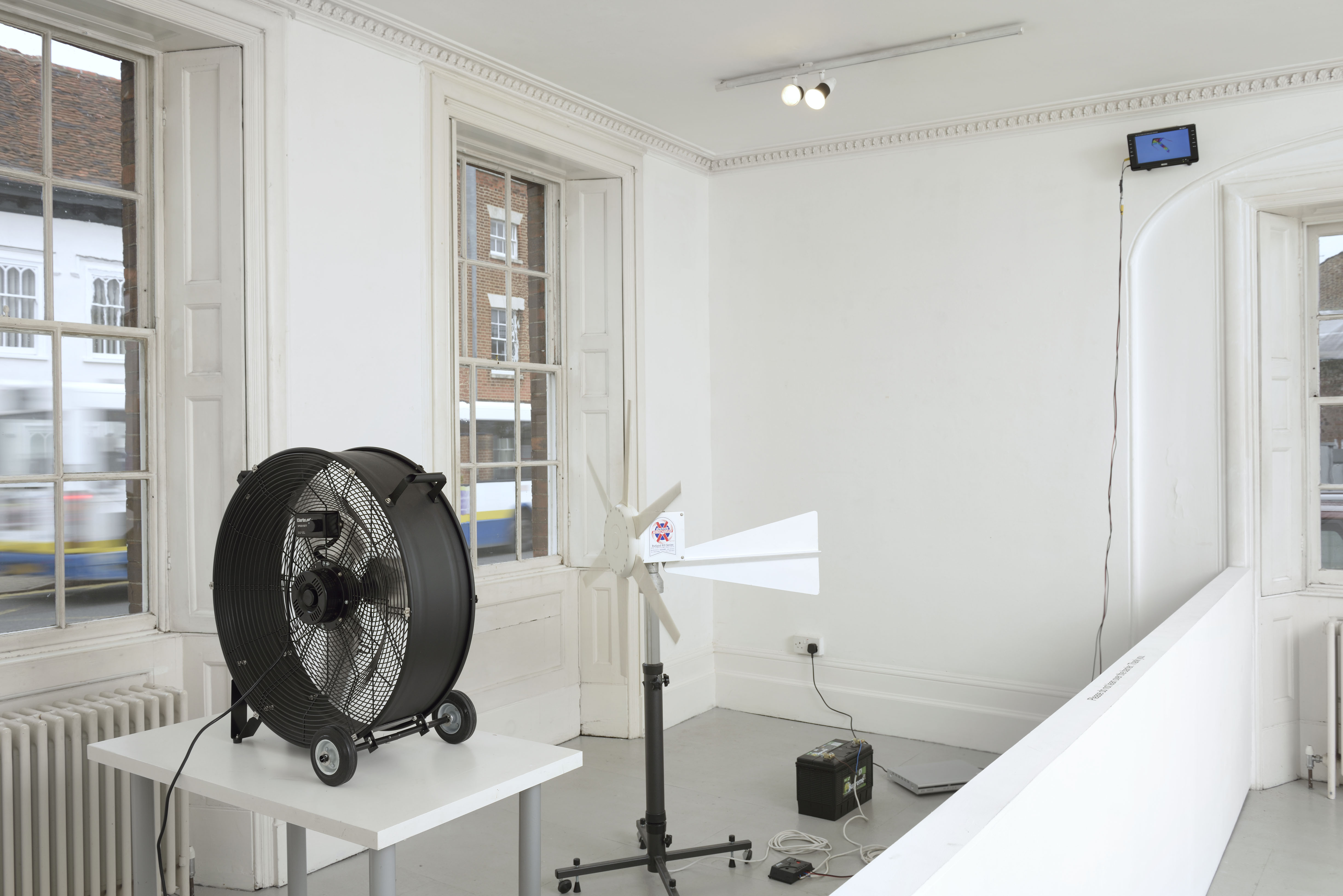
Perpetual Motion installed at Sculpting with Light & Time: Video and Installations 1978–2014, at The Minories Galleries

Many of the artist's more recent works have featured renewable energy sources intended to power the works and interact with the gallery space. 1994's Perpetual Motion featured a video monitor powered by a wind turbine, with the wind being supplied by a fan plugged into the gallery's power. Mothlight (1998) and Mothlight II (2001) featured solar-powered video screens powered by halogen lights. His 2002 installation 2002, For William Henry Fox Talbot (The Pencil of Nature) consisted of a solar-powered video camera at Lacock Abbey, reproducing a live image of William Henry Fox Talbot's 1835 photograph of a latticed window at the abbey (the world's oldest surviving photograph), then transmitted to the Victoria and Albert Museum in London. 2004's Interwoven Motion was an outdoor video installation in Grizedale Forest, Cumbria, made up of a wind- and solar-powered camera and screen, it produced video images displayed on a weatherproof LCD. 2005's Resurrection featured a series of solar panels mounted on a dead tree, powering a video display of the tree in its living form. And his 2011 installation Sunbeam used solar panels to power the projection of images of the sun from NASA’ s Solar Dynamics Observatory.

== Works and exhibitions ==
In 2009, Meigh-Andrews launched The Monument Project (Si Monumentum Requiris Circumspice). A digital video installation that ran online for three years, it consisted of a digital video camera mounted on the Monument in the City of London. The installation streamed 360-degree panoramic time lapse sequences of the city online, with displays modified by a computer in response to changes in weather. His 2012 solo project, In Darwin's Garden, was a web-based installation exhibited by the online journal Leonardo Electronic Almanac. Recorded in the grounds of the Down House in Kent, England (Charles Darwin's family home), the exhibition focused on an old mulberry tree growing behind the house. In 2013, the artist created "Aeolian Processes", an outdoor solar powered sound installation for "Art In Your Park" in Highfields Park, Nottingham, which reflected once again his underlying impulse to explore “the role of machine and its impact on human perception.” Likewise, participating in the project "La Lune: Energy Producing Art" at Long Reef in Sydney, Australia, he installed Aeolian Processes II (Box Revealing the Sound of its Own Making- After Robert Morris)

=== 2020- present ===
During the 2020s, Meigh-Andrews continued to develop an interdisciplinary practice that combined moving-image installation, panoramic video environments, solar-powered site-specific artworks, photography, sculpture, and scholarly research into the history and theory of media art. His recent work has focused on themes of landscape, environmental change, memory, duration, perception, and the relationship between technology and the natural world, while extending his longstanding interest in immersive and panoramic forms of visual experience.

Among his major projects of this period are a series of environmentally responsive installations. Truth is a Pathless Land (2023), created in homage to Jiddu Krishnamurti, was conceived as a site-specific outdoor solar-powered neon installation exploring questions of perception, knowledge, and spiritual inquiry. This followed Seek the Pattern that Connects (2022), a solar-powered site-specific neon installation inspired by the ideas of Gregory Bateson and commissioned for the Desert Equinox exhibition at Broken Hill, New South Wales, Australia. Both works reflect Meigh-Andrews's continuing engagement with ecological systems, renewable energy technologies, and the relationship between landscape and consciousness.

His interest in immersive moving-image environments continued through works such as Nothing Beside Remains (2022), a large-scale 360-degree panoramic video installation commissioned for exhibition Meta Landscapes at Valletta Contemporary, Malta. The work examined landscape, temporality, environmental transformation, and memory through an enveloping panoramic format, and subsequently appeared in a number of international screenings and exhibitions, including presentations at the Sound/Image Festival at the University of Greenwich, London, and Here & Now: Artists' Video from the UK at MuSA (The Virtual Museum of Sculpture and Architecture) in Pietrasanta, Italy. Earlier panoramic projects, including Climbing Mt Ishizuchi in the Autumn (2019), similarly explored immersive representations of landscape, place and duration through 360-degree moving-image technologies.

Other recent works demonstrate the diversity of Meigh-Andrews's artistic practice across multiple media. Impossible Object Number 7 (All the Water I Drank During Lockdown) (2020), a site-specific video installation presented in Colchester, reflected on everyday experience, measurement, and the passage of time during the COVID-19 pandemic. Portland Place (For A. L. Rees) (2021), a single-screen video work, paid tribute to the influential film and media scholar A. L. Rees, while Solar-Powered Bicycle Helmet (2021) combined sculptural form with renewable energy technology.

His visual art production during this period also included From the Monument (For Robert Hooke) (2021–2023), a limited-edition giclée print, and Found Sculptures No. 1 & 2 (2022), published by Valletta Contemporary in Malta.

In 2024 Meigh-Andrews produced Sky Sample (Homage to Yoko Ono), a mixed-media installation comprising a video monitor and media player accompanied by nine original handwritten postcards contributed by artists Beryl Korot, Gary Hill, Elaine Shemilt, Robert Cahen, Peter Campus, Madelon Hooykaas, Sei Kazama, Catherine Elwes, and John Gilles. The work revisited and extended ideas associated with Yoko Ono's conceptual practice through an international dialogue between pioneering media artists.

Alongside his artistic production, Meigh-Andrews remained highly active as a scholar, curator, and historian of media art. He published the chapter "Digital Moving Image Installations and Renewable Energy: 1994–2018" in Technology, Design and the Arts – Challenges and Opportunities (2020), examining the relationship between sustainability, renewable energy systems, and electronic art. He subsequently delivered invited lectures and presentations on the history of video art, panoramic moving-image environments, and multi-screen installation practices at institutions including the School of the Art Institute of Chicago, the University of Malta, and Hunter College, City University of New York.

His scholarly publications during this period included essays such as "The Exploration of Nature, Time and the Spiritual in the Video Installation Works of Madelon Hooykaas" and "Sound & Vision: Early Artist's Video and Music" (2023), both of which contributed to contemporary understanding of experimental video practices and media art history. In January 2025 he delivered the keynote address, Around & About: My Continued Fascination with the 360 Degree Panoramic View, at the First International Conference on Creative Arts (ICCA) at the University of the Punjab, Lahore, Pakistan.

One of Meigh-Andrews's most significant recent undertakings has been his role as Editor-in-Chief, (UK & Europe) together with Rachel Clarke and Vince Dziekan, of The Bloomsbury Encyclopedia of New Media Art. Scheduled for publication in 2025–2026 by Bloomsbury, this major international three-volume reference work surveys the history, theory, practice, curation, and cultural impact of new media art worldwide. The project represents the culmination of several decades of research, writing, and advocacy for the recognition and documentation of media art history, further consolidating Meigh-Andrews's position as both a pioneering media artist and a leading scholar in the field.

== Curatorial work ==
Meigh-Andrews has curated and co-curated numerous exhibitions devoted to video art and moving-image practice. His major curatorial projects include "Analogue: Pioneering Artists' Video from the UK, Canada and Poland (1968–88)", organized with Catherine Elwes, Peggy Gale and Łukasz Ronduda and presented at Tate Britain, Tate Modern and other international venues; Analogue & Digital at the Fieldgate Gallery, London (2007); Yes Snow Show, (2008/09), a retrospective exhibition of digital works by filmmaker and artist Michael Snow at the British Film Institute and Meta Landscapes: Representations & Perceptions, for Valletta Contemporary, Malta, 2022. Meigh-Andrews initiated and co-curated “Visions in the Nunnery” (2000 & 2002) with Marcel Baettig at Bow Arts, London and initiated and organized the "Digital Aesthetic" exhibitions (2001, 2007 & 2012) in collaboration with the Harris Museum and Art Gallery in Preston, exploring developments in digital and electronic art.[15]

== Awards and fellowships ==
Meigh-Andrews was Arts Council of England International Artist Fellow in Kraków from 2003 to 2004. He won a research endowment from the National Endowment of Science, Technology and the Arts (NESTA) in 2004. He has received British Council Travel Awards to visit Amsterdam (2004), Poland and Malta (2005) and Pakistan (2025). In 2010, he was awarded the Daiwa Anglo-Japanese Foundation Award, a travel grant to visit Tokyo, Kyoto and Nagoya to research into early artists' video in Japan.

Commissions include:

The Monument Project, (Si Monumentum Requiris Circumspice), Julian Harrap Architects and the City of London; Interwoven Motion; Foundation for Art & Creative Technology (FACT), Liverpool, and Grizedale Arts, 2004; Temporal View in Amsterdam, Huis Marseille Foundation for Photography, 2003; A Photographic Truth, Victoria & Albert Museum, London, 2001; Submerged, Bath Festivals Trust 1999; Cross-Currents; Camerawork, 1993; Streamline, Bluecoat Gallery, Liverpool, 1991 and Eau d’Artifice; Harris Museum, Preston, 1990.

== Solo exhibitions ==
- All the Water I Drank During Lockdown, 10 Trinity St, Colchester, August 2020.
- Some Impossible Objects: Four New Works, The Benham Gallery, Essex, Feb 2020
- The Sky is For All, Ruskin Gallery, Anglia Ruskin University, Cambridge, March 2019.
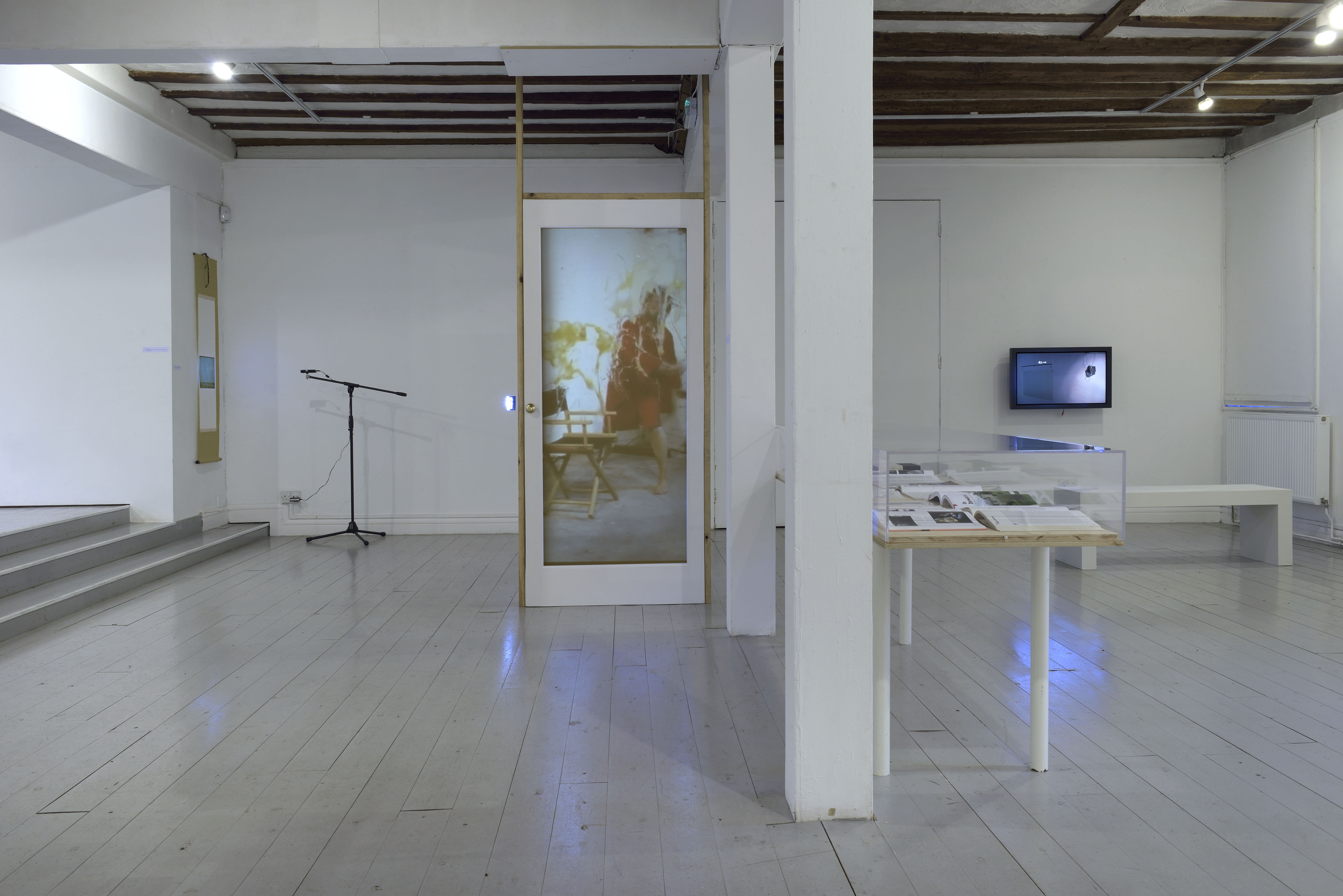
- Installation view from Sculpting with Light & Time: Video and Installations 1978–2014, at The Minories Galleries
  Sculpting with Light & Time: Video and Installations 1978–2014, The Minories Galleries, November 2014
- In Darwin’s Garden, Leonardo Electronic Almanac, August 2012
- The Monument Project (Si Monumentum Requiris Circumspice), Project Launch, Nunnery Gallery, London, March 2009* The Basement, Newcastle upon Tyne, 1982
- Wawel z Mostu Debnickiego, Galeria Sztuki Wspólczesnej, Kraków, 2004
- Mothlight II, 291 Gallery, London, June 2001
- Fenêtre Digitale, Galeri Brighi, Paris, 2000
- Mothlight, Rich Women of Zurich, London, 1999
- Glass Box Gallery, Salford, Greater Manchester, 1998
- Certosa di Calci/Museum of Natural History, Pisa, 1998
- Mind’s Eye, Hotbath Gallery, Bath, 1997
- Fire, Ice & Steam, Middlesbrough Gallery, Cleveland, 1995
- Vortex, Prema Arts Centre, Uley, Gloucester, 1995
- Perpetual Motion, Saw Contemporary Arts Centre. Ottawa, 1994
- Heaven & Earth, London Film-Maker's Co-op, 1992

== Major curatorial projects ==
- Digital Aesthetic (2001, 2007 and 2012), a collaborative exhibition between the University of Central Lancashire and the Harris Museum & Art Gallery.
- Yes Snow Show (2008-2009), an exhibition of work by filmmaker Michael Snow, co-curated with Elisabetta Fabrizzi, British Film Institute, London.
- Analogue: Pioneering Video from the UK, Canada and Poland: 1968-88, a touring exhibition co-curated with Catherine Elwes, Tate Britain & Tate Modern, London, Foundation for Art & Creative Technology, Liverpool, The Norwich Gallery, The Centre for Contemporary Art, Ujazdowski Castle, Warsaw, St James Cavalier Centre for Creativity, Valletta, MOCCA (Museum of Contemporary Canadian Art) Toronto, Arsenal Cinema, Berlin (2006–08); Ontario, Canada: Ottawa, Peterborough, Sarnia, Waterloo and Windsor (2008-2010).

== Bibliography ==
- Video-tapes, Installations, CD Roms 1978-1997, Chris Meigh-Andrews, University of Central Lancashire, 1998
- Video Installations, 1998/2004, Chris Meigh-Andrews, University of Central Lancashire, 2005
- Analogue: Pioneering Video from the UK, Canada and Poland (1968-88) - Catherine Elwes and Chris Meigh-Andrews, editors, EDAU, Preston, 2006
- Digital Aesthetic 2, Chris Meigh-Andrews, University of Central Lancashire, The Electronic and Digital Art Unit, 2008
- A History of Video Art: The Development of Form and Function, Chris Meigh-Andrews, Berg, Oxford and New York, 2006
- A History of Video Art (Revised Edition), Chris Meigh-Andrews, Bloomsbury London, 2013
- A History of Video Art (Japanese Edition), Chris Meigh-Andrews, translated by Shinsuke Ina, Sangensha, Tokyo 2013
- A History of Video Art (Chinese edition), China Pictorial Press, Beijing , 2018.
- The Encyclopedia of New Media Art, (3 vols), (with Rachel Clarke and Vince Dziekan), Bloomsbury, London & New York, 2025/26

He has also contributed chapters to edited works including:

- Early Video Art in the UK: 1960-1980, Early video Art in Europe- A Plural History, Les Presses du Reel,, Paris 2026.
- In Conversation with Steina and Woody Vasulka,Vasulka Reloaded: Vasulka Kitchen Reader 2, Center for New Media Art- Vasulka Kitchen, Brno, Czech Republic, 2025.
- “The Exploration of Nature, Time and the Spiritual in the Video Installation Works of Madelon Hooykaas”, The Artist as Explorer, Jap Sam Books, Amsterdam, 2023.
- “Sound and Vision: Early Artists’ Video and Music”, More Than Illustrated Music: Aesthetics of Hybrid Media between Pop, Art and Video, Katherine Drekmann and Elfi Vomberg, Eds, Bloomsbury, London and New York, 2023.
- Digital Moving Image Installations and Renewable Energy: 1994-2018”, Technology, Design and the Arts–Challenges and Opportunities, Springer Books, Cham, Switzerland, 2020.
- The Emergence of Early Artists’ Video in Europe and the USA and its Relationship to Broadcast TV, “Materializing Memories: Dispositifs, Generations, Amateurs”, Bloomsbury, (2018)
- “Chris Meigh-Andrews, Sculptural & Video Installations: 1989-95”, Experiments in Moving Image, Jackie Hatfield and Steve Littman, editors, Steve Epigraph Publications, London, 2004
- “Chris Meigh-Andrews: Early Video Tapes: 1978-87”, Experimental Film and Video, Jackie Hatfield, editor, John Libby Publishing, 2006
- “The Vasulka Tapes”, Vasulka Lab 1969-2005-Live Archive, Vivid, Birmingham, 2006
- “Interwoven Motion: steps towards a semi-permanent outdoor self-powered video installation”, The Itemisation of Creative Knowledge, Clive Gillman, editor, FACT/ Liverpool University Press, 2006
- “Peter Campus”, 100 Video Artists, Rosa Olivares, editor, Exit Publications, Madrid, 2010
- “Video Installation in Europe and the USA: The Expansion and Exploration of Electronic and Televisual Space: 1968-1988”, Expanded Cinema: Film Art Performance, Tate Publications, London, 2011
- “Optiks: Peter Campus”, and “In Conversation with Michael Snow”, The BFI Gallery Book, British Film Institute, London 2011
- “Location & Dislocation, Site & Architecture: Video Installation by Palestinian Artists” in Palestinian Video Art: Constellation of the Moving Image, ed. Bashir Makhoul, Palestinian Art Court-al Hoash, Jerusalem, 2013
