= Frederick Hans Haagensen =

Anglo-Norwegian artist

Frederick Hans Haagensen (23 September 1877–14 May 1943 ) was an Anglo-Norwegian visual artist and graphic artist. He often used the signature FH Haagensen. His attraction to nature and the sea can be traced back to his childhood memories of wandering the rural landscape of the estuary of the River Humber.

== Life and work ==
Haagensen was born in the English town of Grimsby in Lincolnshire in 1877 to Norwegian parents Peter Hendrik Haagensen (1837–1919) and Janna Haagensen (1837–1897). His father was a Norwegian shipowner who traded in timber and coal, and was for a time Norwegian and Swedish consul in Grimsby. The son regularly accompanied his father on business trips between Norway and Grimsby. His artistic education began with tutoring in Florence, and then with extensive travels to Scandinavia, Russia and the Baltic states to West Africa, Spain and Cuba. In 1899 at St James' Church in Grimsby he married Wilhelmina Grange Stephenson (1878–1965). The marriage was later dissolved.

He eventually settled in England, moving to Chelsea where he worked and lived with his English second wife, the artist Audrey Margherita Archer née Bussell (1900–1994), whom he married in 1932. Here he lived in the 1920s and after with his wife and children during the 1930s. He worked mainly with oil painting, watercolour, and charcoal, but also began to experiment with etchings. Eventually it became a medium he preferred even though he started it late in life, aged forty-seven. He had exhibitions as a graphic artist in New York, Boston and London, and his work was purchased by the Metropolitan Museum of Art, British Museum, Manchester Art Gallery and by private collectors. He travelled repeatedly from England to Norway to paint and draw nature there.

After discovering an older house in the Old Dutch style during a cycling trip in Essex, he decided to move there with his family. For the last seven years of his life he lived in the small village of Bradwell-on-Sea. After his death in Chelmsford in Essex he was buried in the old churchyard at Bradwell-on-Sea. His wife Audrey Haagensen organized after his death several exhibitions of his pictures in Grimsby, Kendal, Southend-on-Sea, Chelmsford, at The Minories, Colchester in 1972, at Little Baddow Hall Arts Centre in 1974 and at the Loughton House Gallery in London in 1977. She also arranged an exhibition of his artwork in Oslo in his old homeland; "For," stated Mrs. Haagensen, "despite his birth in Grimsby, he was of pure Norwegian blood." The Munch Museum bought several of his pictures. In 1977 she published a book of his etchings to mark the centenary of his birth.

== Exhibitions ==
- 1926: The Studio, Wellington Street, Chelsea, London [by private invitation];
- 1928: The Kew Gallery, USA
- 1929: The Shervee Gallery, Boston, USA; Abbey Gallery, London; 14 Great Stanhope Street, London;
- 1972: The Minories, Colchester, Essex; The Galeria, Maldon, Essex;
- 1974: The Little Baddow Hall Arts Centre, Essex;
- 1976: PS Tattershall Castle Art Gallery, London;
- 1977: Beercroft Gallery, Southend-on-Sea, Essex; Loughton House Gallery, London; Oslo Art Association, Norway; Doncaster Museum and Art Gallery, Yorkshire; Grimsby Art Gallery, Lincolnshire.

== Bibliography ==
- 1978: Haagensen, LYC Museum Banks, Brampton Cumbria
- 1976: Catalogue: Frederick Hans 1877-1943, The Butterfly Press, Malden Essex
- Haverkamp, Frode (1986): Oslo kunstforening 1936-1986. Oslo: Grøndahl. ISBN 8250408381 (ib.). s. 84, 110.
