= Norbert Francis Attard =

Maltese multi-disciplinary artist, art collector, gallerist and entrepreneur

Norbert Francis Attard (born 4 October 1951 in Sliema, Malta) is a Maltese multi-disciplinary artist, art collector, gallerist and entrepreneur known for his varied approaches to artistic projects, multi-media works, installations and anthropological-based projects.

== Early years ==
Attard started as a self-taught painter and graphic artist before turning to installation art in 1998. He graduated in Architecture from the University of Malta in 1977, practicing the profession as architect for twenty years until 1996. He lived in Germany in 1978/1979 working with the firm ‘Licht in Raum’, directed by Johannes Dinnebier, one of Germany’s pioneers in light design.

== Works ==
Whilst practicing the profession of architect for twenty years until 1996, he designed prints, posters, postage stamps and other works. Among Norbert Attard's numerous and most noteworthy artistic works one finds a growing collection of posters designed for various theatres national associations embassies and cultural institutions. On the same lines he has also designed a number of book covers and eight issues of Maltese postage stamps.

In 1998 he focused on installation art and has since then worked in various disciplines, merging expressions of architecture, sculpture, video and photography in different and various media. The relationship of his work to location and memory of site is crucial, as is his attempt to create a sense of balance and harmony through inter-relatedness of often contradictory themes and ideas.

In 1999, he represented Malta in the 48th Venice Biennale.

From 1998 to 2008 he created many site-specific installations in several countries and has participated in many collective international exhibitions in Scotland, England, Cuba, Austria, Italy, Spain, Germany, Liechtenstein, Turkey, Greece, South Korea, Australia, U.S.A., and Taiwan.

In 1999 he represented Malta at the 48th Venice Biennale, Italy.

Since 2001 he has been Director of GOZO Contemporary, an art space offering artist’s residencies on the island of Gozo.

Between 2002 and 2005 he was a Committee member of the Malta Council for Culture and the Arts.

== Valletta Contemporary ==
Attard is the founder of the Conceptual art gallery Valletta Contemporary. Opened in 2018, this gallery has established itself as one of the leading galleries in Malta offering space for exhibitions of a conceptual and contemporary nature. The gallery also curates VC Editions, a collection of artworks especially commissioned by the gallery by artists who have already exhibited at the venue.

== Exhibitions ==
- 1998 XIX Biennale of Alexandria, Egypt.
- 1998 Transkutan, Olympia Park, Munich, Germany.
- 1998 Breath, International Art Symposium, Chonju, South Korea.
- 1999 2nd Florence Biennale, Italy.
- 1999 Diaspora, International Art Meeting, Oviedo, Spain.
- 1999 48th Venice Biennale, Italy.
- 2000 Edinburgh City Art Centre, Edinburgh, Scotland.
- 2001 The Floating Land, International Site Specific Art Laboratory, Noosa, Queensland, Australia.
- 2002 2nd Liverpool Biennale, England, UK.
- 2002 Edinburgh International Arts Festival, Scotland, UK.
- 2003 Intervention I, Manningham Mills, Bradford, England, UK.
- 2003 Palestrina and Hell, Johanniterkirche, Feldkirch, Austria.
- 2003 Post-Civilisation, Kaohsiung International Container Festival, Kaohsiung, Taiwan.
- 2003 8th Havana Biennale, Cuba.
- 2003 Macedonian Museum of Contemporary Art, Thessaloniki, Greece.
- 2004 Nomadifesta, Kastelliotissa, Nicosia, Cyprus.
- 2004 ARTiade, Visual Arts of the Olympics, Athens, Greece.
- 2004 ART Expo, Mexico 04, Solaris / Observatorio, Michoacán, Mexico.
- 2004 K.A.I.R., Kamiyama, Tokushima Prefecture, Japan.
- 2005 Casoria Museum of Contemporary Art, Naples, Italy.
- 2005 Inspiration of Astronomical Phenomena, John David Mooney Foundation, Chicago, U.S.A.
- 2005 The Exhausted Body, Kaohsiung Museum of Fine Arts, Kaohsiung, Taiwan.
- 2005 Obsession, The International Video Festival, Galerie X, Istanbul, Turkey.
- 2005 Art’s Diary: Intervene, Taipei Artists Village, Taipei, Taiwan.
- 2005 Artists against Sedition Laws, Casula Powerhouse Arts Centre, Sydney, Australia.

== Publications ==
- 1978: While the Heart watches. Limited edition handmade box. Twelve poems by Michael Zammit and three signed lithograph prints by Norbert Attard.
- 1983: Norbert Attard, Artist in Malta, 1977–1983. Galleria De Amicis, Florence, Italy. Introduction by Dominic Cutajar. Foreword by Richard England.
- 1996: Norbert Attard, Prints and Paintings, 1977 - 1996. Roemer-und Pelizaeus Museum, Hildesheim, Germany. Edited by Dennis Vella. Foreword by Kenneth Wain. Additional writings by Dennis Vella, Meir Ronnen, Dominic Cutajar, Anne Musgrave, Richard England, Peter Serracino Inglott, Raphael Vella, Emmanuel Fiorentino, Rose Lapira and Theresa M. Vella. ISBN 99909-68-14-4.
- 2002: I See Red Everywhere. Carnyx, Glasgow, Scotland. Foreword by Richard Demarco. Introduction by Peter Serracino Inglott. Additional writings by Fiona Calder, Neil Cameron, Richard Carr, Richard Demarco, Emmanuel Fiorentino, Quentin Hughes, Paul Sant Cassia, Diane Sykes, Julian Treuherz, Raphael Vella, and Kenneth Wain. ISBN 1-903653-12-6.
- 2004: Norbert Francis Attard, Four Olympics. NY ARTS BOOKS, New York, USA. Edited by Dennis Vella. Critical Essay by Stanley Borg. Foreword by Tereza de Arruda. ISBN 0-9727451-0-6.
- 2007: Between Earth and Sky - Norbert Francis Attard. Midsea in collaboration with Heritage Malta. Main text edited by Ranier Fsadni. Additional editing by Lisa Gwen Baldacchino. Critical Essay by Richard England. Foreword by Aomi Okabe. Photography of Prehistoric Artifacts and Temples by Daniel Cilia. ISBN 99932-7-087-3.
