= Noel Myles =

English photographer (born 1947)

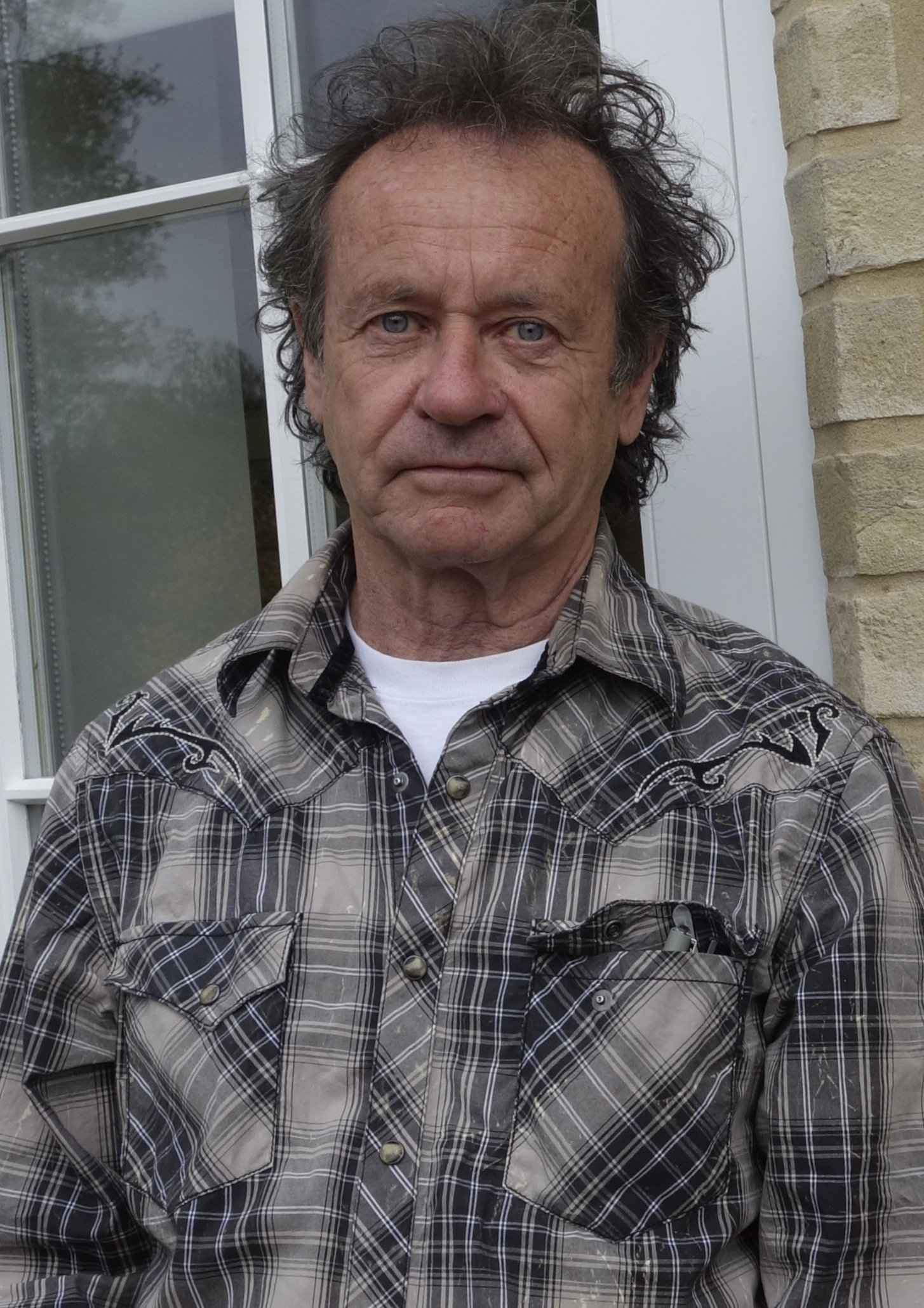
- Born: 1947 (age 78–79); London
- Education: Hornsey School of Art
- Known for: Photography, collage, printmaking
- Website: noelmyles.co.uk

Noel Myles (born 1947 in London) is an English artist who works with the still photographic image, extending it beyond the single moment and static viewpoint.

He was born in London in 1947 and lives and practices in Sudbury, Suffolk.

He is known for his large-scale collages composed of small individual photographs, taken from various view points and at different times, which when joined together make up a larger image.

More details of Myles' work can be found at Reframing Photography.

== Biography and work ==
Myles studied fine art at the Hornsey and Walthamstow School of Art between 1966 and 1970. From the 1980s on, Myles begun using etching techniques and produced a series of drawings in Cornwall of the sea and cliffs, some of which were shown at the Royal Academy. It was following this period that the artist began to experiment with photography. A chance encounter with an exhibition of 19th-century photography at the Royal Academy of Arts captivated the artist with its 'delicate, tactile qualities'.

Later, the artist received a grant from the University of East London to research Victorian printing processes including platinum prints. Myles had issues with the way in which photography had come to represent reality as ‘decisive moments,’ as photographer Henri Cartier-Bresson sought to capture. The artist started to explore different ways of capturing the ways that the human mind perceives events, and likewise, the way that memories are constructed.

David Hockney had previously pioneered the joiner technique of forming an image of a series of individual photographs and Myles started to use a similar technique in his work. He was awarded first prize in the Bradford Challenge at the NMPFT by Hockney in 1987.

Myles experimented with cyanotypes and platinum prints. When asked why he used platinum prints he responded "it was the most expensive, the most beautiful, the most traditional, the highest form of photographic print making that's ever been devised."

Many of Myles' photographs are of the countryside in eastern England. He works on collages often made up of hundreds of 35mm negatives. He also explores the space between still photography and film calling a series of his images Still Films.

Another collage by Myles, The Dragon Spirit, was made from a selection of 3,000 images that Myles took with a Nikon camera, with the final image being made from 300–400 of these pictures. He took over 12,000 photographs for the two commissions for ITN.

Myles' ideas about his work and photography have been expressed by the artist himself:

"The challenge I faced with photography was that the instantaneous static viewpoint, provided by the camera’s lens and shutter, didn't represent the continuous flow of the act of looking. It seemed as if the single-frame photograph had been held back to the level of the dictionary; the single word. It was the visual equivalent of overlooking the potential to link words to convey ideas and meaning. I couldn’t accept the notion of an isolated, decisive moment being capable of encapsulating our experience of life."

Myles considers himself foremost a photographer, but seeks to challenge some of the assumptions made about photography as an effective means to represent reality. He draws influence from painting using the texture, line, tone and colour as a painter would use brush strokes. He has described the process as "a question of pulling things together [and] harmonising them."

Part of Myles' process involves photographing the same scene or location multiple times at various times of day. This creates a layering of times in a single image. Myles uses long exposure photography, telephoto lenses and blur to create his desired effect emulating brush strokes.

Myles has exhibited at various locations and has been resident artist three times. Myles was artist in residence at ITN studios between October 1995 and 1996, Rowe and Maw in 1987 and 1995, and Shaftesbury PLC 1995.

== Selected exhibitions ==
- Altered State, Float. Showcase, 2018
- Earth, Sainsbury Centre for Visual Arts, 2013
- Between Photography, The Minories, Colchester, 2013
- Gainsborough's House, 2012
- V & A, 2008
- Stephanie Hoppen Gallery, London, 2003
- Zelda Cheatle Gallery, London, 2001
- L’Oeil Ecoute, Limoges, France, 1999
- Gainsborough's House, 1999
- The Gallery in Cork St, London, UK, 1995
- The Royal Photographic Society on three occasions
- National Museum of Photography, Film and Television; 1st prize winner Bradford Challenge, 1987
- National Portrait Gallery, London, 1986
- Serpentine, 1976
- Royal College of Art: Prizewinner London Group
- Royal Academy of Art on several occasions
- Contemporary Art Society
- Maison Du Limousin, Paris
- Mall Galleries: Prizewinner Discerning Eye
- Clare Hall, Cambridge
- Alison Richard Building, Cambridge

== Artist in residence ==
- Artist in residence for ITN on two occasions
- Shaftesbury plc in Chinatown
- Rowe and Maw on two occasions
