= Ladadika =

District of Thessaloniki, Greece

Coordinates: 40.635°N 22.937°E

Ladadika (Greek: Λαδάδικα) is the name of a historic district and a landmark area of the city of Thessaloniki, Greece.

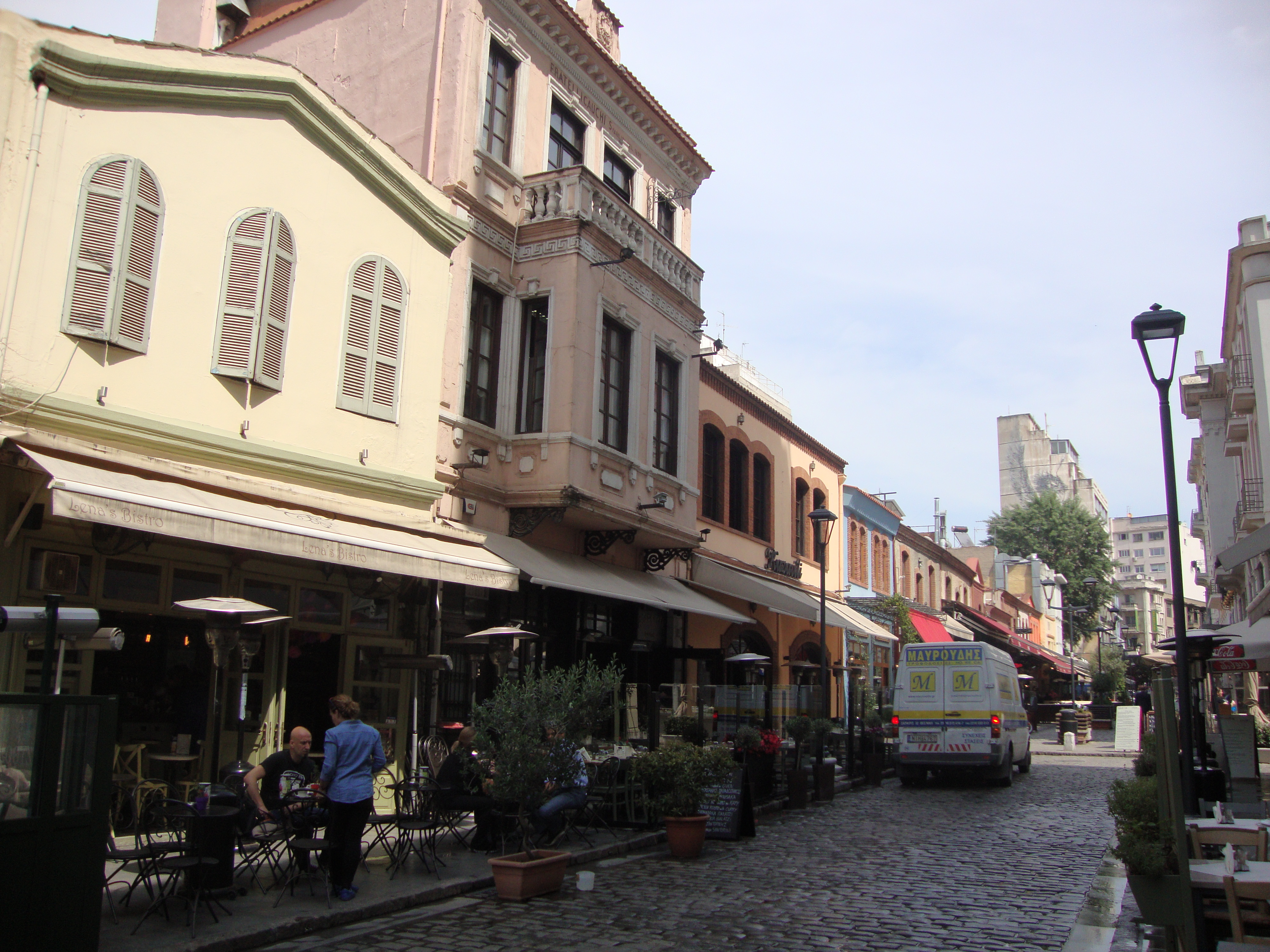
Street in Ladadika

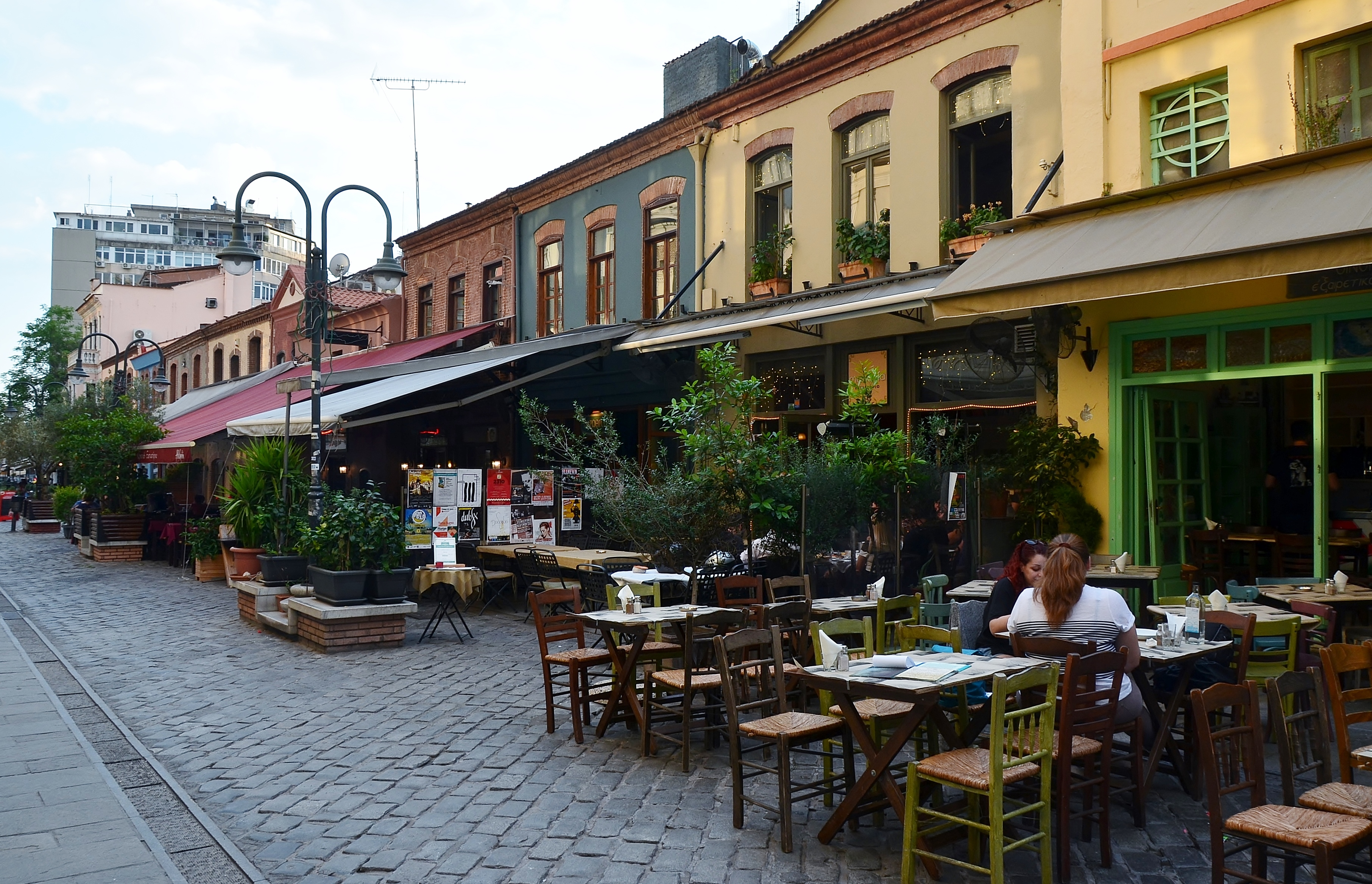
Restaurants in Ladadika

It is located near the Port of Thessaloniki and for centuries was one of the most important marketplaces of the city. Its name came about from the many olive oil shops in the area. Many Jews of the city were living there, while the so-called "Frankish district" (Frankomahala), with the French/Italian merchants and residents, was located beside.

In the years before World War I it made up the red light district, with the area starting to host many brothels. In 1985, Ladakika was listed as a heritage site by the Ministry of Culture. Its notable architectural style with 19th-century buildings is preserved and protected.

Nowadays, having undergone gentrification in the 1980s, Ladadika forms the entertainment district of the city, hosting bars, nightclubs, restaurants, and pubs in what used to be old oil stores and merchant warehouses, which spill out into a network of pedestrianized streets and small squares, like Morichovou Square, a popular place for tourists.

== Criticism ==
"The modernisation of commerce in the 19th century generated the replenishment of the typology of the markets and the stores. Ladadika, the market in the area of the harbour, is a characteristic example. It is a distinctive unit, which is differentiated from the surroundings (the basic core is surrounded by Tsimiski, Salaminas, Kountourioti and I. Dragoumi Streets), as it preserved to great extent the features of its original urban and architectural structure, despite the considerable change of use during the recent years, while the stores were converted into contemporary recreation centres as well as the so called ambiguous "embellishing" interventions of the owners and the municipality." "After the 1978 earthquake and the early 1980s, most of these heterogeneous buildings, the warehouses and shops where olive oil, spices and other foodstuffs were formerly traded - premises that later hosted scores of brothels - were gradually abandoned and the area degenerated into third-world conditions. It was then that the first thoughts were expressed on the overall regeneration, which commenced in the early 1990s. Fortunately, the buildings were saved from demolition due to possible changes in the street system, but the logic of tasteless stage set was adopted. In just a few years the wider area was turned into a "fun park" of dubious aesthetics, as the traditional functions of trade, typical of the harbour marketplace, had been curtailed to the minimum."

== Gallery ==
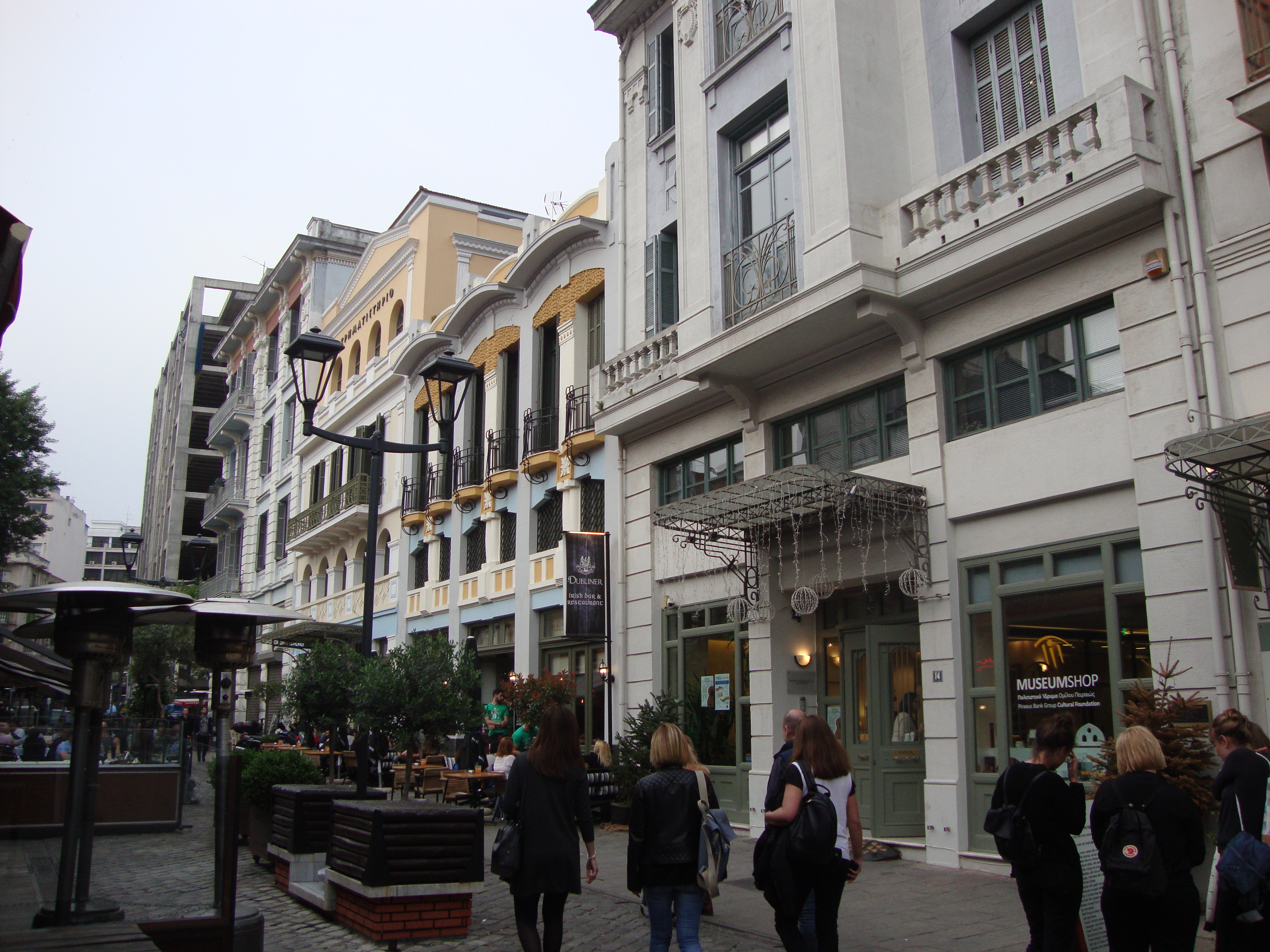
Katouni Street

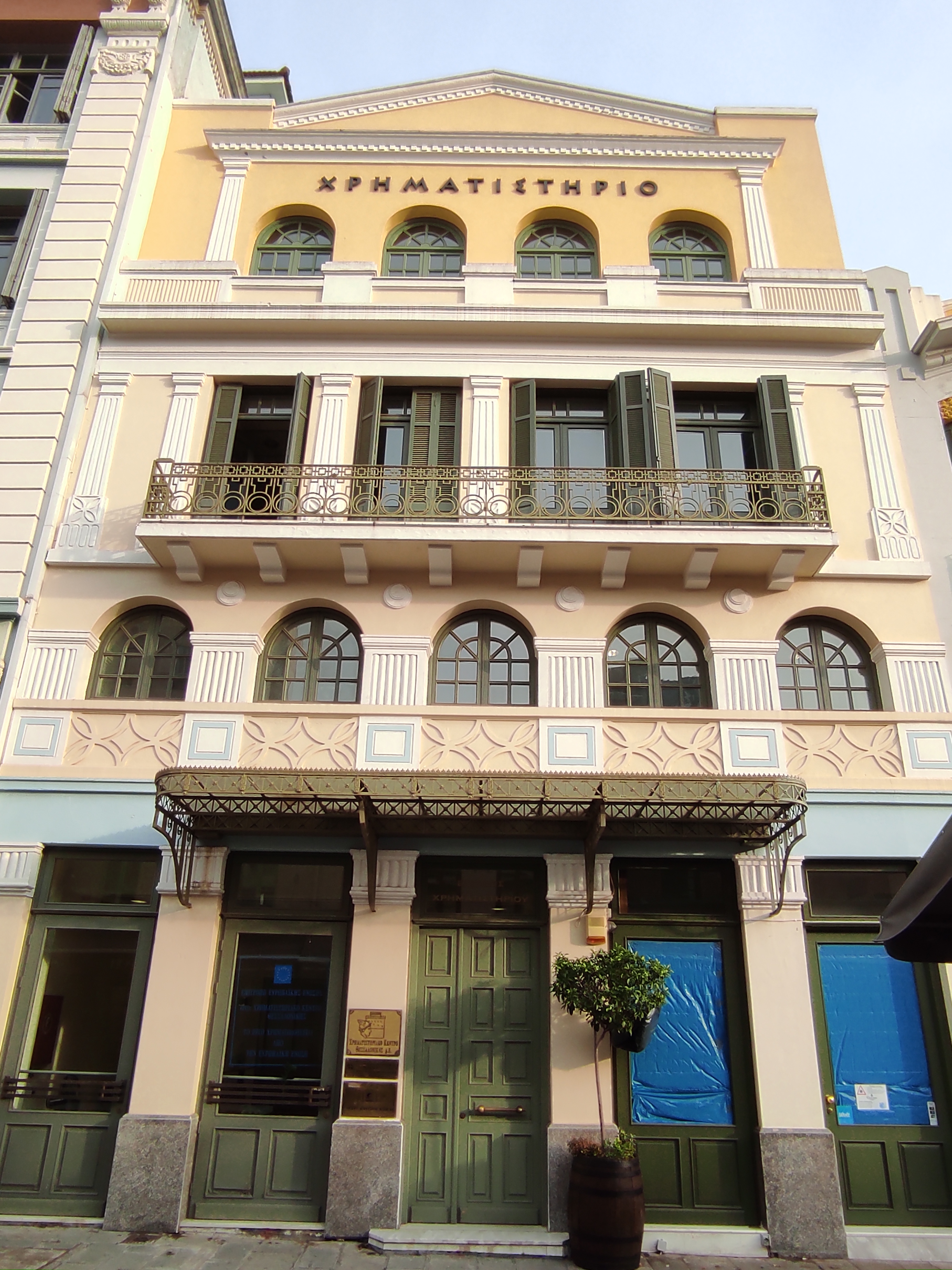
Matarasso building (stock exchange)

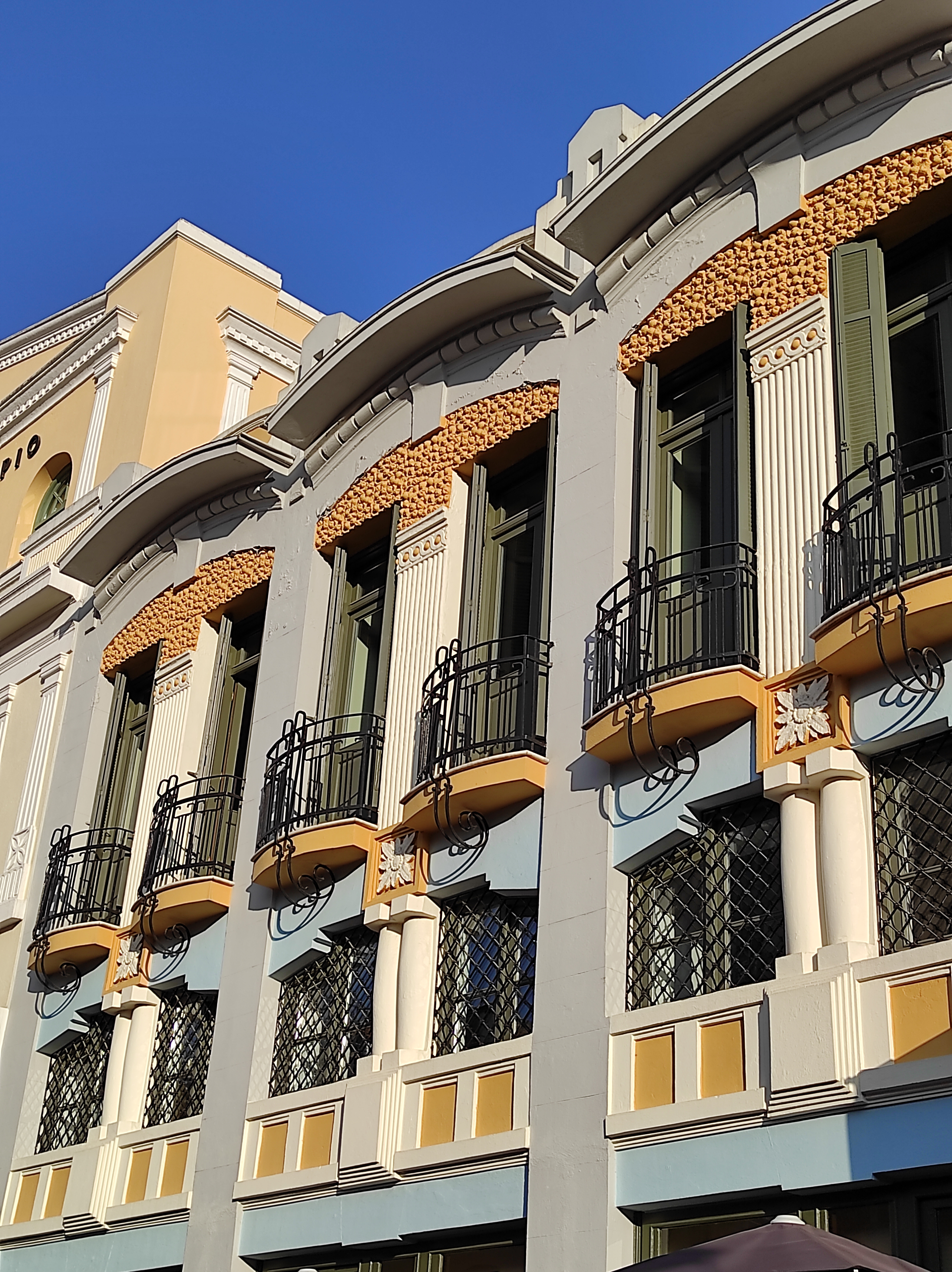
Errera mansion

== See also ==
- Bensousan Han
