= Bensousan Han =

Historic building in Thessaloniki, Greece

Coordinates: 40.636104°N 22.937949°E

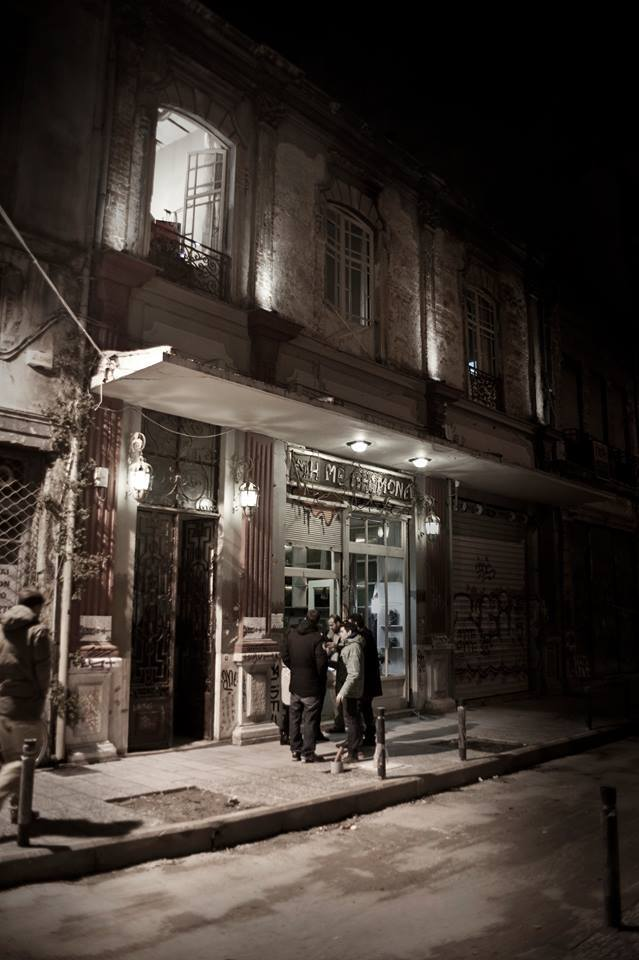
Image taken from the "default4" exhibition, October 2014, that took place in Bensousan Han

Bensousan Han (or Bensoussan Han, Greek: Μπενσουσάν Χαν or Χάνι του Μπενσουσάν) is a building in Thessaloniki's upper Ladadika region (or Istira area), on Edessis street.

The foundations and the ground floor were built since 1810 according to the Ottoman archives. Soon the first floor was complete and the building as a whole was a motel.

It belonged to Samuel Bensousan, a Jewish citizen of Thessaloniki, who during the last century of the Ottoman era, kept operating the building as a motel or inn ("han" in Turkish language means motel, inn or even small caravanserai). Bensousan Han survived the Great Thessaloniki Fire of 1917 and kept its use as a motel until c.1930.

From then on it has been successively an exotic food store, a spice shop, a tuck shop, a fabric shop as well as a coffee shop. Its last post war use was as a customs office at the end of the 1970s. Then it was abandoned for almost 30 years.

Since 2007 it has been gradually rediscovered by the artistic community of Thessaloniki and today it holds theatrical and cultural events, exhibitions and festivals.
