= David Bensoussan =

Moroccan engineer and novelist

David Bensoussan (born 1947) is a Moroccan-Canadian author and educator. Bensoussan has worked in the Department of Electrical Engineering at the École de technologie supérieure of the Université du Québec since 1980. He is best known for his histories of the Jewish community of Morocco and for his leadership roles in the Sephardi Jewish community. He has served as President of the Communauté Sépharade Unifiée du Québec (United Sefardic Community of Quebec).

== Biography ==
Bensoussan holds a PhD in Electrical Engineering from McGill University.

He was born in Mogador, and lived there until the family moved to a larger city when he was eight. His family left Morocco for Israel in 1965 when he was a teenager. He earned his first degree in Israel, and moved from Israel to Canada in 1976.

In addition to his work as a professor and occasional employment in the tech sector, Bensoussan is author of a self-published, three-volume study of the Bible, La Bible Prise au Berceau, prefaced by biblical scholar André Chouraqui, in which he claims to have integrated historical, archaeological, and ethical analysis of the text.

== Civic involvement ==
Until 2012, Bensoussan served as a sitting member of the Paul Martin and Stephen Harper government's Cross-Cultural Roundtable on Security. Established in 2005, the panel brought together prominent members from a number of Canada's cultural communities and government entities to discuss policy and program issues, and to promote dialogue and strengthening understanding between the national authorities and its electorate.

Bensoussan actively supported Irwin Cotler when he stood for Parliament. He has served as vice president of the Canadian Jewish Congress.

== Writing ==
Bensoussan won the Prix Haïm Zafrani, a literary prize, in 2012 for his 2010 book, Il était une fois le Maroc. A second edition of the book was published, with more lavish illustrations.

Bensoussan's books about and knowledge of the Jews of Morocco are referred to by the growing number of scholars and other groups interested in the history and ethnography of the Moroccan Jewish community. He has testified on the subject at Parliamentary inquires in Canada.

Bensoussan has published essays in La Presse.,HuffPost, La voix sépharade, and his own blog.

Bensoussan has published two novels (La rosace du roi Salomon and L'énigme du roi Salomon), a memoir (Le fils de Mogador), two historical essays (L'Espagne des trois religions : grandeur et décadence de la convivencia and Il était une fois le Maroc), and, with Asher Knafo, an art book about illuminated Jewish marriage contracts (Mariage juif à Mogador).

== Books ==
- La Bible prise au berceau, Éditions Du Lys, Montréal, 2002 ISBN 2-922505-01-4, 388p.
- Témoignages - Souvenirs et réflexions de oeuvre de l'Alliance Israélite Universelle, in collaboration with Edmond Elbaz, Éditions Du Lys, Montréal, 2002, ISBN 2-922505-16-2
- L'Espagne des trois religions : grandeur et décadence de la convivencia, L'Harmattan, Paris, 2007 ISBN 9782296041349
- Mariage juif à Mogador Éditions Du Lys, Montréal, 2004 ISBN 978-2-922505-15-3
- Le fils de Mogador, Éditions Du Lys, Montréal, 2002, ISBN 9782922505214
- Il était une fois le Maroc - Témoignages du passé judéo-marocain, Éditions Du Lys, Montréal, 2010, ISBN 978-2-922505-21-4, Editions iuniverse 2012, ISBN 978-1-4759-2608-8
- L'âge d'or sépharade en Espagne Éditions Du Lys, Montréal, ISBN 2-922505-20-0,202 p., 2006
- La rosace du roi Salomon, Les Éditions Du Lys, 2011, ISBN 978-2-922505-23-8
- L'énigme du roi Salomon, iuniverse, 2012, ISBN 978-1-469764-36-8
- Antologie des écrivains sépharades du Québec, Éditions Du Marais, Montréal, 2010, ISBN 978-2-923721-13-2
- Isaie - Lecture commentée, Éditions Du Lys, Montréal, 2014, ISBN 978-2-922505-24-5, Éditions du Marais, Montréal, 2014, ISBN 978-2-923721-52-1, 278p.
- Chroniques des présidents de la Communauté, Présence sépharade au Québec, 1966-2022, Éditions Balzac, Montréal, 2023, ISBN 2921468840 198p
- Va mon bien-aimé - Lekha Dodi, Éditions Du Lys, Montréal, 2016, ISBN 978-2-922505-25-2
- Florilèges, Éditions Du Lys, Montréal, 2024, ISBN 978-2-922505-26-9, 344p.
- L'arc-en-ciel du Cantique des cantiques, Éditions Du Lys, Montréal, 2024, ISBN 978-2-922505-27-6, 340p.

Technical books:

- David Bensoussan, Anaïs Le Mouroux. 2023 « Réseaux mobiles et satellitaires : principes, calculs et simulations ». : Presses de l'Université du Québec. 600 p.
- Christian S. Gargour, Marcel Gabrea, David Bensoussan, Venkat Ramachandran. 2018 « Théorie et conception des filtres analogiques ». Québec : Presses de l'Université du Québec. 592 p.
- David Bensoussan. 2008 « Commande moderne : approche par modèles continus et discrets ». Montréal, Canada : Presses Internationales Polytechnique. 396 p.
- David Bensoussan. 2008 « Téléphonie numérique et téléphonie IP ». Québec : Presses de l’Université du Québec. 252 p.
- David Bensoussan. 2003 « Liaisons sans fil fixes pour la téléphonie ». Montreal, Canada : École de technologie supérieure. 171 p.
- David Bensoussan. 2001 « De la téléphonie numérique à la téléphonie Internet ». Montréal : École de technologie supérieure. 239 p.
- David Bensoussan. 2000 « Introduction à la communication par fibre optique : une approche pratique ». Montréal, Canada : École de technologie supérieure. 176 p.
- Christian S. Gargour, V. Ramachandran, David Bensoussan. 1993 « Théorie et conception des filtres analogiques ». Montréal, Canada : Presses de l’Université du Québec. 652 p.
- D. Bensoussan. 1984 « Emisores y receptores principios, propiedades, funciones ». Madrid : Instituto Oficial de Radio y Televisión. 107 p.
- D. Bensoussan. 1984 « La modulación : principios y métodos ». Madrid : Instituto Oficial de Radio y Televisión. 111 p.
- D. Bensoussan. 1984 « Reproducción del sonido ». Madrid : Instituto Oficial de Radio y Televisión. 134 p.
- David Bensoussan. 1983 « Las Antennas ». Espagne : Instituto oficial de radio y television.
- D. Bensoussan. 1981 « Émetteurs et récepteurs ». : Dunod. 101 p.
- David Bensoussan. 1981 « Reproduire le son : microphones et haut-parleurs ». Paris : Dunod. 133 p.
- D. Bensoussan. 1980 « La modulation : principes et méthodes ». Paris; Montréal : Dunod; Teccart. 104 p.
- David Bensoussan. 1980 « Les Antennes ». Paris : Dunod. 152 p.
- David Bensoussan. 1978 « Cours sur les communications : 26 brochures d'enseignement ». Montréal : Institut Teccart.
- G. Zames, D. Bensoussan. 1985 « Multivariable Feedback and Decentralized Control ». In Decentralized/Distributed Control and Dynamic Systems vol. 1. p. 373-391. (Collective book) Academic Press
- Brossard, J., Hammami, M., Bensoussan, D. (2022). Nonlinear Robust Control for Quadrotor. In: Zattoni, E., Simani, S., Conte, G. (eds) 15th European Workshop on Advanced Control and Diagnosis (ACD 2019). ACD 2019 2018. Lecture Notes in Control and Information Sciences - (Collective work), ISBN 978-3-030-85317-4. Springer.
