= Valletta Contemporary =

Contemporary art gallery in Malta

Coordinates: 35°53′48″N 14°30′52″E

Valletta Contemporary (VC) is an independent exhibition space located in Valletta, Malta, which opened in April 2018. Operated by the Norbert Francis Attard Foundation (formerly META Foundation), the gallery is housed in a renovated warehouse on East Street close to St. Barbara Bastions and the Lower Barrakka Gardens.

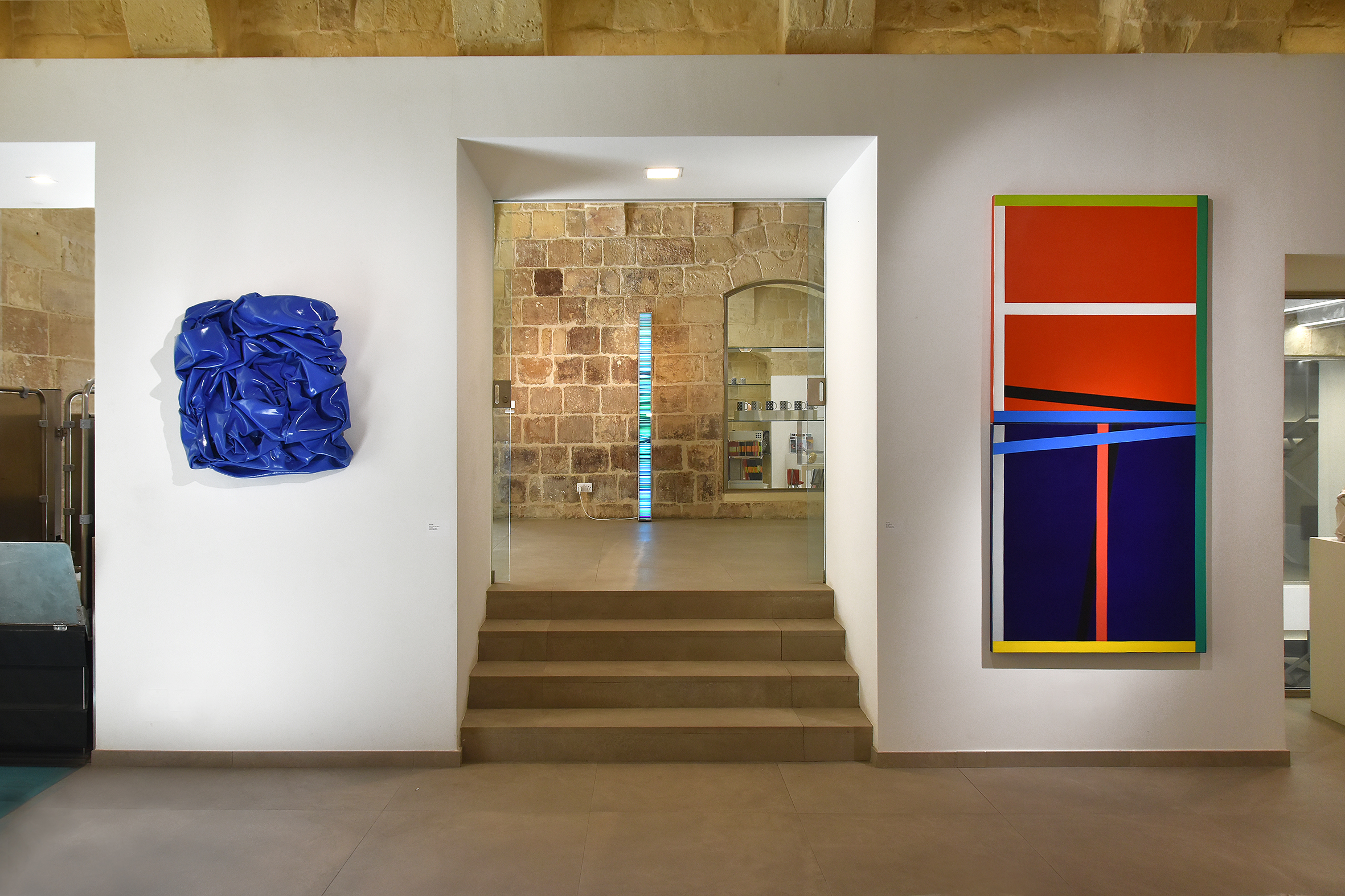
Valletta Contemporary Art Space, Valletta, Malta

== Art space ==
Valletta Contemporary operates as a non-profit art space and is affiliated with the contemporary art platform Ocula.

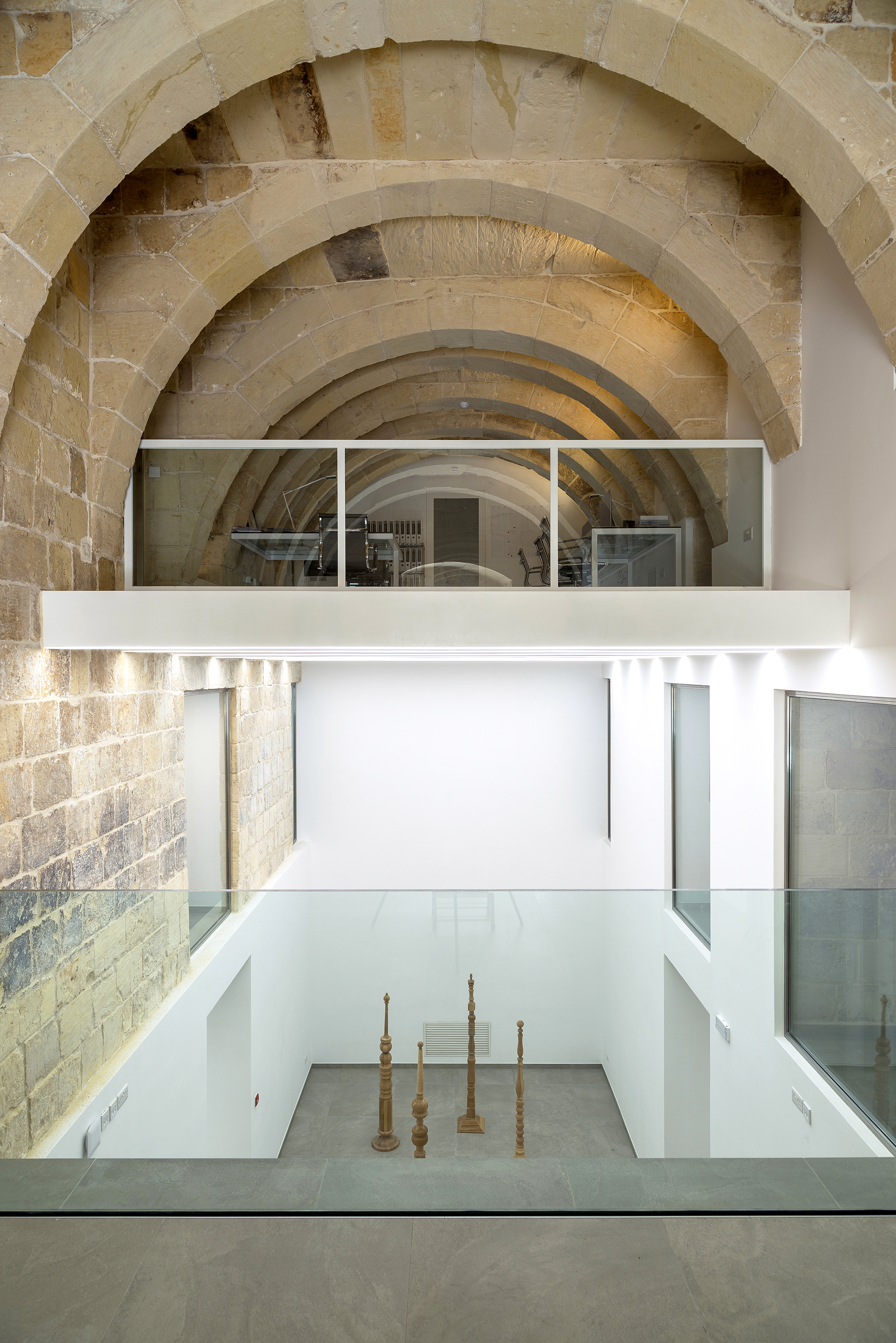
VC Main Hall

The gallery was founded by artist and architect Norbert Francis Attard, who also oversees its operations. The exhibition space is housed in three adjoining converted warehouses, a project completed over approximately ten years.

== Exhibitions ==
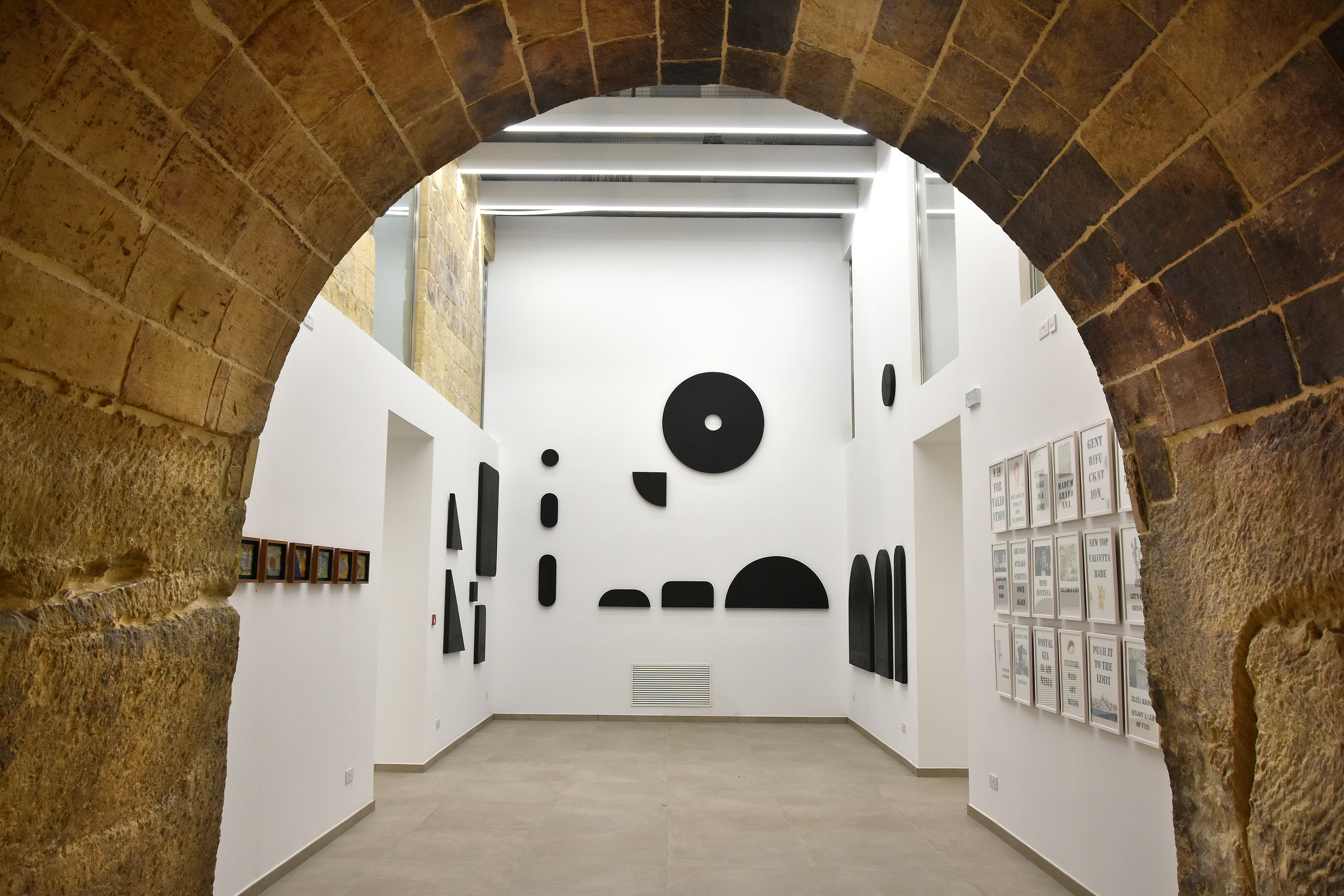
VC Art Space, Valletta, Malta

Valletta Contemporary hosts exhibitions featuring local and international contemporary artists. Previous exhibitions include:

- Here & Now (2018)
- Traces (2019)
- Tabita Rezaire (2019)
- French Idea[L] (2019), curated by Olivier Plique
- Diktat (2019), a solo exhibition by Eric Meier
- Up to Now (2020), featuring artists such as Damien Hirst, Brian Eno, Hans Kotter, Eberhard Bosslet, and others
- Playful Futures (2021)
- Cumulus (2024), featuring 29 artists including Ai Weiwei, Tracey Emin, Alicja Kwade, and Ilya Kabakov

== VC Editions ==
VC Editions is a programme that commissions artworks from selected artists and makes them available through the gallery. It has included both Maltese and international artists whose work has previously been exhibited at the gallery.

== Events ==
In December 2019, Valletta Contemporary hosted the MET(a) Gala, a fundraising event featuring contemporary art and fashion.

In October of the same year, the MICAS International Art Weekend included talks held at the gallery with speakers including Sir Norman Foster.
