= Ruth Bensusan-Butt =

English general practitioner (1877–1957)

- Born: 1877; Anerley, UK
- Died: 1957 (aged 79–80); Colchester, UK
- Occupation: Physician
- Children: 3, including David and John

Ruth Bensusan-Butt (née Bensusan; 1877 – 1957) was an English physician who was the first woman physician in Colchester.

== Biography ==
Bensusan was born in 1877, in Anerley, to a Jewish family. Her father was an ostrich feather merchant. She was also the sister-in-law of the painter Lucien Pissarro, who had married Esther Bensusan, her older sister.

After the family moved to Upper Norwood, she went to Sydenham High School. She trained at the University of Zurich, the Royal Free Hospital, and in Dublin, and qualified in 1904. She spent several years in Italy and was married in Naples in 1910.

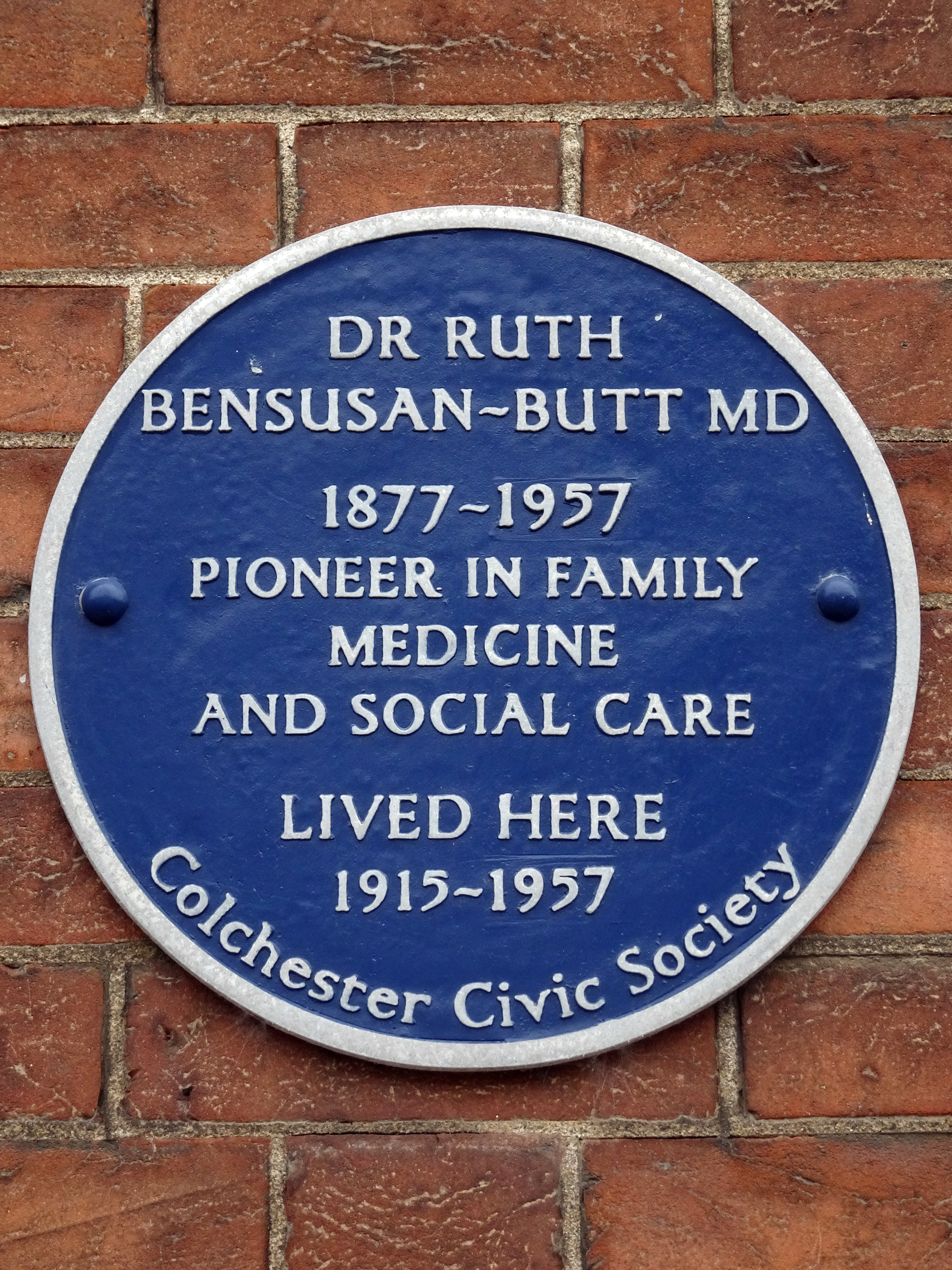
Plaque commemorated Dr. Bensusan-Butt, erected by Colchester Civic Society on 5 June 2016

After an earthquake struck Italy in 1907, Bensusan organised food, medical supplies and clothes for the refugees from Rome. She later sailed, along with doctors Caroline Matthews and Worthington, to the scene of the quake in Calabria.

In 1909, she went to the Fabian Society summer school in North Wales and became an active suffragist, sometimes marching in her medical gown. She sold copies of the Webbs' Minority report on the Poor Law.

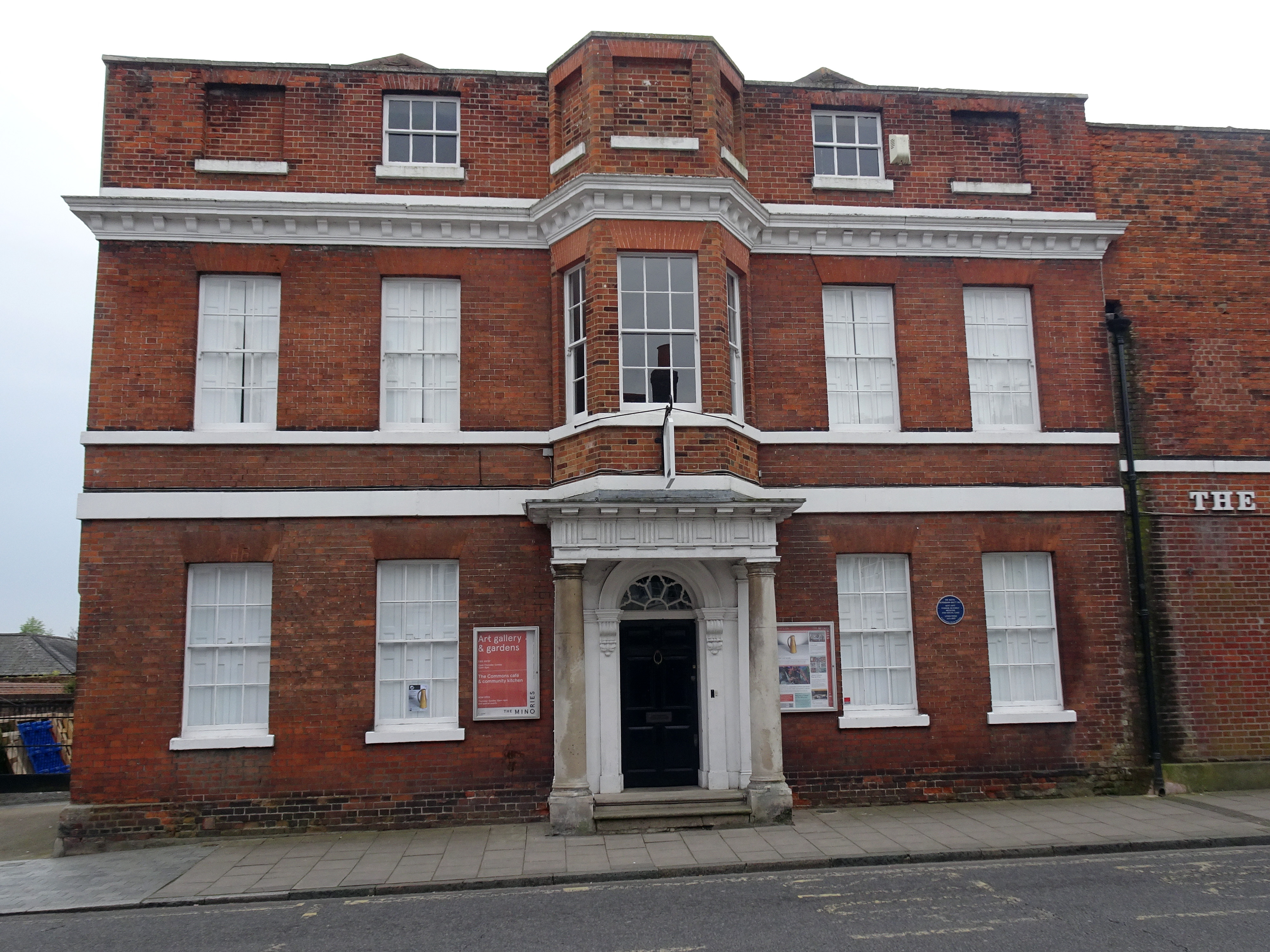
74 High Street Colchester, Bensusan's home from 1915-1957

In 1910, she and her husband moved to Colchester. Her husband, Geoffrey Crawford Butt, initially worked as an accountant in the town. Later, they bought The Minories in 1915. Bensusan used the front rooms as her consulting rooms, and also opened Colchester's first infant nursery there. Bensusan was known to her patients as "Dr. Ruth" or "Ben".She sold the building and the garden to the Victor Batte-Lay Trust in 1956.

Bensusan became an active member of the Socialist Medical Association and organised a debate on "A State Medical Service" at the Colchester branch of the British Medical Association in January 1932. She became President of the Colchester Medical Society in 1934.

She had three children, John, a landscape artist, Barbara, and David, an economist. Barbara and David were twins. She died on 1957, aged 79 or 80.

A blue plaque in her memory was placed at The Minories in 2017.
