= Moses Bensusan =

Canadian-American businessman (born 1968)

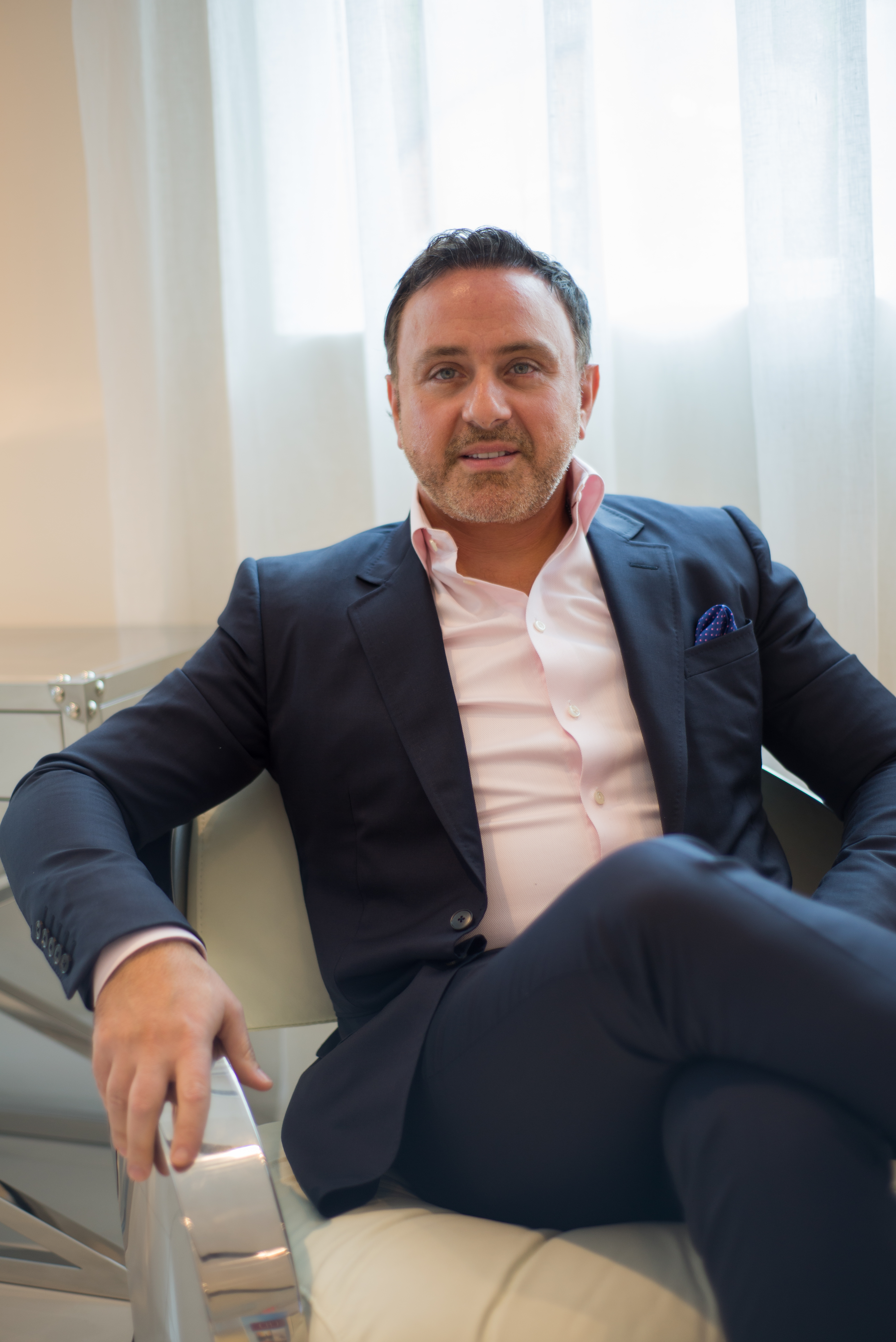
- Self-portrait photograph
- Born: December 30, 1968 (age 57); Tangier, Morocco
- Political party: Independent

Moses Bensusan (born 30 December 1968) is a Moroccan-Canadian-American real estate developer. He is the CEO of Liberty Grande, LLC a real estate development company and CEO/President of Logictech Construction Group, LLC, a development and general contracting company, one of the top construction companies in the South Florida area.

== Biography ==
Bensusan was born in Tangier, Morocco and raised in Spain. He migrated to South Florida in the United States in 2007.

=== Liberty Grande / Logictech ===
Shortly after moving to Florida, Bensusan formed a real estate development company, Liberty Grande, LLC, in 2009.

In 2009, Bensusan's company acquired the Logictech Construction Group, a development and general contractor. Logictech was later named one of the top 25 construction companies in South Florida by South Florida Business Journal in 2012. The group now consists of a team of design and construction professionals. Bensusan is CEO of Liberty Grande and Logictech.

=== Costa Hollywood village ===
Bensusan, through his companies Liberty Grande and Logictech, acquired property for the development of a residential community, Costa Hollywood Village, in South Florida. The project broke ground in June 2013. Initially slated to be completed in 2016, the project will consist of over 307 condo resorts plus restaurants and other amenities. The community is located at 777 North Ocean Drive, Hollywood, Florida. The architect for the project is Hamed Rodriguez Architects and the construction is being undertaken by Liberty Grande, with general contractors Beauchamp Construction and Baker Concrete Construction.
