= David Bensusan-Butt =

English economist (1914–1994)

David Miles Bensusan-Butt (24 July 1914, Colchester – 25 March 1994, London) was an English economist who spent much of his career in Australia. Known as David, he published his work as D. M. Bensusan-Butt.

== Background and education ==
A nephew of Esther Bensusan, the wife of Lucien Pissarro, and the son of Jewish socialist Ruth Bensusan-Butt (1877–1957), the first woman doctor to work in Essex, Bensusan-Butt was educated with his older brother John at Gresham's School, Holt, and then at King's College, Cambridge, where he was a student of John Maynard Keynes and indexed Keynes's magnum opus, the General Theory of Employment, Interest and Money. Bensusan-Butt acted as an assistant to Keynes, for searching literature and writing references, making him Keynes's best-informed student on progress with the project, so that one historian of economics has described him as 'the favoured man'.

== Career ==
After a short period working for The Economist, Bensusan-Butt joined the civil service in 1938. Early in the Second World War he became private secretary to Frederick Lindemann, 1st Viscount Cherwell, then worked for Winston Churchill. While he was First Lord of the Admiralty, Churchill created a Statistical Section in the Admiralty which was joined by Bensusan-Butt, Roy Harrod, Bryan Hopkin, Douglas MacDougall and Tom Wilson.

At Cherwell's recommendation, Butt did an analysis of the effectiveness of Bomber Command. Reviewing 600 photoreconnaissance images, Butt did a statistical analysis of the attacks completed in June and July 1941. The resultant Butt Report showed that Bomber Command was having great difficulty delivering its bombs over its targets, with only 5% of bombers setting out bombed within 5 mi (8.0 km) of the target. This report was a key impetus to the formation of Bomber Command's Pathfinder Force, which greatly improved the accuracy and destructive power of Bomber Command.

In September 1944, Bensusan-Butt was commissioned as a Temporary Sub-Lieutenant into the Royal Naval Volunteer Reserve, serving on the minelayer HMS Cyclone.

Following the war, Butt moved to the Economic Section of the Cabinet Office and later the Treasury. From 1949 to 1950 he was seconded to the Australian Prime Minister's Department, and he spent two periods of one year at Nuffield College, Oxford as a research fellow, in 1953–1954 and 1958–1959.

In 1962, he became a professorial fellow in the Research School of Pacific and Asian Studies (RSPAS) of the Australian National University, remaining there for fifteen years. In 1975–1976 he was the most influential member of the Asprey Committee on tax reform, recommending a dramatic change from a complicated system of income taxes to a broad-based consumption tax.

In 1976, he retired to London, settling in part of the 17th-century house at Stamford Brook of his uncle by marriage Lucien Pissarro.

== Selected publications ==
- On Economic Growth: an Essay in Pure Theory (Oxford: Clarendon Press, 1960)
- On Economic Man: an Essay on the Elements of Economic Theory (Canberra: Australian National University, 1978)
- 'A Model of Trade and Accumulation' in American Economic Review 44 (1954), pp. 511–529
- 'Keynes's General Theory, Then and Now', in On Economic Knowledge, a sceptical legacy ed. D. M. Bensusan Butt (Canberra: Australian National University, 1967)

== Quotations ==
- "The ultimate fruits of civilization are slow growths that need a stable environment."
