= Eddy Bensoussan =

Brazilian physician

Eddy Bensoussan (born 1938 in Rio de Janeiro) is a Brazilian physician.

Bensoussan graduated in 1962 with a specialty in occupational diseases, internal medicine and clinical physiopathology. He served as director of the Occupational Health Division of the Rio de Janeiro State University Hospital, and as director-general of the School of Medicine of the Rio de Janeiro State University.

He has co-authored many books and papers on medical education and hospital management. His Clinic Examination Manual (Ed.Cultura Medica, Rio de Janeiro) was a standard textbook for medical students for 20 years.

== Works ==
- Manual do Exame Clínico (co-author Fernando Bevilacqua)
- Fisiopatologia Clínica (co-author Fernando Bevilacqua)
- Saúde ocupacional
- Medicina e meio-ambiente
- Manual de Higiene, Segurança e Medicina do Trabalho" (Ed. Atheneu, 1997 ) ISBN 85-7379-014-8
- FISIOPATOLOGIA CLÍNICA PATHOPHYSIOLOGY CLINICAL, FERNANDO BEVILACQUA & EDDY BENSOUSSAN & JOSÉ MANOEL JANSEN & FERNANDO SPÍNOLA E CASTRO FERNANDO BEVILACQUA, ISBN 85-7379-039-3
- MANUAL DE HIGIENE, SEGURANÇA E MEDICINA DO TRABALHO, EDDY BENSOUSSAN & SÉRGIO ALBIERI, DADOS DA EDIÇÂO, ISBN 85-7379-014-8
