= Naguila =

Algerian musical group

Naguila are a France-based Algerian and Moroccan ensemble for early music. The group was founded by Pierre-Luc Ben Soussan in 1998.

== Discography ==
- Chants mystiques séfarades, cantor André Taïeb. Instrumentalist: Kamal Berrada (oud, ney); Mohamed Zeftari (violin), Pierre-Luc Ben Soussan (riqq, darabuka), L'empreinte digitale, 1999.
- Hallel, Sephardic songs
- Hayam Hagadol, 2006

Also

- Chants séfarades des Synagogues du Languedoc. André Taïeb, CLRMDT/Abeille Musique, 2003.
