= Harry Becker (artist) =

English artist (1865–1928)

Harry Becker (1865–1928) was an English painter, draughtsman and printmaker from East Anglia.

== Biography ==
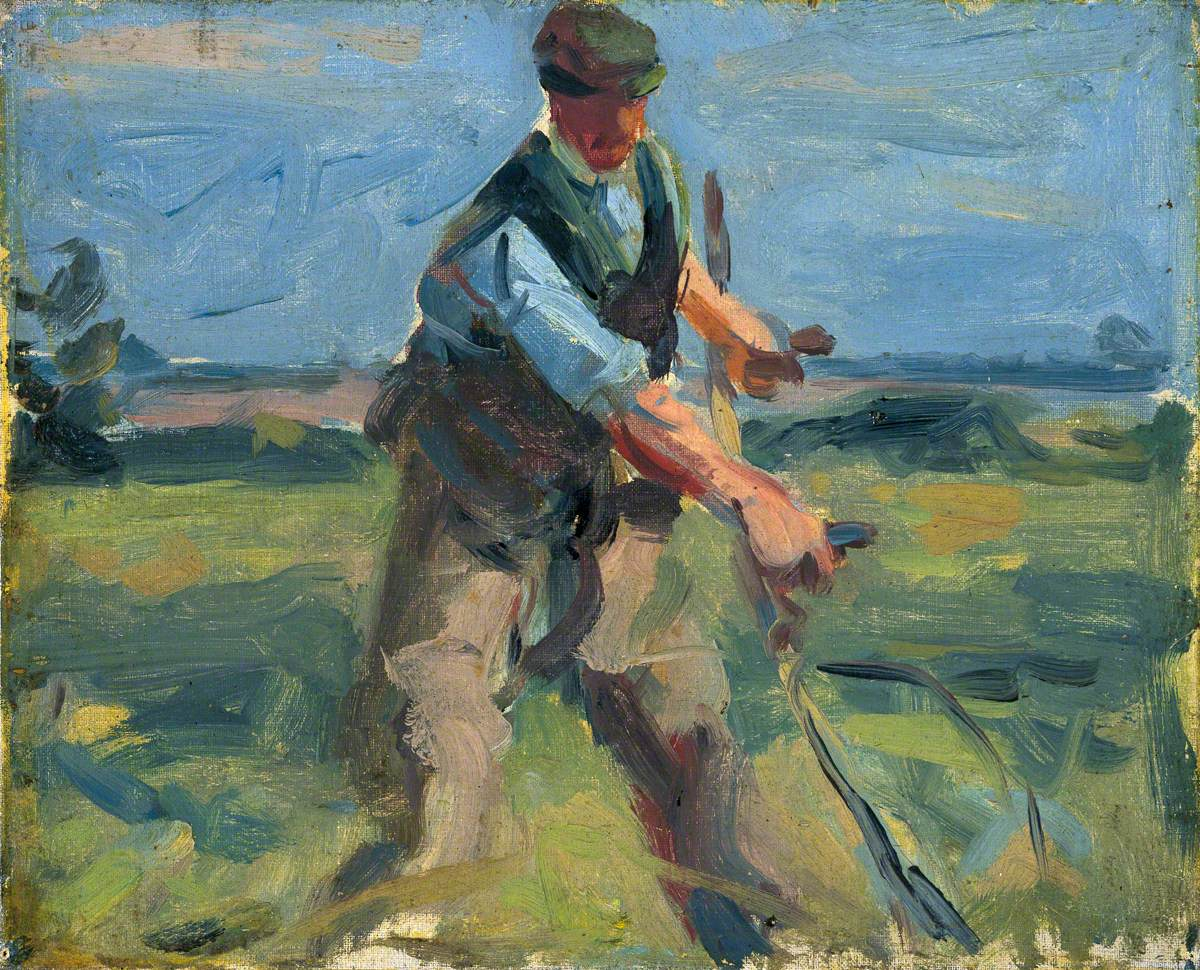
A Man with a Scythe, Mowing

Harry Becker was born in Colchester, Essex in 1865. He studied at the Antwerp Academy in Belgium, and in the atelier of Carolus-Duran in Paris. He first went to London in 1913. He then moved to Wenhaston and Darsham.

He illustrated Adrian Bell's Suffolk trilogy (Corduroy, Silver Ley, and The Cherry Tree).

His daughter Margaret Janet Becker wrote the History of Blythburgh and also regarding Wenhaston Church.
