= John Bensusan-Butt =

English landscape painter (1911–1997)

- Born: John Gordon Bensusan-Butt; June 6, 1911
- Died: August 22, 1997 (aged 86); Colchester, Essex, England
- Education: Gresham's School; Magdalen College, Oxford; Royal College of Art; Central School of Art and Crafts
- Known for: Landscape painting; Writing
- Parents: Geoffrey C. Bensusan-Butt; Ruth Bensusan-Butt

John Gordon Bensusan-Butt (6 June 1911 – 22 August 1997) was an English landscape painter and author.

The son of Geoffrey C. Butt (later Bensusan-Butt) and his wife Ruth Bensusan, a physician, he was educated at Gresham's School, Magdalen College, Oxford, the Royal College of Art, and the Central School of Art and Crafts.

His aunt Esther Bensusan was the wife of Lucien Pissarro, son of Camille Pissarro, and Bensusan-Butt grew up with their work around him, at the Minories, Colchester, now a museum and art gallery. From 1935, Lucien Pissarro became his adviser and artistic mentor, and the two men worked together at Cotignac and at the Minories, where Pissarro often stayed. Bensusan-Butt exhibited at the Royal Academy and was the art critic of the Essex County Standard from 1950 to 1966.

He died in August 1997, while still living in Colchester.

== Selected publications ==
- John Bensusan-Butt, Lucien Pissarro 1863-1944 (London: Anthony d’Offey, 1963)
- John Bensusan-Butt, The House That Boggis Built: a Social History of the Minories, Colchester (Victor Butte-Lay Trust, 1972)
- John Bensusan-Butt, The Eragny Press 1894–1914 (Colchester, 1973)
- John Bensusan-Butt, Recollections of Lucien Pissarro in his seventies (London: 1977)
- John Bensusan-Butt, On Naturalness in Art (1981) ISBN 978-0950746401
- John Bensusan-Butt, Colchester People: the John Bensusan Butt biographical dictionary of eighteenth-century Colchester
