= List of Protestant martyrs of the English Reformation =

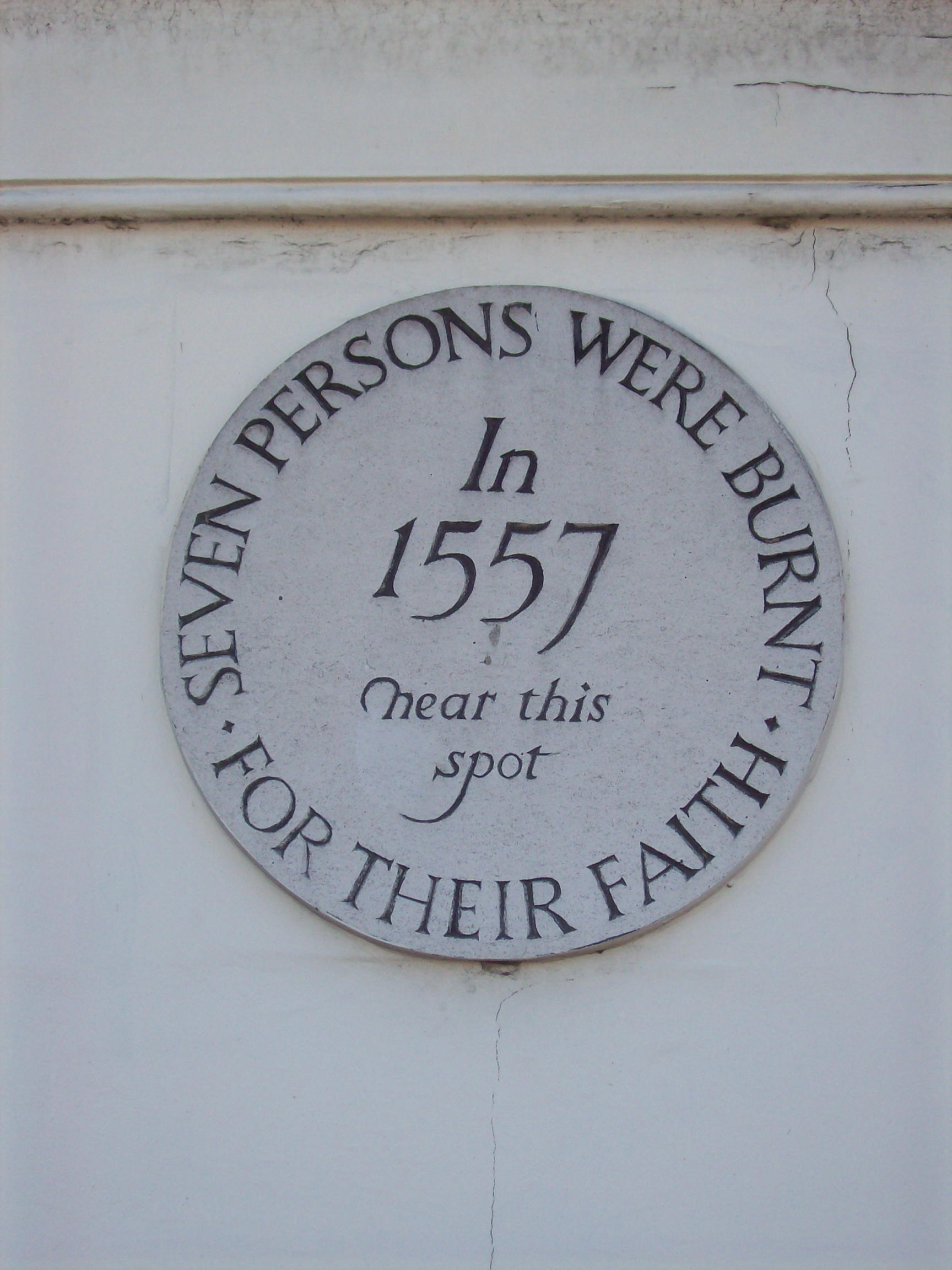
Plaque in Maidstone, Kent, commemorating those burnt nearby

Protestants were executed in England under heresy laws during the reigns of Henry VIII (1509–1547) and Mary I (1553–1558), and in smaller numbers during the reigns of Edward VI (1547–1553), Elizabeth I (1558–1603), and James I (1603–1625). Most were executed in the short reign of Mary I in what is called the Marian persecutions. Protestant theologian and activist John Foxe described "the great persecutions & horrible troubles, the suffering of martyrs, and other such things" in his contemporaneously-published Book of Martyrs.

Protestants in England and Wales were executed under legislation that punished anyone judged guilty of heresy against Catholicism. Although the standard penalty for those convicted of treason in England at the time was execution by being hanged, drawn and quartered, this legislation adopted the punishment of burning the condemned. At least 280 people were recognized as burned over the five years of Mary I's reign by contemporary sources.

== Historical context ==
=== English Reformation ===
The English Reformation had put a stop to Catholic ecclesiastical governance in England, asserted royal supremacy over the English Church and dissolved some church institutions, such as monasteries and chantries.

An important year in the English Reformation was 1547, when Protestantism became a new force under the child-king Edward VI, England's first Protestant ruler. Edward died at age 15 in 1553. His cousin and chosen Protestant successor Lady Jane Grey claimed the throne but was deposed by Edward's Catholic half-sister, Mary I.

=== Persecution of Protestants under Mary I (1553–1558) ===
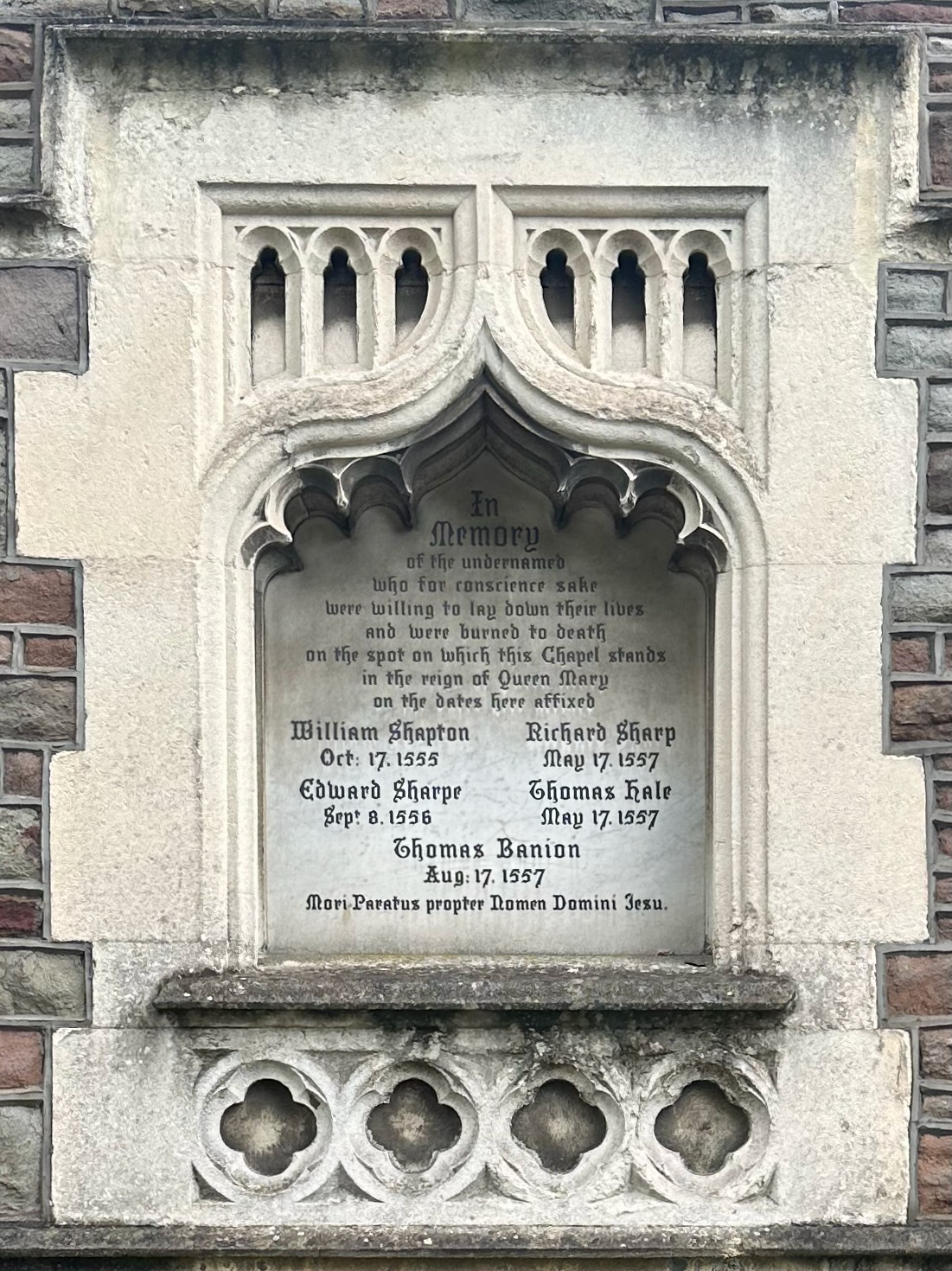
Marian martyrs memorial: Cotham Church, Bristol

The relationship between the English church and Rome was restored at the accession of Queen Mary I to the English throne in 1553. With her repeal of all religious legislation passed under Edward VI, Protestants faced a choice: exile, reconciliation/conversion, or punishment. Many people were exiled, and hundreds of dissenters were burned at the stake, earning her the nickname of "Bloody Mary". The number of people executed for their faith during the persecutions is thought to be at least 287, including 56 women. Thirty others died in prison.

Although the Marian Persecutions began with four clergymen, relics of Edwardian England's Protestantism, Foxe's Book of Martyrs offers an account of the executions, which extended well beyond the anticipated targets – high-level clergy. Tradesmen were also burned, as well as married men and women, sometimes in unison, "youths" and at least one couple was burned alive with their daughter. The figure of 300 victims of the Marian Persecutions was given by Foxe and later by Thomas Brice in his poem, "The Register".

=== English Inquisition and the judicial process ===
However bloody the end, the trials of Protestant heretics were judicial affairs, presided by bishops (most notably Bishop Bonner) adhering to a strict legal protocol under the privy council, with Parliament's blessing. Mary had difficulty forming an efficient Privy Council, which eventually numbered over 40 and never worked as a source of political advice, though it effectively pursued police work and enforcement of religious uniformity. During the session that restored the realm to papal obedience Parliament reinstated the heresy laws. From 20 January 1555, England could legally punish those judged guilty of heresy against the Roman Catholic faith.

Thus it became a matter of establishing the guilt or innocence of an accused heretic in open court – a process which the lay authorities employed to reclaim "straying sheep" and to set a precedent for authentic Catholic teaching. If found guilty, the accused were first excommunicated, then handed over to the secular authorities for execution. The official records of the trials are limited to formal accusations, sentences, and so forth; the documents to which historians look for context and detail are those written by the accused or their supporters.

=== John Rogers' execution ===
Before Mary's ascent to the throne, John Foxe, one of the few clerics of his day who was against the burning of even obstinate heretics, had approached the Royal Chaplain and Protestant preacher, John Rogers to intervene on behalf of Joan Bocher, a female Anabaptist who was sentenced to death by burning in 1550. Rogers refused to help, as he supported the burning of heretics. Rogers claimed that the method of execution was "sufficiently mild" for a crime as grave as heresy. Later, after Mary I came to power and restored England to Catholicism, John Rogers spoke quite vehemently against the new order and was himself burnt as a heretic.

=== Legacy ===
Throughout the course of the persecutions, Foxe lists 312 individuals who were burnt or hanged for their faith, or died or sickened in prison. Three of these people are commemorated with a gothic memorial in Oxford, England, but there are many other memorials across England. They are known locally as the "Marian Martyrs".

English saints and martyrs of the Reformation era are remembered in the Church of England with a Lesser Festival on 4 May.

== Martyrs executed ==
Order of death.	Name	Residence	Description	Date of execution	Place of execution	References
Protestants executed under Henry VIII
	Agnes Grebill	Kent, England	Lollard	burnt 1511	Kent	
1.	Thomas Hitton	Martham, Norfolk	clergyman – priest	burnt 23 February 1530	Maidstone, Kent	
2.	Thomas Benet	Exeter, Devon	teacher	burnt 15 January 1531	Exeter, Devon	
3.	Thomas Bilney	Taken at Norwich, Norfolk	clergyman – priest	burnt 19 August 1531	Lollards Pit, Norwich, Norfolk	
4.	Richard Bayfield	Taken at Mark Lane, London	monk – Benedictine (former) and chamberlain of Bury St Edmunds Abbey	burnt 27 November 1531	Smithfield, London	
5.	John Tewkesbury	St Michael-le-Querne Parish, Paternoster Row, London	leatherseller	burnt December 1531	Smithfield, London	
6.	'An old man'	Buckinghamshire		burnt 1531		(Note: 'Foxe has a terse report in the Rerum of an old man of Buckingham- shire being executed in 1531 for eating pork during Lent (Rerum, p. 126). Foxe's source for this episode is unknown; Bale does not mention this old man in any of his works. Perhaps Laurence Humphrey, who was Foxe's friend, a native of Buckinghamshire, and who was with Foxe in Basel, was the source for this story. In any case, the Rerum account was translated word-for-word in the 1563 edition. The story was dropped from all subsequent editions, possibly because Foxe grew unsure of this individual's existence or at least of his ability to prove it.' Foxe's Book of Martyrs, Critical Apparatus)
7.	Davy Foster	Yorkshire	poor artificer	burnt 1531		
8.	James Bainham	Middle Temple, London	lawyer	burnt 30 April 1532	Smithfield, London	
9.	John Bent	Urchfont, Wiltshire		burnt in or before April 1532	Devizes, Wiltshire	
10.	... Trapnel			burnt in or before April 1532	Bradford, Wiltshire	
11.	Thomas Harding	Chesham, Buckinghamshire	'aged father'	his brains were dashed out with a billet of wood while he was being burnt at the stake, May 1532	Chesham, Buckinghamshire	
12.	John Frith	Westerham, then Sevenoaks, Kent – Taken after he had been preaching at Bow Lane, London	clergyman – canon at Cardinal College, Oxford	burnt 4 July 1533	Smithfield, London	
13.	Andrew Hewet	Watling Street, London (born in Faversham, Kent)	apprentice to a tailor	burnt 4 July 1533	Smithfield, London	
14.–23.	Ten Dutchmen counted for Anabaptists – Segor, Derycke, Symon, Runa, Derycke, Dominicke, Dauid, Cornelius, Elken and Milo			burnt 1535	'sundry places of the realm'	
24.	Robert Pakington	Cheapside, London	mercer	murdered 13 November 1536	Cheapside, London	
25.	William Cowbridge	Wantage, Berkshire	clergyman (purported) – 'exercised the office of a priest, in teaching and administering of the sacraments, but being no priest indeed'	burnt after – probably shortly after – 22 July 1538	Oxford, Oxfordshire	(Note: Foxe describes him as being 'mad and beside his right senses ... and destitute of sense and reason'. The Critical Apparatus to Foxe's Book of Martyrs lists a number of unorthodox beliefs which he held.)
26.	John Lambert	The Stocks – a market for meat and fish in the City of London	clergyman – priest, and teacher of Greek and Latin	burnt 22 November 1538	Smithfield, London	
27.	... Puttedew	Suffolk		burnt in or before 1538	Suffolk	
28.	William Leiton or Leyton	Eye Priory, Eye, Suffolk	monk – Benedictine	burnt in or before 1538	Norwich, Norfolk	
29. -30	Two Anabaptists, a man and a woman	Dutch		burnt 29 November 1538	Smithfield, London	
31.	Giles Germane			burnt 1539	St Giles in the Fields, outside London	
32.	Launcelot ...		servant of the king	burnt 1539	St Giles in the Fields, outside London	
33.	John ...		painter	burnt 1539	St Giles in the Fields, outside London	
34.–36.	Three Anabaptists – ... Mandeville, ... Collins and another			burnt 29 April 1539	Newington Causeway, outside London	
37.	William Collins	London	lawyer and gentleman	burnt 7 July 1540	Smithfield, London or Southwark	(Note: Foxe describes him as being 'mad ... ravished of his wits ... beside his wits'.)
38.	Robert Barnes	Austin Friary, Cambridge (until 1528)	monk – Augustinian	burnt 30 July 1540	Smithfield, London	
39.	Thomas Gerrard (or Gerard, Garret or Garrard)	All Hallows Honey Lane Parish, London	clergyman – rector of All Hallows Honey Lane	burnt 30 July 1540	Smithfield, London	
40.	William Jerome	Stepney, London	clergyman – vicar of St Dunstan's, Stepney	burnt 30 July 1540	Smithfield, London	
41.–42.	Valentine Freese and his wife			burnt 1540	York, Yorkshire	
43.	Richard Mekins		'a child that passed not the age of fifteen years'	burnt 30 July 1541		
44.	Richard Spenser		clergyman (former) – 'a ... Priest ... who leaving his papistry, had married a wife, and became a player in interludes'	Burnt about 1541/2	Salisbury, Wiltshire	
45.	John Ramsey		player in interludes	Burnt about 1541/2	Salisbury, Wiltshire	
46.	Thomas Bernard			burnt about 1541	Lincoln Diocese	
47.	James Morton			burnt about 1541	Lincoln Diocese	
48.	Adam Damlip (also known as George Bucker)	Calais	clergyman – former chaplain to Bishop John Fisher	hanged, drawn and quartered 22 May 1543	Calais	
	Windsor Martyrs					
49.	Robert Testwood	City of London (originally)	musician in the college at Windsor	burnt 28 July 1543	Windsor, Berkshire	
50.	Anthony Pearson		clergyman – priest of Windsor; popular preacher	burnt 28 July 1543	Windsor, Berkshire	
51.	Henry Filmer		churchwarden of St John the Baptist Church, Windsor	burnt 28 July 1543	Windsor, Berkshire	
52.	Unknown man	Calais	poor labouring man	burnt 1540 (Note: Six months before the execution of Robert Harvey for treason in Spring 1541 Harvey#C241.56 Foxe's Book of Martyrs, Critical Apparatus)	Calais	
53.	... Dodd	Calais – a Scotsman		burnt 1541 (Note: 'within the space of a year, or thereabout, after' the previous man)	Calais	
54.	[Forename unknown] ... Henry			burnt 1545 or 1546	Colchester, Essex	
55.	Unknown man		servant of ... Henry	burnt 1545 or 1546	Colchester, Essex	
56.	[Forename unknown] ... Kerby			burnt 1546	Ipswich, Suffolk	
57.	Roger Clarke	Mendlesham, Suffolk		burnt 1546	Bury St Edmunds, Suffolk	
58.	Anne Askew	Stallingborough, Lincolnshire	wife of Master Thomas Kyme, a farmer and landowner of Friskney, Lincolnshire	burnt 16 July 1546	Smithfield, London	
59.	Nicholas Belenian	Shropshire	clergyman – priest	burnt 16 July 1546	Smithfield, London	
60.	John Adams	Colchester, Essex	tailor	burnt 16 July 1546	Smithfield, London	
61.	John Lassells	Gateford, Nottinghamshire	courtier	burnt 16 July 1546	Smithfield, London	
62.	... Rogers	Norfolk		burnt 1546	Norfolk	
63.	Oliver Richardine	Whitchurch parish, Shropshire		burnt 1546	Hartford West	
Radical Protestants executed under Edward VI
1.	Joan Bocher (or Butcher, or as Joan Knell)	Kent (perhaps Romney Marsh)		2 May 1550	Smithfield, London	
2.	George van Parris	Dutchman		1551		
Protestants executed under Mary I
1.	John Rogers	City of London	clergyman – preacher, biblical translator, lecturer at St. Paul's Cathedral	burnt 4 February 1555	Smithfield, London	
2.	Lawrence Saunders	City of London	clergyman – preacher, Rector of All Hallows Bread Street, London	burnt 8 February 1555	Coventry, Warwickshire	
3.	John Hooper	Gloucester and Worcester	clergyman – Bishop of Gloucester and Worcester under Edward VI	burnt 9 February 1555	Gloucester, Gloucestershire	
4.	Rowland Taylor	Hadleigh, Suffolk	clergyman – Rector of Hadleigh, Suffolk	burnt 9 February 1555	Aldham Common, Nr Hadleigh, Suffolk	
5.	Rawlins White	Cardiff, Glamorgan	fisherman	burnt March 1555	Cardiff, Glamorgan	
6.	Thomas Tomkins	Shoreditch, London	weaver	burnt 16 March 1555	Smithfield, London	
7.	Thomas Causton	Horndon on the Hill or Thundersby, Essex	gentleman	burnt 26 March 1555	Rayleigh, Essex	
8.	Thomas Higbed	Horndon on the Hill or Thundersby, Essex	gentleman	burnt 26 March 1555	Horndon-on-the-Hill, Essex	
9.	William Hunter	Coleman Street Parish, London	apprentice	burnt 27 March 1555 (or 26 according to Foxe)	Brentwood, Essex	
10.	Stephen Knight		barber	burnt 28 March 1555	Maldon, Essex	
11.	William Pygot (or Pigot)		butcher	burnt 28 March 1555	Braintree, Essex	
12. (Note: The 1563 edition of Foxe's Book of Martyrs records that William Dighel was burned at about the same time as Nicholas Sheterden. However, this information is not repeated in subsequent editions of Foxe's work. "Was his omission in subsequent editions due to an accident in the print shop or did Foxe come to doubt his information on Dighel?")	William Dighel			burnt 28 March 1555	Banbury, Oxfordshire	
13.	John Lawrence (or Laurence)		clergyman – priest and former Blackfriar at Sudbury, Suffolk	burnt 29 March 1555	Colchester, Essex	
14.	Robert Ferrar	St David's, Pembrokeshire	clergyman – Bishop of St David's under Edward VI	burnt 30 March 1555	Carmarthen, Carmarthenshire	
15.	George Marsh	Dean, Lancashire	clergyman – curate to Laurence Saunders and minister at Dean, Lancashire	burnt 24 April 1555	Boughton, Cheshire	
16.	William Flower	Lambeth, London	surgeon and teacher	burnt 24 April 1555	Westminster	
17.	John Cardmaker	Wells, Somerset	clergyman – prebendary of Wells Cathedral	burnt 30 May 1555	Smithfield, London	
18.	John Warne (Note: husband of Elizabeth Warne, burnt in August 1555)	Walbrook, London	upholsterer	burnt 30 May 1555	Smithfield, London	
19.	Thomas Hawkes (or Haukes)	Essex	gentleman	burnt 10 June 1555	Coggeshall, Essex	
20.	Thomas Watts (or Wattes)	Billericay, Essex	linen draper	burnt 10 June 1555	Chelmsford, Essex	
21.	John Ardeley (or Ardite)	Wigborough, Essex	husbandman	burnt 30 May 1555 (or 'about 10 June', according to Foxe)	Rayleigh, Essex	
22.	John Simson	Wigborough, Essex	husbandman	burnt 30 May 1555 (or 'about 10 June', according to Foxe)	Rochford, Essex	
23.	Nicholas Chamberlain (or Chamberlaine)	Coggeshall, Essex	weaver	burnt 14 June 1555	Colchester, Essex	
24.	William Bamford (or Butler) (Note: May be the same as ... Butter, burnt (day unknown) June 1555, Location unknown (the Regester))	Coggeshall, Essex	weaver	burnt 15 June 1555	Harwich, Essex	
25.	Thomas Ormond (or Osmande) (Note: Buried in St. Michaels & All Angels Marble placed in 1748)	Coggeshall, Essex	fuller	burnt 15 June 1555	Manningtree, Essex	
26.	John Bradford	City of London	clergyman – prebendary of St Paul's Cathedral	burnt 1 July 1555	Smithfield, London	
27.	John Leaf (or Jhon Least)	Christ Church Greyfriars, London (born in Kirkby Moorside, Yorkshire)	apprentice tallow chandler	burnt 1 July 1555	Smithfield, London	
	Canterbury Martyrs of July 1555					
28.	John Bland (or Blande)	Rolvenden, Kent	clergyman – vicar of Rolvenden, Kent	burnt 12 July 1555	Canterbury, Kent	
29.	Nicholas Shetterden (or Shitterdun)			burnt 12 July 1555	Canterbury, Kent	
30.	John Frankesh	Adisham, Kent	clergyman – parson of Adisham, Kent	burnt 12 July 1555	Canterbury, Kent	(Note: which calls him 'Sir Franke')
31.	Humphrey Middleton	Ashford, Kent		burnt 12 July 1555	Canterbury, Kent	
32.	Nicholas Hall	Dartford, Kent	bricklayer	burnt 19 July 1555	Rochester, Kent	
33.	Christopher Wade	Dartford, Kent	linen-weaver	burnt July 1555	Dartford, Kent	
34.	Margaret (or Margery) Polley (Note: The same as Jone Polley, burnt (day unknown) July 1555, Location unknown (the Regester))	Pepeling, Calais (Note: Foxe erred in stating that Polley came from Pepenbury; see PRO C/85/144/33r.)	widow	burnt 17 July 1555	Royal Tunbridge Wells, Kent	
35.	Dirick Carver (also spelt Deryk; also known as Dirick Harman)	Brighthelmstone (now Brighton), Sussex	beer-brewer	burnt 22 July 1555,	Lewes, East Sussex	
36.	John Launder	Godstone, Surrey	husbandman	burnt 23 July 1555	Steyning, West Sussex	
37.	Thomas Euerson (or Iueson, Iverson or Iveson)	Godstone, Surrey	carpenter	burnt (day unknown) July 1555	Chichester, West Sussex	
38.	Richard Hook (or Hooke)		lame man	burnt (day unknown) July 1555	Chichester, West Sussex	
39.	James Abbess	Stoke-by-Nayland, Suffolk	shoemaker	burnt 2 August 1555	Thetford, Norfolk (or Bury, according to Foxe)	
40.	John Denley	Maidstone, Kent	gentleman	burnt 8 August 1555	Uxbridge, Middlesex	
41.	Robert Smith	Windsor, Berkshire	clerk at the college in Windsor, Berkshire and painter	burnt 8 August 1555	Uxbridge, Middlesex	
	Canterbury Martyrs of August 1555					
42.	William Coker			burnt 23 August 1555	Canterbury, Kent	
43.	William Hopper	Cranbrook, Kent		burnt 23 August 1555	Canterbury, Kent	
44.	Henry Laurence			burnt 23 August 1555	Canterbury, Kent	
45.	Richard Collier (or Colliar)			burnt 23 August 1555	Canterbury, Kent	
46.	Richard Wright	Ashford, Kent		burnt 23 August 1555	Canterbury, Kent	
47.	William Stere	Ashford, Kent		burnt 23 August 1555	Canterbury, Kent	
48.	Elizabeth Warne (or Warren) (Note: widow of John Warne, burnt in May 1555)	Walbrook, London	widow of John Warne, upholsterer	burnt 23 August 1555	Stratford-atte-Bow, London	
49.	Roger Hues (aliases: Curryer, Corier)	St Mary's, Taunton, Somerset		burnt 24 August 1555	Taunton, Somerset	
50.	George Tankerfield	London (born in York)	cook	burnt 26 August 1555	St Albans	
51.	Patrick Pakingham (aliases: Packingham, Pachingham, Patchingham or Pattenham)			burnt 28 August 1555	Uxbridge, Middlesex	
52.	John Newman	Maidstone, Kent	pewterer	burnt 31 August 1555	Saffron Walden, Essex	
53.	Robert Samuel (or Samuell)	Barfold, Suffolk	clergyman – minister at Barfold, Suffolk	burnt 31 August 1555	Thetford, Norfolk	
54.	Stephen Harwood	Ware, Hertfordshire	brewer	burnt 30 August 1555	Stratford in Essex	
55.	Thomas Fust (or Fusse)		hosier,	August 1555	In the environs of London or Ware	
56.	William Hale (or Hailes)	Thorpe, Essex,		late August 1555	In the environs of Barnet, London	
57.	William Allen	Somerton, Norfolk	labourer	burnt early September 1555	Walsingham, Norfolk	
58.	Roger Coe (or Coo or Cooe)	Melford, Suffolk	shearman	burnt date unknown September 1555	Yoxford, Suffolk	
59.	Thomas Cob	Haverhill, Suffolk	butcher	burnt date unknown September 1555	Thetford, Norfolk	
	Canterbury Martyrs of September 1555					
60.	George Catmer (or Painter)	Hythe, Kent		burnt about 6 September 1555, according to Foxe (or 12 July 1555)	Canterbury, Kent	
61.	Robert Streater (or Streter)	Hythe, Kent		burnt about 6 September 1555, according to Foxe (or 12 July 1555)	Canterbury, Kent	
62.	Anthony Burward	Calete (possibly Calais)		burnt about 6 September 1555, according to Foxe (or 12 July 1555)	Canterbury, Kent	
63.	George Brodbridge (or Bradbridge)	Bromfield, Kent		burnt about 6 September 1555, according to Foxe (or 12 July 1555)	Canterbury, Kent	
64.	James Tutty (or Tuttey)	Brenchley, Kent		burnt about 6 September 1555, according to Foxe (or 12 July 1555)	Canterbury, Kent	
65.	Robert Glover (or Glouer)	Mancetter, Warwickshire	gentleman	burnt 14 September 1555	Coventry, Warwickshire	
66.	Cornelius Bongey (or Bungey)		capper	burnt 20 September 1555	Coventry, Warwickshire	
67.	Thomas Hayward (or Heywarde)			burnt mid-September 1555	Lichfield, Staffordshire	
68.	John Goreway	Holy Trinity Parish, Coventry, Warwickshire		burnt mid-September 1555	Lichfield, Staffordshire	
	Ely Martyrs					
69.	William Wolsey	Upwell, Norfolk	constable, one of the Ely Martyrs	burnt 16 October 1555	Cathedral Green, Ely, Cambridgeshire	
70.	Robert Pygot (or Pigot)	Wisbech, Isle of Ely, Cambridgeshire	painter, also an Ely Martyr	burnt 16 October 1555	Cathedral Green, Ely, Cambridgeshire	
	Oxford Martyrs					
71.	Hugh Latimer (or Latymer)	Baxterley, Warwickshire	clergyman – chaplain to King Edward VI	burnt 16 October 1555	outside Balliol College, Oxford	
72.	Nicholas Ridley	Fulham Palace	clergyman – Bishop of London under Edward VI	burnt 16 October 1555	outside Balliol College, Oxford	
	Canterbury Martyrs of November 1555					
73.	John Webbe (or Web)		gentleman	burnt 30 November 1555	Canterbury, Kent	
74.	George Roper			burnt 30 November 1555	Canterbury, Kent	
75.	Gregory Parke (or Paynter)			burnt 30 November 1555	Canterbury, Kent	
76.	John Philpot	Winchester, Hampshire	clergyman – Archdeacon of Winchester	burnt 18 December 1555	Smithfield, London	
77.	Thomas Whittle (or Whitwell)	Essex	clergyman – priest or minister	burnt 27 January 1556	Smithfield, London	
78.	Bartlett (or Bartholomew) Green	Temple, London – born in Basinghall, London	gentleman and lawyer	burnt 27 January 1556	Smithfield, London	
79.	Thomas Brown	St Bride's parish, Fleet Street, London – born in Histon, Cambridgeshire		burnt 27 January 1556	Smithfield, London	
80.	John Tudson	St Mary Botolph parish, London – born in Ipswich, Suffolk	artificer	burnt 27 January 1556	Smithfield, London	
81.	John Went (or Winter or Hunt)	Langham, Essex	artificer	burnt 27 January 1556	Smithfield, London	
82.	Isobella Forster (or Annis Foster)	St Bride's parish, Fleet Street, London – Born in Greystoke, Cumberland	wife of John Foster, cutler	burnt 27 January 1556	Smithfield, London	
83.	Joan Lushford (or Jone Lashforde, or Warne)	Little Allhallows parish, Thames Street, London	maid	burnt 27 January 1556	Smithfield, London	(Note: which says that 'Joan Lashford ... was the daughter of one Robert Lashford ..., and of ... Elizabeth, who afterward was married to John Warne')
	Canterbury Martyrs of 1556					
84.	John Lomas (or Jhon Lowmas)	Tenterden, Kent		burnt 31 January 1556	Wincheap, Canterbury	
85.	Annes Snoth (or Annis Snod)	Smarden, Kent	widow	burnt 31 January 1556	Wincheap, Canterbury	
86.	Anne Wright (or Albright); alias Champnes			burnt 31 January 1556	Wincheap, Canterbury	
87.	Joan (or Jone) Soale	Horton, Kent	wife	burnt 31 January 1556	Wincheap, Canterbury	
88.	Joan Catmer	Hythe, Kent	'wife (as it should seem) of George Catmer', burnt in 1555	burnt 31 January 1556	Wincheap, Canterbury	(Note: may be the same as Jone Painter (the Regester))
	Ipswich Martyrs of 1556					
89.	Agnes Potten	Ipswich, Suffolk	wife of Robert Potten	burnt 19 February 1556	Ipswich, Cornhill	(Note: which refers to 'two women in Ippeswiche towne')
90.	Joan Trunchfield	Ipswich, Suffolk	wife of Michael Trunchfield, a shoemaker	burnt 19 February 1556	Ipswich, Cornhill	
91.	Thomas Cranmer	Lambeth Palace	clergyman – Archbishop of Canterbury (former)	burnt 21 March 1556	outside Balliol College, Oxford	
92.	John Maundrel	Beckhampton, Wiltshire – brought up in Rowde, Wiltshire	husbandman	burnt 24 March 1556	outside Salisbury, Wiltshire	(Note: which refers to 'two brethren more')
93.	William Coberly	Wiltshire	tailor	burnt 24 March 1556	outside Salisbury, Wiltshire	
94.	John Spicer (or Spencer)	Winston, Suffolk	freemason or bricklayer	burnt 24 March 1556	outside Salisbury, Wiltshire	
95.	John Harpole (or Hartpoole)	St Nicholas Parish, Rochester, Kent		burnt 1 April 1556	Rochester, Kent	
96.	Joan Beach	Tunbridge Wells, Kent	widow	burnt 1 April 1556	Rochester, Kent	
97.	John Hullier (or Hulliarde)	Babraham, Cambridgeshire	clergyman – curate of Babraham, Cambridgeshire	burnt 16 April 1556	Cambridge, Cambridgeshire	
98.	William Tyms (or Timmes)	Hockley, Essex	clergyman – curate of Hockley, Essex	burnt 24 April 1556	Smithfield, London	
99.	Robert Drake	Thundersley, Essex	clergyman – minister or parson of Thundersley, Essex	burnt 24 April 1556	Smithfield, London	
100.	Richard Spurge	Bocking, Essex	shearman	burnt 24 April 1556	Smithfield, London	
101.	Thomas Spurge	Bocking, Essex	fuller	burnt 24 April 1556	Smithfield, London	
102.	George Ambrose	Bocking, Essex	fuller	burnt 24 April 1556	Smithfield, London	
103.	John Cavel (or Cauell)	Bocking, Essex	weaver	burnt 24 April 1556	Smithfield, London	
	Colchester martyrs of April 1556					
104.	Christopher Lister	Dagenham, Essex	husbandman	burnt 28 April 1556	Colchester, Essex	
105.	John Mace	Colchester, Essex	apothecary	burnt 28 April 1556	Colchester, Essex	
106.	John Spencer	Colchester, Essex	weaver	burnt 28 April 1556	Colchester, Essex	
107.	Simon Joyne		sawyer	burnt 28 April 1556	Colchester, Essex	
108.	Richard Nicol	Colchester, Essex	weaver	burnt 28 April 1556	Colchester, Essex	
109.	John Hamond	Colchester, Essex	tanner	burnt 28 April 1556	Colchester, Essex	
110.	Hugh Laverock (or Lauarocke)	Barking, Essex	painter, (a lame man)	burnt 15 May 1556	Stratford in Essex	
111.	John Apprice (or Aprice)		blind man	burnt 15 May 1556	Stratford-Atte-Bow or Stratford in Essex	
112.	Thomas Drowry		blind boy	burnt 15 May 1556	Gloucester, Gloucestershire	(Note: which refers to 'two at Glocester')
113.	Thomas Croker		bricklayer	burnt 15 May 1556	Gloucester, Gloucestershire	(Note: which refers to 'two at Glocester')
114.	Katherine Hut	Bocking, Essex	widow	burnt 16 May 1556	Smithfield, London	
115.	Elizabeth Thackvel	Great Burstead, Essex	maid	burnt 16 May 1556	Smithfield, London	
116.	Joan (or Jone) Horns	Billericay, Essex	maid	burnt 16 May 1556	Smithfield, London	
117.	Thomas Spicer	Winston, Suffolk	labourer	burnt 21 May 1556	Beccles, Suffolk	(Note: which refers to 'two men and a syster dere')
118.	John Deny (or Denny) (possibly a female Joan or Jone)	Beccles, Suffolk		burnt 21 May 1556	Beccles, Suffolk	(Note: which refers to 'two men and a syster dere')
119.	Edmund Poole	Beccles, Suffolk		burnt 21 May 1556	Beccles, Suffolk	(Note: which refers to 'two men and a syster dere')
120.	Thomas Harland	Woodmancote, Sussex	carpenter	burnt 6 June 1556	Lewes, Sussex	
121.	John Oswald (or Oseward)	Woodmancote, Sussex	husbandman	burnt 6 June 1556	Lewes, Sussex	
122.	Thomas Reed	Ardingly, Sussex		burnt about 6 June 1556	Lewes, Sussex	
123. (Note: 'The Regester' states that a person called 'Milwright' was burnt along with Harland, Oswald, Reed and Avington. However, this person is not mentioned in Foxe's Book of Martyrs, although he does appear in)	Thomas Avington (or Euington)	Ardingly, Sussex	turner	burnt about 6 June 1556	Lewes, Sussex	
124.	Adam Forster (or Foster)	Mendlesham, Suffolk	husbandman	burnt 17 June 1556	Bury St Edmunds, Suffolk	
125.	Robert Lawson	Mendlesham, Suffolk	linen weaver	burnt 17 June 1556	Bury St Edmunds, Suffolk	
126.	Thomas Wood		clergyman – pastor	burnt about 20 June 1556	Lewes, Sussex	
127.	Thomas Milles	Hellingly, Sussex		burnt about 20 June 1556	Lewes, Sussex	(Note: may be the same as John Milles)
128.	Thomas Moor		servant and husbandman	burnt 26 June 1556	Leicester, Leicestershire	(Note: the same as 'A merchant's servant burned at Leicester' and the same as 'the yong man at Leicester')
	Stratford Martyrs, 11 men and 2 women.					
129.	Henry Adlington (or Addlinton)	Grinstead, Sussex	sawyer	burnt 27 June 1556	Stratford-Atte-Bow	
130.	Lawrence (or Laurence) Parnam	Hoddesdon, Hertfordshire	smith	burnt 27 June 1556	Stratford-Atte-Bow	
131.	Henry Wye	Stanford-le-Hope, Essex	brewer	burnt 27 June 1556	Stratford-Atte-Bow	
132.	William Holywell (or Hallywell)	Waltham Holy Cross, Essex,	smith	burnt 27 June 1556	Stratford-Atte-Bow	
133.	Thomas Bowyer (or Bowier)	Great Dunmow, Essex	weaver	burnt 27 June 1556	Stratford-Atte-Bow	
134.	George Searle	White Notley, Essex	tailor	burnt 27 June 1556	Stratford-Atte-Bow	
135.	Edmond Hurst	St James's Parish, Colchester	labourer	burnt 27 June 1556	Stratford-Atte-Bow	
136.	Lion/Lyon Cawch	City of London	merchant/broker	burnt 27 June 1556	Stratford-Atte-Bow	
137.	Ralph Jackson	Chipping Ongar, Essex,	serving-man	burnt 27 June 1556	Stratford-Atte-Bow	
138.	John Derifall (or Dorifall)	Rettendon, Essex	labourer	burnt 27 June 1556	Stratford-Atte-Bow	
139.	John Routh/Roth	Wickes, Essex	labourer	burnt 27 June 1556	Stratford-Atte-Bow	
140.	Elizabeth Pepper	St James's parish, Colchester	wife of Thomas Pepper, weaver	burnt 27 June 1556	Stratford-Atte-Bow	(Note: which refers to "two women")
141.	Agnes George	West Barefold, Essex	wife of Richard George, husbandman	burnt 27 June 1556	Stratford-Atte-Bow	(Note: her husband then married Christian George, mentioned below)
142.	Roger Bernard	Framsden, Suffolk	labourer	burnt 30 June 1556	Bury St Edmunds, Suffolk	
143.	Julins Palmer	Reading, Berkshire	schoolmaster	burnt about 15 July 1556	'The Sand-pits', Nr Newbury, Berkshire	
144.	John Guin/Jhon Gwin		shoemaker	burnt about 15 July 1556	'The Sand-pits', Nr Newbury, Berkshire	
145.	Thomas Askin/Askue			burnt about 15 July 1556	'The Sand-pits', Nr Newbury, Berkshire	
	Guernsey Martyrs – (Three women and one unborn male foetus)					
146.	Catherine Cauchés (sometimes spelt Katherine Cawches)	St Peter Port, Guernsey, Channel Islands		burnt 18 July 1556	St Peter Port, Guernsey, Channel Islands	
147.	Perotine Massey (pregnant)	St Peter Port, Guernsey, Channel Islands	wife of Norman Calvinist minister	burnt 18 July 1556	St Peter Port, Guernsey, Channel Islands	
148.	Guillemine Gilbert	St Peter Port, Guernsey, Channel Islands		burnt 18 July 1556	St Peter Port, Guernsey, Channel Islands	
149.	Thomas Dungate (or Dougate)	East Grinstead, Sussex		burnt 18 July 1556	Grinstead, Sussex	
150.	John Forman (or Foreman)	East Grinstead, Sussex		burnt 18 July 1556	Grinstead, Sussex	
151.	Anne Tree (or Try)	West Hoathly, Sussex		burnt 18 July 1556	Grinstead, Sussex	
152.	Joan Waste	All Hallows', Derby, Derbyshire	blind woman	burnt 1 August 1556	Derby, Derbyshire	
153.	Edward Sharp		glover (possibly)	burnt early September 1556	Bristol, Gloucestershire/Somerset	
154.	Rose Pencell			burnt 17 October 1555	Bristol	
155.	William Shapton		weaver	burnt 17 October 1555	Bristol	
156.	John Kurde	Syresham, Northamptonshire	shoemaker	burnt October 1556 or 20 September 1557	Northampton, Northamptonshire	
157.	John Noyes	Laxfield, Suffolk	shoemaker	burnt 22 September 1556 or 1557		
158.	Thomas Ravensdale			burnt 24 September 1556	Mayfield, Sussex	
159.	John Hart			burnt 24 September 1556	Mayfield, Sussex	
160.	Unknown man		shoemaker	burnt 24 September 1556	Mayfield, Sussex	
161.	Unknown man		currier	burnt 24 September 1556	Mayfield, Sussex	
162.	Nicholas Holden	Withyham, Sussex	weaver	burnt 24 September 1556	Mayfield, Sussex	
163.	Unknown man		carpenter	burnt 25 September 1556	Bristol, Gloucestershire/Somerset	
164.	John Horn			burnt late September 1556	Wotton-under-Edge, Gloucestershire	(Note: May be an error for Edward Horne, burnt at Newent, Gloucestershire in September 1558. Foxe states that a woman was burnt with Horne. However, the Critical Apparatus quotes a letter from Foxe's papers stating that 'Edward Horne's wife was condemned with him but she recanted and her life was spared')
165.	John Phillpott	Tenterden, Kent		burnt 16 January 1557	Wye, Ashford, Kent	(Note: which refers to 'two at Wye')
166.	Thomas Stephens	Biddenden, Kent		burnt 16 January 1557	Wye, Ashford, Kent	(Note: which refers to 'two at Wye')
	Canterbury Martyrs of January 1557					
167.	Stephen Kempe	Norgate, Kent		burnt 15 January 1557	Canterbury, Kent	
168.	William Waterer	Biddenden, Kent		burnt 15 January 1557	Canterbury, Kent	
169.	William Prowting	Thurnham, Kent		burnt 15 January 1557	Canterbury, Kent	
170.	William Lowick	Cranbrook, Kent		burnt 15 January 1557	Canterbury, Kent	
171.	Thomas Hudson	Selling, Kent		burnt 15 January 1557	Canterbury, Kent	
172.	William Hay	Hythe, Kent		burnt 15 January 1557	Canterbury, Kent	
173.	Nicholas Final	Tenterden, Kent		burnt 16 January 1557	Ashford, Kent	(Note: which refers to 'two at Asheforde'. A number of Kentish people of Ashford Area are recorded as having been burnt 16 January 1556 at Ashford, Kent in Ashford Borough Council – Parks and Open Spaces. However, at this time the civil or legal year in England began on 25 March, so the date now known as 16 January 1557 would then have been recorded as 16 January 1556.)
174.	Martin Bradbridge	Tenterden, Kent		burnt 16 January 1557	Ashford, Kent	
175.	William Carman (or Carmen) (Note: William Carman burnt unknown month 1557 and Thomas Carman burnt 19 May 1558 were brothers)			burnt day and month unknown 1557		
176.	Thomas Loseby			burnt 12 April 1557	Smithfield, London	(Note: may be the same as Jhon Lothesby, burnt at Smithfield, April 1557 (the Regester))
177.	Henry Ramsey			burnt 12 April 1557	Smithfield, London	
178.	Thomas Thyrtell (or Sturtle)			burnt 12 April 1557	Smithfield, London	
179.	Margaret Hyde			burnt 12 April 1557	Smithfield, London	(Note: may be the same as Annis Hide, burnt at Smithfield, April 1557 (the Regester))
180.	Agnes Stanley (or Stanlye)			burnt 12 April 1557	Smithfield, London	
181.	Richard Sharpe		weaver	burnt 7 May 1557	Cotham, Bristol	
182.	Thomas Hale		shoemaker	burnt 7 May 1557	Cotham, Bristol	
183.	Stephen Gratwick (or Steuen Grathwick)	Brighthelmstone (now Brighton), Sussex		burnt at end of May 1557	St. George's Fields, Southwark, Surrey	
184.	William Morant			burnt at end of May 1557	St. George's Fields, Southwark, Surrey	
185.	Thomas King			burnt at end of May 1557	St. George's Fields, Southwark, Surrey	(Note: which records an 'other' burnt with Morant and Grathwick)
	Maidstone martyrs					
186.	Joan (or Jone) Bradbridge	Staplehurst, Kent	Presumably a relative of Widow Bradbridge, burnt 19 June 1557	burnt 18 June 1557	Maidstone, Kent	
187.	Walter Appleby	Maidstone, Kent		burnt 18 June 1557	Maidstone, Kent	
188.	Petronil Appleby	Maidstone, Kent	wife of Walter Appleby	burnt 18 June 1557	Maidstone, Kent	
189.	Edmund Allin (or Allen)	Maplehurst Mill, Frittenden, Kent	miller	burnt 18 June 1557	Maidstone, Kent	
190.	Katherine Allin (or Allen)	Maplehurst Mill, Frittenden, Kent	Wife of Edmund Allin/Allen, miller	burnt 18 June 1557	Maidstone, Kent	
191.	Joan (or Jone) Manning	Maidstone, Kent		burnt 18 June 1557	Maidstone, Kent	
192.	Elizabeth (surname possibly 'Lewis')		blind maid	burnt 18 June 1557	Maidstone, Kent	
	Canterbury martyrs of June 1557					
193.	John Fishcock/Jhon Fiscoke			burnt 19 June 1557	Canterbury, Kent	
194.	Nicholas White			burnt 19 June 1557	Canterbury, Kent	
195.	Nicholas Pardue/Perdue			burnt 19 June 1557	Canterbury, Kent	
196.	Barbara Final			burnt 19 June 1557	Canterbury, Kent	
197.	Bradbridge's Widow (Bradbridge's Wife)	Probably Tenterden, Kent	Probably the widow of Martin Bradbridge, burnt 16 January 1557	burnt 19 June 1557	Canterbury, Kent	
198.	Mistress Wilson (also referred to as 'Wilson's Wife')			burnt 19 June 1557	Canterbury, Kent	
199.	Alice Benden, possibly also referred to as 'Benson's Wife'	Staplehurst (or possibly Cranbrook), Kent		burnt 19 June 1557	Canterbury, Kent	
	Lewes Martyrs					
200.	Richard Woodman	Warbleton, Sussex	iron-maker	burnt 22 June 1557	Lewes, Sussex	
201.	George Stevens (or Steuens)	Warbleton, Sussex		burnt 22 June 1557	Lewes, Sussex	
202.	William Mainard	Mayfield, Sussex		burnt 22 June 1557	Lewes, Sussex	
203.	Alexander Hosman	Mayfield, Sussex	servant of William Mainard	burnt 22 June 1557	Lewes, Sussex	
204.	Thomasina Wood	Mayfield, Sussex	maidservant of William Mainard	burnt 22 June 1557	Lewes, Sussex	
205.	Margery Morris (or Morice)	Heathfield, Sussex		burnt 22 June 1557	Lewes, Sussex	
206.	James Morris (or Morice) – son of Margery	Heathfield, Sussex		burnt 22 June 1557	Lewes, Sussex	
207.	Denis Burcis (or Burgis)	Buxted, Sussex		burnt 22 June 1557	Lewes, Sussex	
208.	Ann Ashdon (or Ashdown; also referred to as 'Ashdon's Wife')	Rotherfield, Sussex		burnt 22 June 1557	Lewes, Sussex	
209.	Mary Groves (also referred to as 'Gloue's Wife')	Lewes, Sussex		burnt 22 June 1557	Lewes, Sussex	(Note: May be the same as Christian Grover of the archdeaconry of Lewes)
210.	Simon Miller (or Milner)	Lynn, Norfolk		burnt 13 July 1557	Norwich, Norfolk	
211.	Elizabeth Cooper	St Andrew's Church, Norwich, Norfolk	wife of a pewterer	burnt 13 July 1557	Norwich, Norfolk	(which calls her 'a woman')
212.	George Egles/Eagles			hung, drawn & quartered, August 1557	Chelmsford, Essex	
	Colchester Martyrs of August 1557					
213.	William Bongeor	St Nicholas Parish, Colchester, Essex	glazier	burnt 2 August 1557	Colchester, Essex	
214.	William Purchase (or Purcas)	Bocking, Essex	fuller	burnt 2 August 1557	Colchester, Essex	
215.	Thomas Benhote (or Benold)	Colchester, Essex	tallow-chandler	burnt 2 August 1557	Colchester, Essex	
216.	Agnes Silverside (or Smith)	Colchester, Essex	widow	burnt 2 August 1557	Colchester, Essex	
217.	Helen (or Ellen) Ewring	Colchester, Essex	wife of John Ewring, miller	burnt 2 August 1557	Colchester, Essex	
218.	Elizabeth Folk	Colchester, Essex	'young maiden' and servant	burnt 2 August 1557	Colchester, Essex	
219.	William Munt (or Mount)	Much Bentley, Essex		burnt 2 August 1557	Colchester, Essex	
220.	Alice Munt (or Mount)	Much Bentley, Essex	wife of William Munt (or Mount)	burnt 2 August 1557	Colchester, Essex	
221.	Rose Allen (or Allin)	Much Bentley, Essex	spinster, daughter of Alice Mount	burnt 2 August 1557	Colchester, Essex	
222.	John Johnson	Thorpe, Essex	labourer	burnt 2 August 1557	Colchester, Essex	
223.	Richard Crashfield	Wymondham, Norfolk		burnt 5 August 1557	Norwich, Norfolk	which records 'one at Norwich' in July
224.	Father Fruier			burnt August 1557	Rochester, Kent	
225.	Robert Stevenson			burnt August 1557	Rochester, Kent	
226.	Sister of George Eagles			burnt August 1557	Rochester, Kent	
227.	Unknown Woman			burnt August 1557	Rochester, Kent	
228.	Agnes Prest	Boyton, Cornwall	Spinner	burnt 15 August 1557	Southernhay, Exeter	
229.	Thomas Benion		weaver	burnt 27 August 1557	Bristol	
230.	Joyce Lewis	Mancetter, Warwickshire	gentlewoman	burnt September 1557	Lichfield, Staffordshire	– may be the same as Joyce Bowes, August 1557 (the Regester)
231.	Ralph Allerton/Rafe Glaiton	Much Bentley, Essex		burnt 17 September 1557	Islington	
232.	James Austoo (or Auscoo)			burnt 17 September 1557	Islington	
233.	Margery Austoo (or Auscoo)			burnt 17 September 1557	Islington	
234.	Richard Roth (or Rooth)			burnt 17 September 1557	Islington	
235.	Agnes Bongeor (also known as Bowmer's Wife), wife of Richard Bongeor (similar name but different death date)			burnt 17 September (or unknown date July)	Colchester, Essex	(or March 1558, Colchester)
236.	Margaret Thurston/Widow Thurston-similar name but different death date			burnt 17 September (or unknown date July)	Colchester, Essex	(or March 1558, Colchester)
237.	Cicely Ormes	St Edmund's Parish, Norwich, Norfolk	wife of Edmund Ormes, worsted-weaver	burnt 23 September 1557	Norwich, Norfolk	
238.	Thomas Spurdance		servant of the Queen	burnt November 1557	Bury St Edmunds, Suffolk	
239.	John Halingdale/Hallingdale/Hollingday		carpenter	burnt, 18 November/or day unknown October 1557,	Smithfield, London	
240.	William Sparrow			burnt, 18 November/or day unknown October 1557,	Smithfield, London	
241.	Richard Gibson		gentleman	burnt, 18 November/or day unknown October 1557,	Smithfield, London	
242.	John Rough/Jhon Roughe	London/Islington, Middlesex	clergyman – minister at London/Islington, Middlesex	burnt 22 December 1557	Smithfield, London	
243.	Margaret Maring (or Mering)			burnt 22 December 1557	Smithfield, London	
244.	[Unknown forename ...] Lawton			burnt March 1558	Huntingdon, Huntingdonshire	
245. (Note: 'The Regester' states that a person called 'Hayne' was burnt along with Cuthbert Symion. However, this person is not mentioned in Foxe's Book of Martyrs.)	Cuthbert Symson/Symion	London/Islington, Middlesex	clergyman – deacon of the church in London/Islington, Middlesex	died 28 March 1558	Smithfield, London	
246.	Hugh Foxe		hosier	died 28 March 1558	Smithfield, London	
247.	John Devinish/Jhon Denneshe		wool winder	died 28 March 1558	Smithfield, London	
248.	William Nichol			burnt 9 April 1558	SM9515 Haverfordwest/Hwlffordd, Pembrokeshire/Sir Benfro	
249.	William Seaman (or Symon)	Mendlesham, Suffolk	husbandman	burnt 19 May 1558	Norwich, Norfolk	
250.	Thomas Hudson	Aylsham, Norfolk	glover	burnt 19 May 1558	Norwich, Norfolk	described as 'Glouer' in
251.	Thomas Carman			burnt 19 May 1558	Norwich, Norfolk	
252.	William Harris			burnt 26 May 1558	Colchester	
253.	Richard Day			burnt 26 May 1558	Colchester	
254.	Christian George (female)			burnt 26 May 1558	Colchester, Essex	her husband had previously been married to Agnes George, mentioned above
	Islington Martyrs					
255.	Henry Pond (or Houde)			burnt 27 June 1558	Smithfield, London	
256.	Reinald Eastland (or Launder)			burnt 27 June 1558	Smithfield, London	
257.	Robert Southain (or Southam)			burnt 27 June 1558	Smithfield, London	
258.	Matthew Ricarby (or Ricarbie)			burnt 27 June 1558	Smithfield, London	
259.	John Floyd (or Flood)			burnt 27 June 1558	Smithfield, London	
260.	John Holiday (or Hollyday)			burnt 27 June 1558	Smithfield, London	
261.	Roger Holland	London (taken in or near St John's Wood)	merchant tailor	burnt 27 June 1558	Smithfield, London	
262.	Sir Richard Yeoman (or Yeman)	Hadleigh, Suffolk	clergyman – curate of Hadleigh, Suffolk	burnt 10 July 1558	Norwich, Norfolk	
	Islington Martyrs (second group)					
263.	Robert Mills			burnt 14 July 1558	Brentford, Middlesex	
264.	Stephen Cotton			burnt 14 July 1558	Brentford, Middlesex	
265.	Robert Dynes			burnt 14 July 1558	Brentford, Middlesex	
266.	Stephen Wight (or Wreight)			burnt 14 July 1558	Brentford, Middlesex	
267.	John Slade			burnt 14 July 1558	Brentford, Middlesex	
268.	William Pikes (aliases: Pikas, Peckes)		tanner	burnt 14 July 1558	Brentford, Middlesex	
269.	John Cooke		sawyer	burnt about 25 July 1558	Bury St Edmunds, Suffolk	
270.	Robert Milles (or Plummer)		shearman	burnt about 25 July 1558	Bury St Edmunds, Suffolk	
271.	Alexander Lane		wheelwright	burnt about 25 July 1558	Bury St Edmunds, Suffolk	
272.	James Ashley		bachelor	burnt about 25 July 1558	Bury St Edmunds, Suffolk	
273.	Thomas Benbrike/Benbridge		gentleman	burnt unknown day in July 1558	Winchester, Hampshire	
274.	John (or Richard) Snell	Bedale, Yorkshire		burnt 9 September 1558	Richmond, Yorkshire	
	Ipswich Martyrs of 1558					
275.	Alexander Gooch (or Geche, or Gouch)	Woodbridge or Melton, Suffolk	weaver of shredding-coverlets	burnt 4 November 1558	Ipswich Cornhill	
276. (Note: 'The Regester' gives the name of the woman burnt with Alexander Gooch as Elizabeth Launson.)	Alice Driver	Grundisburgh, Suffolk	wife of a husbandman	burnt 4 November 1558	Ipswich Cornhill	
277.	Philip Humphrey (or Humfrey)			burnt November 1558	Bury St Edmunds, Suffolk	
278.	John David/Jhon Dauy (brother of Henry David)			burnt November 1558	Bury St Edmunds, Suffolk	
279.	Henry David/H. Dauy (brother of John David)			burnt November 1558	Bury St Edmunds, Suffolk	
	Canterbury Martyrs of 1558					
280.	John Corneford	Wrotham, Kent		burnt 15 November 1558	Canterbury, Kent	
281.	Christopher Brown	Maidstone, Kent		burnt 15 November 1558	Canterbury, Kent	
282.	John Herst	Ashford, Kent		burnt 15 November 1558	Canterbury, Kent	
283.	Alice Snoth			burnt 15 November 1558	Canterbury, Kent	
284.	Katherine Knight/Tynley		an aged woman	burnt 15 November 1558	Canterbury, Kent	
	Note: Mary I died on 17 November 1558.					
Radical Protestants executed under Elizabeth I
1.	Jan Wielmacker (Note: An Anabaptist)	Dutchman – member of a conventicle in Aldgate, London		22 July 1575	Smithfield, London	
2.	Hendrik Ter Woort	Dutchman – member of a conventicle in Aldgate, London		22 July 1575	Smithfield, London	
3.	Matthew Hamont (Note: A Unitarian)	Hethersett, Norfolk	ploughwright	20 May 1579	Norwich Castle	
4.	John Lewes			18 September 1583	Norwich, Norfolk	
5.	Peter Cole	Ipswich, Suffolk	tanner	1587	Norwich	
6.	Francis Kett	Wymondham, Norfolk	clergyman and physician	14 January 1589	Norwich Castle	-
7.	John Greenwood	London	Puritan divine: Separatist	6 April 1593	London	-
8.	Henry Barrowe (or Barrow)	London	lawyer : Separatist	6 April 1593	London	-
9.	John Penry	born Llangammarch, Powys, arrested Ratcliffe, London	writer and preacher	29 May 1593	St Thomas a Watering, Old Kent Road, London	
Radical Protestants executed under James I
1.	Bartholomew Legate (Note: An Arian)	Hornchurch, Essex	cloth trader	18 March 1612	Smithfield, London	
2.	Edward Wightman	Burton-upon-Trent, Staffordshire	mercer and minister	11 April 1612	Lichfield, Staffordshire	

== Also mentioned by Foxe ==
- John Fortune (or Cutler) (of Hintlesham, Suffolk, blacksmith, either burnt or died in prison)
- John Warner of Bourne
- Thomas Athoth, priest 'he may have died in prison, escaped or – less likely – been pardoned.'
- John Ashedon of Catsfield

== Posthumous proceedings ==
- William Tracy of Toddington, Gloucestershire, 'worshipful esquire', exhumed and burnt, 1532
- John Tooley, poulterer, exhumed and burnt, 4 June 1555
- James Trevisam, died 3 July 1555 and summoned posthumously to appear before the bishop
- Catherine, wife of Peter Martyr Vermigli, exhumed 1556, Cambridge
- Martin Bucer, Professor of Divinity, exhumed and burnt 6 February 1557, Cambridge
- Paul Fagius, Lecturer in Hebrew, exhumed and burnt 6 February 1557, Cambridge
- Joan Seaman, early 1558, refused burial at Mendlesham
- John Glover, gentleman, 'about the latter end of Queen Mary', ordered to be exhumed
- William Glover, September 1558, refused burial at Wem, Shropshire
- Edward Burton, 15 January 1559, refused burial at Shrewsbury

== Those who sickened or died in prison ==
No.	Name	Residence	Description	Date of death	Place of death	References
	Henry VIII					
1.	Christopher, a Dutchman	Antwerp, Flanders		1531	died in prison at Westminster	
2.	John Porter	Chipping Campden, Gloucestershire and St Sepulchre's, London	tailor	1542	Newgate Prison, London	
3.	Thomas Sommers	London	merchant	About 1542	Tower of London,	
	Mary I					
1C.	John Alcock (or Awcock)	Hadleigh, Suffolk	shearman	2 April 1555	Newgate Prison, London	
2.	William Minge		clergyman – priest	2 July 1555	Maidstone Prison, Kent	
3.	John Aleworth			July 1555	Reading Prison, Berkshire	(Note: may be the same as William Ailewarde (the Regester))
4.	... Tingle			September 1555	Newgate Prison, London	
5. (Note: Richard Smith is said to have died in prison (day unknown) September, Lowlar's Tower/Lollard's Tower, Lambeth Palace, London in 'the Regester', but is described as 'non-existent' in)	George Kyng (or King)			September 1555	sickened in Lollard's Tower	
6.	Jhon Lesse			September 1555	Newgate Prison, London	(Note: may be the same as Thomas Leyes of Thorpe, Essex, sickened in Lollard's Tower, died (day unknown) September, Location unknown)
7.	John Wade			September 1555	sickened in Lollard's Tower	
8.	William Androwes (or Andrew, or Andrews)	Horsley, Essex	carpenter	September 1555	Newgate Prison, London	
9.	James Gore			7 December 1555	Colchester Prison, Essex	
10.	William Wiseman		clothworker	13 December 1555,	Lowlar's Tower/Lollard's Tower, Lambeth Palace, London	
11.	Margaret Eliot (or Ellis)	Billericay, Essex	maid	May 1556	Newgate Prison, London	
12.	William Sleeke (or Slech)			31 May 1556	'King's Bench' Southwark, Surrey	
13.	William Adheral		minister	24 June 1556	'King's Bench' Southwark, Surrey	
14.	John Clemente		wheelwright	26 June 1556	'King's Bench' Southwark, Surrey	
15.	Thomas Parret			27 June 1556	'King's Bench' Southwark, Surrey	
16.	Martyne Hunte			29 June 1556	'King's Bench' Southwark, Surrey	
17.	John Morris (or Morice)			29 June 1556	'King's Bench' Southwark, Surrey	
18.	John Careless	Coventry, Warwickshire	weaver	1 July 1556	'King's Bench' Southwark, Surrey	
19.–21.	William Dangerfield, his wife Joan and their infant child				sickened in prison	
22.–24.	Three people			October 1556	Chichester Castle, Sussex (or Canterbury Castle, Kent, according to Knox)	
25.	John Clark			in or after November 1556	Canterbury Castle, Kent	
26.	Dunston Chittenden			in or after November 1556	Canterbury Castle, Kent	
27.	William Foster	Stone, Kent		in or after November 1556	Canterbury Castle, Kent	
28.	Alice Potkins	Staplehurst, Kent		in or after November 1556	Canterbury Castle, Kent	
29.	John Archer	Cranbrook, Kent		in or after November 1556	Canterbury Castle, Kent	
30.	John Thurston	taken at Much Bentley, Essex		May 1557	Colchester Castle, Essex	
31.	N. Ambrose			about June 1557 (according to Foxe), or July 1557 (according to Farr)	Maidstone Prison, Kent	
32.	John Dale	Hadleigh, Suffolk	weaver		Bury St Edmunds Prison	
33.	Matthew Withers (or Wythers)			June 1558	Newgate Prison, London	
34.	Thomas Tyler			June 1558	Newgate Prison, London	

== See also ==
- Marian exiles
- Martyrs' Memorial
- Foxe's Book of Martyrs
- Religion in the United Kingdom
- Oxford Martyrs
- List of people executed in Smithfield
- Coventry Martyrs
- Martyrs Mirror, a book with a similar theme dealing with primarily with Anabaptist martyrs
- Short, sharp shock
