= List of people executed in Smithfield =

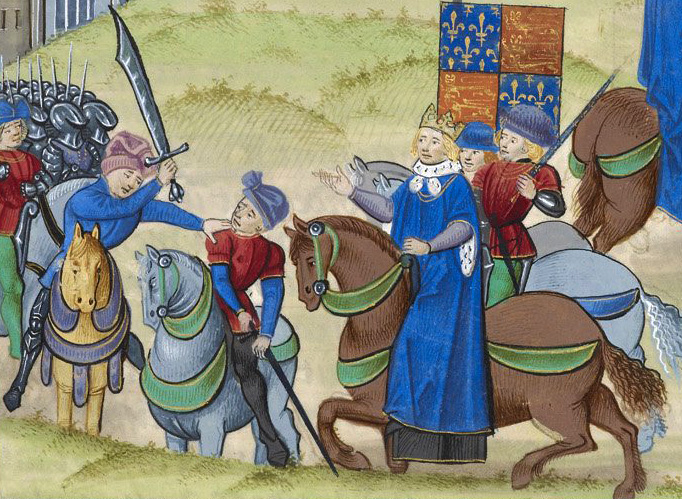
Wat Tyler's death

Smithfield was one of the most important locations for public executions in the medieval and modern City of London. The following people were among those executed there.

William Wallace; executed at Smithfield Elms on August 23rd 1305. Was not an Englishman and therefore cannot be listed as a traitor.

== Traitors ==
People charged with and convicted of treason (or high treason):

- Wat Tyler (1381)
- Margaret Cheyne (1537)
- Edward Arden (1583), beheaded; his head put on London Bridge and his body quartered and placed on the city's gates

== Heretics ==
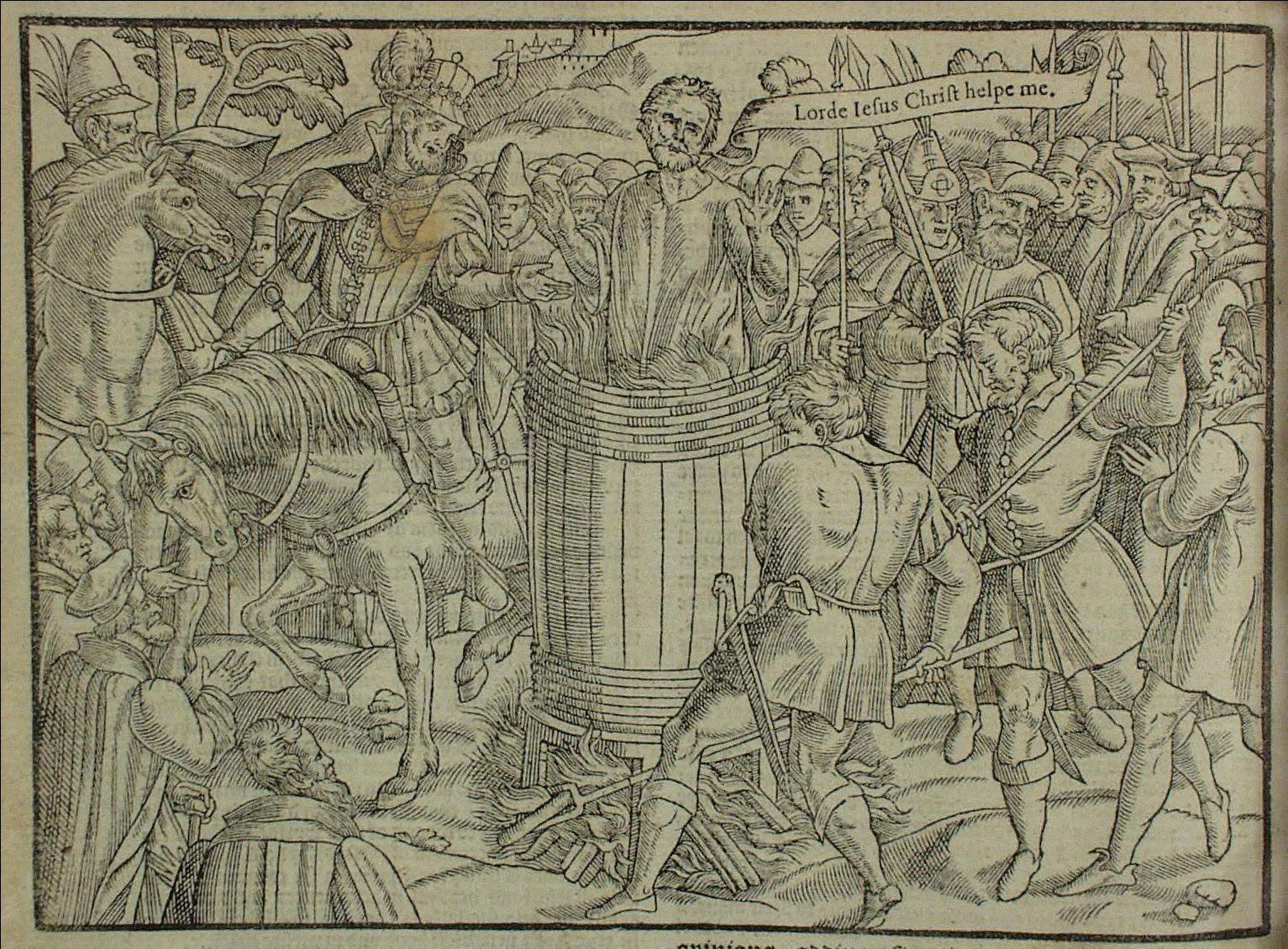
John Badby's death, burned in a barrel (from John Foxe's Book of Martyrs, 1563)

People charged with and convicted of heresy:

- William Sawtrey (1401)
- John Badby (1410)
- Thomas Bagley (1431)
- Richard Bayfield (1531)
- John Tewkesbury (1531)
- James Bainham (1532)
- John Frith (1533)
- Andrew Hewet (1533)
- John Lambert (1538)
- John Forrest (1538)
- Two Dutch Anabaptists, a man and a woman (1538)
- William Collins (1540)
- Robert Barnes (1540)
- Thomas Gerrard (1540)
- William Jerome (1540)
- Richard Fetherston (1540)
- Edward Powell (1540)
- Thomas Abel (1540)
- Anne Askew (1546)
- Nicholas Belenian (1546)
- John Adams (1546)
- John Lascelles(1546)
- Joan Bocher (1550)
- John Rogers (1555)
- Thomas Tomkins (1555)
- John Cardmaker (1555)
- John Warne (1555)
- John Bradford (1555)
- John Leaf (1555)
- John Philpot (1555)
- Thomas Whittle (1556)
- Bartholomew Green (1556)
- Thomas Brown (1556)
- John Tudson (1556)
- John Went (1556)
- Isobella Forster (1556)
- Joan Lushford (1556)
- William Tyms, burnt 24 April (1556)
- Robert Drake, burnt 24 April (1556)
- Richard Spurge, burnt 24 April (1556)
- Thomas Spurge, burnt 24 April (1556)
- George Ambrose, burnt 24 April (1556)
- John Cavel, burnt 24 April (1556)
- John Rough (1557)
- Robert Southain (1558)
- Roger Holland (1558)
- Nicholas Horner (1590)
- Bartholomew Legate (1612)
