= William Pygot =

English Protestant martyr

William Pygot was a sixteenth-century English butcher and Protestant martyr. His story was recorded in Foxe's Book of Martyrs. For denying transubstantiation, he was burned to death at Braintree, Essex, on 28 March 1555.

According to John Foxe, Pygot was examined and condemned to death alongside Thomas Tomkins, William Hunter, Stephen Knight, and John Lawrence by the Bishop of London, Edmund Bonner on 9 February 1555. Unlike his contemporaries, there is no mention of the extent of Pygot's suffering in prison or torture, if indeed he was tortured at all. Pygot was martyred on the same day as Knight, who was burned alive in nearby Maldon.

Upon the opening of Braintree Town Hall in 1928, the upper walls of the council chamber were painted by Maurice Greiffenhagen. Murals representing the history of the town from the Roman era to the twentieth century include a representation of Pygot moments before his pyre was lit. Due to its close proximity to the ancient market place, it is believed that the Town Hall stands on the site of execution.

In 2012, the Braintree & Bocking Civic Society funded a blue plaque to commemorate his martyrdom. It is located on the courtyard wall of the library.
