= Cardmaker =

Cardmaker may refer to:

- Cardmaking, the craft of hand-making cards
- Cardmaker, a maker of playing cards
- Richard Cardmaker (fl. 1376–1399), MP for Devizes
- John Cardmaker (1496–1555), English Protestant martyr.
