= Colchester Martyrs =

16th-century Protestants executed for heresy in Colchester, Essex, England

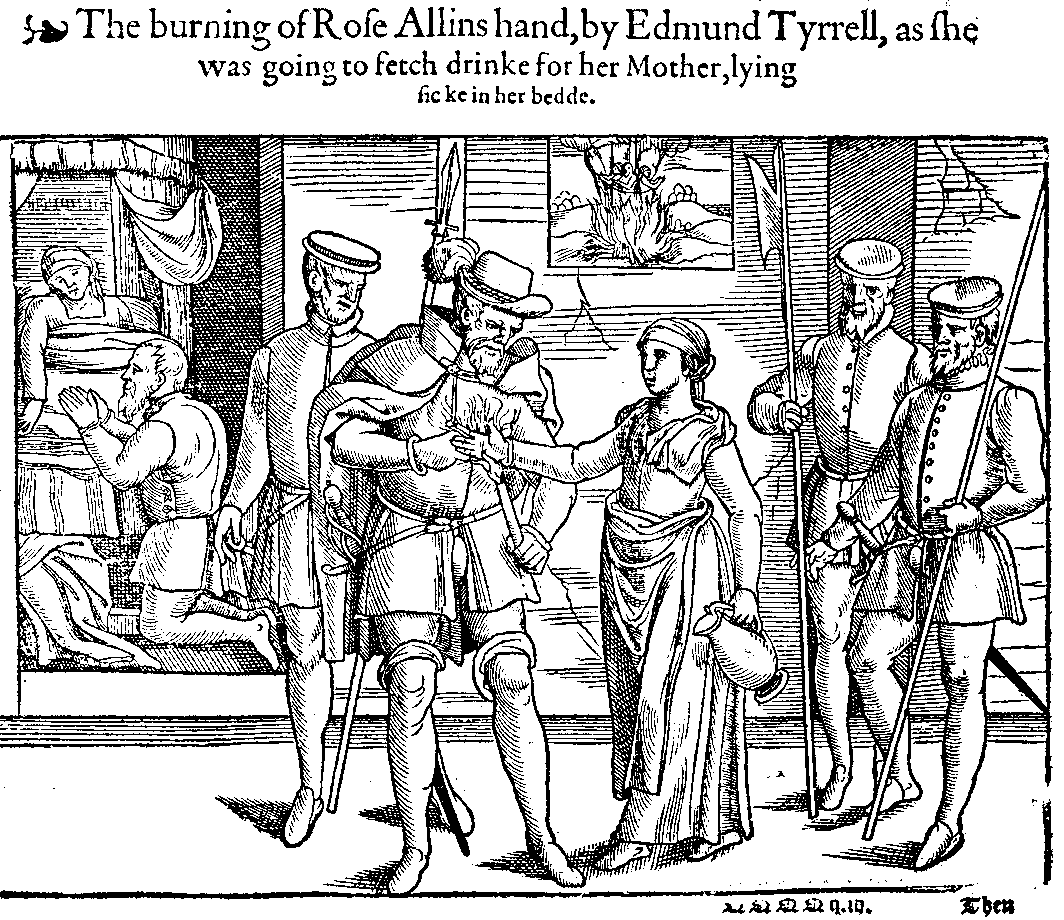
A 17th century woodcut showing Rose Allin or Allen, being arrested together with her stepfather and mother, William and Alice Mount or Munt on 7 March 1557 for their Protestant beliefs. They, along with seven others, were burnt at the stake at Colchester on 2 August 1557; some of the Colchester Martyrs.

The Colchester Martyrs were 16th-century English Protestant martyrs. They were executed for heresy in Colchester, Essex, during the reigns of Henry VIII and Mary I. Their story is recorded in Foxe's Book of Martyrs.

== 1545 or 1546 ==
"[O]ne Henry" and his servant were burned at the stake.

== 29 March 1555 ==
John Lawrence, a priest and former Blackfriar at Sudbury, Suffolk was burned at the stake.

== 14 June 1555 ==
Nicholas Chamberlain (or Chamberlaine), a weaver from Coggeshall, Essex was burned at the stake.

== 28 April 1556 ==
Christopher Lister, a husbandman from Dagenham, Essex, John Mace, an apothecary from Colchester, Essex, John Spencer, a weaver from Colchester, Essex, Simon Joyne, a sawyer, Richard Nicol, a weaver from Colchester, Essex and John Hamond, a tanner from Colchester, Essex were burned at the stake.

== 2 August 1557 ==
William Bongeor, Thomas Benhote, William Purchase, Agnes Silverside, Helen Ewring, Elizabeth Folk, William Munt, John Johnson, Alice Munt and Rose Allen were taken to Colchester Castle and burned at the stake.

== 17 September 1557 ==
Agnes Bongeor, wife of Richard Bongeor, John Kurde, and Margaret (Widow) Thurston were burned at the stake

== 26 May 1558 ==
William Harris, Richard Day and Christian George (female) were burned at the stake.

== Those who died in prison ==
James Gore died on 7 December 1555 in Colchester prison and John Thurston, who had been taken at Much Bentley, Essex, died in May 1557 in Colchester Castle.

== Monuments ==
A monument to these victims of the Marian persecutions is in St Peter's Church on North Hill; another is in the Colchester Town Hall.

== See also ==
- List of Protestant martyrs of the English Reformation
