= Stratford Martyrs Memorial =

Memorial in London

Coordinates: 51.541561°N 0.002618°E

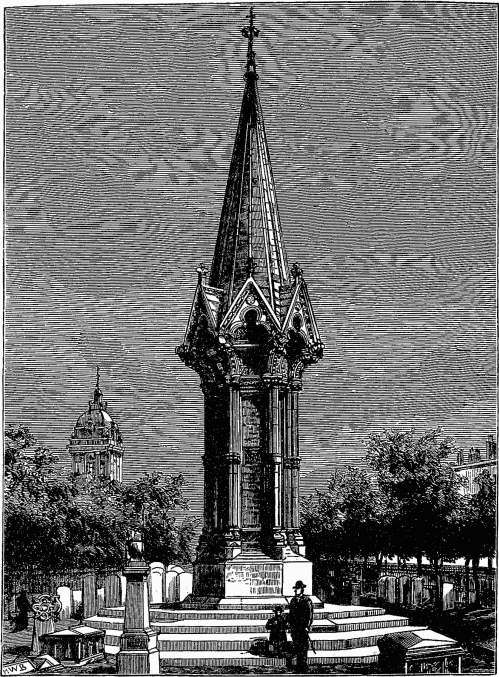
A contemporary engraving of The Martyrs' Memorial in the churchyard of St John the Evangelist Church, Stratford, which was unveiled by Lord Shaftesbury on 2 August 1879.

The Stratford Martyrs Memorial is a memorial that commemorates the group of 11 men and two women who were burned at the stake together for their Protestant beliefs, at Stratford-le-Bow or Stratford near London in England on 27 June 1556, during the Marian persecutions.

In 1879, a large monument was erected in St John's churchyard in Stratford Broadway, to commemorate the 13 and others who were executed or tortured in Stratford during the persecutions. Designed by J T Newman, it consists of an ornate hexagonal column, capped with a 12-sided spire rising to a height of 65 feet. One side of the column carries a terra cotta plaque, sculpted in relief, based on the illustration of the martyrdom in Foxe's book. The other panels carry the names of the 13 martyrs, together with Elizabeth Warne (burnt 23 August 1555), Stephen Harwood (burnt 30 August 1555), Hugh Laverock and John Apprice (both burnt 15 May 1556). Also included are Patrick Packingham, who was actually executed at Uxbridge and the Reverend Thomas Rose, the Vicar of All Saints Church, West Ham, who "was tortured and exiled for preaching against auricular confession, transubstantiation, purgatory and images". The memorial is Grade II listed on the National Heritage List for England.

The monument was paid for by public subscription; the chairman of the appeal committee was Rev. William Jay Bolton, the Vicar of Stratford. It was inaugurated in a ceremony on 2 August 1879, presided over by the Earl of Shaftesbury, who made a strongly anti-Catholic speech. The opinion of The Graphic, a national weekly newspaper, was that "Language of this sort is better calculated to wound the feelings of many good people than to break down barriers that already too effectually divide the different denominations."
