= Pygot =

Pygot is a surname. Notable people with the surname include:

- Margaret Pygot, 15th century English prioress
- William Pygot, Protestant martyr
- Francis Pygot, High Sheriff of Buckinghamshire in 1527
