= John Launder =

English Protestant martyr

- Born: 1530
- Died: 1555 (aged 24–25)

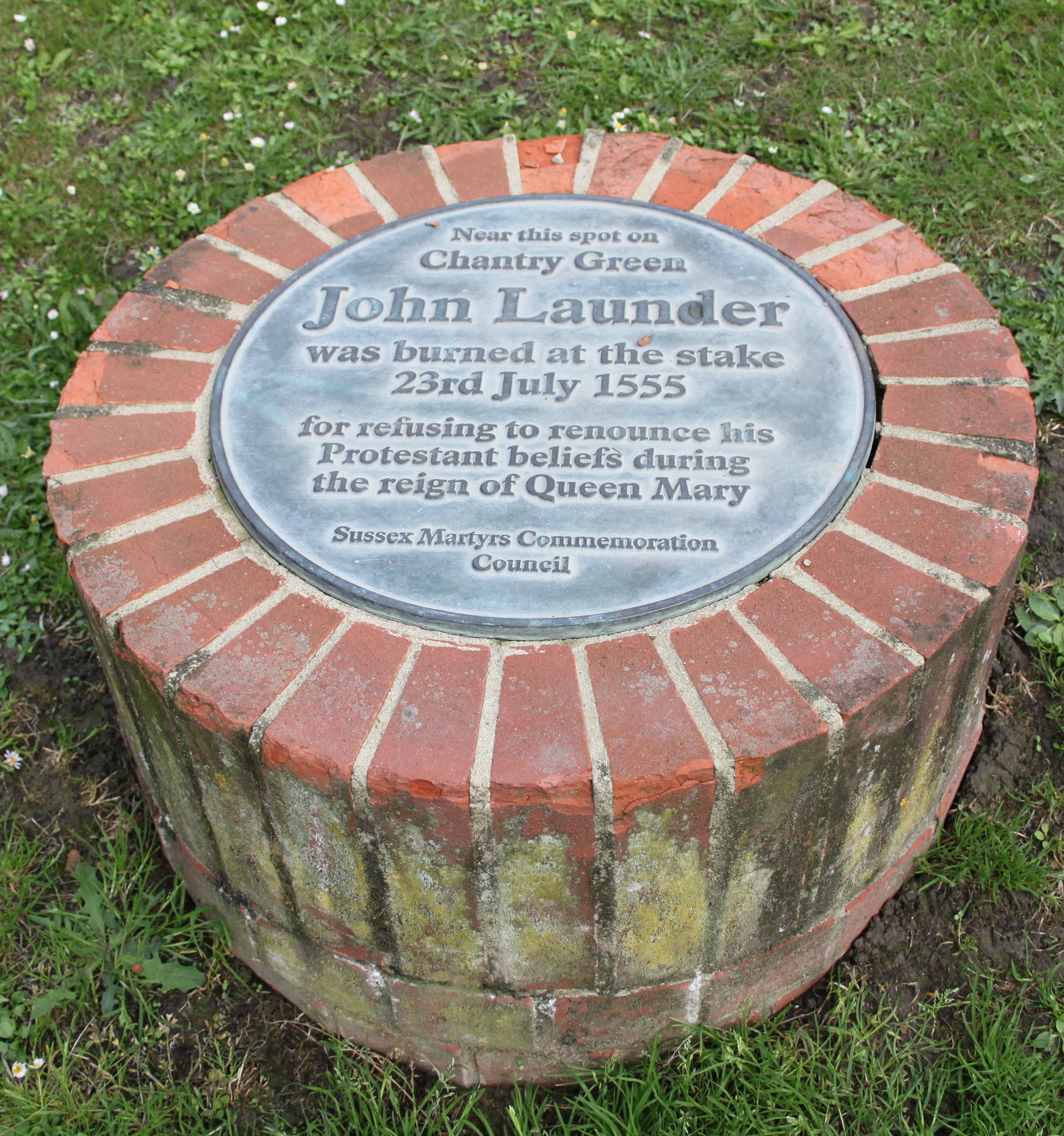
The Launder Memorial in Steyning

John Launder (1530–1555) was an English Protestant martyr. He was executed in 1555 during a period of religious persecutions in England.

Launder was a husbandman of the parish of Godstone. He was seized with Dirick Carver.

There is a memorial to John Launder in Steyning where he was martyred. The memorial is pictured on the website of Steyning Museum; The event of his martyring has been described as "one of the darkest days in Steyning's 1200 year history."

== See also ==
- Dirick Carver
- History of Christianity in Sussex
- Lewes Martyrs
