= Thomas More (Protestant martyr) =

Thomas More (also spelled Moor), birth date unknown, died 26 June 1556, was one of the Protestant martyrs of the English Reformation. Described by John Foxe as "a merchant's servant" and apparently just 24 years old when he died, he was tried for heresy by Dr John White the Bishop of Lincoln in the churches of St Martin and St Margaret in Leicester on April 21, 1556 and burned at the stake in the same town on June 26 later that year. He was the only Protestant martyr to die at Leicester as a result of Mary I's Revival of the Heresy Acts.

== Trial record ==
The trial of the 21st of April was part of a general round of visitation undertaken by Bishop White at Cardinal Pole's instigation, part of restoring Roman Catholic worship in parishes of the Diocese of Lincoln and searching for heretics. The odd set up in Leicester where the suburbs fell into a prebend required two separate hearings, one in the Court of the Archdeacon in the south aisle of what is now Leicester Cathedral and in the Prebendal Court held in the Prebendal Church of St Margaret's. John Nichols preserves the Latin original of the trial record from the Registers of the Diocese of Lincoln of which the following is a rough translation:

“Thomas More appeared before us, as usual, in the Parish Church of St. Martin in Leicester, and afterwards also in the Prebendal Church of St. Margaret, on the 21st of April 1556, and defended many heresies; saying among other things: "This is my faith, that in the Sacrament of the Altar is not the Body of Christ; no more than if I myself should give one piece of bread, and say, Take, eat, this is my body; meaning my own body within my doublet." Hence a sentence was passed against him. It was written to the Lord King and Queen: and by De Heretico Comburendo (On Burning a Heretic) at the aforesaid Leicester, he was burned in the month of June. (Note: Thomas More in Ecclesiâ parochiali Divi Martini Leicestrie, ac post etiam in Ecclesiâ Divi Margarete, XXI die Apralis 1556, coram nobis comparuit, et multas Hereses defendit ; dicens inter cetere : “This is my faith, that in the Sacrament of the Altar is not the Body of Christ; no more than if I myself should give one piece of bread, and say, Take, eat, this is my body ; meaning my own body within my doublet.” Unde sententie contra ipsum lata. Scriptum est ad Dominem Regem et Reginem : et per Brave De Heretico Comburendo, apud Leicester predict’, mense Junii fuit combustus.“)

He was sentenced for holding a Zwinglian memorialist view of the Eucharist denying transubstantiation. The delay between the date of More's sentence and that of his execution was due to the necessity of a royal signature to approve the death sentence.

== John Foxe's account of the death ==
The Protestant martyrologist and hagiographer John Foxe preserved the following record in his enormously successful work Acts and Monuments:

”The next day following of the said month of June, we read of a certain young man, a merchant's servant, who for the like godliness suffered cruel persecution of the papists, and was burnt at Leicester the twenty-sixth day of the month of June above-named.”

Aside from the trial from the Diocesan Register this is the major near contemporary source. Neither the precise location of his burning or any details of it are mentioned by any historic source. He was apparently just 24 at the time he died.

== See also ==
- List of Protestant martyrs of the English Reformation
