= Braintree Town Hall =

Municipal building in Braintree, Essex, England

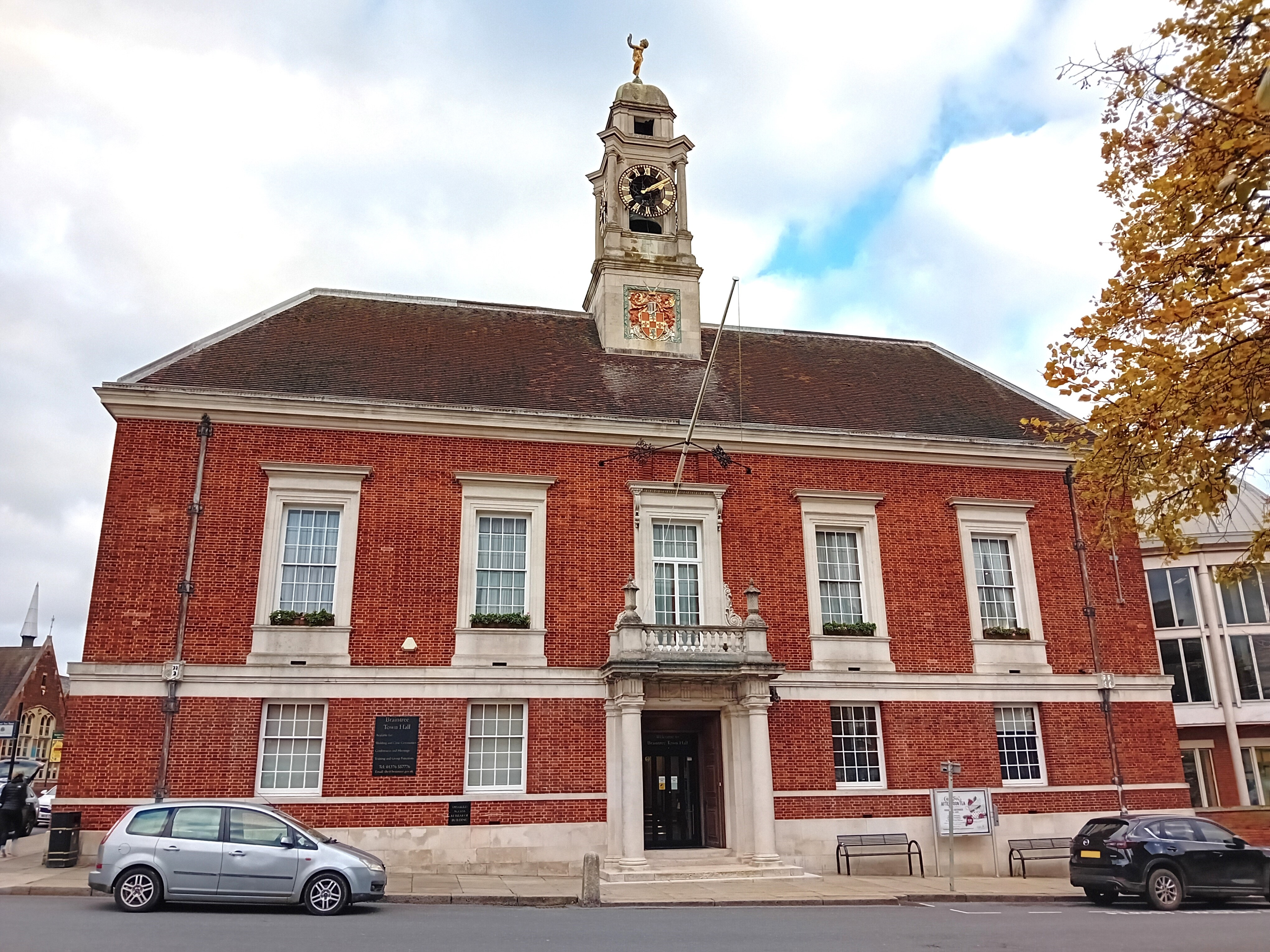
- Braintree Town Hall

- Shown in Essex
- 51.8780°N 0.5534°E
- Location: Braintree

History
- Built: 1928

Site notes
- Architect: E. Vincent Harris
- Architectural style: Classical style

Listed Building – Grade II*
- Designated: 27 April 1992
- Reference no.: 1235026

Braintree Town Hall is a municipal facility in the Market Square in Braintree, Essex, England. The town hall, which was the headquarters of Braintree and Bocking Urban District Council, is a Grade II* listed building.

== History ==
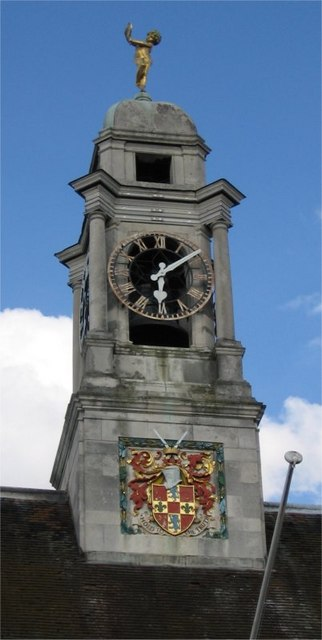
A view of the turret on the building

In the early 20th century meetings of Braintree Urban District Council were held in the old Vestry Hall in St. Michael's Lane. After the local businessman, William Courtauld, declared that he would pay for a bespoke town hall, civic leaders decided to procure a new building: the site selected had previously formed part of a piece of open land known as Fairfield.

The foundation stone for the new building was laid by the local gun shop manager and council chairman, George Bartram, on 16 October 1926. It was designed by E. Vincent Harris in the Classical style and was officially opened by the Earl of Crawford and Balcarres on 22 May 1928. The design involved a symmetrical main frontage with five bays facing onto the Market Square; the central section featured a portico with Doric order columns supporting a balustrade with urns at the corners; there were sash windows on the first floor and, at roof level, there was a turret bearing the town's coat of arms and containing a clock and bells made by Gillett & Johnston; it was topped with a dome and a female figure at its apex.

Internally, the principal rooms were the council chamber and chairman's room. The council chamber was panelled and the upper parts of the walls were decorated with murals depicting local scenes by Maurice Greiffenhagen. The scenes depicted included the Roman Army marching through Braintree during the Roman conquest of Britain in AD 43, the Viking victory at the Battle of Maldon in 991, King John presenting the town's charter to the Bishop of London, Richard FitzNeal, in 1190, the burning at the stake of William Pygot in 1555, the introduction of new weaving techniques by Flemish immigrants in 1570 and the sailing of Braintree emigrants on the Lyon's Whelp for the Massachusetts Bay Colony in 1632. The chairmen's room was also panelled and the upper parts of the walls were decorated with murals depicting the seasons of the year by Sir Henry Rushbury. The ceiling in the chairman's room was decorated with a richly-coloured map of Essex which was also painted by Rushbury. The stained glass window on the staircase, which depicted a female figure holding the town's coat of arms, was designed by George Kruger Gray.

The building served as the headquarters of Braintree and Bocking Urban District Council until 1974, when it became the local seat of government for the enlarged Braintree District Council. However, in 1981, civic leaders moved their headquarters to more substantial facilities at Causeway House in Bocking End. The town hall then became a community arts facility known as the Braintree Town Hall Centre. A tourist information centre was also established in the building and, following an extensive programme of refurbishment works completed in April 2012, it also became a local venue for weddings and civil partnerships.
