= Braintree and Bocking =

Former local government area in the UK

Coordinates: 51.8779°N 0.5533°E

- Urban District
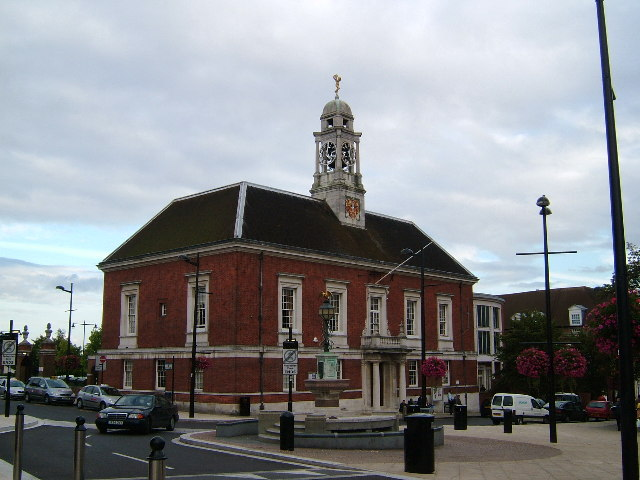
- Population
  - 1939: 16,854
  - 1971: 24,255
- History
  - Created: 1 April 1934
  - Abolished: 31 March 1974
  - Succeeded by: Braintree District
  - HQ: Braintree
- Contained within
  - County: Essex

Braintree and Bocking was an urban district in Essex, England. It was created in 1934 as a merger of the old urban district of Braintree with the neighbouring parish of Bocking. The district was abolished in 1974 and now forms part of the wider Braintree District.

== History ==
The parish of Braintree had been governed by a local board from 1850. Such local boards were reconstituted as urban district councils in 1894. By the early 1930s the urban area of Braintree was growing beyond its historic parish boundaries, particularly into the parish of Bocking to the north. On 1 April 1934 a new parish and urban district called "Braintree and Bocking" was created, covering the area of the former urban district and parish of Braintree and the parish of Bocking, which were abolished. At the same time there were also some adjustments to the boundaries with the neighbouring parishes of Black Notley, Gosfield, Rayne and Stisted.

The council was based at Braintree Town Hall in the Market Square in Braintree, which had been built in 1928 for the old Braintree Urban District Council.

On 1 April 1974, Braintree and Bocking Urban District was abolished and merged with Braintree Rural District, Halstead Rural District, Halstead Urban District and Witham Urban District to form a new non-metropolitan district called Braintree. No successor parish was created for the former Braintree and Bocking Urban district and so it became an unparished area. As of 2023 the former Braintree and Bocking Urban District remains the only unparished area in the Braintree district; proposals for it to be made a parish have been considered but not pursued. Halstead had a successor parish and Witham was parished in 1982.

The name "Braintree and Bocking" continues to be used by some local organisations based in the area, such as the Braintree and Bocking Public Gardens Trust.
