= Guernsey Martyrs =

Three women and one infant burned at the stake in Guernsey in 1556

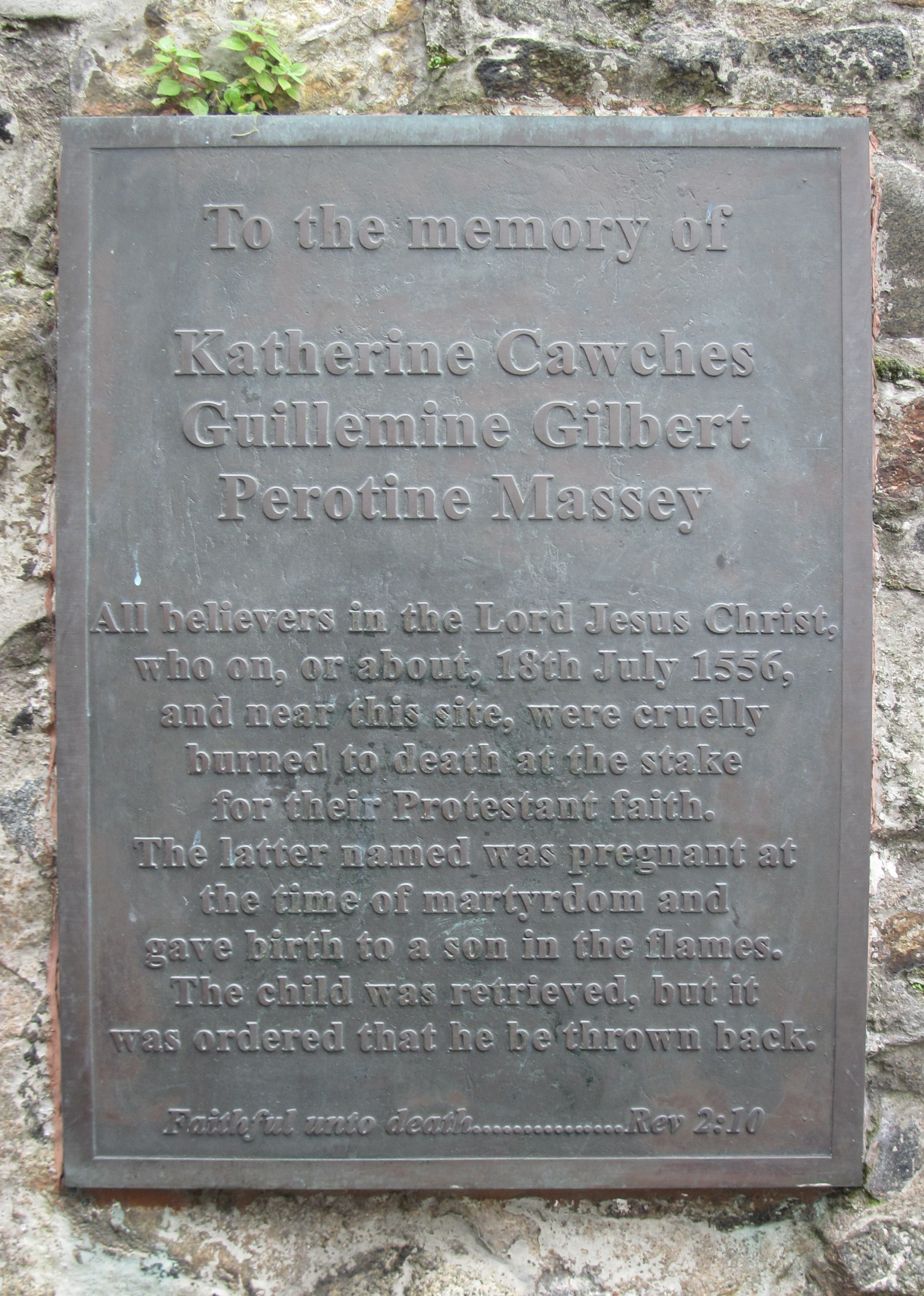
Plaque commemorating the Guernsey martyrs in Saint Peter Port

The Guernsey Martyrs were three women who were burned at the stake for their Protestant beliefs, in Guernsey, Channel Islands, in 1556 during the Marian persecutions.

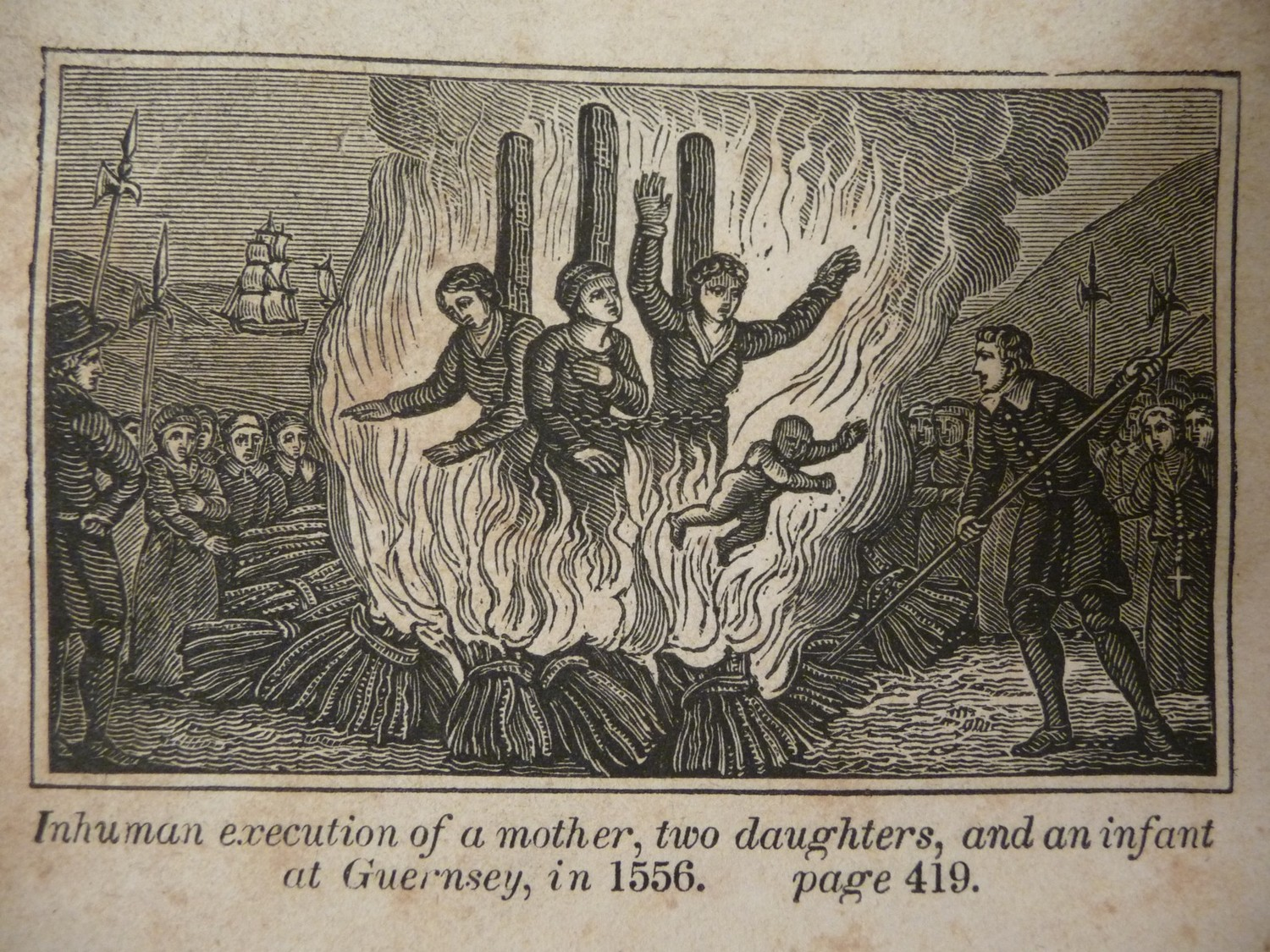
Mother Catherine Cauchés (centre) and her two daughters Guillemine Gilbert (left) and Perotine Massey (right) with her infant son burning for heresy

== Trial ==
Guillemine Gilbert and Perotine Massey were sisters, who lived with their mother, Catherine Cauchés (sometimes given as "Katherine Cawches"). Perotine was the wife of a Norman Calvinist minister, who was in London, possibly to avoid persecution. The three women were brought to court on a charge of receiving a stolen goblet. Although they were found to be not guilty of that charge, it emerged that their religious views were contrary to those required by the church authorities. They were returned to prison in Castle Cornet and later found guilty of heresy by an ecclesiastical court held in the Town Church and handed over to the Royal Court for sentencing where they were condemned to death.

== Execution ==
The execution was carried out on or around 18 July 1556. All three were burnt on the same fire; they ought to have been strangled beforehand, but the rope broke before they died and they were thrown into the fire alive. John Foxe recorded that Perotine was "great with child" and that "the belly of the woman burst asunder by the vehemence of the flame, the infant, being a fair man-child, fell into the fire". The baby was rescued by a W. House and laid on the grass, taken by the Provost to the Bailiff, Hellier Gosselin who ordered that "it should be carried back again, and cast into the fire".

== Legacy ==
On the death of Queen Mary (1558), the Bailiff and the Roman Catholic élite of the island were subjected to a series of commissions and investigations encompassing not only the circumstances of the execution of the women, but also embezzlement; James Amy, the Dean, was committed to prison in Castle Cornet and dispossessed of his living. Gosselin was dismissed from his post in 1562 but along with the Jurats managed to obtain a pardon from Elizabeth I.

Reactions to the executions played a role in the rise of Calvinism in the Channel Islands.

In 1567, Thomas Harding criticised Foxe's account, not for his description of the event, for which Foxe quotes eye-witnesses and official documents, but on the grounds that Perotine Massey was responsible for the death of her own child; had she revealed in court that she was pregnant, "pleading the belly", the execution would have had to have been postponed until after the birth.

A memorial plaque to the martyrs can be found on the Tower Hill steps in Saint Peter Port, near the site of the execution. It was unveiled at a commemorative service on 24 April 1999.

== See also ==
- List of Protestant martyrs of the English Reformation
