= Thomas Hawkes =

English protestant martyr

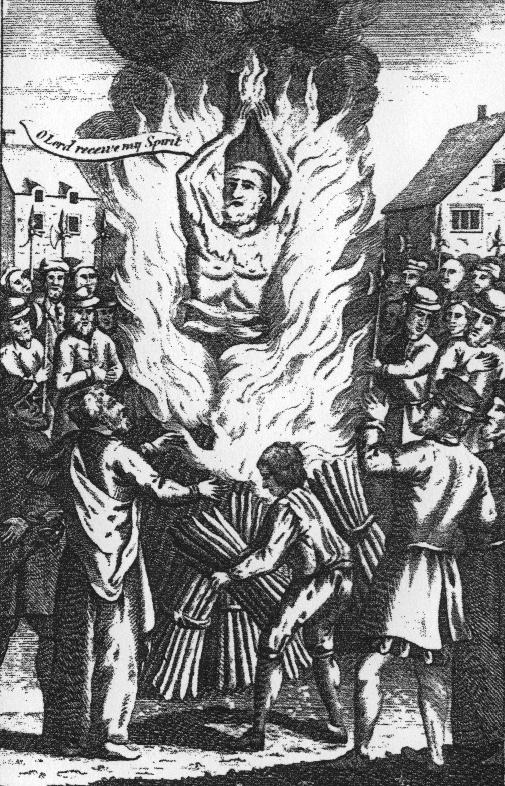
Thomas Hawkes on Market Hill; he is saying "O Lord receive my Spirit"

Thomas Hawkes was an English protestant martyr who burned to death in 1555 during the Marian Persecutions rather than allow his son to be baptised into the Roman Catholic Church.

Responding to Edmund Bonner, the Bishop of London, who urged him to return to Catholicism, he is reported to have said: "No my Lord, that I will not, for if I had a hundred bodies I would suffer them all to be torn in pieces rather than I will abjure and recant." He was sentenced to be burnt at the stake in Coggeshall, Essex.

As he burned, Hawkes threw up his hands and clapped them three times, a sign to his friends that the pain could be endured.

Hawkes' death and the circumstances leading up to it are recorded in detail in John Foxe's Book of Martyrs.
