= William Flower (martyr) =

English Protestant martyr

William Flower was a 16th-century English Protestant martyr. His story is recorded in Foxe's Book of Martyrs. He was burnt to death on 24 April 1555 at St. Margaret's churchyard, Westminster, London.

== Early life ==
Flower was born in Snailwell in Cambridgeshire. While still a boy he was sent to Ely Cathedral to live as a Benedictine monk. Upon the suppression of the monasteries he began working as priest. He then lived in various places around the country. He was married in Tewkesbury Abbey to Alice Pulton with whom he had three children. He worked for some time as a doctor and surgeon, despite lacking any qualifications to do so, and also as a schoolmaster in Northamptonshire. Finally he moved to Lambeth with his family, although spent much of his time away from home.

== Attack at St Margaret's Church ==
Flower was a Protestant, and for many years had rejected the doctrine of transubstantiation. On Easter Day 1555, intending to assault the celebrant at what he saw as a Popish mass, he made his way across the Thames to St Margaret's Church, Westminster. He had intended to do the same on the previous Christmas Day at St Paul’s Cathedral, but arriving at the cathedral he had not the resolve to do so. This time, however, he entered the church of Saint Margaret armed with a wood-knife (a large cleaver used by hunters for disjointing carcasses). He struck the priest administering the sacrament on the head and again on his arm, wounding him grievously and causing his blood to spill into the chalice containing the consecrated hosts. A great tumult ensued and Flower was seized and taken to Newgate prison.

== Trial and execution ==
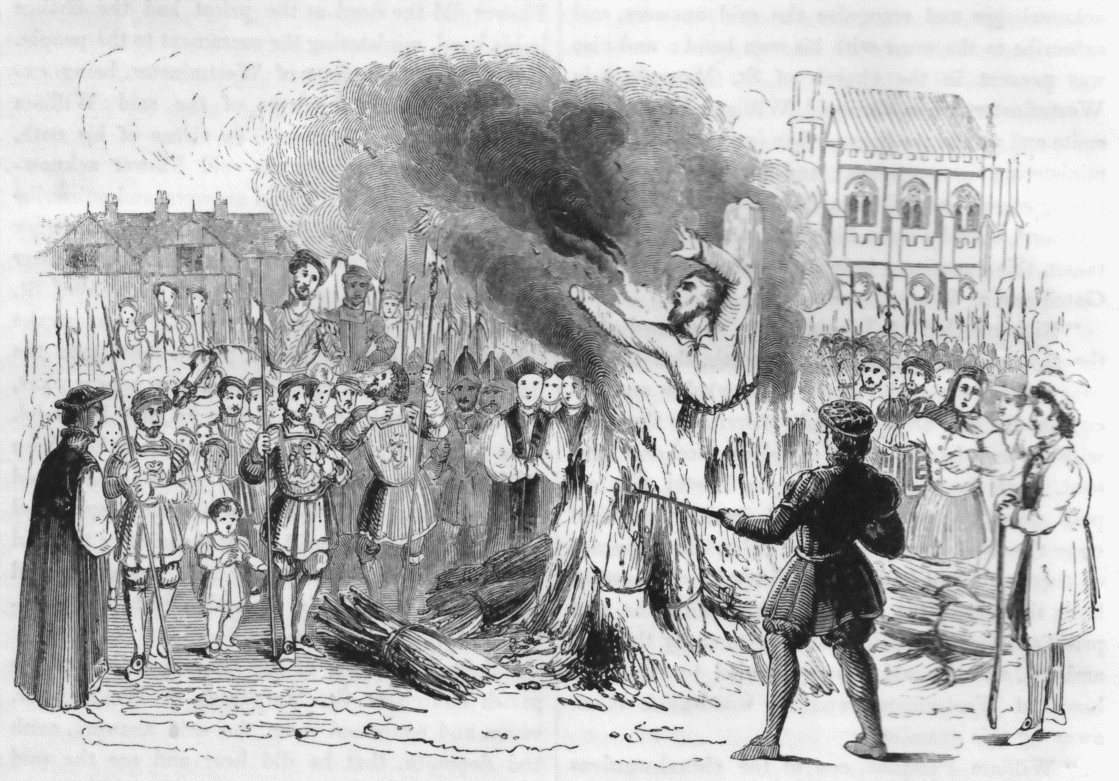
The execution of William Flower

Brought before Edmund Bonner, Bishop of London at the consistory court, Flower eventually repented for injuring the priest but refused to repent for the reason why he had done so. Bonner excommunicated him and then turned him over to the secular court whereupon he was sentenced to have his hand cut off and then be burnt at the stake.

On 24 April 1555 Flower was brought to St Margaret's Church and outside the churchyard was tied to a stake and his right hand cut off. Flower did not flinch at this:

And thus fire was set unto him, who burning therein, cried with a loud voice, "O the Son of God, have mercy upon me! O the Son of God, receive my soul!" three times; and so his speech being taken from him, he spake no more, lifting up, notwithstanding, his stump with his other arm, as long as he could. And thus endured this constant witness and faithful servant of God the extremity of the fire, being therein cruelly handled, by reason that to his burning little wood was brought; so that for lack of faggots, there being not sufficient to burn him, they were fain to strike him down into the fire; where he lying along (which was doleful to behold) upon the ground, his nether part was consumed in the fire, whilst his upper part was clean without the fire, his tongue in all men's sight still moving in his mouth.

== Bibliography ==
- Charles Smyth Sunday (22 April 1955), "Sacrilege at St. Margaret's", The Spectator, pp. 14–16
- John Foxe (1570). Actes and monuments of these latter and perillous dayes. Vol. 11. pp. 1785–1788.
- Henry Machin. The Diary of Henry Machyn. pp. 84–85.
