= William Pikes =

William Pikes (c. 1520-14 July 1558) (also William Pickesse, Wyl Pyckes) was an English tanner in Ipswich, Suffolk who was arrested in Islington during the Marian persecutions as a member of a group studying the Bible in English. He was burnt at the stake in Brentford and is commemorated as one of the Ipswich Martyrs.

== William Pyckes ==
He was a tanner, and lived in the parish of St Margaret's Ipswich, which occupies the area directly to the north of the town centre, outside the medieval earth rampart. The church of St Margaret's stands adjacent to Christchurch Mansion and Park, which was built during Wyl Pyckes' lifetime. The Mansion stood on the site of the former Holy Trinity Priory, one of the two houses of Augustinian canons in the town, which was dissolved and became the property of Sir Thomas Pope (friend of Thomas More, Wolsey's successor as Chancellor), before being demolished to make way for the new brick mansion built by Edmund Withypoll.

The christenings and deaths of the children of Wyl Pyckes are recorded in the register of St Margaret's Church, between 1541 and 1558. He may therefore have been born around 1520. He was a believer in the reformed faith, and was of a hospitable disposition, generous toward the poor, and often opened his doors to give comfort to those who were hunted for their beliefs. He had absented himself from public worship for three years, following the accession of Queen Mary, since the Roman Mass was contrary to his conscience. His name appears in a list of dissenting persons of St Margaret's, drawn up on 18 May 1556, entitled A complaint against such as favoured the Gospell in Ipswich, exhibited to Queene Marie's Counsaile. Pyckes was a diligent student of the Bible, and possessed a copy of the Matthew Bible, containing the translations of Tyndale and Coverdale, which, although bearing King Henry VIII's royal licence, had since been suppressed and became a forbidden book.

== A presentiment of death ==
Shortly after Midsummer 1556, Wyl Pyckes was sitting in his garden, facing south, with the Bible open upon his knee. "Suddenly fell down upon his book, between eleven and twelve o'clock of the day, four drops of fresh blood, and he knew not from whence it came. Then he, seeing the same, was sore astonished, and could by no means learn from whence it should fall; and wiping out one of the drops with his finger, he called his wife and said, 'In the virtue of God, wife, what meaneth this? Will the Lord have four sacrifices? I see well enough the Lord will have blood. His will be done, and give me grace to abide the trial! Wife, let us pray, for I fear the day draweth nigh.'"

== The meeting at Islington ==
A few days after this, he went up to London to take part in a meeting with some forty men and women who met together for prayer and Bible study. This took place in a back close, 'in the field by the town of Islington', the chosen place being a walled garden so that they would not be discovered but a man looked over the wall and eventually greeted them, saying that 'they looked like men that meant no hurt.' One of their company then asked his permission for them to stay there, thinking perhaps he was the owner, and he repeated the same words and went away. They resumed their readings, and suddenly the Constable of Islington appeared among them, with six or seven other men, armed, and demanded that their books should be handed over.

== Arrest, imprisonment and inquisition ==
Various people, including the women present, escaped either from the close, or from the company as they were led away to the brew-house nearby but the men were divided into groups and taken away among the soldiers. Twenty-seven were taken before Sir Roger Cholmley, and their names were demanded. Twenty-two willingly gave their names, and were immediately taken to the Newgate. They went with their captors meekly, though it would not have been difficult to escape if they had wished. At first they were offered the opportunity to be released from the Newgate if they would hear a Mass. Those who remained obstinate were then presented an inquisition of fourteen articles, by Edmund Bonner, to which they were required to make satisfactory answers or be condemned.

== Executions ==
Of the twenty-two who had given their names, thirteen remained constant to their principles and held out against the demands. They were condemned to die, and were executed in two separate groups. The first group, of seven, consisted of Henry Pond (or Houde), Reinald Eastland (or Launder), Robert Southain/Southam, Matthew Ricarby/Ricarbie, John Floyd/Flood, John Holiday/Hollyday and Roger Holland, and were burnt at Smithfield on 27 June 1558. Roger Holland embraced the stake and the bundles of reeds for the fire, making the following prayer:

"Lord, I most humbly thank Thy Majesty that Thou hast called me from the state of death, unto the Light of Thy Heavenly Word, and now unto the fellowship of Thy saints that I may sing and say, 'Holy holy holy, Lord God of hosts!' And Lord, into Thy hands I commit my spirit. Lord bless these Thy people, and save them from idolatry."

And so, praying and praising God with his eyes raised to heaven, he ended his life.

The second group, of six, consisted of Robert Mills, Stephen Cotton, Robert Dynes, Stephen Wight (or Wreight), John Slade and William Pikes (or Pikas/Peckes), and suffered in a similar way at Brentford on 14 July 1558. Pikes prayed for 'grace to abide the trial', and animated by his faith he approached the stake 'joyfully'.

== Sources ==
- John Foxe, Booke of Martyrs
- N.F. Layard, Seventeen Suffolk Martyrs (Smiths, Ipswich 1903)
