= Lewes Martyrs =

Protestants burned at the stake (1555–1557)

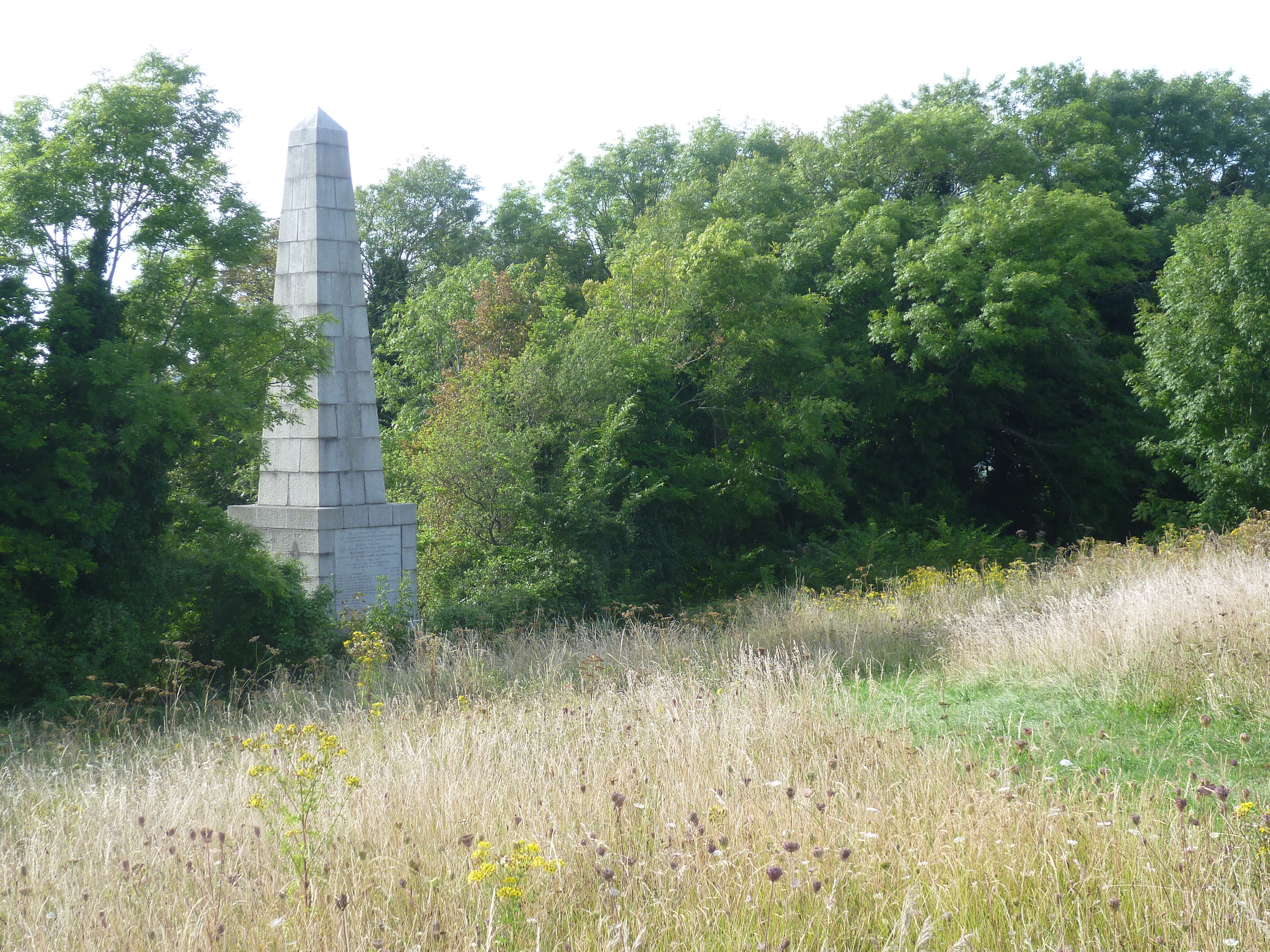
The Martyrs' Memorial obelisk on Cliffe Hill, Lewes

The Lewes Martyrs were 17 Protestants who were burned at the stake in Lewes, Sussex, England, between 1555 and 1557. These executions were part of the Marian persecutions of Protestants during the reign of Mary I.

On 6 June 1556, Thomas Harland of Woodmancote, near Henfield, Sussex, carpenter, John Oswald (or Oseward) of Woodmancote, husbandman, Thomas Reed of Ardingly, Sussex, and Thomas Avington (or Euington) of Ardingly, Sussex, turner, were burnt.

Richard Woodman and nine other people were burned together in Lewes on 22 June 1557, on the orders of Edmund Bonner, Bishop of London — the largest single bonfire of people that ever took place in England. The ten of them had not been kept in the town gaol before they were executed but in an undercroft of the Star Inn. The Star Inn became Lewes Town Hall and the undercroft still exists.

Together with the Gunpowder Plot, the Lewes Martyrs are commemorated annually on or around 5 November by the Bonfire Societies of Lewes and surrounding towns and villages, including Lewes Bonfire.

== See also ==
- Dirick Carver
- History of Christianity in Sussex
