= William Hunter (martyr) =

Marian martyr (d. 1555)

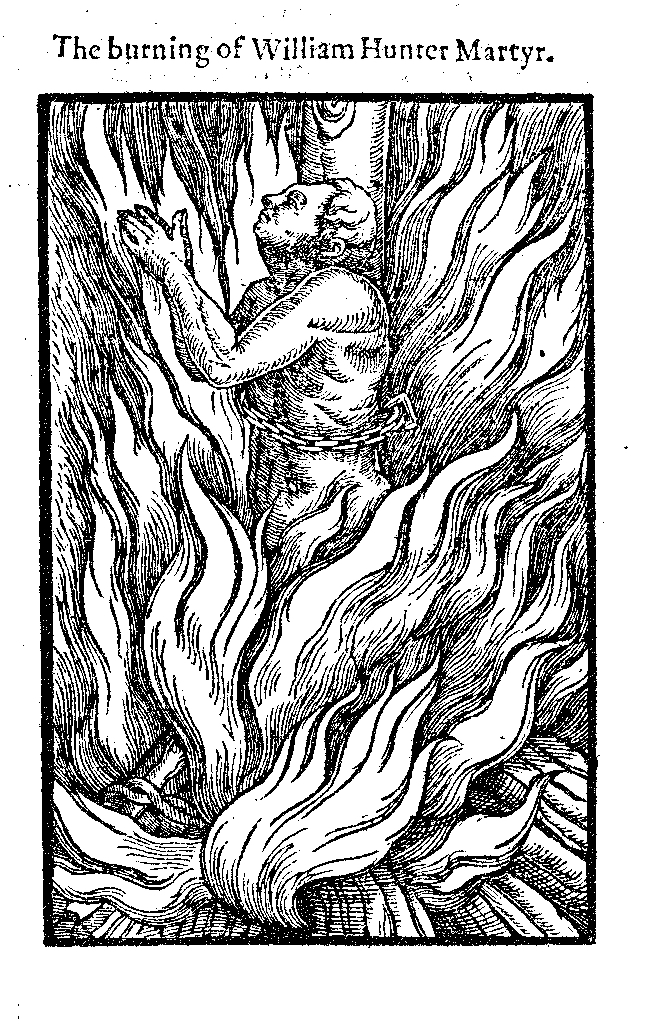
The burning of William Hunter as depcited in an edition of Foxe's Book of Martyrs

William Hunter was a Marian martyr burnt to death in Brentwood, England at the age of 19 on 26 March 1555, on Ingrave Road. He had lost his job in London as a silk-weaver because he refused to attend the Catholic mass, despite an order that everyone in the City of London had to attend, and had come to live with his parents in Brentwood, but got into a dispute when discovered reading the Bible for himself in Brentwood Chapel. He refused to accept the Catholic dogma of transubstantiation according to which the bread and wine of the communion become the body and blood of Jesus.

He was taken before Antony Browne, then the local Justice, but later Chief Justice of the Common Pleas, but refused to retract his position. Hunter was then sent to Bishop Bonner in London. He resisted both threats and bribes—Bonner offered to make him a Freeman of the City of London and give him £40—and was eventually returned to Brentwood to be burnt. He was the first Essex martyr of the reign of Mary Tudor.

== Legacy ==
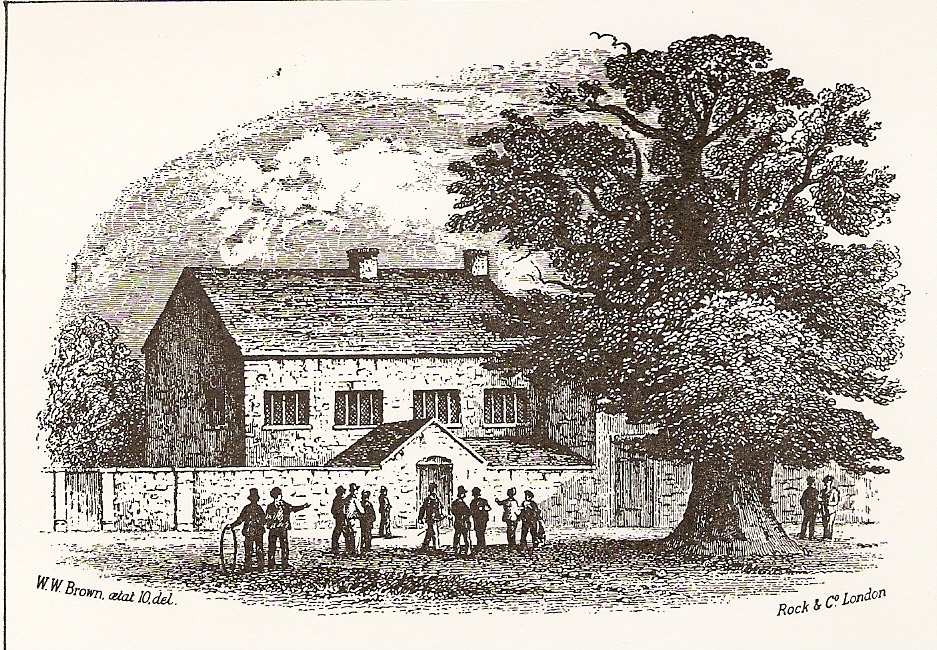
Brentwood School and the Martyr's Elm, 1847. The Elm was planted on the spot where Hunter was incinerated.

The site is now Brentwood School, which was founded by Antony Browne in 1558, under a grant from Queen Mary (not, as some believe, as a penance when Queen Elizabeth I came to the throne). The Martyr's Elm was grown on the spot of Hunter's incineration.

The site is marked by a plaque with the inscription

WILLIAM HUNTER. MARTYR. Committed to the Flames March 26th MDLV.
Christian Reader, learn from his example to value the privilege of an open Bible. And be careful to maintain it.

William Hunter Way, a road in Brentwood, was named after him.
