= Dirick Carver =

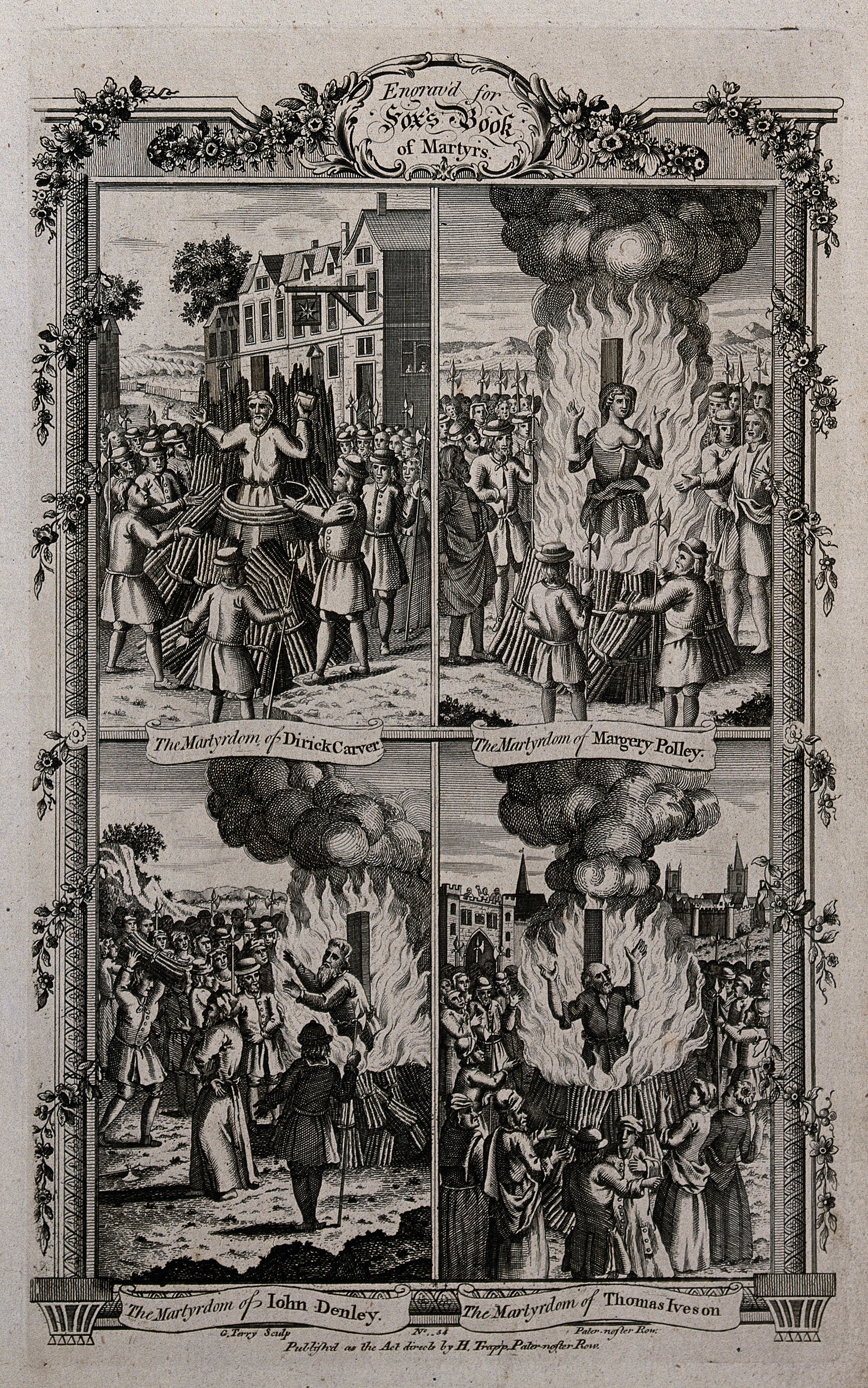
The martyrdom of Dirick Carver (top left), depicted by Garnet Terry for an edition of Foxe's Book of Martyrs

Dirick Carver was a Marian Martyr from Brighton, Sussex, England, who was burnt to death at Lewes on 22 July 1555.

In 1548, Carver, a French-speaking Flemish man from a town near Liège, sought refuge in Brighton from the persecution he was experiencing from the ruling powers of the time in respect of his Calvinist beliefs. He had been a lay reader as well as establishing Brighton's first brewery, the Black Lion. He held Bible reading sessions at his house in Brighton for the next few years until Roman Catholicism was restored as Britain's state religion by Queen Mary I in 1553. Meetings of Protestants were banned, and Carver was arrested and committed to trial in London for continuing to hold them. He was burnt at the stake in 1555.

He was one of the Lewes Martyrs, a group of 17 Protestants who were burned at the stake in Lewes, between 1555 and 1557. These martyrdoms were part of the persecution of Protestants during the reign of Mary Tudor.
