= Stephen Knight (martyr) =

English Protestant martyr

Stephen Knight was a sixteenth-century English Protestant martyr. His story was recorded in Foxe's Book of Martyrs. For denying transubstantiation, he was burned to death at Maldon, Essex.
