= Robert Drake (martyr) =

Robert Drake(s) (died 24 April 1556) was the Rector of The Parish of Thundersley, Essex. He was burned at the stake for his Protestant faith.

He was examined by the Bishop of Winchester who asked whether Drake would comply with the laws of England at the time (i.e. Roman Catholic). According to Foxe's Book of Martyrs he replied, “As for your church of Rome, I utterly defy and refuse it, with all the works thereof, even as I refuse the devil and all his works.” This was during the reign of Queen Mary I (1553 - 58), daughter of Henry VIII; she restored the Roman Catholic Church to her realm, persecuted Protestants as 'heretics', and earned the name of 'Bloody Mary.'...."

In recent years the martyrdom of Revd. Robert Drake has been commemorated at St Peter's Church, Thundersley, the principal church of the Parish of Thundersley, on or near to 24 April each year. The Robert Drake School is a quarter of a mile west of St. Peters on Church Road.
