= Bartholomew Green (martyr) =

English Protestant martyr (1530–1556)

Bartholomew or Bartlet Green (1530–27 January 1556), was an English Protestant.

Green was born in the parish of Basinghall, city of London. He was of a wealthy Roman Catholic family, and at the age of sixteen was sent by his parents, 'who favoured learning,' to the University of Oxford, proceeding B.A. in 1547. At the university he was a laborious student, and was converted by Peter Martyr's lectures to the Protestant religion. On leaving Oxford Green entered the Inner Temple, and after a period of dissipation his earlier impressions revived, and he gave up his worldly amusements. His family were scandalised by his Protestantism, and his grandfather, Dr. Bartlet, offered him bribes to abandon it.

At Oxford Green had made friends with Christopher Goodman, and on Easter Sunday 1554 took the sacrament with him in London before Goodman went beyond the seas. A letter from Green to Goodman was intercepted in 1555, in which he told his correspondent 'The queen is not dead.' It was read before the Privy Council, and Green was thrown into the Tower of London on a charge of treason, which broke down. He was then examined on religious questions before Bishop Bonner in November 1555. He was again sent back to prison (to Newgate), but was re-examined (15 January 1555–6) before Bonner and John Feckenham and condemned to be burnt. John Foxe gives a detailed account of his martyrdom, and of the letters he wrote before his death. His character seems by all accounts to have been very amiable. A letter from one Careless to him when in prison addresses him as a 'meek and loving lamb of Christ.' He went cheerfully to the stake at Smithfield at 9 a.m. on 27 January. A priest (Thomas Whittle or Whitwell), three tradesmen (Thomas Brown, John Tudson and John Went or Winter or Hunt) and two women (Isobella Forster or Annis Foster and Joan Lushford or Jone Lashforde or Warne) were burnt with him.
