= Bartholomew Legate =

English anti-trinitarian martyr

- Born: c. 1575; Essex, England
- Died: 18 March 1612; Smithfield, London, England
- Occupation: Minister

Bartholomew Legate (c. 1575 – 18 March 1612) was an English anti-Trinitarian martyr.

Legate was born in Essex and became a dealer in cloth. In the 1590s, Bartholomew and his two brothers, Walter and Thomas, began preaching around the London area. Their unorthodox message rejected the Roman Catholic Church, the Church of England and their rituals. The brothers' views probably influenced the emergence of the Seekers.

Together with his brother Thomas, he was put in prison for heresy in 1611. Thomas died in Newgate Prison, London, but Bartholomew's imprisonment was not a rigorous one. James I argued with him, and on several occasions, he was brought before the Consistory court of London, but without any definite result. Eventually, after having threatened to bring an action for wrongful imprisonment, Legate was tried before a full Consistory Court in February 1612, was found guilty of blasphemous heresy, and was delivered to the secular authorities for punishment. Refusing to retract his opinions, he was burnt at the stake at Smithfield on 18 March 1612. Legate was the last person burned in London for his religious opinions, and died just three weeks before Edward Wightman, who was burned at Lichfield in April 1612, the last to suffer in this way in England.

Assessments include:

Both men emerge as the victims of a complex series of events: the king's desire to be seen as orthodox in the light of the Vorstius affair; the in-fighting for control of the ecclesiastical establishment on the elevation of George Abbot to the archbishopric of Canterbury; and the campaign of the emerging anti-Calvinist group around Bishop Richard Neile against puritans".

In the end, Legate "a man well-read in the scriptures, and of unblameable life, was charged with Socinian tenets, and with saying, that the Nicene and Athanasian Creeds did not contain a profession of the true Christian Faith".
