= John Rough =

John Rough (died 22 December 1557) was a Protestant martyr and leader of the London underground church. He was born in Scotland and died in England.

== Early life ==
Rough is said to have been born in 1510, but as he was incorporated in St. Leonard's College in the university of St. Andrews in 1521, he was probably born a few years earlier. He left his parents when about seventeen years of age, on account of having been deprived of some property to which he thought himself entitled, and entered the Dominican friary at Stirling. According to his own statement, his opposition to the papacy was aroused or confirmed by his two visits to Rome on Dominican business, when he saw ‘with his own eyes that the pope was anti-Christ,’ inasmuch as more reverence was given to him in the procession than to the sacrament.

== After the monastery ==
He acquired such a reputation as a reformist Catholic preacher that in 1543, after the arrest of Cardinal Beaton, the regent Arran procured a dispensation for him to leave the monastery so that he might become one of his chaplains. The entry in the treasurer's accounts for February 1543 of payment for a gown, doublet, hose, and bonnet for him as chaplain of the lord-governor, probably indicates the date when he first entered upon his duties. At their request the governor allowed him and Thomas Gwilliam (or Williams) to preach publicly against current errors and abuses. Both were very effective. Rough, although according to Knox ‘not so learned’ as Williams, was ‘yet more simple and vehement against all impiety’ The preaching roused the special indignation of the Franciscans, who, according to Knox, ‘rouped as they had been ravens, yea, rather they yelled like devils in hell “heresy ! heresy ! Gwilliam and Rough will carry the governor to the devil”’. On account of the advice, as is supposed, of John Hamilton, Abbot of Arbroath, and David Panter (afterwards bishop of Ross), who had arrived from France, they were both prohibited from preaching; and Rough took refuge in the wild districts of Kyle in Ayrshire, where he remained until after the murder of Cardinal Beaton in 1546. By this date he had broken completely with Catholicism. After the murder, Rough came to St. Andrews, and, besides acting as chaplain to the garrison in the castle, began to preach in the parish church. Here he met John Knox, whom in a sermon he publicly exhorted to undertake the office of a preacher; and Knox, who had been a disciple of George Wishart, and who at this time had brought the aid of his vigorous pen to the support of the teaching of Rough in opposition to Dean Annand of St. Andrews, was at last induced to preach in the parish church his first sermon against the ‘corruptions of the Papistry’. Knox's irregular call was approved by the congregation. Knox and Rough were soon summoned before John Winram, the Catholic vicar-general of St. Andrews, but their defence was conducted by Knox with such skill as completely to confound their adversaries.

== In England ==
Rough managed to leave for England before the surrender of St. Andrews castle in July 1547, thus escaping being taken prisoner by the French. He went first to Carlisle and thence to the lord-protector Somerset, who assigned him a stipend of £20 sterling, and appointed him to preach at Carlisle, Berwick, and Newcastle. After his ‘marriage to a countrywoman of his,’ he was appointed by Robert Holgate, Archbishop of York, to a benefice near Hull, where he ministered until the death of Edward VI in 1553, when he fled with his wife to Norden in Friesland. There he and his wife maintained themselves by knitting caps, stockings, and other hosiery. Having on 10 November 1557 come to London to buy some yarn for his business, he was induced to become minister of the underground church, a secret congregation of protestants who used the 1552 Prayer Book.

== Arrest, trial and execution ==
His ministry was not, however, of long duration, because the underground church was infiltrated by a Catholic spy, the tailor Roger Sergeant. On Sergeant's information, Rough was arrested on 12 December, along with other members including the deacon Cutbert Symson, at the Saracen's Head, Islington, where the congregation was meeting. After examination before the privy council on 15 December, Rough was sent a prisoner to Newgate, and a letter was also sent by the council, together with the minutes of his examination, to Edmund Bonner, Bishop of London, requiring him to proceed against Rough. From Newgate Rough wrote two letters to his friends.

Rough excommunicated Margaret Mearing on suspicion of being the spy, because she had repeatedly brought strangers to church with her. Foxe says she ‘did not well take it, nor in good part’, and yet when none of Rough’s friends was allowed to visit him, she pretended to be his sister and took him a clean shirt. She went to Sergeant’s house and berated him as Judas, and was herself arrested days later.

After long examinations on doctrinal matters on 18 and 19 December, during which he was physically assaulted by an enraged Bonner, Rough was on 20 December brought into the consistory and condemned to death. Two days later he was burned at Smithfield along with Mearing. Rough was survived by his wife and their two-year-old daughter, Rachel.

== Sources ==
- Calderwood, David (1842). Thomson, Thomas (ed.). The history of the Kirk of Scotland. Vol. I. Edinburgh: Wodrow Society.
- Foxe, John (1583). Foxe's Book of Martyrs. Vol. 12. p. 2054.
- Knox, John (1846). Laing, David (ed.). The works of John Knox. Vol. 1. Edinburgh: Bannatyne Club.

This article incorporates text from a publication now in the public domain: Henderson, Thomas Finlayson (1897). "Rough, John". In Lee, Sidney (ed.). Dictionary of National Biography. Vol. 49. London: Smith, Elder & Co. p. 313.
