= Patrick Pakingham =

English fellmonger

Patrick Pakenham (Packingham, Pakingham) was an English fellmonger who was burned to death at Uxbridge in August 1555 because he refused to recant his Arian beliefs. He is mentioned in John Foxe's Acts and Monuments in the proceedings of Edmund Bonner against John Denley and another.
