= John Cardmaker =

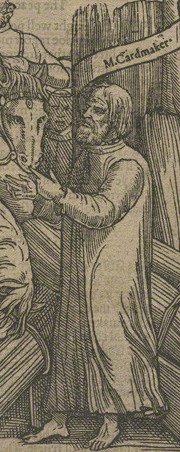
- Born: c. 1496
- Died: 1555; Smithfield
- Occupation: Clergyman

John Cardmaker (alias Taylor) (c. 1496–1555) was an English Protestant martyr.

== Franciscan and preacher ==
[1 September 1549] This same day Cardmaker sayd opynly in hys lector in Powlles that if God ware a man he was a vi. or vii. foote of lengthe, with the bredth, and if it be soo how canne it be that he shuld be in a pesse of brede in a rownde cake on the awter: what an ironyos oppynyone is this unto the leye pepulle!

— Chronicle of the Grey Friars of London, 1852

He was originally an Observant friar, who, after the dissolution of his order under the persecution which Henry VIII specially directed against it, lapsed into the world, and became a married minister. His name is found in the list of licensed preachers of Edward VI He was vicar of St. Bridget's in Fleet Street, and one of the readers or lecturers at St. Paul's, where he read three times a week. Some of his sayings against Bishops Stephen Gardiner and Edmund Bonner, and concerning the sacrament, are preserved, On Somerset's first fall, when a religious reaction was vainly expected, he spoke strongly in his lecture against the victorious faction of Warwick. 'Cardmaker said in his lecture that, though he had a fall, he was not undone, and that men should not have their purposes; and also he said that men would have set up again their popish mass'. Soon after this he was made prebendary and chancellor of Wells, where he ejected a schoolmaster, preached and lectured often, and shared the troubles of the new appointed dean, William Turner

== Reign of Mary I ==
When the persecution broke out under Mary, Cardmaker and his bishop, William Barlow of Bath and Walls, came to London disguised as merchants, and vainly attempted to escape over sea, November 1554. They were cast into the Fleet Prison, where they lay till January, when the chancellor Gardiner, and others in commission, began to have the accumulated prisoners for religion, who amounted to about eighty, brought before them at St. Mary's Overy. Barlow submitted and escaped. Cardmaker, who was examined on the same day (28 January) as John Hooper and Edward Crome, was understood also to have recanted, and was remanded to the Compter in Bread Street, with the prospect of speedy deliverance. But his compliances were only, as he himself said, 'by a policy'. He was reanimated, it was thought, in his new prison by the zeal of Laurence Saunders, his fellow-captive, and a second inquiry was made into his opinions. He was brought before Bonner on 26 May 1555, examined in several articles, cast for heresy, and committed to Newgate Prison, whence he was carried to Smithfield on 30 May and burnt alive in the company of one Warne, an upholsterer.
