= Thomas Tomkins (martyr) =

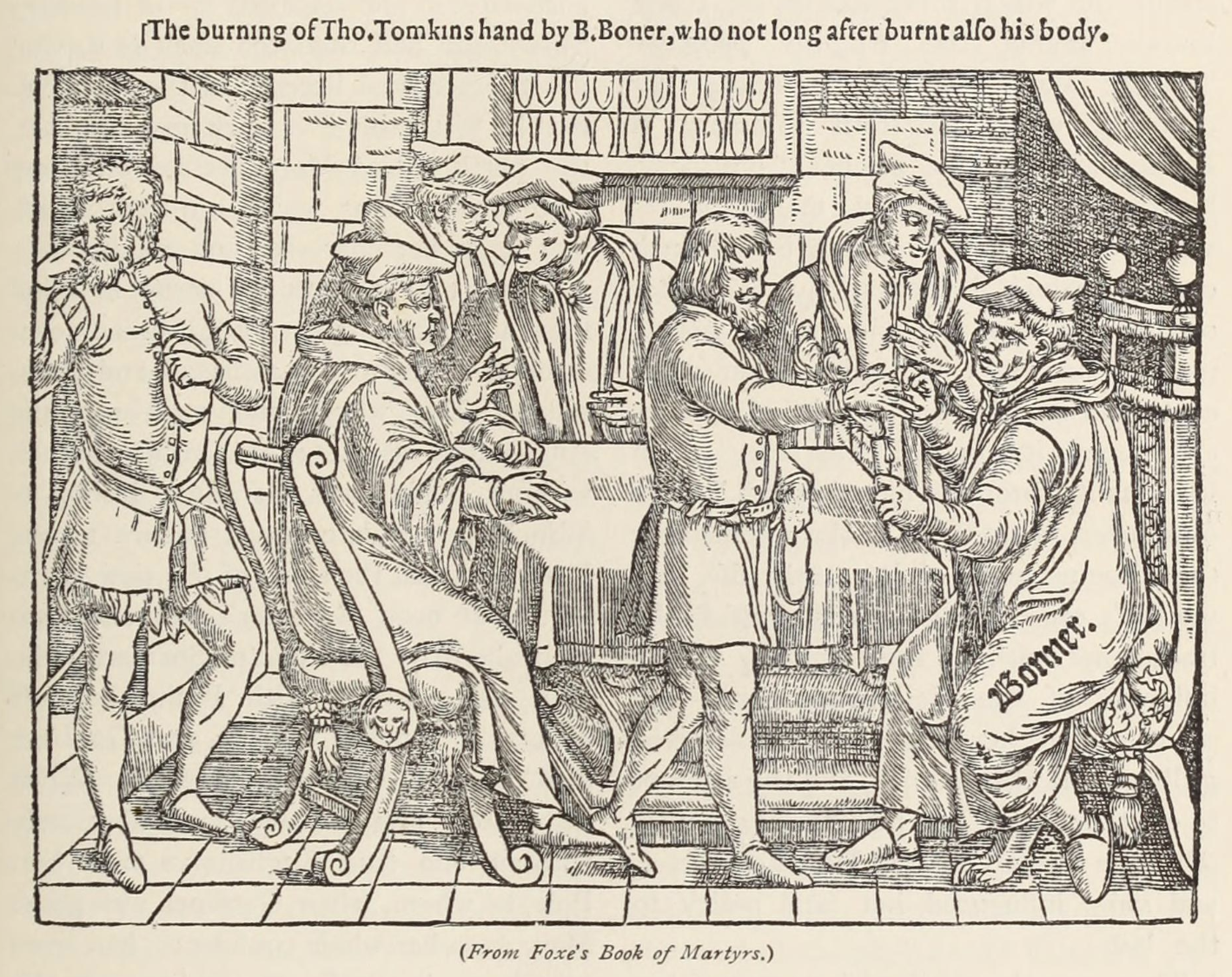
Burning of Thomas Tomkins by Bishop Bonner (Foxe's Book of Martyrs, 1563)

Thomas Tomkins (died 16 March 1555) was a 16th-century English Protestant martyr. He was a weaver from Shoreditch, London, and was examined by Bishop Bonner. Despite having been subjected to torture, he insisted that he did not believe in transubstantiation. As a result, he was burned to death at Smithfield on 16 March 1555. His story is recorded in Foxe's Book of Martyrs.
