= John Lawrence (martyr) =

English Protestant martyr

John Lawrence was a sixteenth-century English Protestant martyr. His story was recorded in Foxe's Book of Martyrs.

He was executed in Colchester, Essex; he apparently had to be taken to the stake in a chair because the irons he had been kept in while imprisoned, coupled with the lack of food, had left him too weak to walk.
