= Smithfield, London =

District of central London

Coordinates: 51.519°N 0.102°W

Smithfield
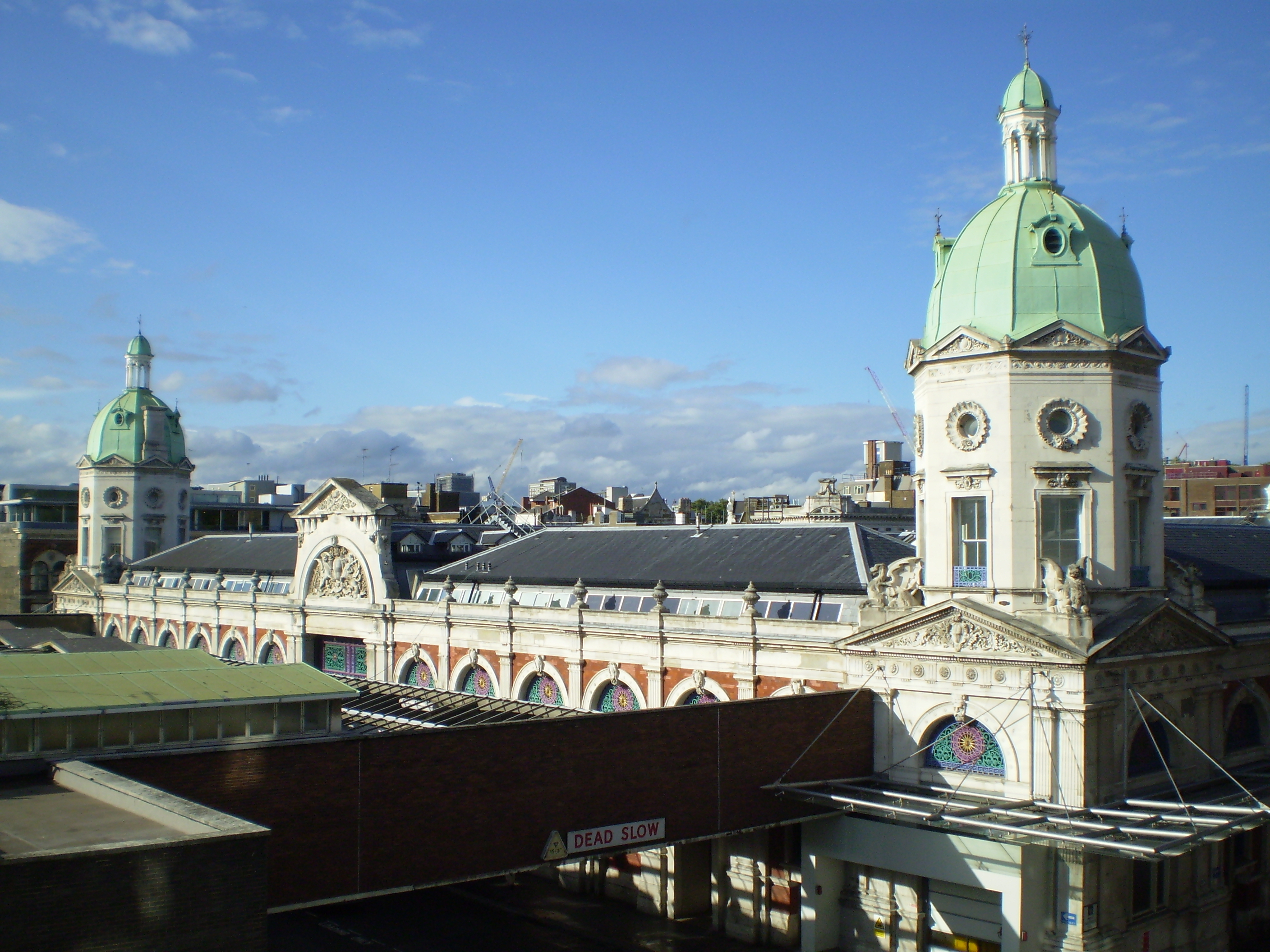
- Smithfield Meat Market

- Location within Greater London
- Sui generis: City of London
- Administrative area: Greater London
- Region: London
- Country: England
- Sovereign state: United Kingdom
- Post town: London
- Postcode district: EC1
- Dialling code: 020
- Police: City of London
- Fire: London
- Ambulance: London
- UK Parliament: Cities of London and Westminster
- London Assembly: City and East

City of London coat of arms

Smithfield, properly known as West Smithfield, is a district located in Central London, part of Farringdon Without, the most westerly ward of the City of London, England.

Smithfield is home to a number of City institutions, such as St Bartholomew's Hospital and livery halls, including those of the Butchers' and Haberdashers' Companies. The area is best known for the Smithfield meat market, which dates from the 10th century, has been in continuous operation since medieval times, and is now London's only remaining wholesale market. Smithfield's principal street is called West Smithfield. Each summer, from the 12th century to the 19th century the area hosted Bartholomew Fair, and the area also contains the City's oldest surviving church building, St Bartholomew-the-Great, dating from 1123 (most City churches were destroyed in the Great Fire of 1666).

The area is located just beyond the New Gate and formerly its prison which held condemned prisoners. In former centuries, especially prior to the establishment of Tyburn, the area bore witness to many executions of heretics and political rebels, as well as Scottish knight Sir William Wallace, and Wat Tyler, leader of the Peasants' Revolt, among many other religious reformers and dissenters (later on, public executions were generally moved out to Tyburn, until being moved back to the prison).

The present Smithfield Market, a Grade II listed-covered market building, was designed by Victorian architect Sir Horace Jones in the second half of the 19th century, and is the dominant architectural feature of the area. Some of its original market premises fell into disuse in the late 20th century and faced the prospect of demolition. The Corporation of London's public enquiry in 2012 drew widespread support for an urban regeneration plan intent upon preserving Smithfield's historical identity.

== Smithfield area ==
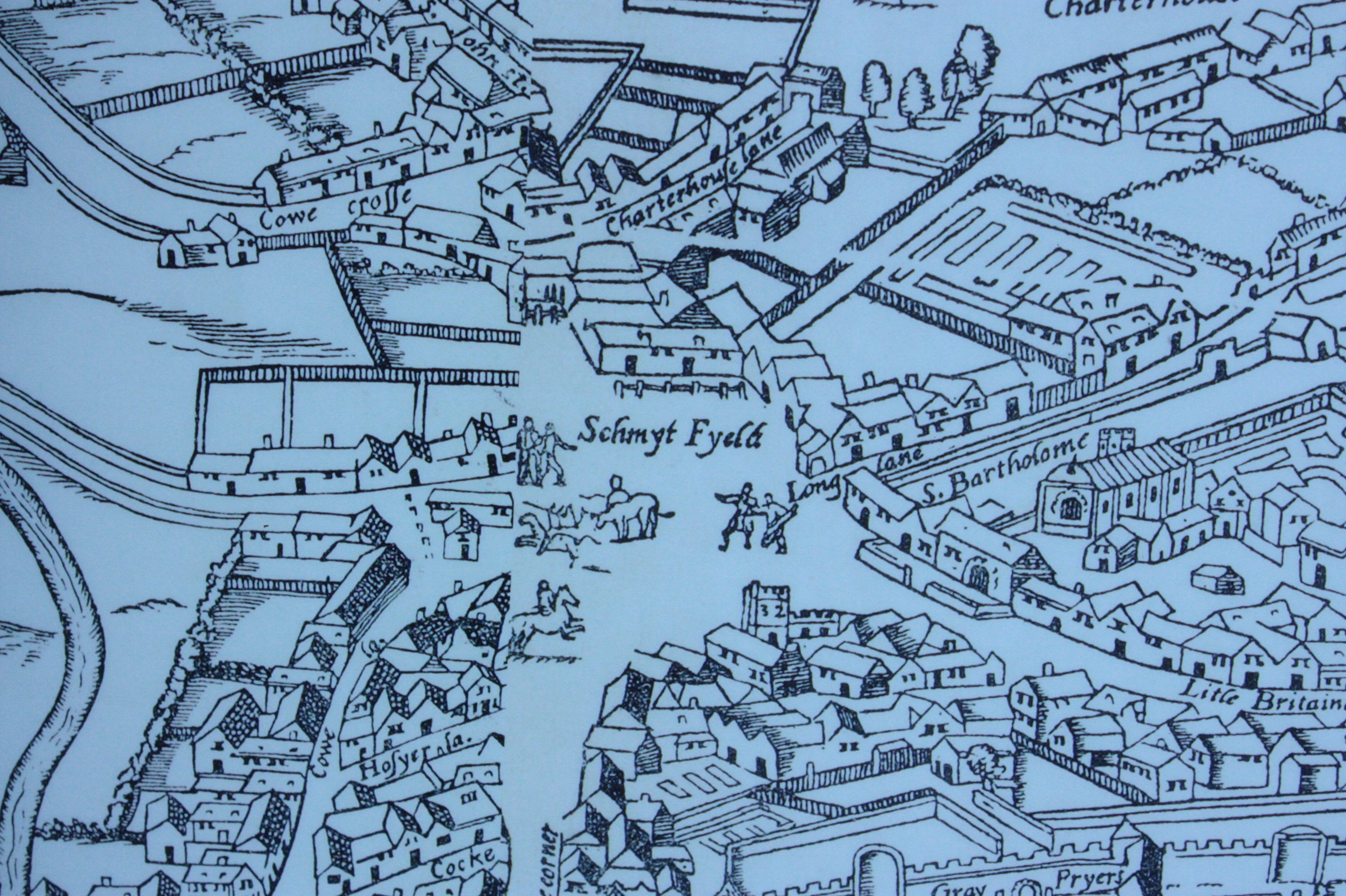
Smithfield from the "woodcut" map of c. 1561, illustrating its proximity with open fields to the west, and cattle pens by the City

In the Middle Ages, it was a broad grassy area known as Smooth Field, located beyond London Wall and stretching to the eastern bank of the River Fleet. Given its ease of access to grazing and water, Smithfield established itself as London's livestock market, remaining so for almost 1,000 years. Many local toponyms are associated with the livestock trade: while some street names (such as "Cow Cross Street" and "Cock Lane") remain in use, many more (such as "Chick Lane", "Duck Lane", "Cow Lane", "Pheasant Court", "Goose Alley") have disappeared from the map after the major redevelopment of the area in the Victorian era.

=== Religious history ===
In 1123, the area near Aldersgate was granted by King Henry I for the foundation of St Bartholomew's Priory at the request of Prior Rahere, in thanks for his being nursed back to good health. The Priory exercised its right to enclose land between the vicinity of the boundary with Aldersgate Without (to the east), Long Lane (to the north) and modern-day Newgate Street (to the south), erecting its main western gate which opened onto Smithfield, and a postern on Long Lane. By facing the open space of Smithfield and by having 'its back to' the buildings lining Aldersgate Street, the Priory site has left a continuing legacy of limited connectivity between the Smithfield area and Aldersgate Street.

The Priory thereafter held the manorial rights to hold weekly fairs, which initially took place in its outer court on the site of present-day Cloth Fair, leading to "Fair Gate".

An additional annual celebration, the Bartholomew Fair, was established in 1133 by the Augustinian canons. Over time, this became one of London's pre-eminent summer fairs, opening each year on 24 August. A trading event for cloth and other goods as well as being a pleasure forum, the four-day festival drew crowds from all strata of English society.

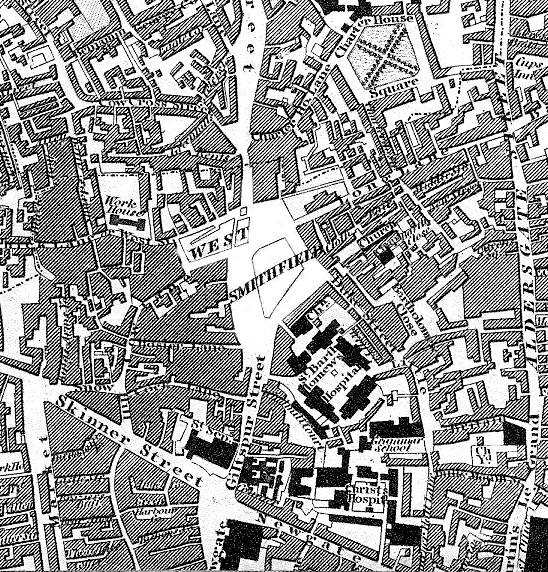
Smithfield in 1827, from John Greenwood's map of London

In 1855, however, the City authorities closed Bartholomew Fair as they considered it to have degenerated into a magnet for debauchery and public disorder.

In 1348, Walter de Manny rented 13 acres (0.05 km^{2}) of land at Spital Croft, north of Long Lane, from the Master and Brethren of St Bartholomew's Hospital, for a graveyard and plague pit for victims of the Black Death. A chapel and hermitage were constructed, renamed New Church Haw; but in 1371, this land was granted for the foundation of the Charterhouse, originally a Carthusian monastery.

Nearby and to the north of this demesne, the Knights Hospitaller established a Commandery at Clerkenwell, dedicated to St John in the mid-12th century. In 1194 they received a Charter from King Richard I granting the Order formal privileges. Later Augustinian canonesses established the Priory of St Mary, north of the Knights of St John property.

By the end of the 14th century, these religious houses were regarded by City traders as interlopers – occupying what had previously been public open space near one of the City gates. On numerous occasions vandals damaged the Charterhouse, eventually demolishing its buildings. By 1405, a stout wall was built to protect the property and maintain the privacy of the Order, particularly its church where men and women alike came to worship.

The religious houses were dissolved in the Reformation, and their lands broken up. The Priory Church of St John remains, as does St John's Gate. John Houghton (later canonized by Pope Paul VI as St John Houghton), The prior of Charterhouse went to Thomas Cromwell, accompanied by two other local priors, seeking an oath of supremacy that would be acceptable to their communities. Instead they were imprisoned in the Tower of London, and on 4 May 1535, they were taken to Tyburn and hanged – becoming the first Catholic martyrs of the Reformation. On 29 May, the remaining twenty monks and eighteen lay brothers were forced to swear the oath of allegiance to King Henry VIII; the ten who refused were taken to Newgate Prison and left to starve.

With the monks expelled, Charterhouse was requisitioned and remained as a private dwelling until its reestablishment by Thomas Sutton in 1611 as a charitable foundation; it was the basis of the school named Charterhouse and almshouses known as Sutton's Hospital in Charterhouse on its former site. The school was relocated to Godalming in 1872. Until 1899 Charterhouse was extra-parochial; that year it became a civil parish incorporated in the Metropolitan Borough of Finsbury. Some of the property was damaged during The Blitz, but it remains largely intact. Part of the site is now occupied by Barts and The London School of Medicine and Dentistry.

From its inception, the Priory of St Bartholomew treated the sick. After the Reformation it was left with neither income nor monastic occupants but, following a petition by the City Corporation, Henry VIII refounded it in December 1546, as the "House of the Poore in West Smithfield in the suburbs of the City of London of Henry VIII's Foundation". Letters Patent were presented to the City, granting property and income to the new foundation the following month. King Henry VIII's sergeant-surgeon, Thomas Vicary, was appointed as the hospital's first superintendent. The King Henry VIII Gate, which opens onto West Smithfield, was completed in 1702 and remains the hospital's main entrance.

The Priory's principal church, St Bartholomew-the-Great, was reconfigured after the dissolution of the monasteries, losing almost all of its nave. Reformed as an Anglican parish church, its parish boundaries were limited to the site of the ancient priory and a small tract of land between the church and Long Lane. The parish of St Bartholomew the Great was designated as a Liberty, responsible for the upkeep and security of its fabric and the land within its boundaries. With the advent of street lighting, mains water, and sewerage during the Victorian era, maintenance of such an ancient parish with so few parishioners became increasingly uneconomical after the Industrial Revolution. In 1910, it agreed to be incorporated by the Corporation of London which guaranteed financial support and security. Great St Barts' present parish boundary includes just 10 feet (3.048 m) of Smithfield – possibly delineating a former right of way.

After the Reformation, a separate parish likewise dedicated to St Bartholomew was granted in favour of St Bartholomew's Hospital; named St Bartholomew-the-Less, it remained under the hospital's patronage, unique in the Church of England, until 1948, when the hospital was nationalized in the National Health Service. The church benefice has since been joined again with its ancient partner, the Priory Church of St Bartholomew the Great.

Following the diminished influence of the ancient Priory, predecessor of the two parishes of St Bartholomew, disputes began to arise over rights to tithes and taxes payable by lay residents who claimed allegiance with the nearby and anciently associated parish of St Botolph Aldersgate – an unintended consequence and legacy of King Henry VIII's religious reforms.

Smithfield and its market, situated mostly in the parish of St Sepulchre, was founded in 1137, and was endowed by Prior Rahere, who also founded St Barts. The ancient parish of St Sepulchre extended north to Turnmill Street, to St Paul's Cathedral and Ludgate Hill in the south, and along the east bank of the Fleet (now the route of Farringdon Street). St Sepulchre's Tower contains the twelve "bells of Old Bailey", referred to in the nursery rhyme "Oranges and Lemons". Traditionally, the Great Bell was rung to announce the execution of a prisoner at Newgate.

=== Civil history ===
As a large open space close to the City, Smithfield was a popular place for public gatherings. In 1374 Edward III held a seven-day tournament at Smithfield, for the amusement of his beloved Alice Perrers. Possibly the most famous medieval tournament at Smithfield was that commanded in 1390 by Richard II. Jean Froissart, in his fourth book of Chronicles, reported that sixty knights would come to London to tilt for two days, "accompanied by sixty noble ladies, richly ornamented and dressed". The tournament was proclaimed by heralds throughout England, Scotland, Hainault, Germany, Flanders and France, so as to rival the jousts given by Charles of France at Paris a few years earlier, upon the arrival of his consort Isabel of Bavaria. Geoffrey Chaucer supervised preparations for the tournament as a clerk to the King. It is told that, between 1389 and 1394, another large tournament was celebrated in the city which spawned the Portuguese legend of the Twelve of England, where twelve Portuguese knights were called to defend the honour of several ladies-in-waiting of John of Gaunt's wife Constance of Castile. At the time, John of Gaunt's daughter Philipa of Lancaster was married to John of Aviz, King of Portugal, lending credence to the story, although how much and which parts of it are true is still debated.

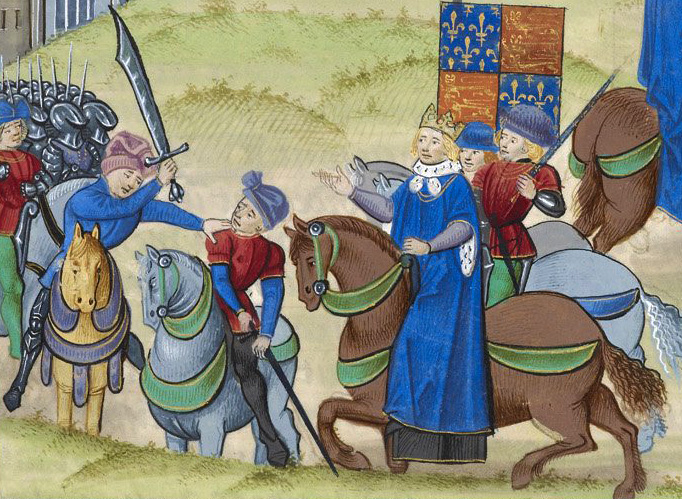
Depiction of Wat Tyler's demise by the hand of Sir William Walworth in the Peasants' Revolt of 1381, with Richard II watching at right

Along with Tyburn, Smithfield was for centuries the main site for the public execution of heretics and dissidents in London. The Scottish nobleman Sir William Wallace was executed in 1305 at West Smithfield. The market was the meeting place prior to the Peasants' Revolt and where the Revolt's leader, Wat Tyler, was slain by Sir William Walworth, Lord Mayor of London on 15 June 1381.

Religious dissenters (Catholics as well as other Protestant denominations such as Anabaptists) were sentenced to death in this area during the Crown's changing course of religious orientation started by King Henry VIII. About fifty Protestants and religious reformers, known as the Marian martyrs, were executed at Smithfield during the reign of Mary I.

G. K. Chesterton observed ironically:

It is foolish, generally speaking, for a philosopher to set fire to another philosopher in Smithfield Market because they do not agree in their theory of the universe. That was done very frequently in the last decadence of the Middle Ages, and it failed altogether in its object.

— Heretics 1905

On 17 November 1558, several Protestant heretics were saved by a royal herald's timely announcement that Queen Mary had died shortly before the wooden faggots were to be lit at the Smithfield Stake. Under English Law death warrants were commanded by Sign Manual (the personal signature of the Monarch), invariably upon ministerial recommendation, which if unexercised by the time of a Sovereign's death required renewed authority. In this case Queen Elizabeth did not approve the executions, thus freeing the Protestants. During the 16th century, the Smithfield site was also the place of execution of swindlers and coin forgers, who were boiled to death in oil.

By the 18th century, the "Tyburn Tree" (near the present-day Marble Arch) became the main place for public executions in London. After 1785, executions were again moved, this time to the gates of Newgate Prison, just to the south of Smithfield.

The Smithfield area emerged largely unscathed by the Great Fire of London in 1666, which was abated near the Fortune of War Tavern, at the junction of Giltspur Street and Cock Lane, where the statue of the Golden Boy of Pye Corner is located. In the late 17th century several residents of Smithfield emigrated to North America, where they founded the town of Smithfield, Rhode Island.

=== West Smithfield Bars ===
Until the 19th century, the area included boundary markers known as the West Smithfield Bars (or more simply, Smithfield Bars). These marked the northern boundary of the City of London and were placed at a point approximating to where modern Charterhouse Street meets St John Street, which was historically the first stretch of the Great North Road. The Bars were on the route of the former Fagswell Brook, a tributary of the Fleet, which marked the City's northern boundary in the area.

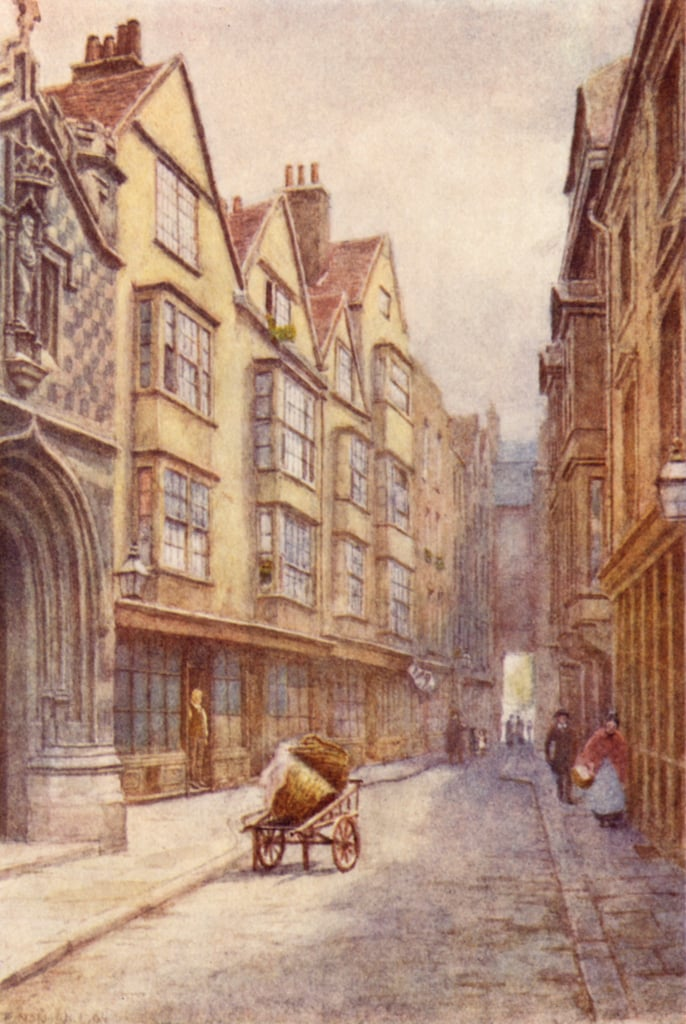
Cloth Fair, West Smithfield, looking West, 1904 by Philip Norman

The Bars are first documented in 1170 and 1197, and were a site of public executions.

=== Today ===
Since the late 1990s, Smithfield and neighbouring Farringdon have developed a reputation for being a cultural hub for up-and-coming professionals, who enjoy its bars, restaurants and nightclubs.

Nightclubs such as Fabric and Turnmills pioneered the area's reputation for trendy night life, attracting professionals from nearby Holborn, Clerkenwell and the City on weekdays. At weekends, the clubs and bars in the area, having late licences, draw people into the area from outside London too.

Smithfield has also become a venue for sporting events. Until 2002 Smithfield hosted the midnight start of the annual Miglia Quadrato car treasure hunt, but with the increased night club activity around Smithfield, the UHULMC (a motoring club) decided to move the event's start to Finsbury Circus. Since 2007, Smithfield has been the chosen site of an annual event dedicated to road bicycle racing known as the Smithfield Nocturne.

Number 1, West Smithfield is head office of the Churches Conservation Trust.

== Market ==
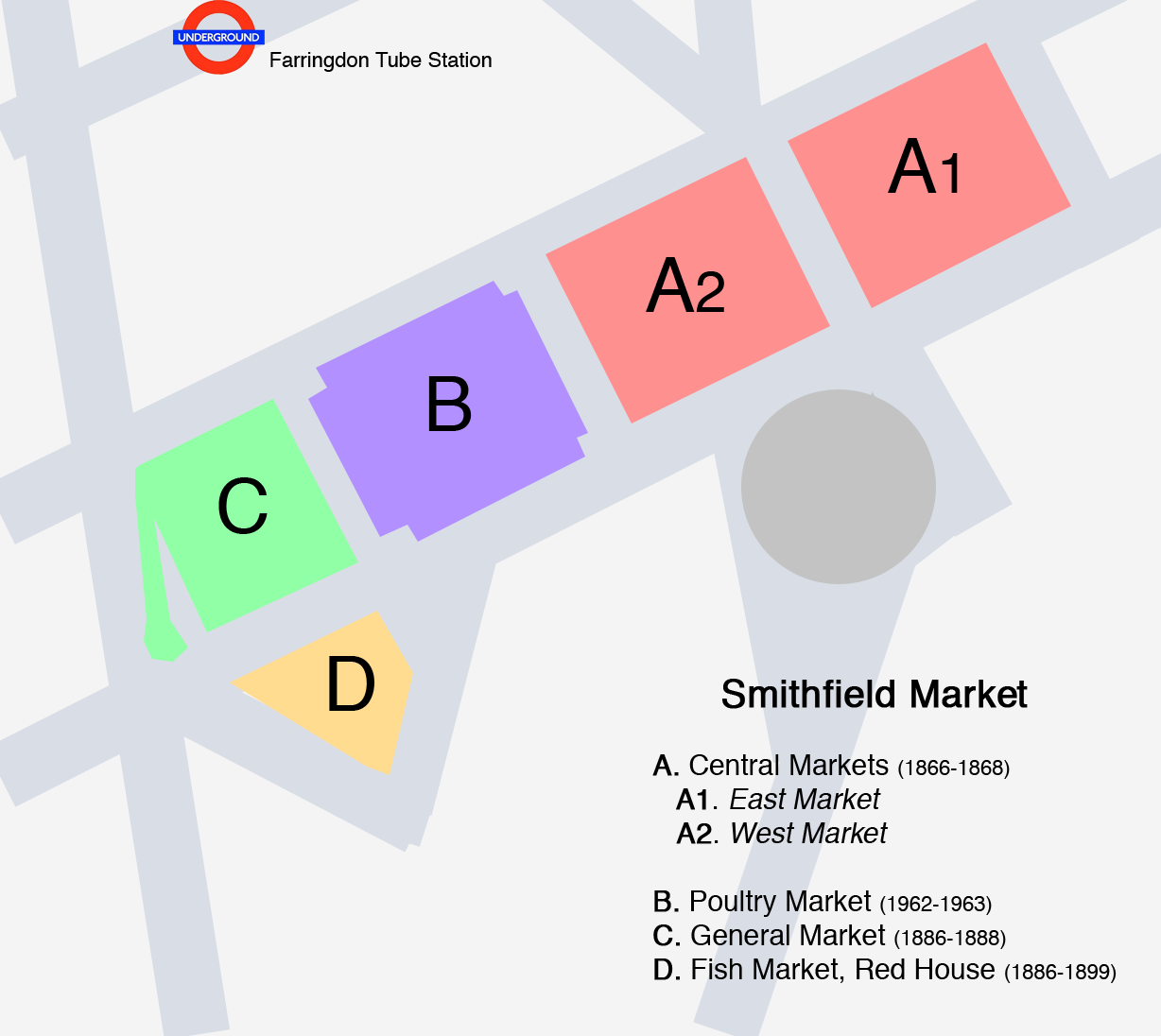
Map outlining Smithfield Market's main buildings

=== Origins ===
Meat has been traded at Smithfield Market for more than 800 years, making it one of the oldest markets in London. A livestock market occupied the site as early as the 10th century.

In 1174 the site was described by William Fitzstephen as:

a smooth field where every Friday there is a celebrated rendezvous of fine horses to be traded, and in another quarter are placed vendibles of the peasant, swine with their deep flanks, and cows and oxen of immense bulk.

Costs, customs and rules were meticulously laid down. For instance, for an ox, a cow or a dozen sheep one could get 1 penny. The livestock market expanded over the centuries to meet demand from the growing population of the City. In 1710, the market was surrounded by a wooden fence containing the livestock within the market. Until the market's abolition, the Gate House at Cloth Fair ("Fair Gate") employed a chain (le cheyne) on market days. Daniel Defoe referred to the livestock market in 1726 as being "without question, the greatest in the world", and data available appear to corroborate his statement.

Between 1740 and 1750 the average yearly sales at Smithfield were reported to be around 74,000 cattle and 570,000 sheep. By the middle of the 19th century, in the course of a single year 220,000 head of cattle and 1,500,000 sheep would be "violently forced into an area of five acres, in the very heart of London, through its narrowest and most crowded thoroughfares". The volume of cattle driven daily to Smithfield started to raise major concerns.

The Great North Road traditionally began at Smithfield Market, with St John Street and Islington High Street forming the initial stages. Road mileages were taken from Hicks Hall, a short distance up St John Street, some 90 metres north of the West Smithfield Bars. The site of the hall continued to be used as the starting point for mileages even after it was demolished soon after 1778. The road followed St John Street, and continued north, eventually leading to Edinburgh. Using the former site of the hall as the starting point ended in 1829, with the establishment of the General Post Office at St Martin's-le-Grand, which became the new starting point, with the route following Goswell Road before joining Islington High Street and then re-joining the historic route.

In modern days, the market was known for its Christmas Eve meat auction, where buyers thronged to buy surplus produce in cash-only bargain transactions.

=== Local campaigning against the cattle market ===
In the Victorian period, pamphlets started circulating in favour of the removal of the livestock market and its relocation outside of the City, due to its extremely poor hygienic conditions as well as the brutal treatment of the cattle. The conditions at the market in the first half of the 19th century were often described as a major threat to public health:

Of all the horrid abominations with which London has been cursed, there is not one that can come up to that disgusting place, West Smithfield Market, for cruelty, filth, effluvia, pestilence, impiety, horrid language, danger, disgusting and shuddering sights, and every obnoxious item that can be imagined; and this abomination is suffered to continue year after year, from generation to generation, in the very heart of the most Christian and most polished city in the world.

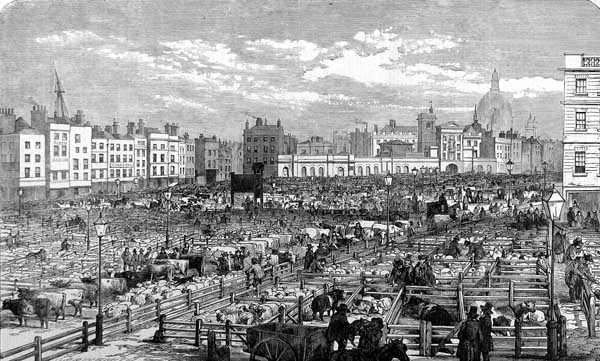
Old Smithfield in 1855, an outdoor market

In 1843, the Farmer's Magazine published a petition signed by bankers, salesmen, butchers, aldermen and City residents against further expansion of the meat market, arguing that livestock markets had been systematically banned since the Middle Ages in other areas of London:

Our ancestors appear, in sanitary matters, to have been wiser than we are. There exists, amongst the Rolls of Parliament of the year 1380, a petition from the citizens of London, praying that, for the sake of the public health, meat should not be slaughtered nearer than "Knyghts-brigg", under penalty, not only of forfeiting such animals as might be killed in the "butcherie", but of a year's imprisonment. The prayer of this petition was granted, and its penalties were enforced during several reigns.

Thomas Hood wrote in 1830 an Ode to the Advocates for the Removal of Smithfield Market, applauding those "philanthropic men" who aim at removing to a distance the "vile Zoology" of the market and "routing that great nest of Hornithology [sic]". Charles Dickens criticised locating a livestock market in the heart of the capital in his 1851 essay A Monument of French Folly drawing comparisons with the French market at Poissy outside Paris:

Of a great Institution like Smithfield, [the French] are unable to form the least conception. A Beast Market in the heart of Paris would be regarded an impossible nuisance. Nor have they any notion of slaughter-houses in the midst of a city. One of these benighted frog-eaters would scarcely understand your meaning, if you told him of the existence of such a British bulwark.

An act of Parliament, the Metropolitan Market Act 1851 (14 & 15 Vict. c. 61), was passed, under the provisions of which a new cattle market should be constructed at Copenhagen Fields, Islington. The Metropolitan Cattle Market opened in 1855, leaving West Smithfield as waste ground for about ten years during the construction of the new market.

=== Victorian Smithfield: meat and poultry market ===
Metropolitan Meat and Poultry Market Act 1860
- Act of Parliament
- Parliament of the United Kingdom
- Long title: An Act to establish at Smithfield in the City of London a Metropolitan Market for Meat, Poultry, and other Provisions; and for other Purposes connected therewith.
- Citation: 23 & 24 Vict. c. cxciii

Dates
- Royal assent: 13 August 1860
Other legislation
Amended by	Metropolitan Meat and Poultry Market (Borrowing) Act 1864

Text of statute as originally enacted

Metropolitan Meat and Poultry Market (Borrowing) Act 1864
- Act of Parliament
- Parliament of the United Kingdom
- Long title: An Act to amend the Metropolitan Meat and Poultry Market Act, 1860, and other Acts, with respect to the borrowing of Money; and for other Purposes.
- Citation: 27 & 28 Vict. c. xv

Dates
- Royal assent: 28 April 1864
Other legislation
Amends	Metropolitan Meat and Poultry Market Act 1860

London Central Markets Act 1886
- Act of Parliament
- Parliament of the United Kingdom
- Long title: An Act for empowering the Mayor and Commonalty and Citizens of the City of London to make further and better provisions with reference to the London Central Markets; and for other purposes.
- Citation: 49 & 50 Vict. c. viii

Dates
- Royal assent: 16 April 1886

Status: Amended

Text of statute as originally enacted

London Central Markets Act 1875
- Act of Parliament
- Parliament of the United Kingdom
- Long title: An Act for the establishment of a Fruit, Vegetable, and Flower Market in the City of London, and the extension of the Metropolitan Meat and Poultry Market there, and the abolition of Farringdon Market; and for other purposes.
- Citation: 38 & 39 Vict. c. lix

Dates
- Royal assent: 14 June 1875

Status: Amended

Text of statute as originally enacted

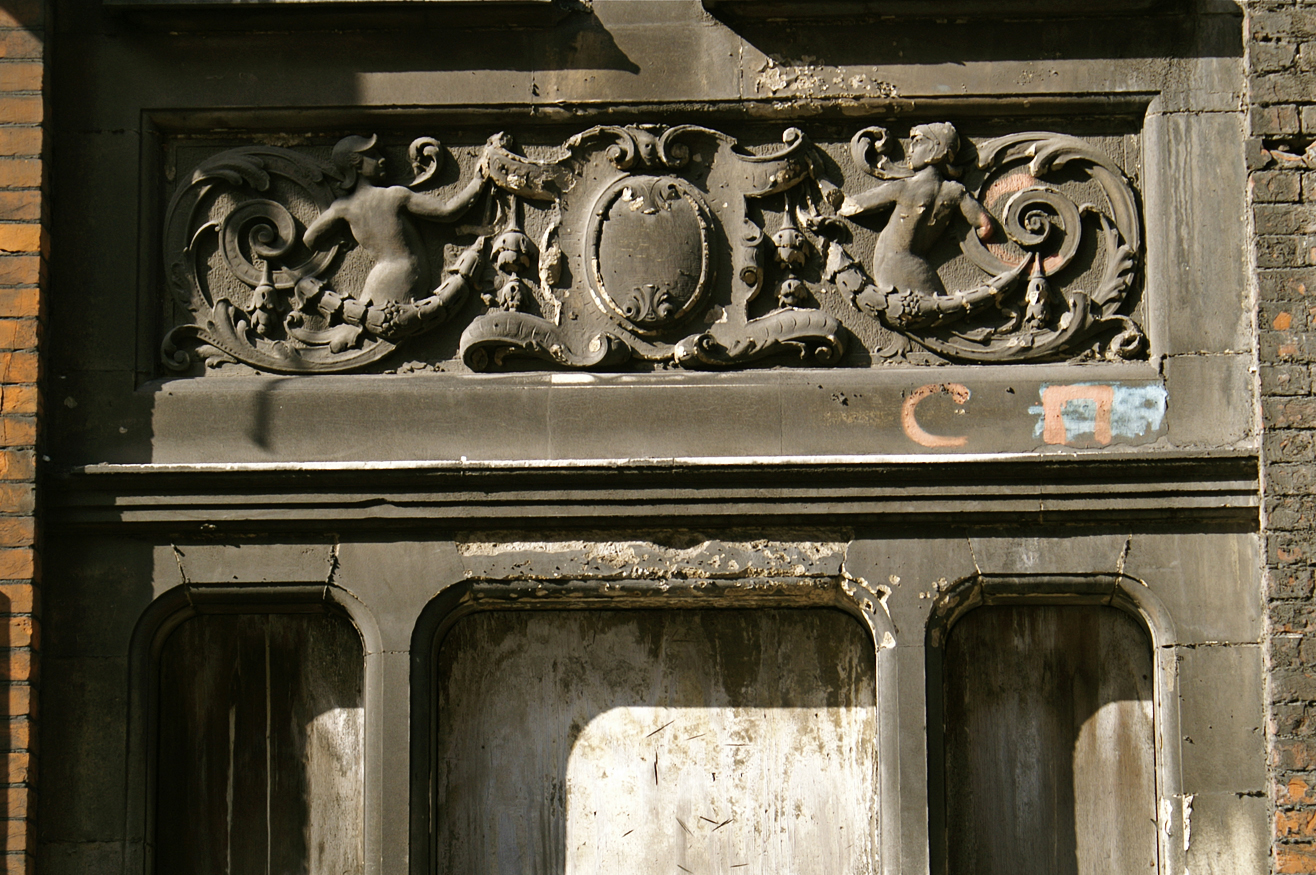
Dilapidated decorations at Smithfield.

The present Smithfield meat market on Charterhouse Street was established by act of Parliament, the Metropolitan Meat and Poultry Market Act 1860 (23 & 24 Vict. c. cxciii). It is a large market with permanent buildings, designed by architect Sir Horace Jones, who also designed Billingsgate and Leadenhall markets. Work on the Central Market, inspired by Italian architecture, began in 1866 and was completed in November 1868 at a cost of £993,816 (£97 million as of 2025).

The Grade II listed main wings (known as East and West Market) are separated by the Grand Avenue, a wide roadway roofed by an elliptical arch with decorations in cast iron. At the two ends of the arcade, four prominent statues represent London, Edinburgh, Liverpool and Dublin; they depict bronze dragons charged with the City's armorial bearings. At the corners of the market, four octagonal pavilion towers were built, each with a dome displaying carved stone griffins.

As the market was being built, a cut and cover railway tunnel was constructed below street level to create a triangular junction with the railway between Blackfriars and Kings Cross through Snow Hill Tunnel. The tunnel was closed in 1916, but it has been reopened and is now used by Thameslink rail services. The construction of extensive railway sidings, beneath Smithfield Park, facilitated the transfer of animal carcasses to its cold store, and directly up to the meat market via lifts. These sidings closed in the 1960s. They are now used as a car park, accessed via a cobbled descent at the centre of Smithfield Park. Today, much of the meat is delivered to market by road.

The first extension of Smithfield's meat market was built between 1873 and 1876 with the construction of the Poultry Market immediately west of the Central Market. A rotunda was built at the centre of the old Market Field (now West Smithfield), comprising gardens, centred around the Peace drinking fountain and a ramped carriageway to the station beneath the market building. Further buildings were subsequently added to the market. The General Market, built between 1879 and 1883, was intended to replace the old Farringdon Market located nearby and established for the sale of fruit and vegetables when the earlier Fleet Market was cleared to enable the laying out of Farringdon Street between 1826–1830.

A further block (also known as Annexe Market or Triangular Block,) consisting of two separate structures (the Fish Market and the Red House), was built between 1886 and 1899. The Fish Market, built by John Mowlem & Co., was completed in 1888, one year after Sir Horace Jones' death. The Red House, with its imposing red brick and Portland stone façade, was built between 1898 and 1899 for the London Central Markets Cold Storage Co. Ltd.. It was one of the first cold stores to be built outside the London docks, and continued to serve Smithfield Market until the mid-1970s.

=== 20th century ===
During the Second World War, a large underground cold store at Smithfield was the theatre of secret experiments led by Dr Max Perutz on pykrete, a mixture of ice and woodpulp, believed to be possibly tougher than steel. Perutz's work, inspired by Geoffrey Pyke and part of Project Habakkuk, was meant to test the viability of pykrete as a material to construct floating airstrips in the Atlantic to allow refuelling of cargo planes in support of Admiral the Earl Mountbatten's operations. The experiments were carried out by Perutz and his colleagues in a refrigerated meat locker in a Smithfield Market butcher's basement, behind a protective screen of frozen animal carcasses. These experiments became obsolete with the development of longer-range aircraft, resulting in abandonment of the project.

Towards the very end of the Second World War, a V-2 rocket struck the north side of Charterhouse Street, near the junction with Farringdon Road (1945). The explosion caused massive damage to the market buildings, affected the railway tunnel structure below, and caused more than 110 deaths.

On 23 January 1958, a fire broke out in the basement of Union Cold Storage Co at the Smithfield Poultry Market. The fire spread throughout the maze of basements under the market and burned for three days. Over 1,700 fire fighters with 389 fire engines were required to bring the blaze under control. Two firefighters were killed and 50 were injured or treated for smoke inhalation. The market was largely destroyed, and large portions not directly affected by fire collapsed as basements caved in. The introduction of breathing apparatus by the London Fire Brigade was a direct result of the fire.

A red plaque commemorating the two firefighters who died was unveiled at the market on the 60th anniversary of the fire. A replacement building was designed by Sir Thomas Bennett in 1962–63, with a reinforced concrete frame, and external cladding of dark blue brick. It is Grade II listed. The main hall is covered by an enormous concrete dome, shaped as an elliptical paraboloid, spanning 225 feet (69 m) by 125 feet (38 m) and only 3 inches (7.6 cm) thick at the centre. The dome is believed to have been the largest concrete shell structure built at that time in Europe.

=== Today ===
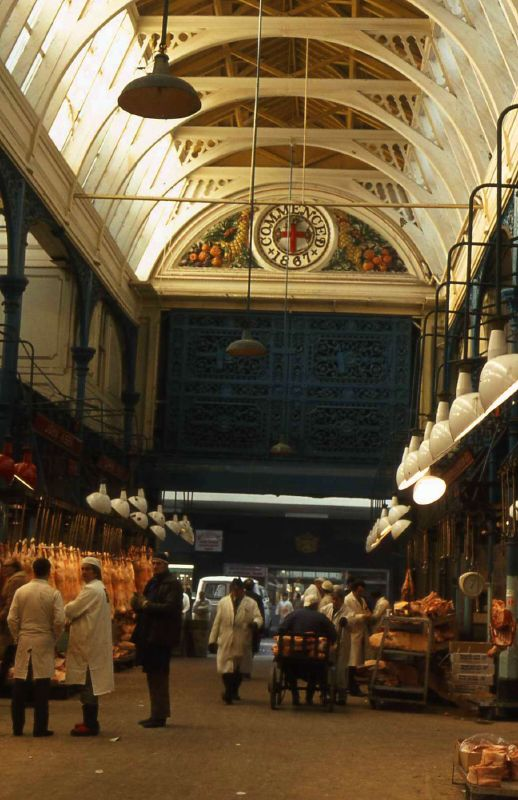
Smithfield Central Market at work

Smithfield is the City of London's only major wholesale market (Leadenhall Market nowadays attracts more tourist trade) which has escaped relocation out of central London to cheaper land, better transport links, and more modern facilities. (Covent Garden, Billingsgate and Spitalfields relocated in the 1970s, 1980s and 1990s respectively.) The market operates to supply inner city butchers, shops and restaurants with quality fresh meat, and so its main trading hours are 4:00 a.m. to 12:00 noon each weekday. Instead of moving away, Smithfield Market continues to modernise its existing site: its imposing Victorian buildings have had access points added for the loading and unloading of lorries.

The buildings stand above a warren of tunnels: previously, live animals were brought to market by hoof (from the mid-19th century onwards they arrived by rail) and were slaughtered on site. The former railway tunnels are now used for storage, parking and as basements. An impressive cobbled ramp spirals down around West Smithfield's public garden, on the south side of the market, providing access to part of this area. Some of the buildings on Charterhouse Street on Smithfield's north side maintain access to the tunnels via their basements.

Some of the former meat market buildings have now changed use. For example, the former Central Cold Store, on Charterhouse Street is now, most unusually, a city centre cogeneration power station operated by Citigen. The Metropolitan Cold Stores was converted in 1999 into the nightclub Fabric and the 'Smiths' of Smithfield bars and restaurants.

Smithfield comprises the market as its central feature, surrounded by many old buildings on three sides and a public open space (or Rotunda Garden) at West Smithfield, beneath which there is a public car park. The south side is occupied by St Bartholomew's Hospital (known as Barts in common parlance), and on the east side by the Priory Church of St Bartholomew the Great. The Church of St Bartholomew the Less is located next to the King Henry VIII Gate, the hospital's main entrance.

The north and south of the square are now closed to through traffic, as part of the City's security and surveillance cordon known as the Ring of steel. Security for the market is provided by its market constabulary.

=== Closure ===
==== Abandoned relocation to Dagenham ====
In early 2019, the City of London Corporation's main decision-making body, the Court of Common Council, proposed that Billingsgate Fish Market, New Spitalfields Market and Smithfield Market should move to a new consolidated site in Dagenham Dock. A formal planning application was made in June 2020, and received outline permission in March 2021. However, in November 2024, the council announced it did not intend to proceed with these plans as they were no longer economically viable; the £800 million cost was deemed too expensive.

==== Planned closure, then planned relocation to Newham ====
The City of London Corporation announced in November 2024 that Smithfield market, along with Billingsgate Fish Market, would close in or after 2028 with no replacement. A deal was struck between the Corporation and a group of traders, who would receive £150 million in compensation, and would not protest against the closure. However, in December 2025, the Corporation and the Greater London Authority signed a Memorandum of Understanding to relocate both wholesale markets to Albert Island east of London City Airport in Newham, and in June 2026 the GLA started to procure a partner for the £220m markets development.

=== Demolition and development plans ===
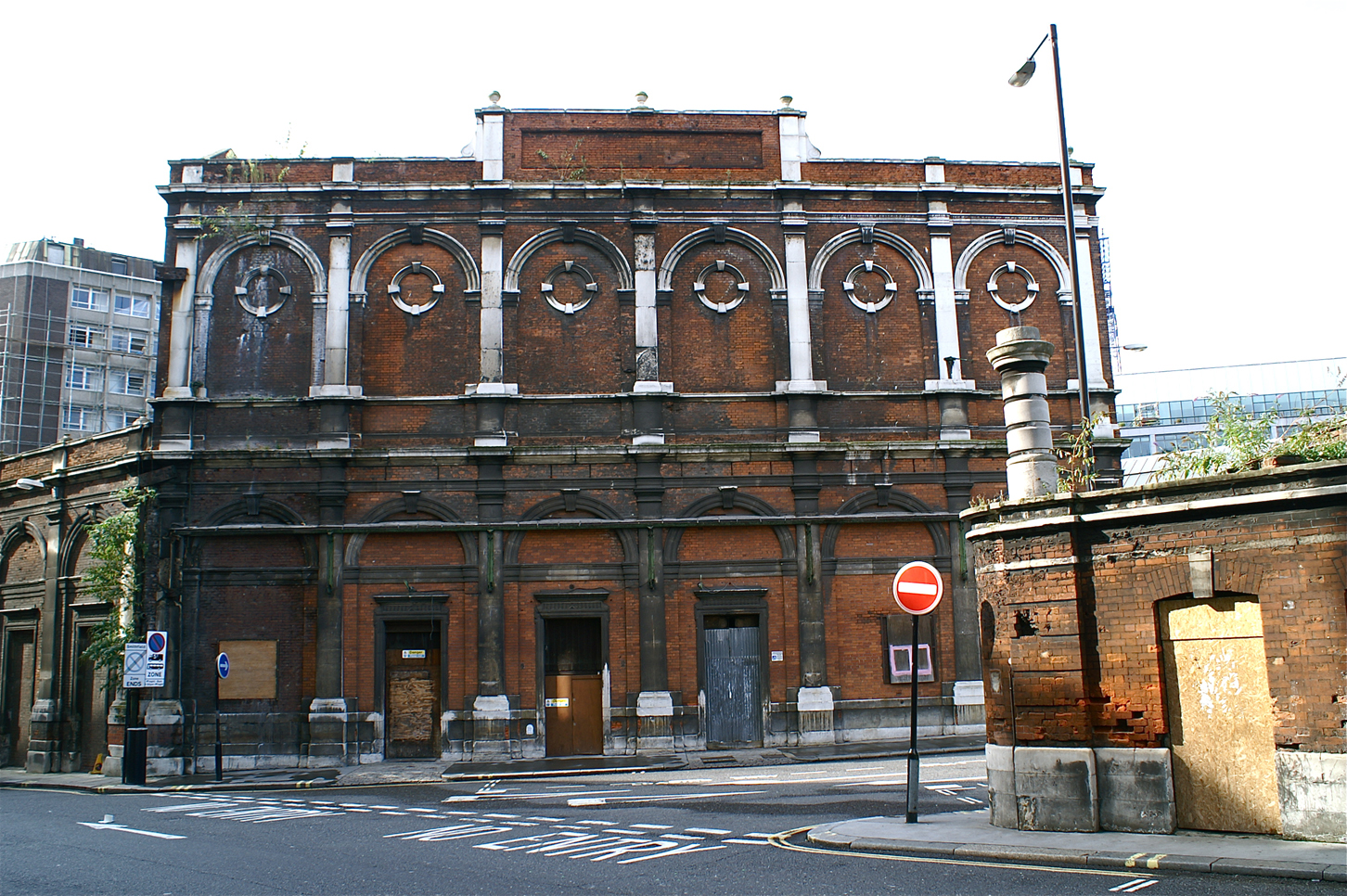
Red House, built 1898, formerly a cold store.

Since 2005, the General Market (1883) and the adjacent Fish Market and Red House buildings (1898), part of the Victorian complex of the Smithfield Market, have been facing a threat of demolition. The City of London Corporation, the ultimate owner of the property, has been engaged in public consultation to assess how best to redevelop the disused property and regenerate the area. Former property developers Thornfield Properties had planned to demolish the historic site and build a seven-storey office block, offering 350,000 square feet (33,000 m^{2}) of office space, with a retail outlet on the ground floor.

Several campaigns, promoted by English Heritage and Save Britain's Heritage among others, were run to raise public awareness of this part of London's Victorian heritage. Grade II listed building protection was approved for the Red House Cold Store building in 2005 by Culture Secretary Tessa Jowell, on the basis of new historical evidence qualifying the complex as "the earliest existing example of a purpose-built powered cold store".

Whilst the market continues to trade, its future remains unclear following a major public inquiry in 2007, instigated by Planning Minister Ruth Kelly. The public inquiry concerning the proposed demolition and redevelopment of the General Market Building was held between 6 November 2007 and 25 January 2008. In August 2008, Communities Secretary Hazel Blears announced that planning permission for the General Market's redevelopment had been refused, stating that the threatened buildings made "a significant contribution" to the character and appearance of Farringdon and the surrounding area.

On 12 October 2012, Henderson Group unveiled its £160 million plan for redeveloping the western side of the Central Market. Henderson proposed that the fish market, General Market and Red House buildings, all over a century old, be demolished to make way for restaurants, retailers and office buildings, while they would restore and retain much of the market building's original perimeter walls, with a new piazza being created in the General Market. Marcus Binney of the campaign group Save Britain's Heritage said: "This proposal constitutes the worst mutilation of a Victorian landmark in the last 30 years."

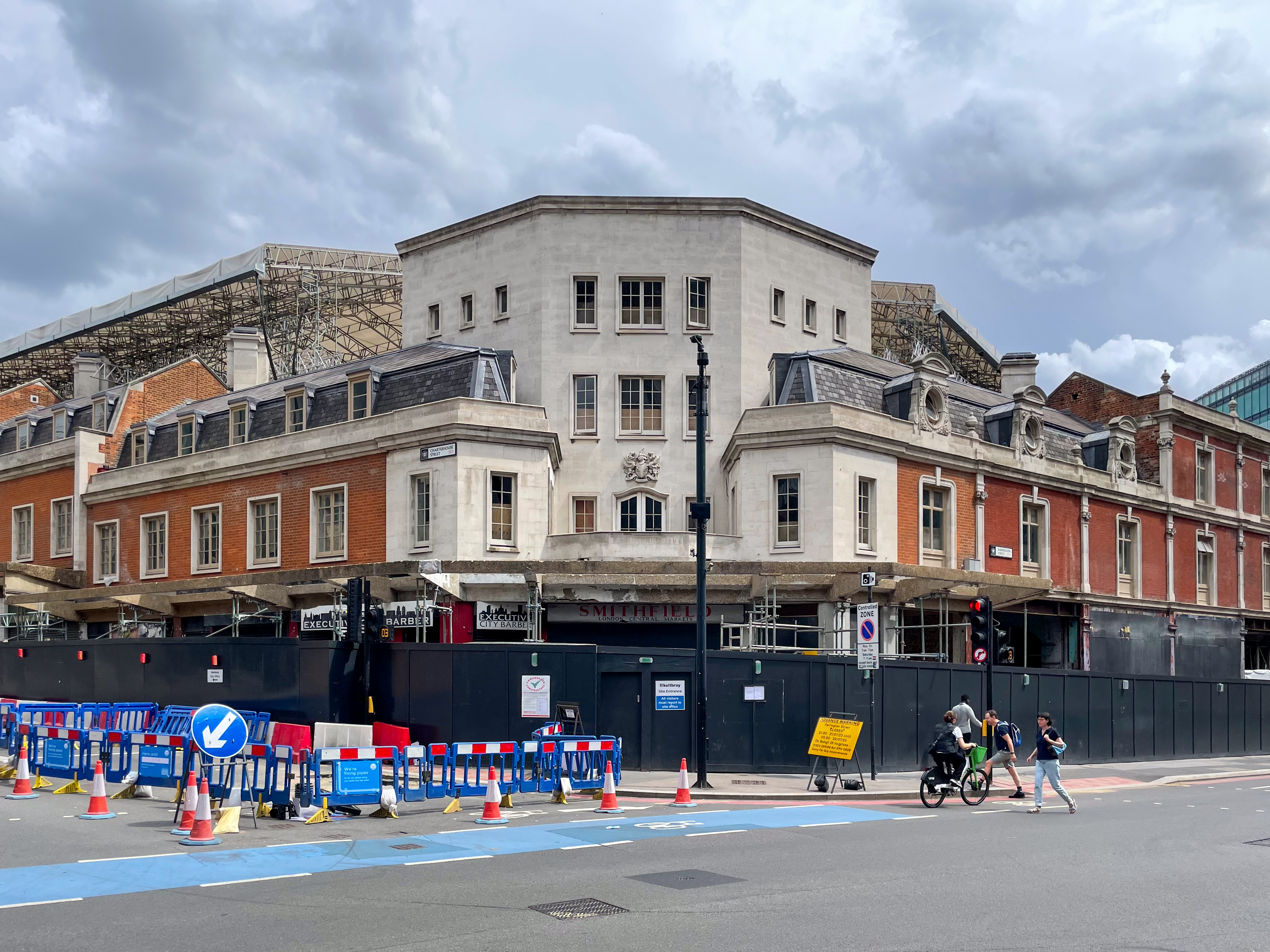
Construction work in 2023

Some of the buildings on Lindsey Street opposite the East Market were demolished in 2010 to allow the construction of the new Elizabeth line station at Farringdon. The demolished buildings included Smithfield House (an early 20th-century unlisted Hennebique concrete building), the Edmund Martin Ltd. shop (an earlier building with alterations dating to the 1930s), and two Victorian warehouses behind them.

In March 2015, the Museum of London revealed plans to vacate its Barbican site at 150 London Wall and move into the General Market Building. The Barbican site closed on 4 December 2022, to prepare for the subsequent move. The foundation stone for its new West Smithfield site was unveiled on 16 October 2023, with the reopening of the museum at the new site still planned for 2026.

== Cultural references ==
=== Words and phrases ===
- Smithfield bargain originally referred to a deal in which the purchaser was exploited. The term later came to mean (in reference to the meat market) a marriage of convenience, one to the groom's financial benefit. In this context it was also known as a Smithfield Match. Still later the term came to be used to refer to improper dealings, such as when MPs allowed their vote to be bought.
- Smithfield Races, an alternative name for the old horse market. It originated in the distant past, when there was horse racing at Smithfield. Although the racing ceased as the surrounding area steadily developed, the name continued to be used for a long time afterwards.

=== In film ===
Episode 1 of Espionage (TV series), "The Incurable One", (broadcast in the UK on 5 October 1963), includes footage of Steven Hill, and Ingrid Thulin walking towards, through, and out of the market into the area.

== Gallery ==
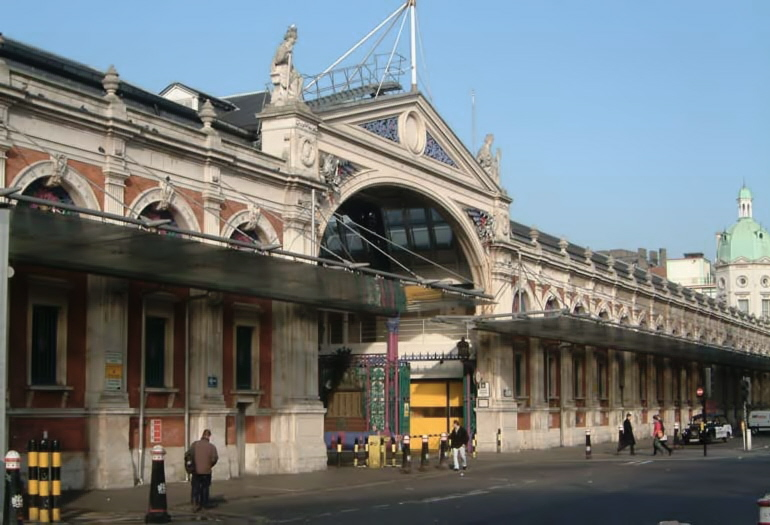
The Central Market and Grand Avenue from the south

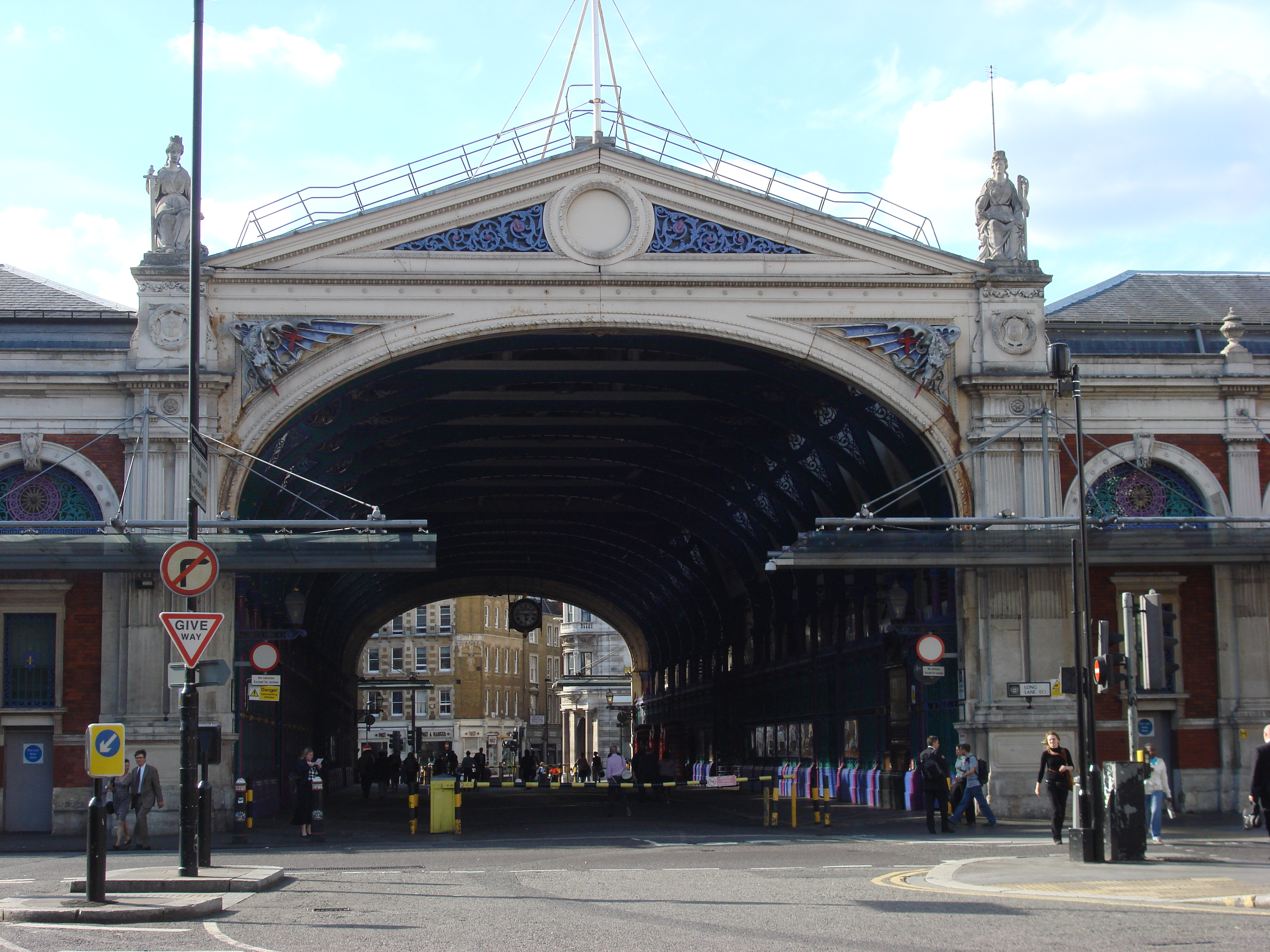
The entrance of the Grand Avenue from the south

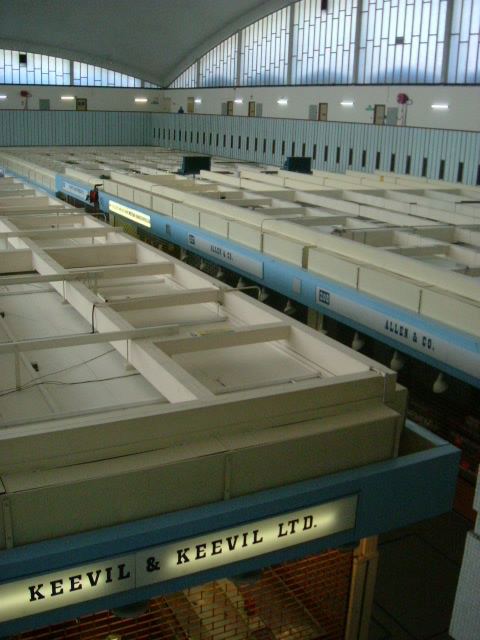
Inside the Poultry Market

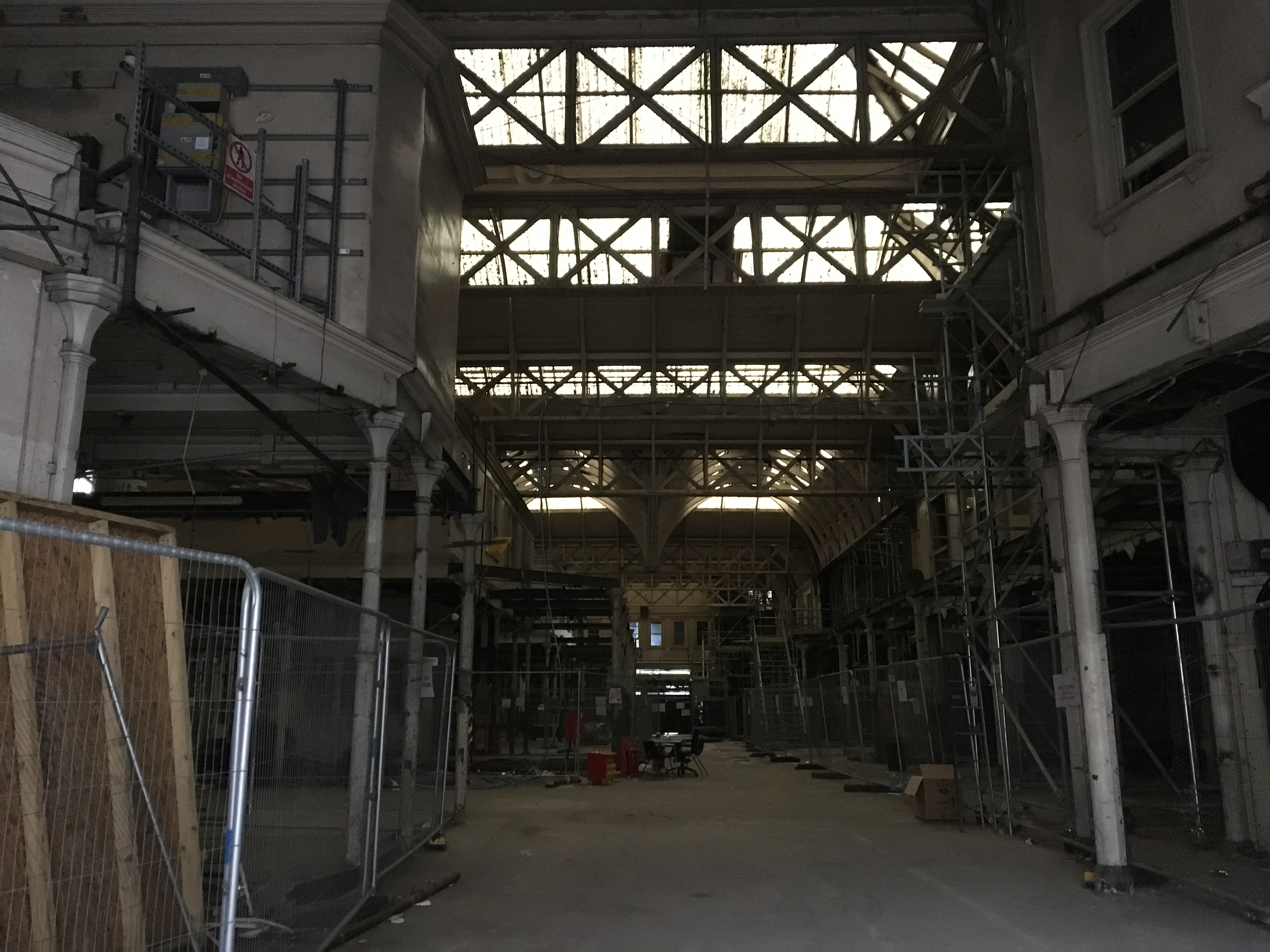
Market interior

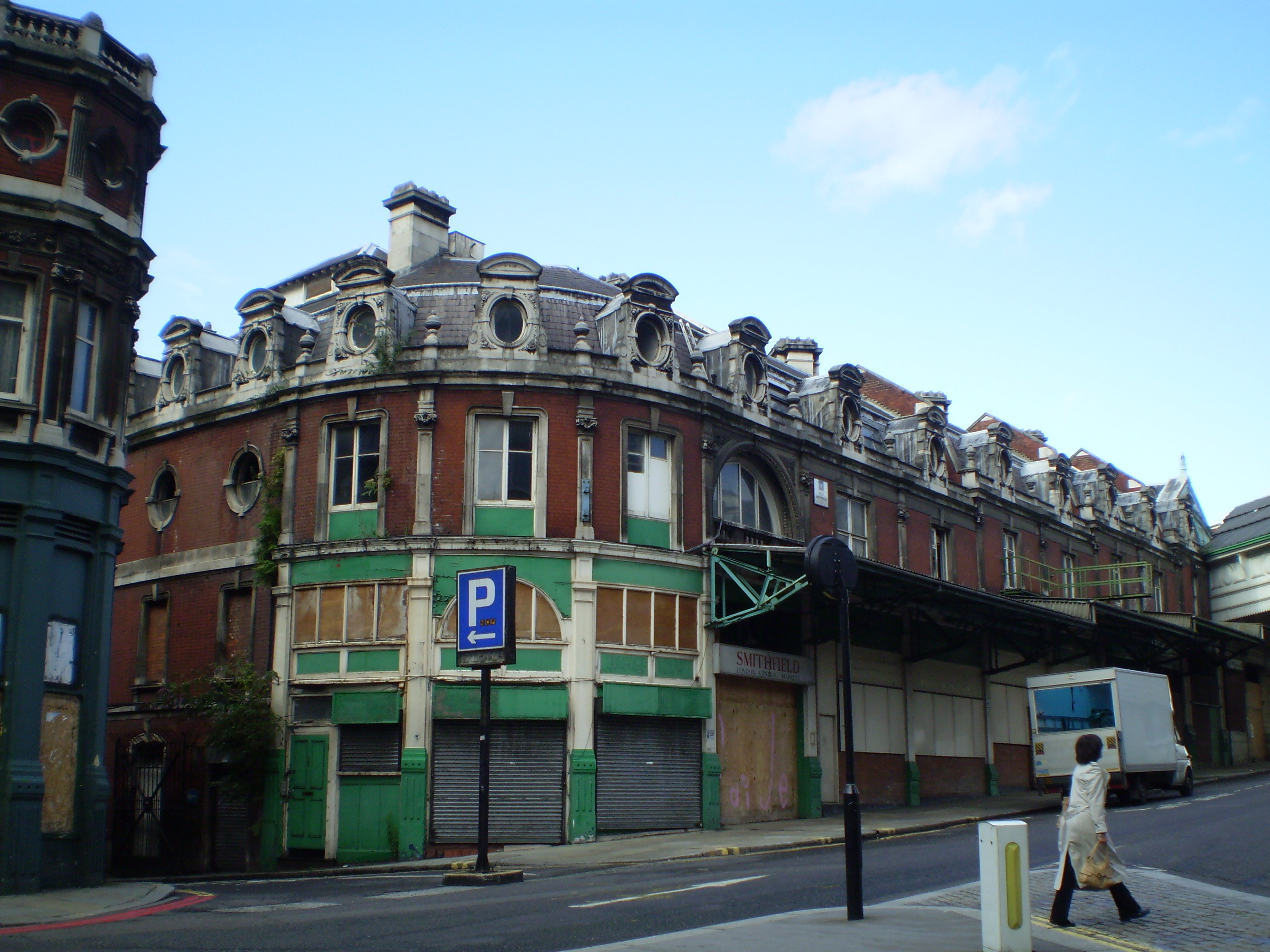
The General Market (now abandoned)

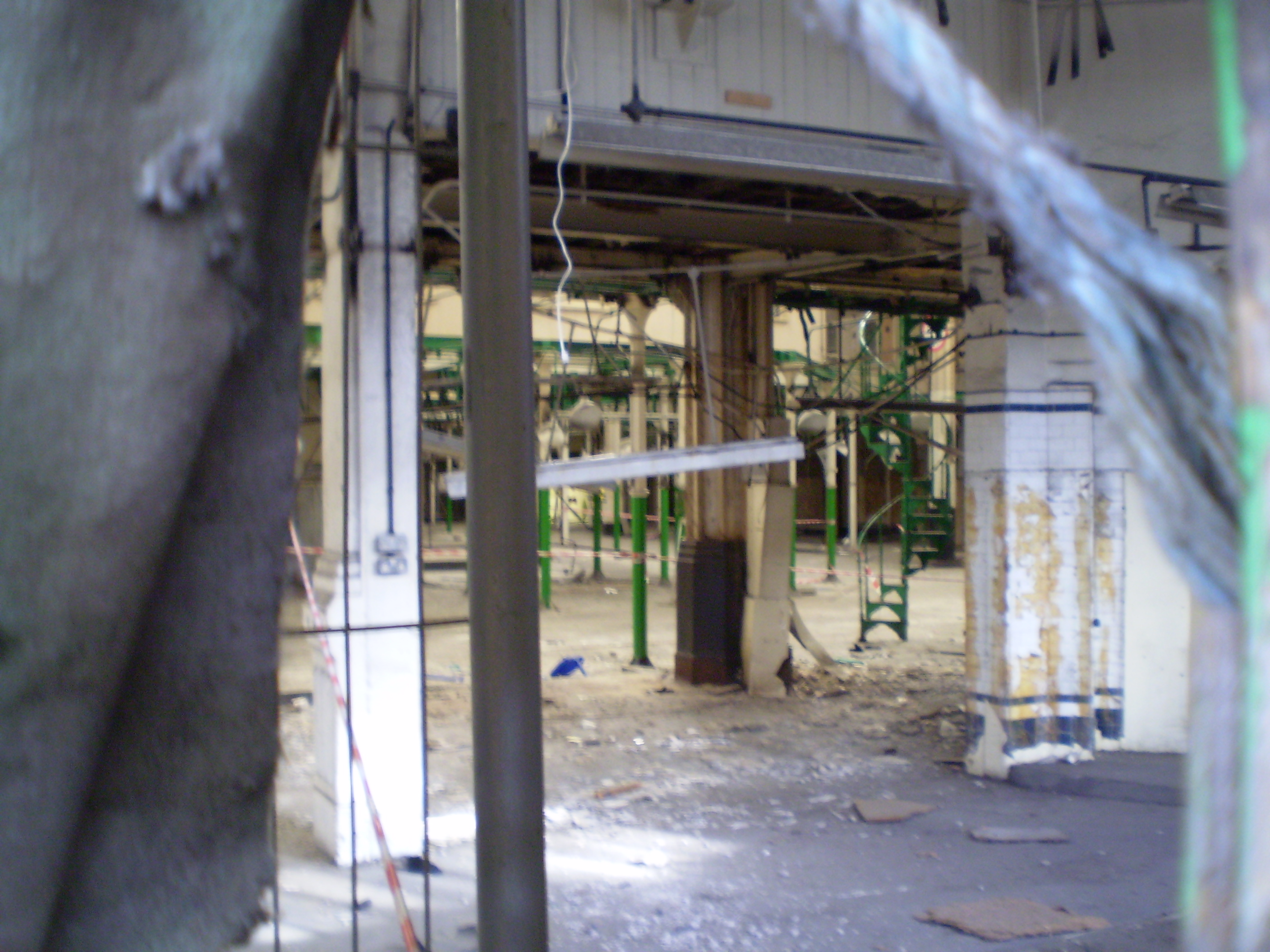
Inside the General Market (now abandoned)

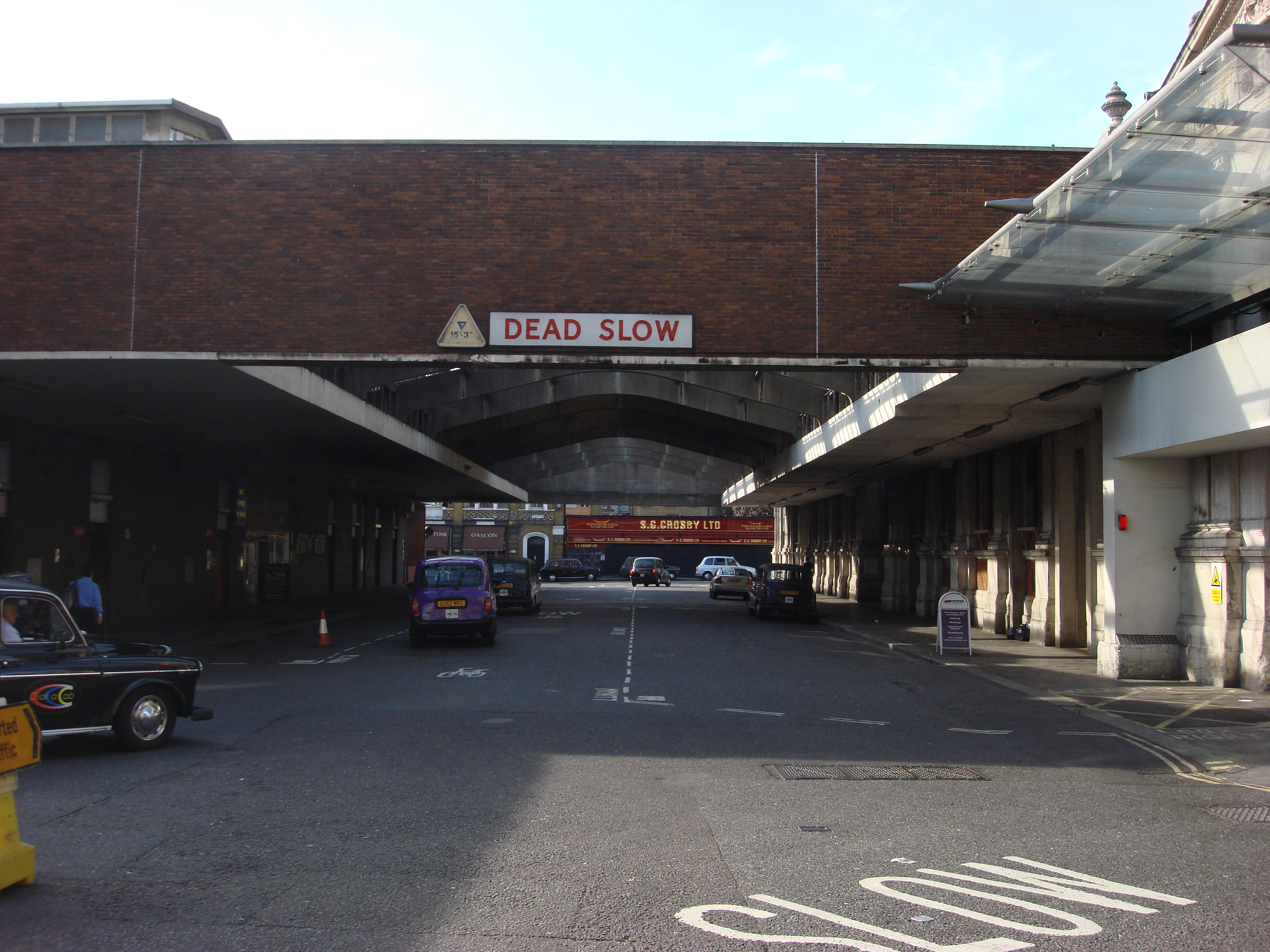
East Poultry Avenue

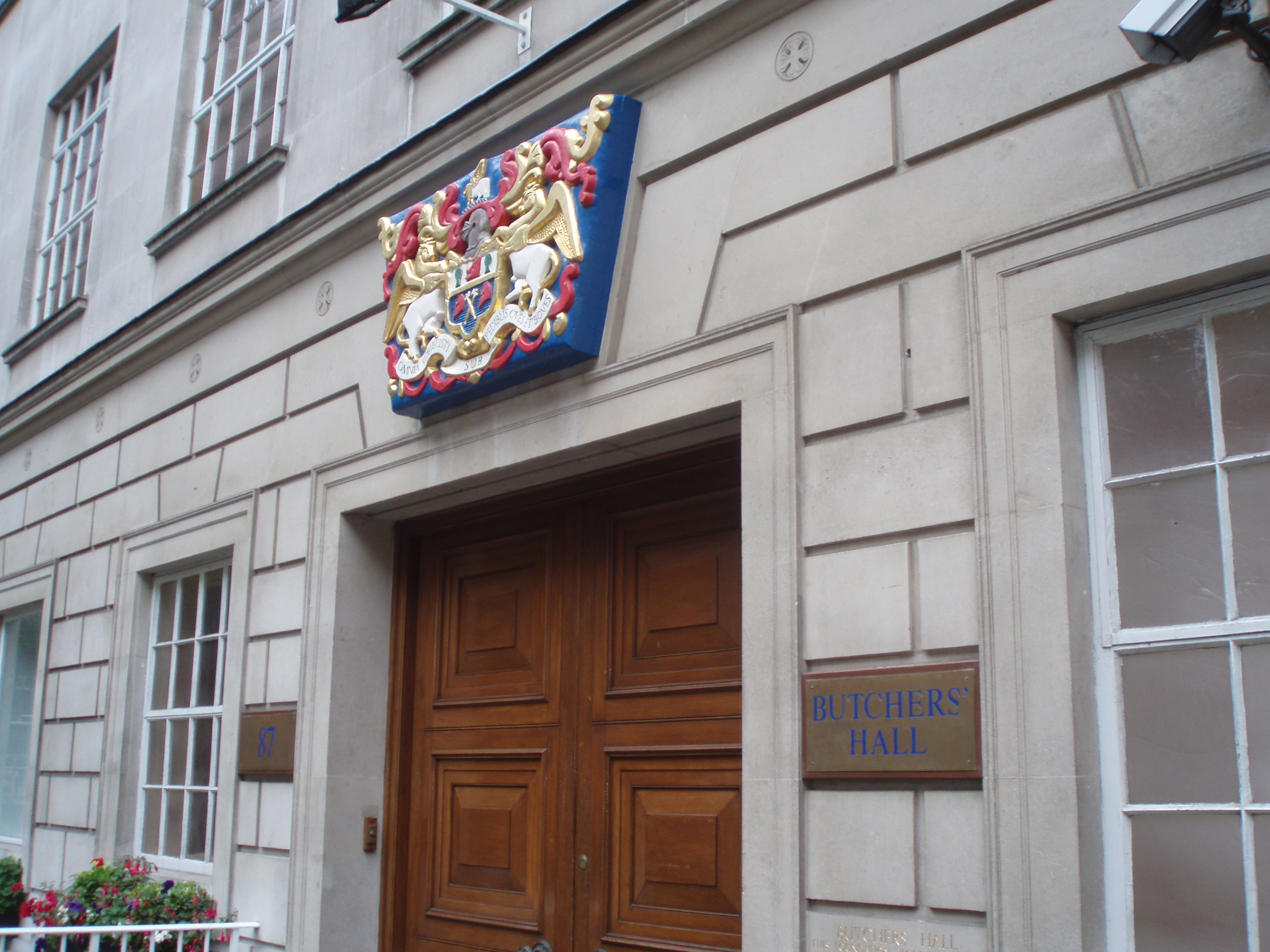
Butchers' Hall

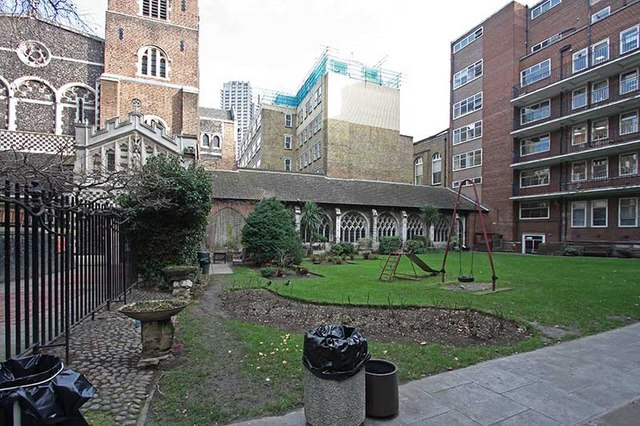
St Bartholomew the Great Priory Church's cloisters and Barts Hospital

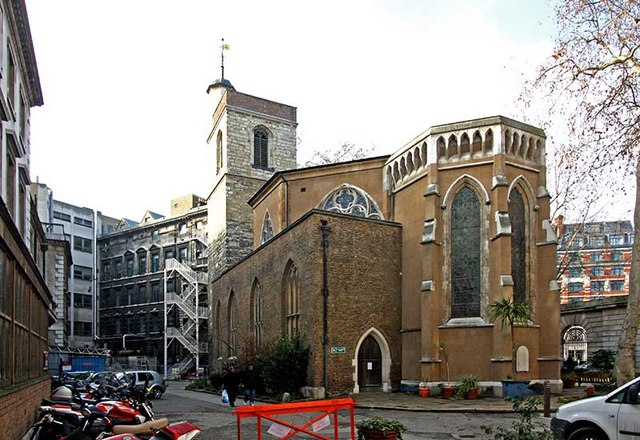
St Bartholomew the Less & Barts Hospital

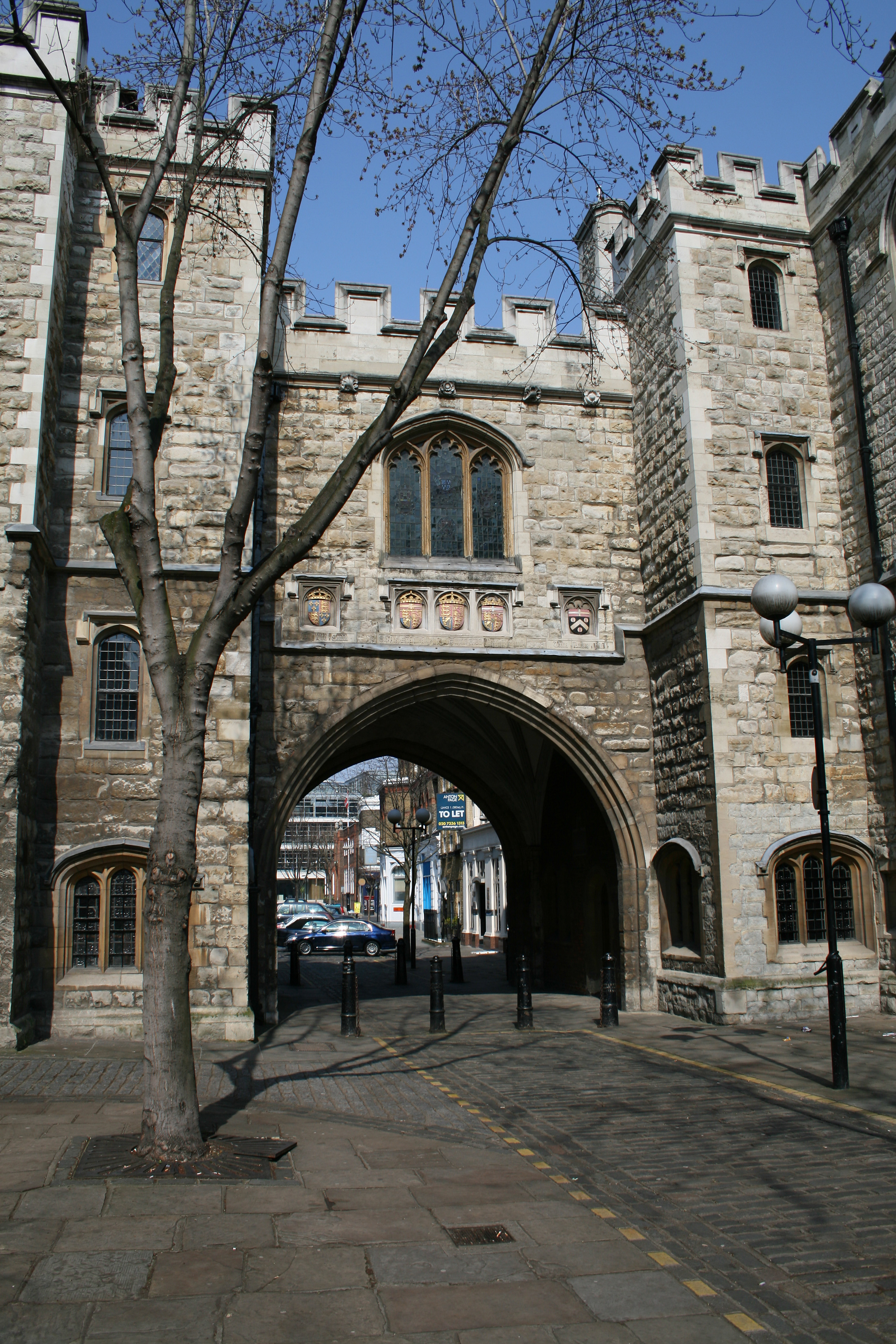
St John's Gate

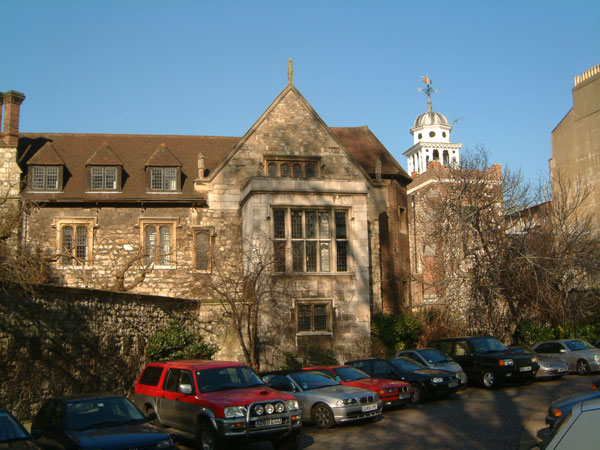
Charterhouse Square

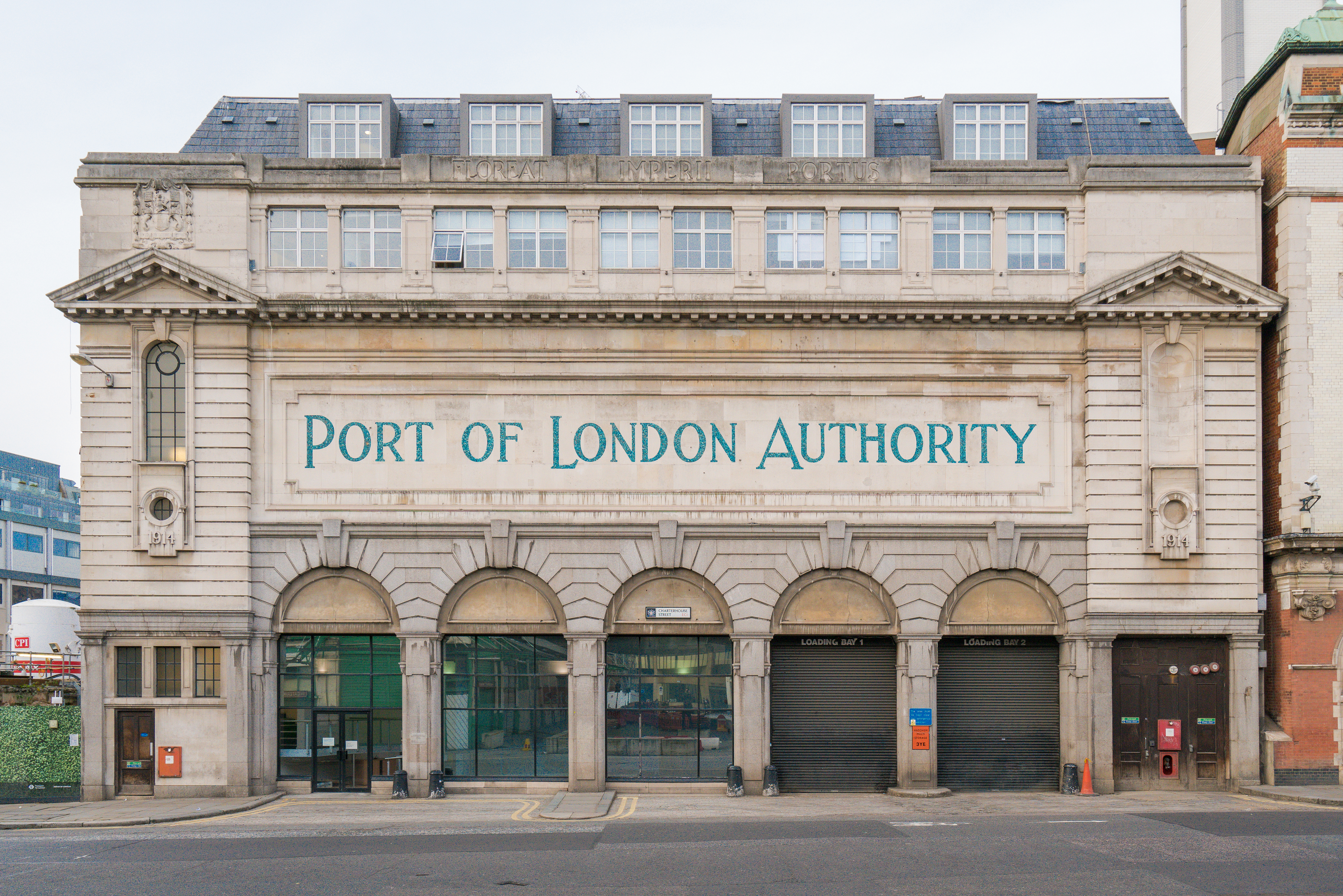
The Port of London Authority building

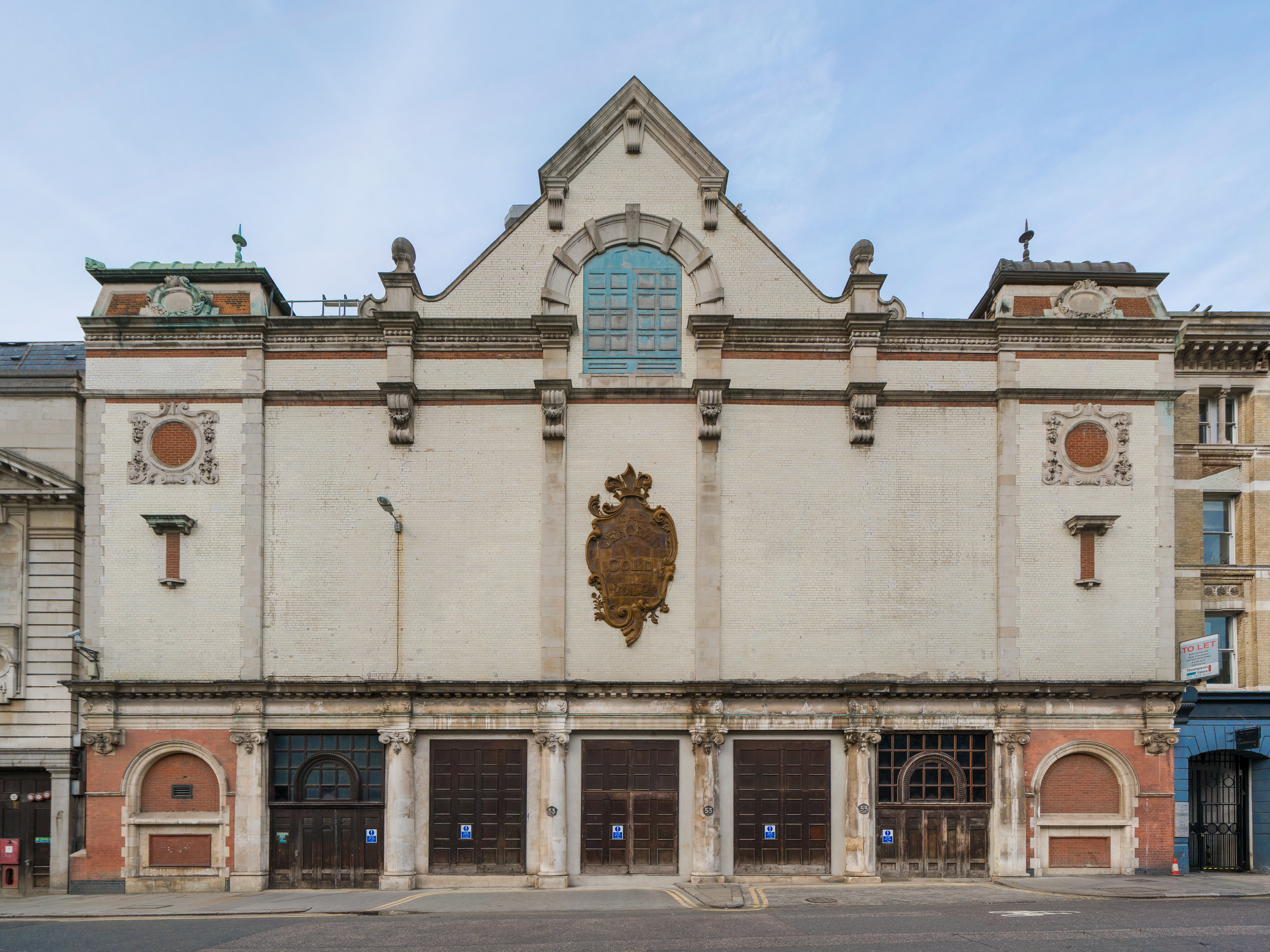
The former Central Cold Store, currently a power station

== See also ==
- Farringdon Without Ward
- List of markets in London
- List of people executed in Smithfield
- Wife selling appeared in satire as occurring at Smithfield Market, during the 18th century.
