= Giltspur Street =

Street in the City of London

Coordinates: 51°31′00″N 00°06′06″W

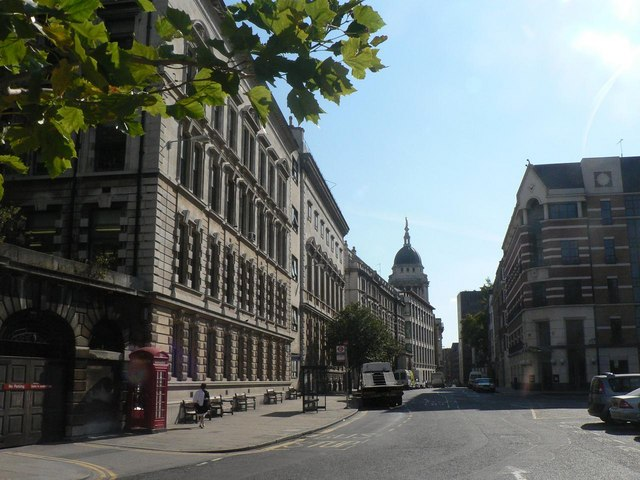
Giltspur Street, looking south towards the dome of the Old Bailey

Giltspur Street is a street in Smithfield in the City of London, England, running north–south from the junction of Newgate Street, Holborn Viaduct and Old Bailey, up to West Smithfield, and it is bounded to the east by St Bartholomew's Hospital. It was formerly known as Knightsriders Street, from the knights riding at the tournaments in Smithfield.

In 1381 King Richard II met the leaders of the Peasants' Revolt here, promising to agree to the rebels' demands, which included a repeal of the Statute of Labourers that prevented workers changing jobs for better pay. However, during the negotiations William Walworth, the Lord Mayor of London, lured rebel Wat Tyler away and stabbed him; when Tyler sought refuge in the neighbouring St. Bartholemew's Church he was dragged out and beheaded. The revolt later subsided.

Located on the junction of Giltspur Street and Cock Lane is the Golden Boy of Pye Corner, a cherub which is a symbol of gluttony, the sin which supposedly led to divine retribution in the form of the Great Fire of London. An inscription on the monument reads:

"The Boy at Pye Corner was erected to commemorate the staying of the Great Fire which beginning at Pudding Lane was ascribed to the sin of gluttony when not attributed to the Papists as on the Monument, and the Boy was made prodigiously fat to enforce the moral. He was originally built into the front of a public house called The Fortune of War which used to occupy this site and was pulled down in 1910."

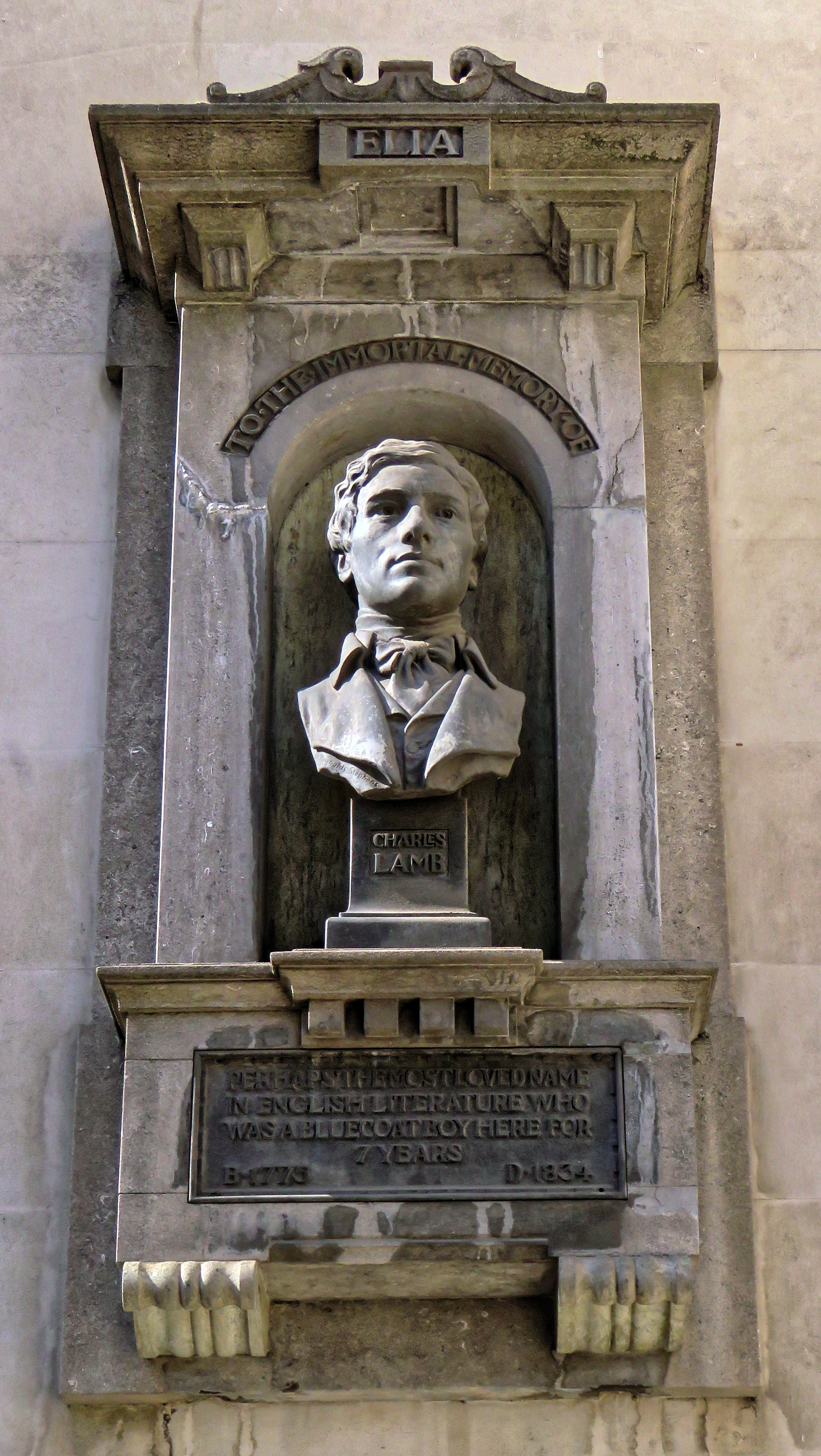
Memorial to the essayist Charles Lamb at Watch House on Giltspur Street

Also on Giltspur Street is a monument to the English essayist Charles Lamb, best known for his Essays of Elia and for co-writing the children's book Tales from Shakespeare. An inscription on the sculpture reads:

Perhaps the most loved name in English literature who was a bluecoat boy here for 7 years. B·1775, D·1834.

The street gave its name to the Giltspur Street Compter, a small prison located on the street from 1791 to 1855.

The nearest London Underground station is St Paul's and the closest mainline railway stations are City Thameslink and Farringdon.
