= Golden Boy of Pye Corner =

Sculpture in the City of London

Coordinates: 51.517298°N 0.101562°W

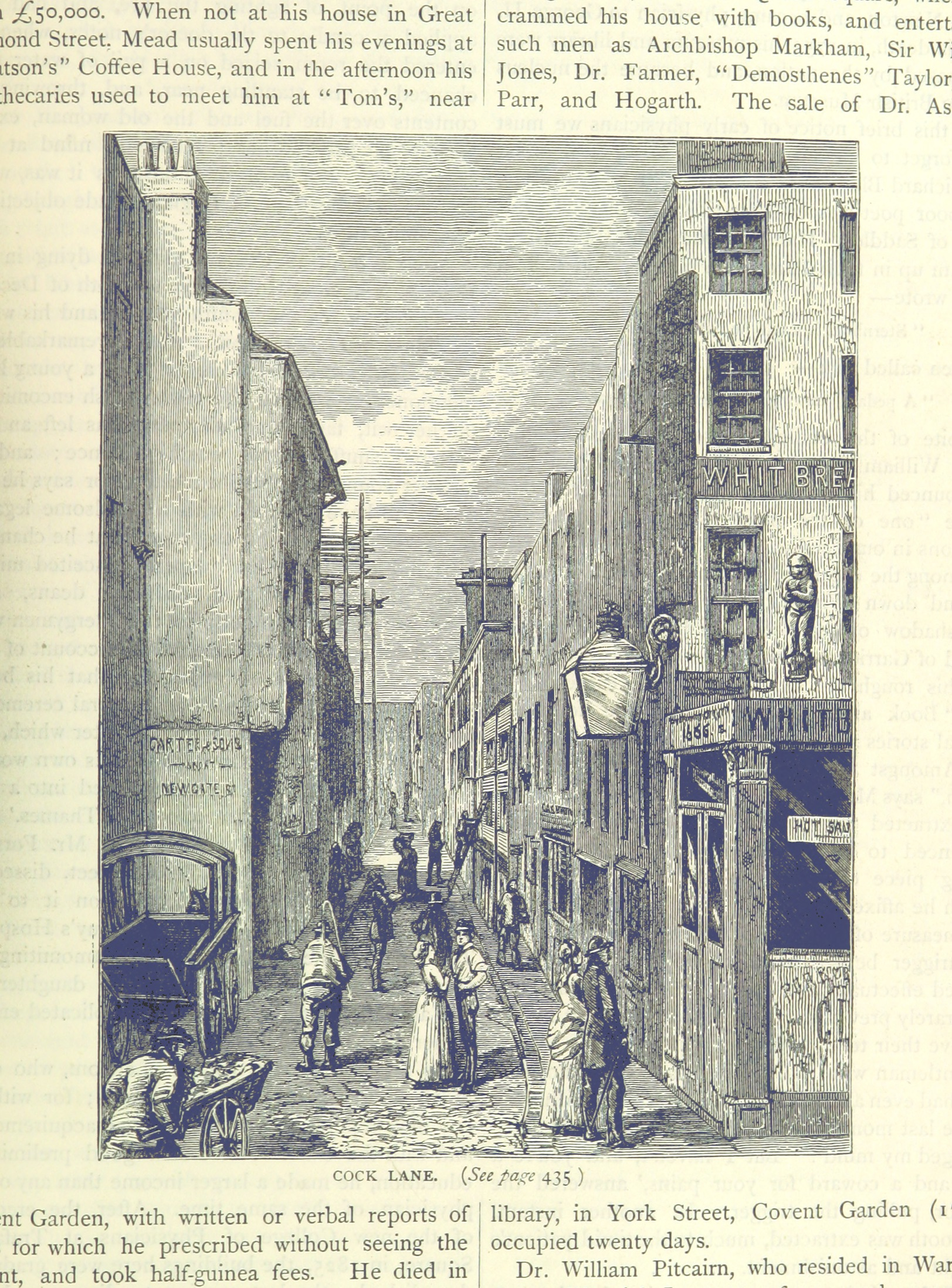
1873 drawing of the Golden Boy of Pye Corner

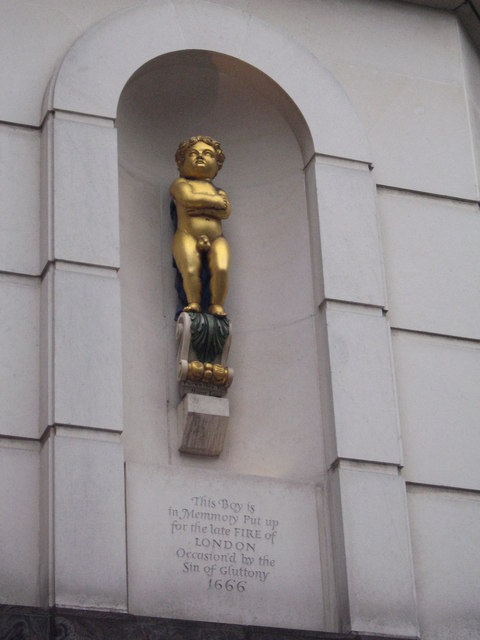
Golden Boy of Pye Corner

The Golden Boy of Pye Corner is a small late-17th-century monument located on the corner of Giltspur Street and Cock Lane in Smithfield, central London. It marks the spot where the 1666 Great Fire of London was stopped, whereas the Monument indicates the place where it started. The statue of a naked boy is made of wood and is covered with gold; the figure was formerly winged. The late 19th-century building that incorporates it is a Grade II listed building but listed only for the figure.

It bears the following small inscription below it:

This Boy is in Memmory Put up for the late FIRE of LONDON Occasion'd by the Sin of Gluttony 1666.

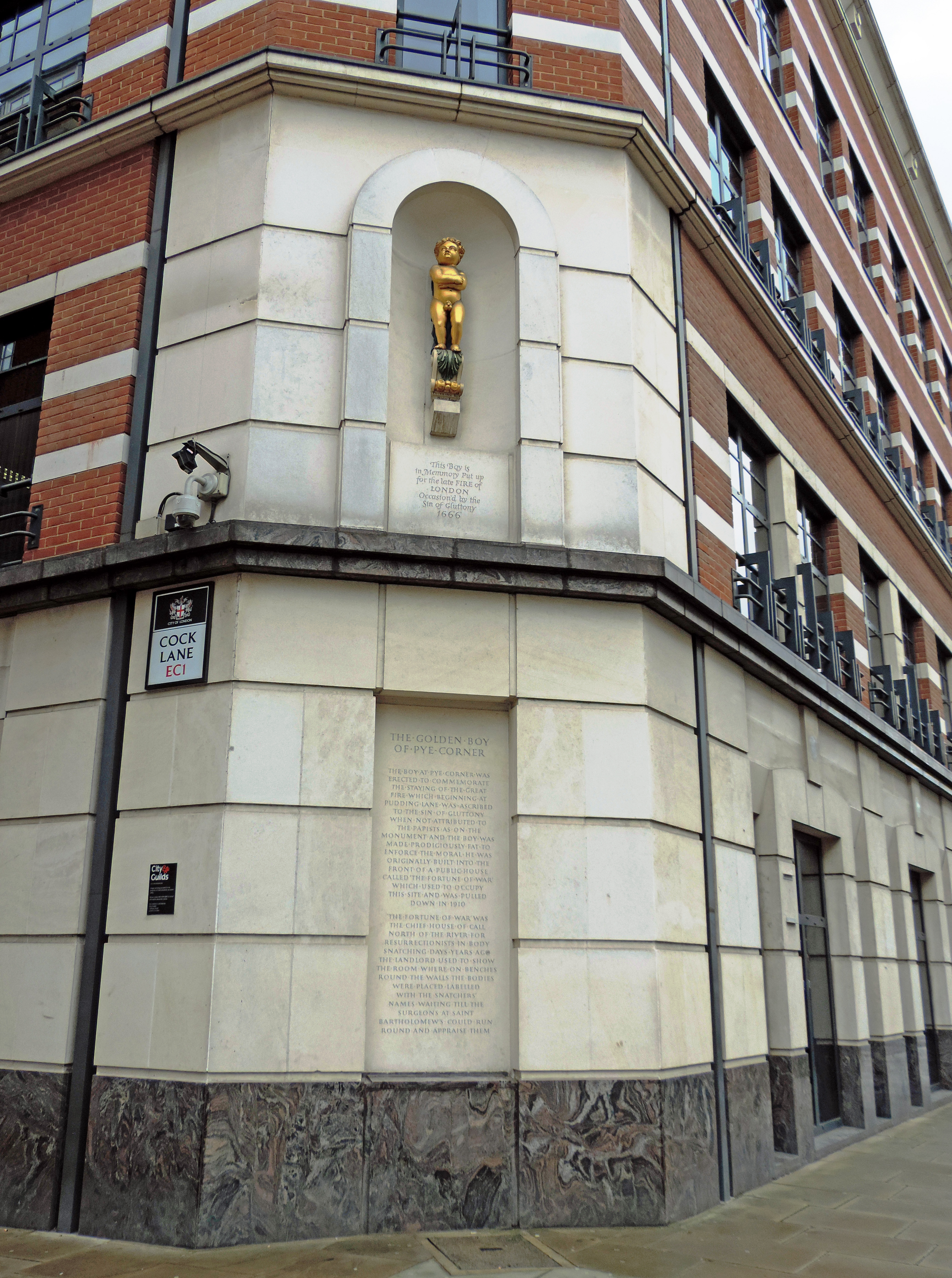
The street corner

The lower inscription, approximately 10 ft (3.0 m) below the boy, reads as follows:

The boy at Pye Corner was erected to commemorate the staying of the Great Fire, which, beginning at Pudding Lane, was ascribed to the sin of gluttony when not attributed to the papists as on the Monument, and the boy was made prodigiously fat to enforce the moral. He was originally built into the front of a public-house called "The Fortune of War" which used to occupy this site and was pulled down in 1910.

"The Fortune of War" was the chief house of call north of the river for resurrectionists in body snatching days. Years ago the landlord used to show the room where on benches round the walls the bodies were placed labelled with the snatchers' names, waiting till the surgeons at Saint Bartholomew's could run round and appraise them.

== See also ==
- List of public art in the City of London
- The Fortune of War (public house)
