= Cock Lane =

Street in the City of London, England

Coordinates: 51.51723°N 0.10235°W

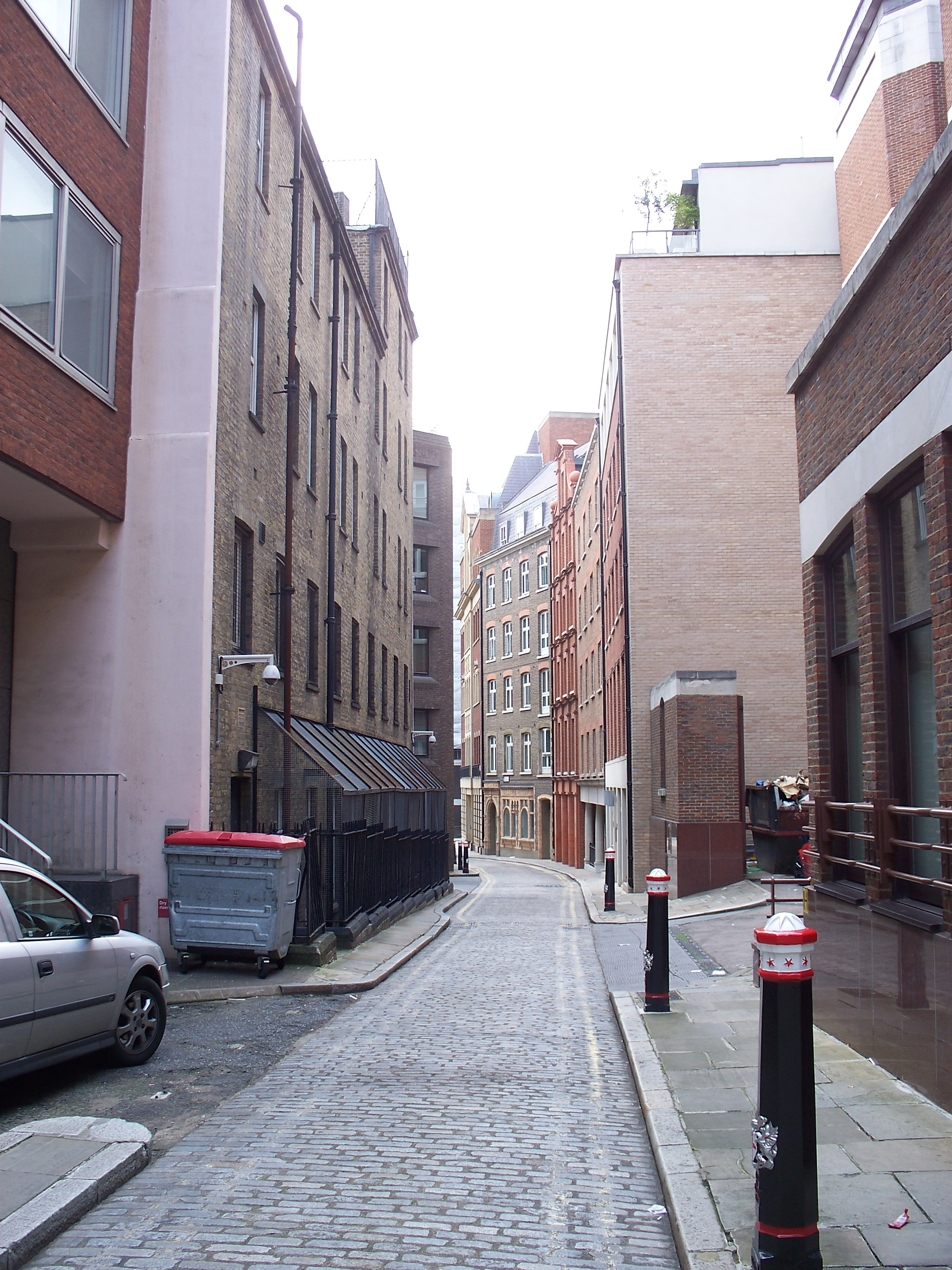
Cock Lane, from Pye Corner

Cock Lane is a small street in Smithfield in the City of London, leading from Giltspur Street in the east to Snow Hill in the west.

== History ==
=== Medieval period ===
In the medieval period, it was known as Cokkes Lane and was the site of legal brothels. In fact, in 1240, it was the first legal area for prostitution in the city.

=== Modern period ===
25 Cock Lane is the site where the supposed Cock Lane ghost manifested itself in 1762, and is also the place where writer John Bunyan, who wrote England's first best-seller, died from a fever in 1688.

The junction of Giltspur Street and Cock Lane was known as Pye Corner, famous as marking the furthest extent of the Great Fire of London, which is commemorated by the Golden Boy of Pye Corner. This effigy was originally built into the front of a public house called The Fortune of War which used to occupy the site but was pulled down in 1910.
