= Smithfield Poultry Market =

Market hall in London, England

Coordinates: 51.5186°N 0.1034°W

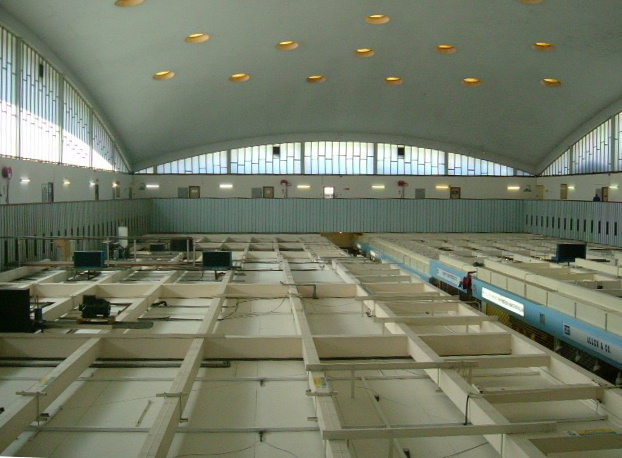
Inside the Poultry Market: view from the first floor gallery

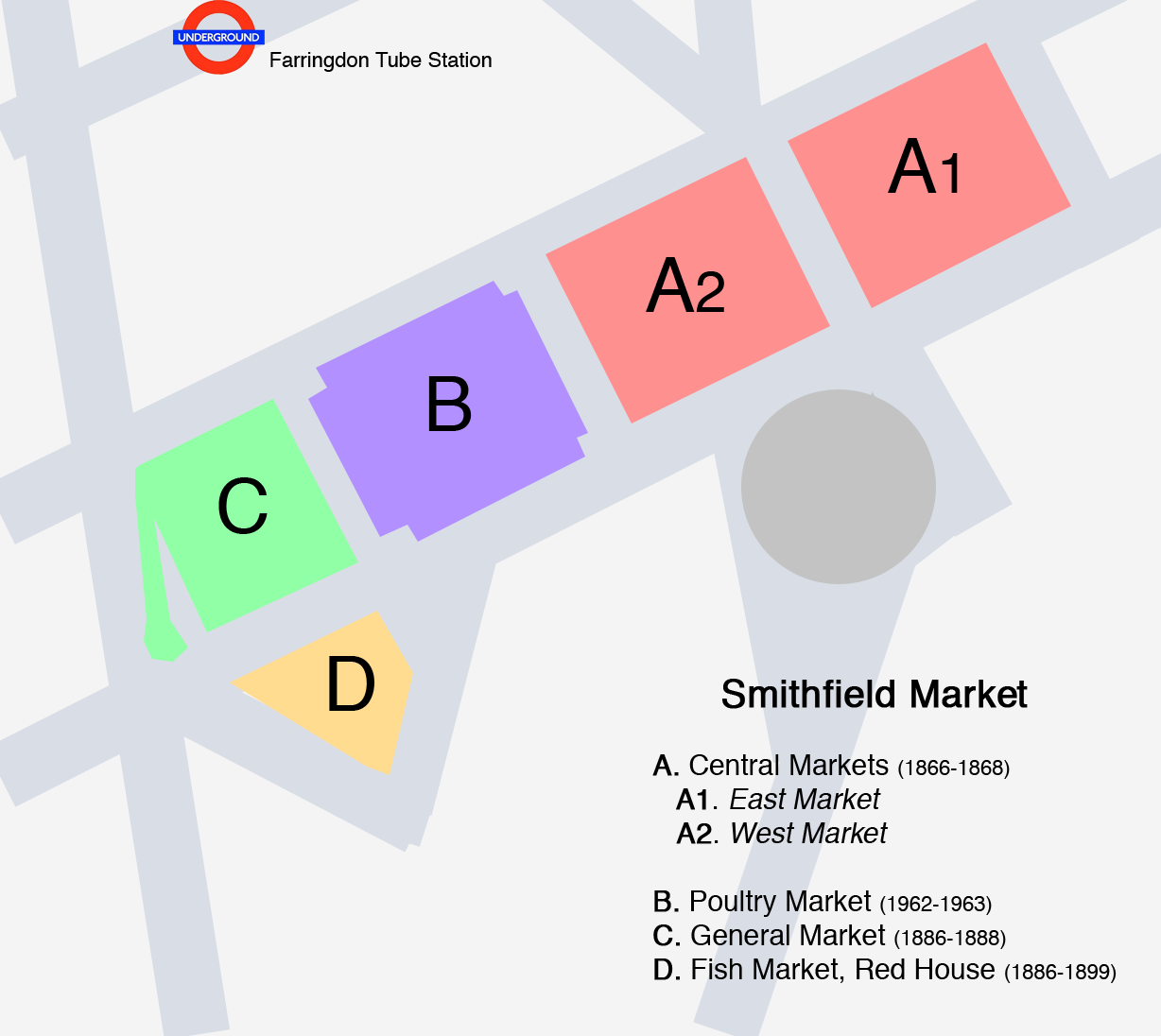
Map of the main buildings of the Smithfield Market complex: the Poultry Market is B (purple)

Smithfield Poultry Market was constructed in 1961–1963 to replace a Victorian market building in Smithfield, London, which was destroyed by fire in 1958. Its roof is claimed to be the largest concrete shell structure ever built, and the largest clear spanning dome roof in Europe.

== Background ==
The old poultry market was built under the provisions of the Metropolitan Meat and Poultry Market Act 1860 (23 & 24 Vict. c. cxciii) at the western end of Smithfield Market, designed by Sir Horace Jones in a similar style to the other market buildings. It opened in 1875 to the east of Farringdon Road but was destroyed by fire in 1958.

== Design ==
The new poultry market was designed by architects T P Bennett and Son. The structural engineers were Ove Arup & Partners, led by Povl Ahm and Jack Zunz. It was completed in 1963, costing £2 million.

The market traders opposed the original design, which had deliveries being made to the ground floor and trading on a first floor above. The replacement design has the trading on the ground floor, in a double-height market hall with rows of market stalls, and a first floor gallery around the inside for offices. Deliveries are made to nine delivery bays on each side, to the north and to the south, with hexagonal glass glazing blocks set in the walls. The building has a frame of reinforced concrete, clad externally with dark blue bricks. The basement includes storage and a public house, the Cock Tavern (now closed).

The design was intended to become a model that could be replicated across the whole Smithfield site, to replace the other Victorian market buildings, but in the event only the Poultry Market was built. It became a Grade II listed building in 2000. The building is no longer in use, and is due to become part of the Museum of London's relocation to Smithfield, along with the also disused Fish Market and General Market.

== Roof ==
The concrete shell roof spans 225 × 125 feet (69 × 38 m), with a double curvature sheet in the form of an elliptic paraboloid, mostly only 3 inches (7.6 cm) thick but up to 6 inches (15 cm) at the edges. It is claimed to be the largest concrete shell structure ever built, and the largest clear spanning dome roof in Europe. The shallow structure only rises 30 feet (9.1 m) in the centre, and is supported by pre-stressed concrete edge beams with clerestory glazing below, so it appear to balance on its corners. It is pierced by circular rooflights. The external roof surface and gables on each side are clad in copper.

Arup were previously involved in large concrete shell roofs at Brynmawr Rubber Factory (1945–1951) and the Bank of England Printing Works at Debden, Epping Forest (1956), now operated by De La Rue. The engineering calculations for the new roof were tested first with a 1/12 scale model.

The roof was constructed using over a thousand plywood shutters, each with a different shape. The shell was cast first, and then lifted from its formwork as cables for the edge beams were put under tension. The concrete edge beams were then cast in situ.

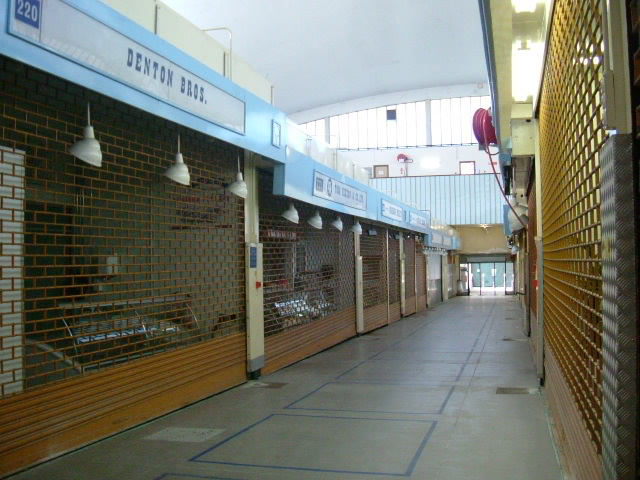
Inside the Poultry Market: ground flood

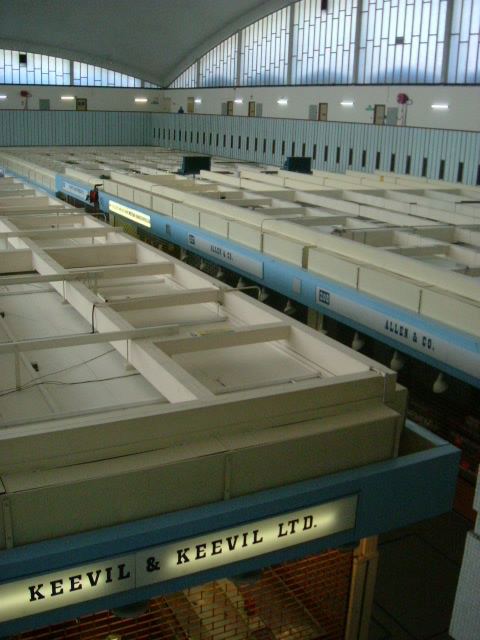
Inside the Poultry Market: first floor

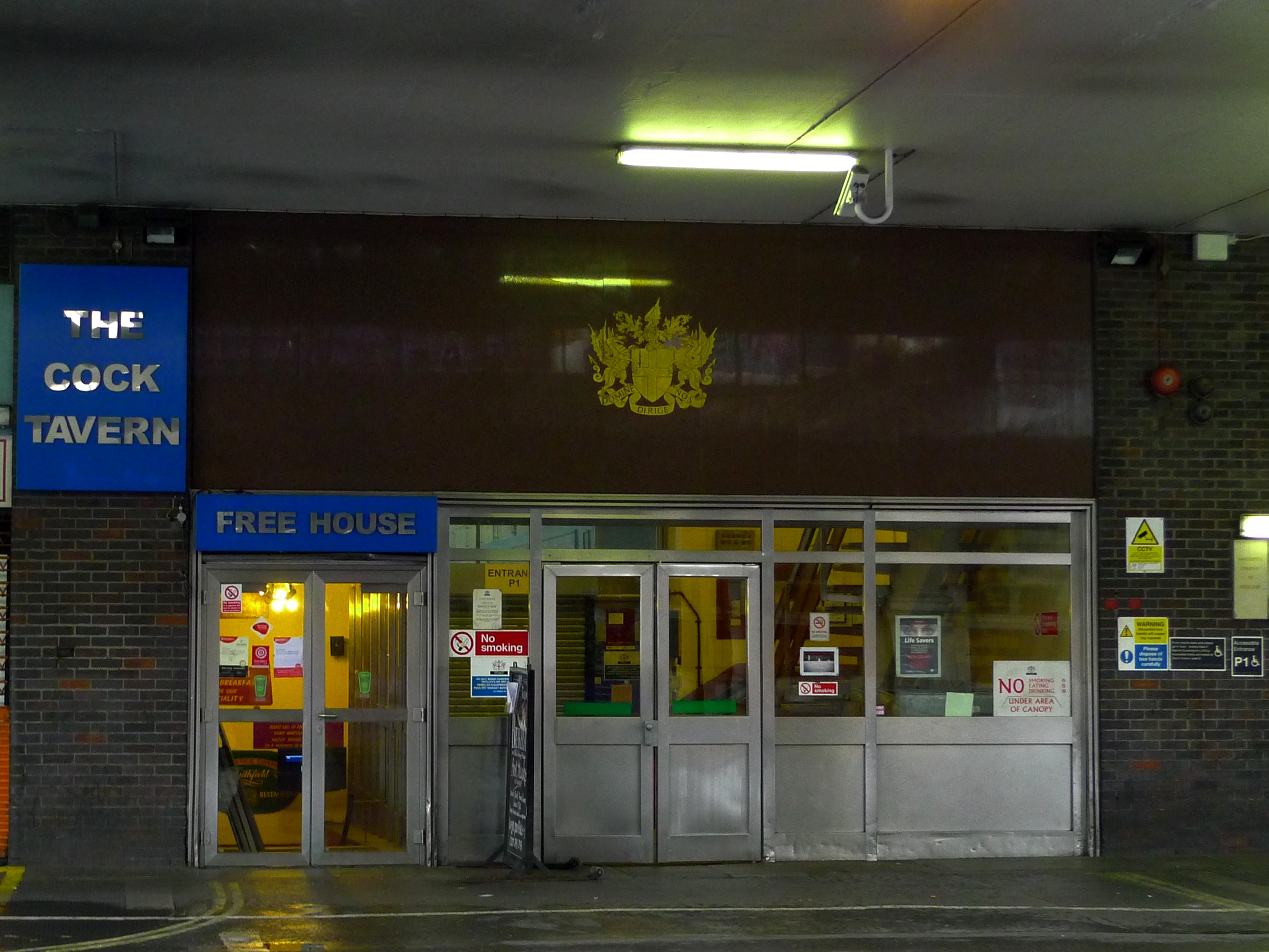
Entrance to the Cock Tavern
