= The Fortune of War, Smithfield =

Former pub in Smithfield, London

Coordinates: 51.51716°N 0.10157°W

The Fortune of War was a pub in Smithfield, London, on the junction of Giltspur Street and Cock Lane. The location, originally known as 'Pie Corner', is where a statue of the Golden Boy of Pye Corner marks the place where the Great Fire of London stopped. The statue was initially built in the front of the pub.

== History ==
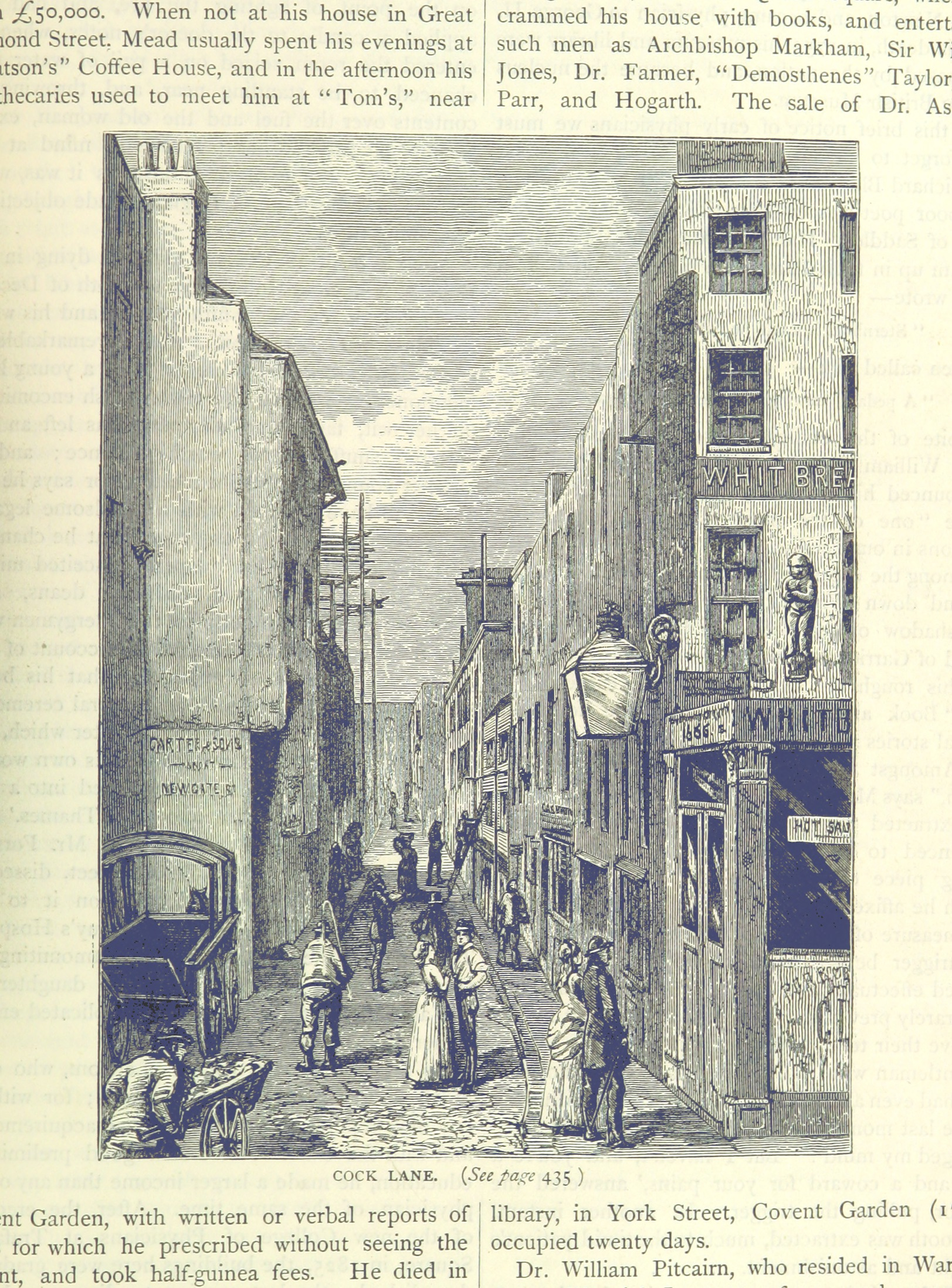
1873 drawing of the Golden Boy of Pye Corner

In 1761, the tenant of the house Thomas Andrews was convicted of sodomy and sentenced to death, but was pardoned by King George III in one of the first cases of public debate about homosexuality in England.

Until the 19th century, the Fortune of War was the chief house of call north of the River Thames for resurrectionists, being officially appointed by the Royal Humane Society as a place "for the reception of drowned persons". The landlord used to show the room whereon benches round the walls were placed with the snatchers' names waiting till the surgeons at St Bartholomew's Hospital could run round and appraise them. The London Burkers were known to use this pub.

The pub was demolished in 1910.

== In popular culture ==
The pub is mentioned in William Makepeace Thackeray's Vanity Fair (1848) in a chapter entitled "How to Live Well on Nothing a Year" (ch. 37):

The bill for servants' porter at the Fortune of War public house is a curiosity in the chronicles of beer. Every servant also was owed the greater part of his wages, and thus kept up perforce an interest in the house. Nobody in fact was paid. Not the blacksmith who opened the lock; nor the glazier who mended the pane; nor the jobber who let the carriage; nor the groom who drove it; nor the butcher who provided the leg of mutton; nor the coals which roasted it; nor the cook who basted it; nor the servants who ate it: and this I am given to understand is not infrequently the way in which people live elegantly on nothing a year.

It is also mentioned by Charles Dickens in his novel A Tale of Two Cities, where Jerry Cruncher of Tellson's Bank moonlights as a body snatcher. The Italian Boy by Sarah Wise has an account of the murder by Williams, Bishop and May to provide anatomical subjects for surgeons.

It is referenced along with the King of Denmark pub in the 2006 song The Resurrectionist by the Pet Shop Boys.
