= Smithfield Market Christmas Eve meat auction =

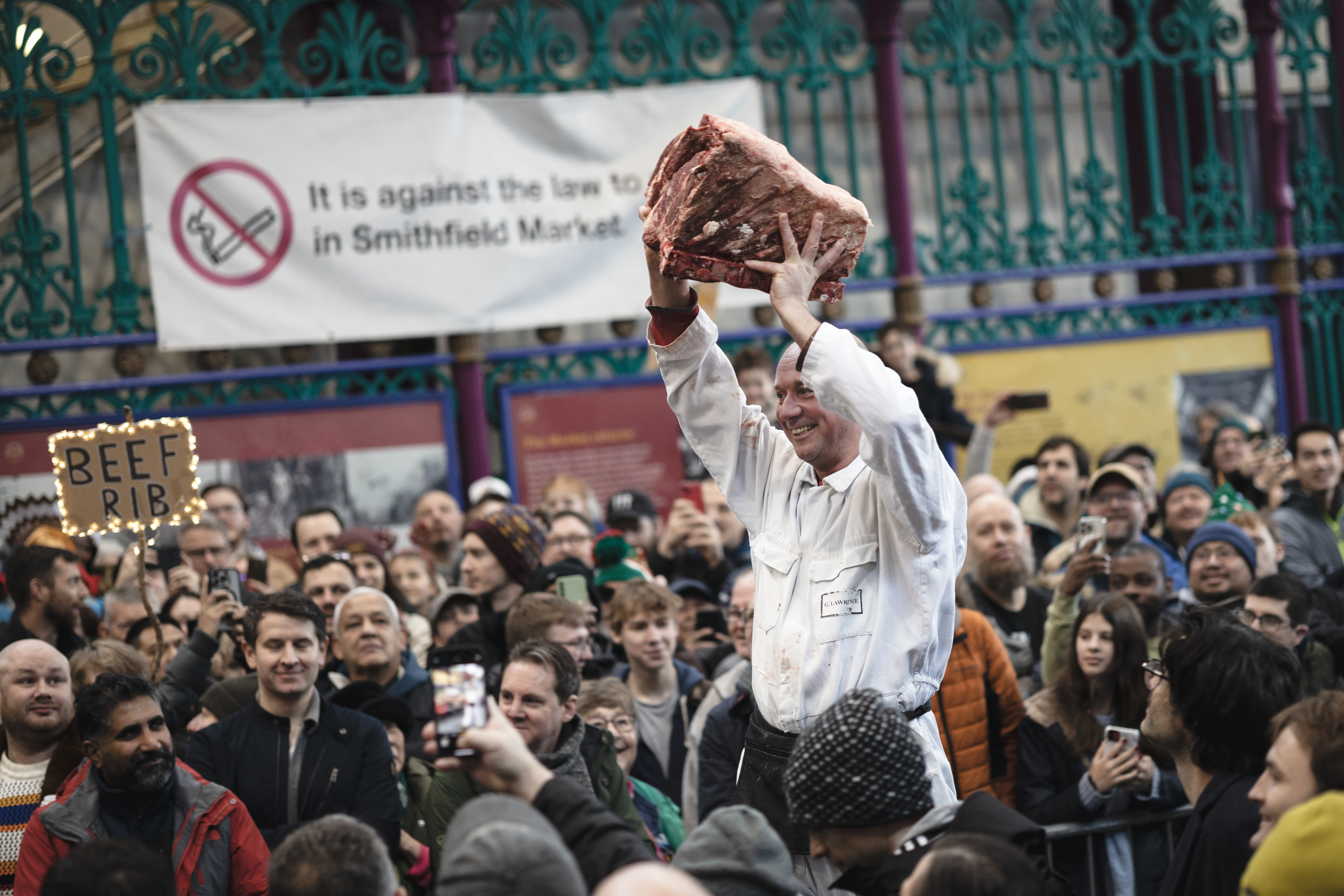
The meat auction in December 2024

The Smithfield Market Christmas Eve meat auction is an annual holiday tradition in London. Every year, buyers visit the historic London market to buy surplus cuts of meat in cash-only bargain transactions. It is a tradition that spans back to 1327, a pre-refrigeration era when meat had to be sold quickly or risk going bad.

The event is known for its festive atmosphere, with people showing up in Santa hats and Christmas-themed sweaters and others waving wads of cash.
