= Miglia Quadrato =

Treasure hunt in London

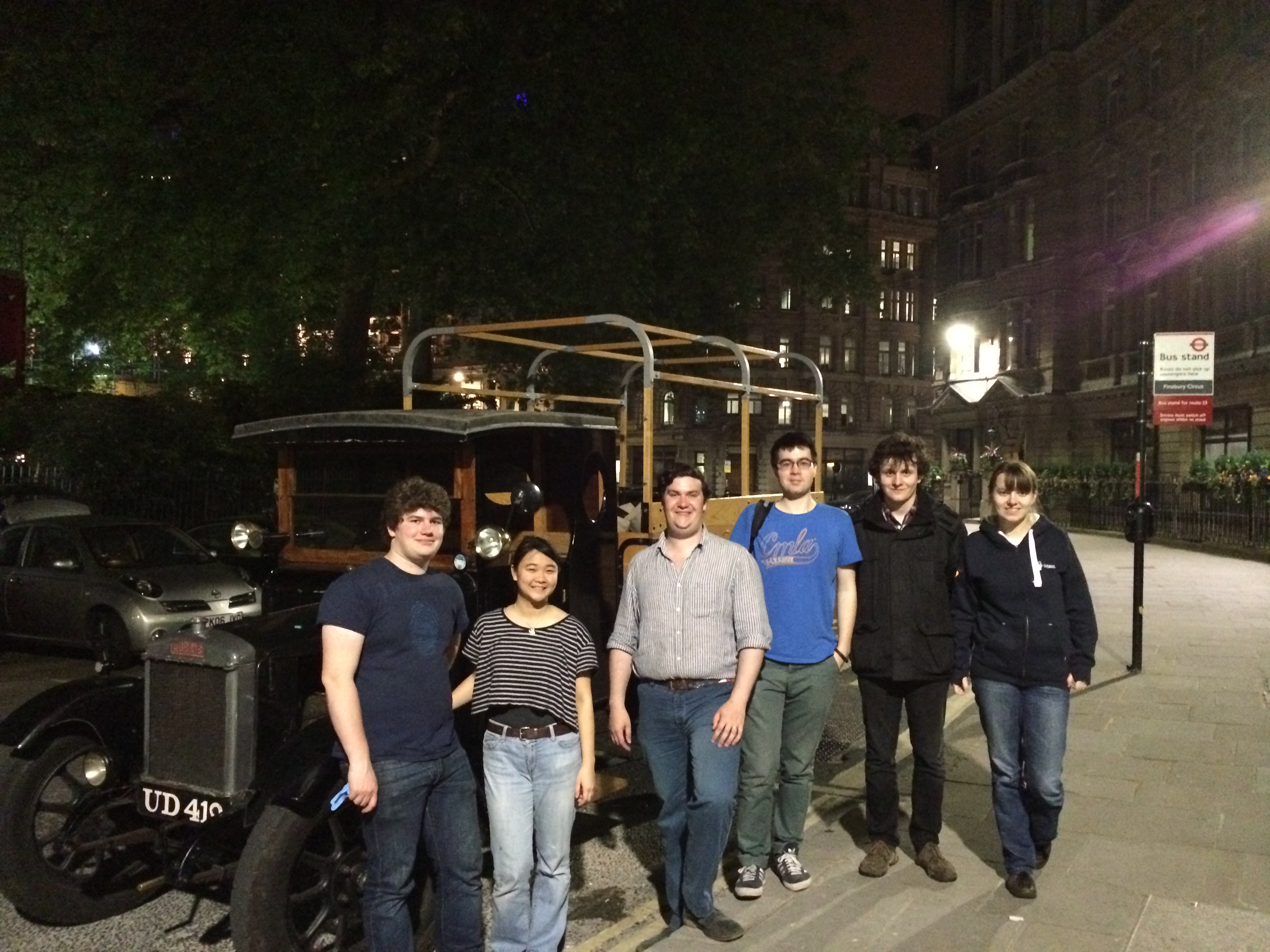
A team from Imperial College London competing on a vintage 1926 Morris T-type one-ton truck in the 54th Miglia Quadrato.

The Miglia Quadrato (lit. 'Square Mile', a reference to its location) was an annual car treasure hunt which took place on the second or third weekend in May within the City of London. It was organised by the United Hospitals and University of London Motoring Club (UHULMC). The event ran most years between 1957 and 2019.

== History ==
The event was originally conceived in 1957 in response to the fuel shortages from the Suez Crisis. This meant that traditional car rallying was less viable due to fuel shortages and so concentrating a competition in the City of London would reduce distances covered.

In the early 1990s the ring of steel was introduced to the City of London. This added a degree of complexity to navigation of the event, as it resulted in a limited number of entry and exit points for areas bordering Liverpool Street Station.

In 2024, having run the last event pre-COVID, in 2019, the organizers announced the event would not resume.

== Format ==
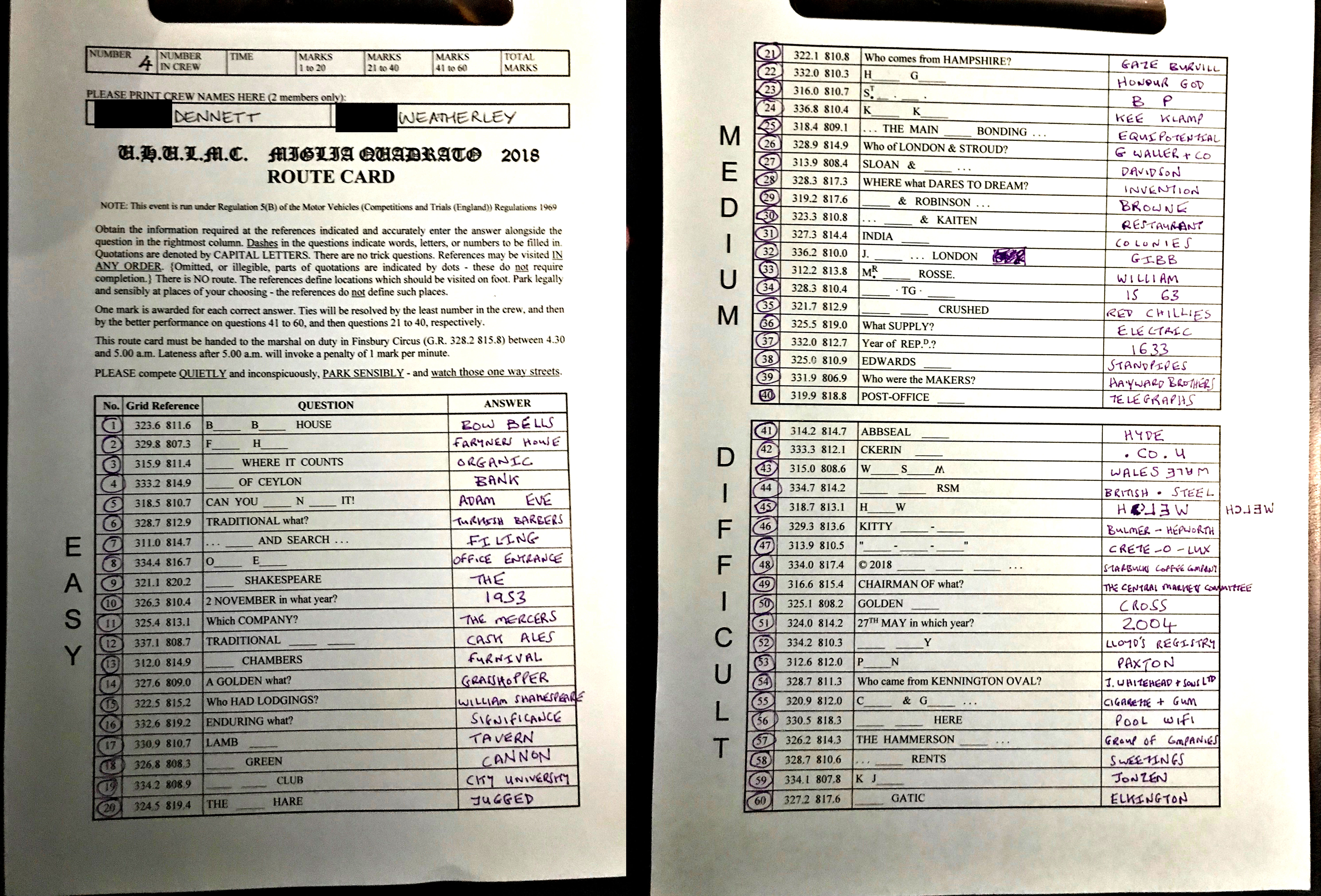
Both sides of the winning 'Route Cards' and answer sheet for the penultimate event in 2018.

Teams of up to six people drove around the city for five hours trying to find the answers to sixty clues. A point was scored for each clue answer correctly recorded, and a point was lost for every minute the team was late at the end of the five hours. A reduced scale map based on the 1:10 000 scale Ordnance Survey Landplan map of the City was provided, along with a sheet of the sixty clues. Each clue was an eight digit Ordnance Survey grid reference (which defines a 10 m by 10 m area to search) and a quotation of some text or number that can be found at the location, with some parts missing, which need to be found and written down as the answer.

The hunt ran from midnight to 5am the following Sunday. With sixty clues to solve in five hours, there was an average of five minutes per clue, in which time the location must be plotted on the map, driven to, and the relevant text from the clue found. The clues could be visited in any order. There were 20 easy, 20 medium and 20 difficult clues.

Engraved plaques were awarded to the highest scoring teams. In a typical year, the winning score was in the mid-fifties, though in 2019 it was as low as 41 and in 2018 a clean sheet of 60 was achieved for the first and only time. Ties were separated by team size (smallest wins) and then by relative scores for the difficult and medium clues respectively.

== Location ==
The City has a small resident population, most of whom live in the Barbican, which has strictly separated pedestrian and vehicle circulation. The hunt avoided the Barbican and the hospitals to avoid disturbing residents. The event's finishing point was normally Finsbury Circus.

There is a continuing sister event called the Londinium Pedo, which is a three-hour event taking place on foot in September or October. Like the Miglia Quadrato, it is run by the United Hospitals and University of London Motoring Club (UHULMC).

== Cancelled events and winding-up ==
In 2001, the event was cancelled in recognition of the need to reduce population movement due to an outbreak of foot and mouth disease. The 2012 event was cancelled due to the difficulty of travel in London resulting from preparations for the 2012 Olympic Games. In 2020, the event was cancelled due to the COVID-19 pandemic. It did not resume, with organizers writing to participants in February 2024 announcing the winding up of the event. They cited on-the-night logistical difficulties as the primary reason noting the accumulated effect of, amongst other things, ULEZ (resulting in a surcharge for some older vehicles), parking and traffic restrictions construction works and increased nightlife activity competing for space.
