= Whitehall Dyke =

Coordinates: 51°16′39″N 1°04′10″E

Physical characteristics
- Source
  - location: Harbledown
- Mouth
  - location: Great Stour, Thanington Without near Canterbury
- Length: 5.6 km (3.5 mi)

The Great Stour and other Rivers of Kent

Whitehall Dyke is a tributary of the Great Stour river in Kent, England.

The stream runs from its source near Harbledown, 5.6 kilometres, to the Great Stour at Thanington Without near Canterbury.

The overall condition of the water body was rated as moderate in 2009, but declined to poor overall in 2014.
