= Westgate, Canterbury =

Gatehouse in Canterbury, Kent, England

Coordinates: 51°16′53″N 1°04′33″E

Westgate
- West Gate Towers Museum
- Part of Canterbury city wall
- St Peter's Street, Canterbury, Kent CT1 2BQ
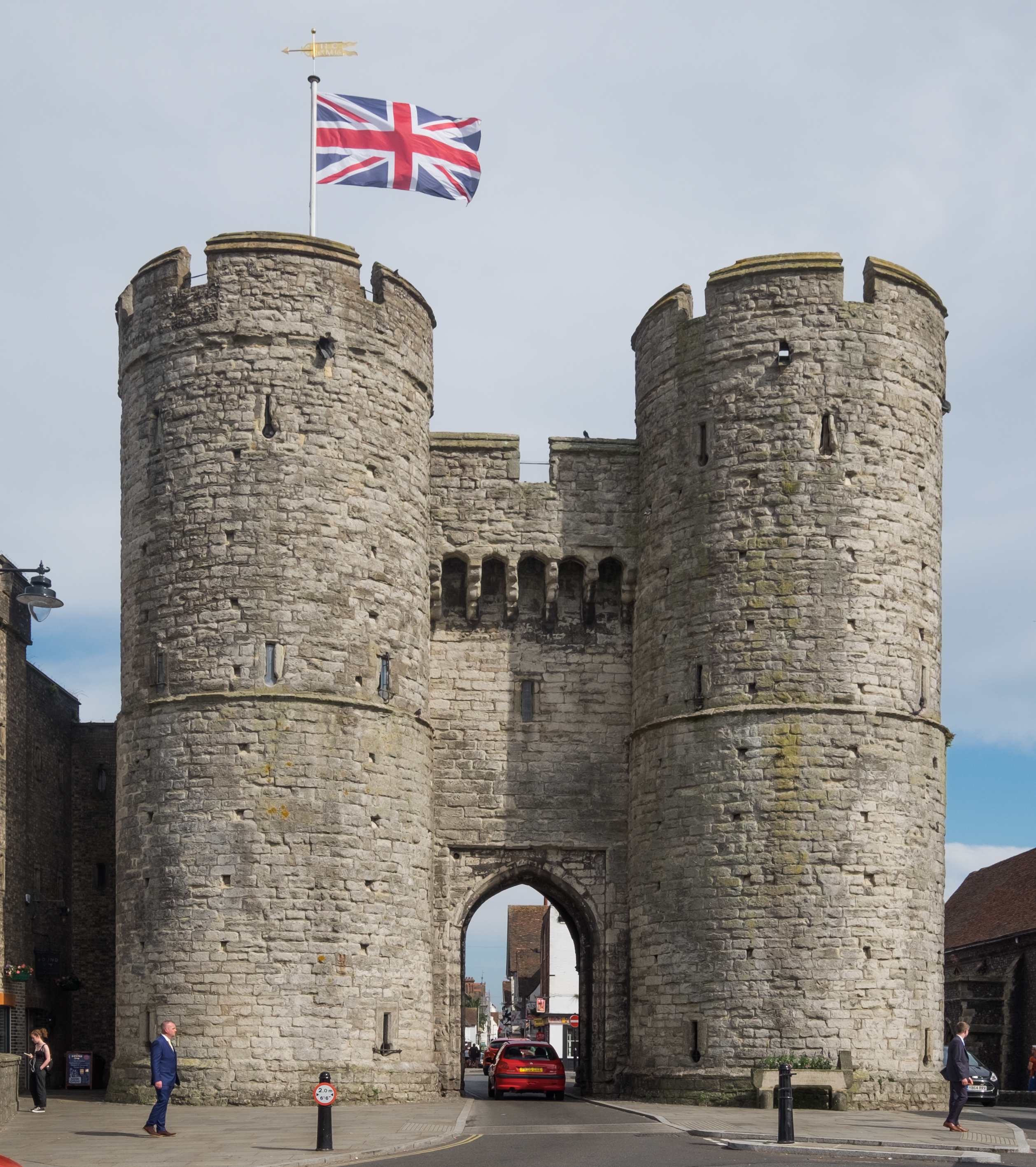
- Westgate

Site information
- Type: Gatehouse
- Owner: Canterbury City Council
- Condition: Well-preserved

Location
- Height: 60 feet (18 m)

Site history
- Built: 1380
- Built by: Archbishop Simon Sudbury
- In use: 1380−present
- Materials: Kentish ragstone

The Westgate is a medieval gatehouse in Canterbury, Kent, England. This 60-foot (18 m) high western gate of the city wall is the largest surviving city gate in England. Built of Kentish ragstone around 1379, it is the last survivor of Canterbury's seven medieval gates, still well-preserved and one of the city's most distinctive landmarks. The road still passes between its drum towers. This scheduled monument and Grade I listed building houses the West Gate Towers Museum as well as a series of historically themed escape rooms.

== History ==
=== 4th–18th centuries ===
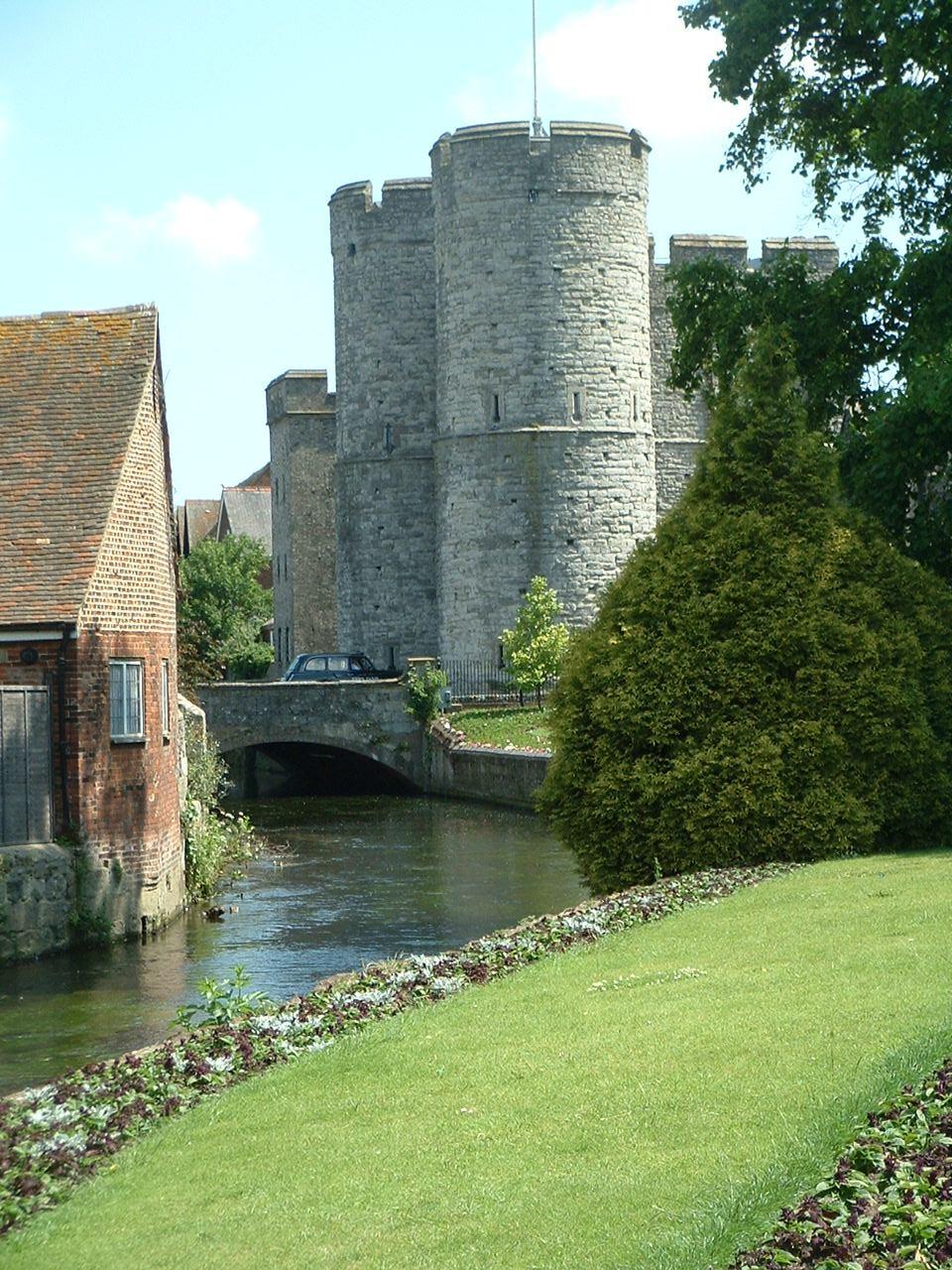
External view, next to the River Stour

Canterbury was walled by the Romans around 300 AD. This has been consistently the most important of the city's gates, as it is the London Road entrance and the main entrance from most of Kent. The present towers are a medieval replacement of the Roman west gate, rebuilt around 1380. There was a gate here at the time of the Norman conquest, which is thought to have been Roman. From late Anglo-Saxon times it had the Church of the Holy Cross on top, but both church and gate were dismantled in 1379, and the gate was rebuilt by Archbishop Simon Sudbury before he died in the Peasants' Revolt of 1381. It has been suggested that it was built primarily as an entrance for pilgrims visiting the shrine of St Thomas Becket at the cathedral. However the rebuild as a defensive status symbol was paid for partly by Sudbury and partly by taxation for military protection against expected raids by the French.

In 1453 Henry VI permitted the Mayor and Commonality to keep a jail at the Westgate, so the building was Canterbury's prison from the 15th to the 19th century, while Canterbury Castle was the county jail. In January 1648, after the Christmas Day riot, Parliamentarians burnt down all the wooden doors of the city's gates. They were all replaced in 1660, but these replacements were removed at the end of the eighteenth century. They were similar to the surviving wooden Christ Church gates at the cathedral. After repairs to the Westgate and jail in 1667, a pound was built on the north side for the hail; this is now gone, but Pound Lane remains. The guard rooms, heavily wood-lined in the eighteenth century, became cells for both debtors and criminals, and the room over the arch became the condemned cell with the portcullis now laid on top. Until 1775 there was a grated cage in the prison gateway, where certain prisoners were allowed to beg for alms and speak with passers by. Capital punishment was normally the gallows, plus the stake at Wincheap for religious martyrs in the time of Queen Mary.

=== 19th–21st centuries ===
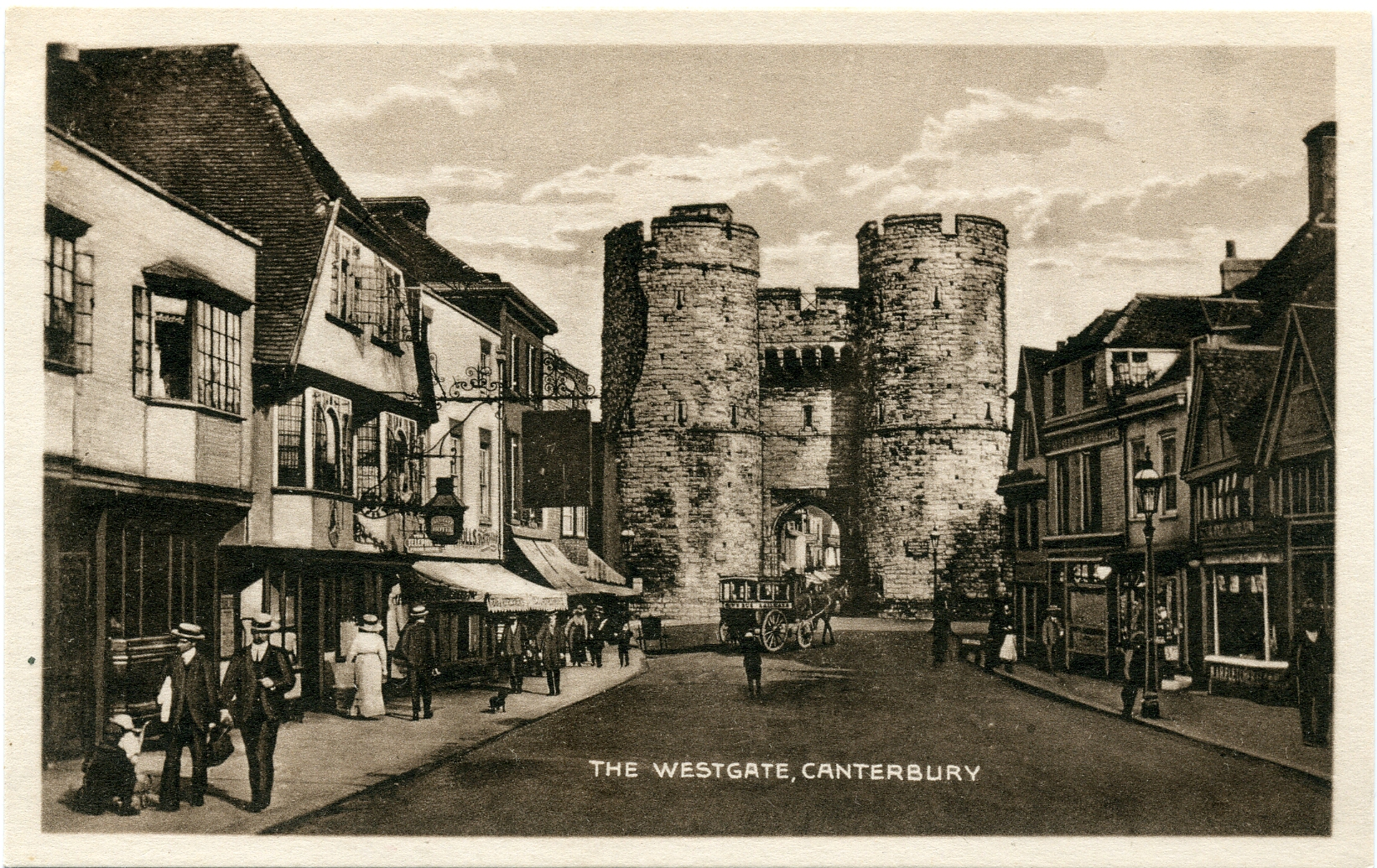
Westgate Towers in the Edwardian era

In the 19th century, the city walls that joined the gateway to the back of the drum towers were removed. Following this, in 1823–1829, a jailer's house was built on the north side, and this became the headquarters of Canterbury City Police. It is now a bar and cafe, whose dining room is still known as "The Parade Room", with a police truncheon used as its badge. The disused iron bridge which connects the Westgate with the bar and cafe dates from this time. Contemporary with this work was the building of St Peter's Place on the south side of the Westgate, along with passages around the Westgate and a new road across the Stour, to cope with increased traffic. At the end of the 19th century the Westgate was used as a temporary repository for the city archives, and a museum was opened in the gatehouse in 1906.

In 2009–10, Canterbury City Council considered closing the museum, now called the Westgate Towers Museum, which proved to be a controversial option. An additional year's funding was made available to give time to examine alternative operating models, and in 2011 the museum was reopened by Charles Lambie, the chairman of the trustees of Canterbury Archaeological Trust, who intended to build an extension to the building focusing on the penal history of Westgate. Lambie died in 2012, having invested £1 million in the project, causing the closure of the museum and generating fresh questions about the building's future. In 2014, the council agreed to assign the lease to the One Pound Lane company, who stated that they intended to reopen the existing museum and develop a restaurant and bar in the premises. The Westgate reopened to the public on 3 August 2015.

In the 21st century, Westgate is the largest surviving city gate in England. The gateway is protected under UK law as a Grade I listed building, and a trial to ban road traffic from passing through the gate was undertaken in 2012.

== Architecture ==
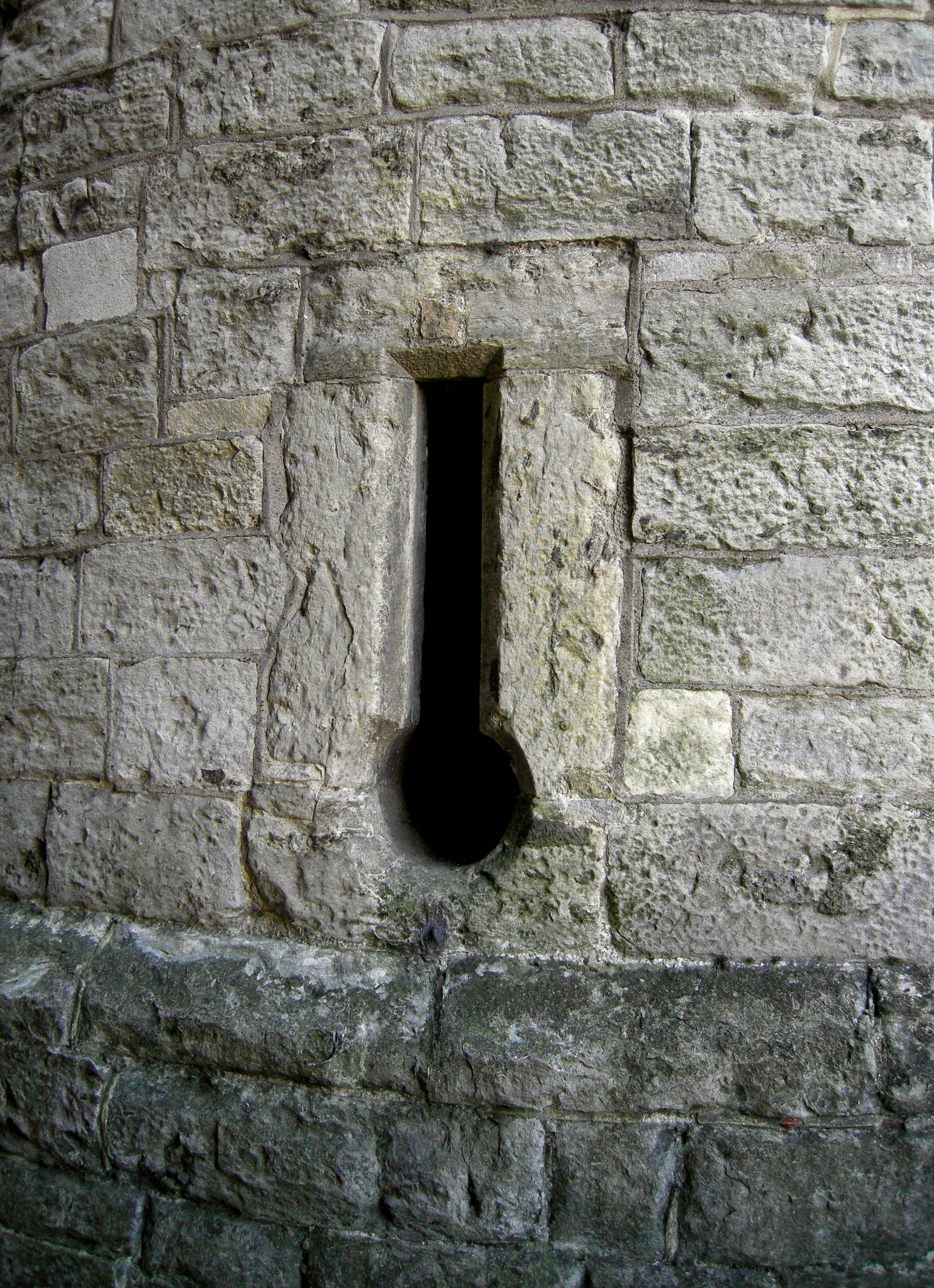
North tower gunloop

The gatehouse is expensively faced in coursed ashlar of Kentish ragstone. It has battered plinths to drum towers, battlements, machicolations and eighteen gunloops: a high number for a gateway, and among the earliest gunholes in Britain. The gunloops would have been added by the beginning of the fifteenth century. It had a drawbridge over the Stour, a portcullis and wooden doors.

The gateway has three floors. The ground floor was designed so that the gateway and vaulted passage had entrances to the towers on each side. Each tower had a ground-floor room with fireplace and four gunloops. The north tower's ground-floor room had a spiral staircase to upper floors. The first floor contains a large room with fireplace and, originally, the portcullis mechanism over the vaulted entranceway. This room had doors to the upper room of each tower, each with fireplace and three gunloops, and a northern door to a spiral staircase leading to the roof. Repairs were carried out due to an invasion scare during the 1470s and 1480s. In 1491 or 1492 a large, two-light, transomed, perpendicular east window was added to the large first-floor room, with a view towards the cathedral and along St Peter's Street.

The roof over the large first-floor central room has a battlemented parapet walk, originally with access to the tops of both towers and machicolations, as well as to the two low chambers, each with two gunports, in the tops of both towers. This part of the tower was less well-built than the lower storeys, either due to haste during the Peasants' Revolt or because it was built later. Between 1793 and 1794 the hall over the gate was split into three and the present square lantern added to the roof, along with the wooden doors and cell linings which are visible today; the cost was £400.

== Museum exhibits ==
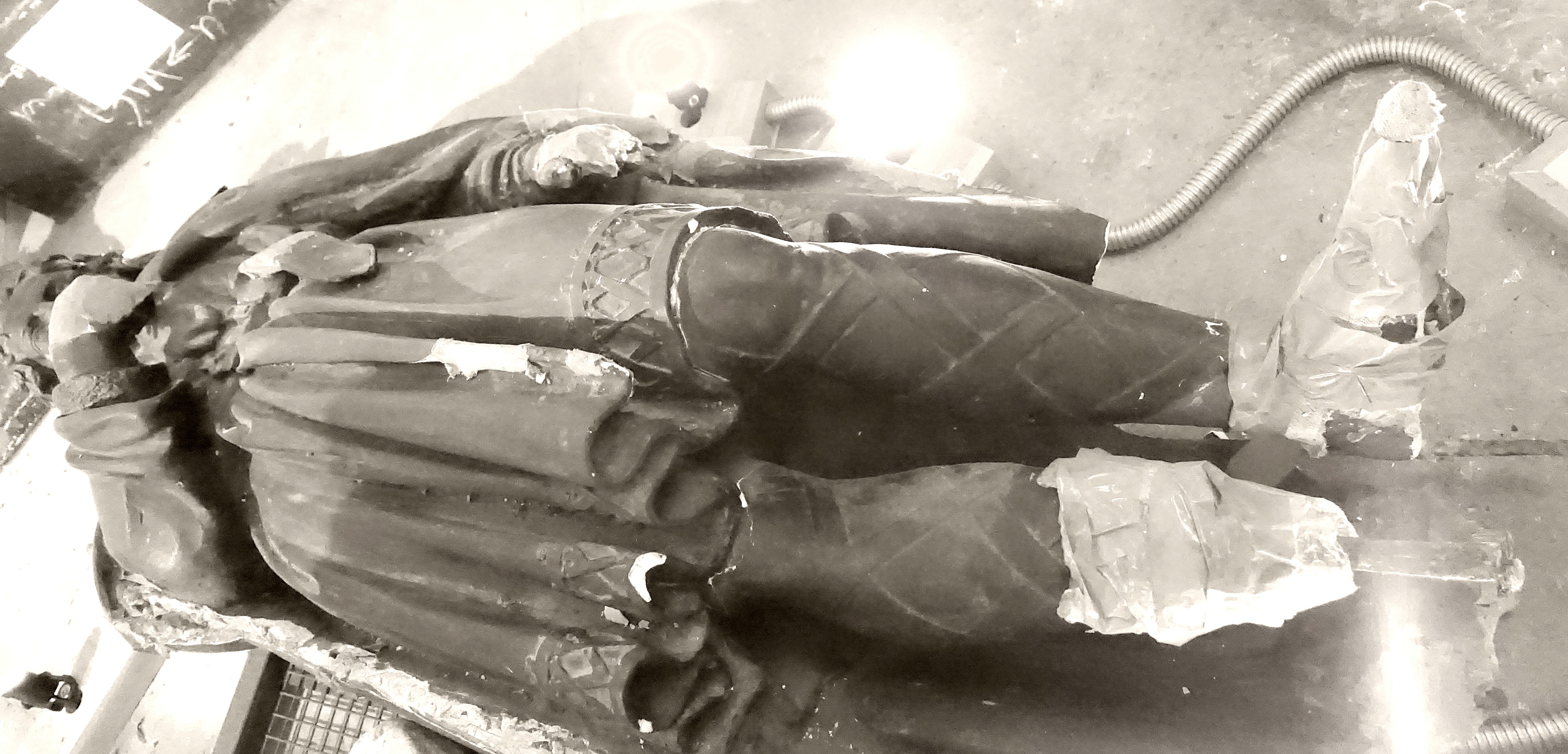
Maquette of Eustace de Vesci, severely damaged in the 2008 flood and lying on the floor of a basement room

These are 17 six-foot, painted, plaster-cast maquettes for the sixteen bronze barons and two bishops which today stand in the Lords Chamber at Westminster Palace, cast in 1847−1851. These were made by various named sculptors, and represent the men who signed Magna Carta. Each of the fifteen barons and two bishops is named at the base. In 1908 three of the maquettes were displayed in the museum, (Note: See these three maquettes in the scan of the original museum postcard below) and two remained on show at the Westgate in 2013. The rest were put into storage in the ground floor room of the north tower in 1987, along with several other museum exhibits, where they were forgotten until they were rediscovered by museum staff in May 2008 when the building was flooded. Most of them are still there. (Note: Information from records at the Museum of Canterbury) As of May 2011, ten of the maquettes in the basement had been photographed; the fate of the remaining five was unknown.

The sculptors of the maquettes are as follows: John Thomas who made the maquette of Stephen Langton, (Note: The label on the maquette says "John Thomas") as of 2013 in Canterbury Heritage Museum and as of 2021 in The Beaney; Patrick MacDowell; Henry Timbrell; James Sherwood Westmacott; J. Thorneycroft (possibly Thomas Thornycroft); Frederick Thrupp; Alexander Handyside Ritchie; and William Frederick Woodington. As of 2021, three of the maquettes (Stephen Langton, Thomas Robert Fitzwalter by Frederick Thrupp and Sieur de Quincy by James Westmacott) have been restored and are displayed in The Beaney, Canterbury.

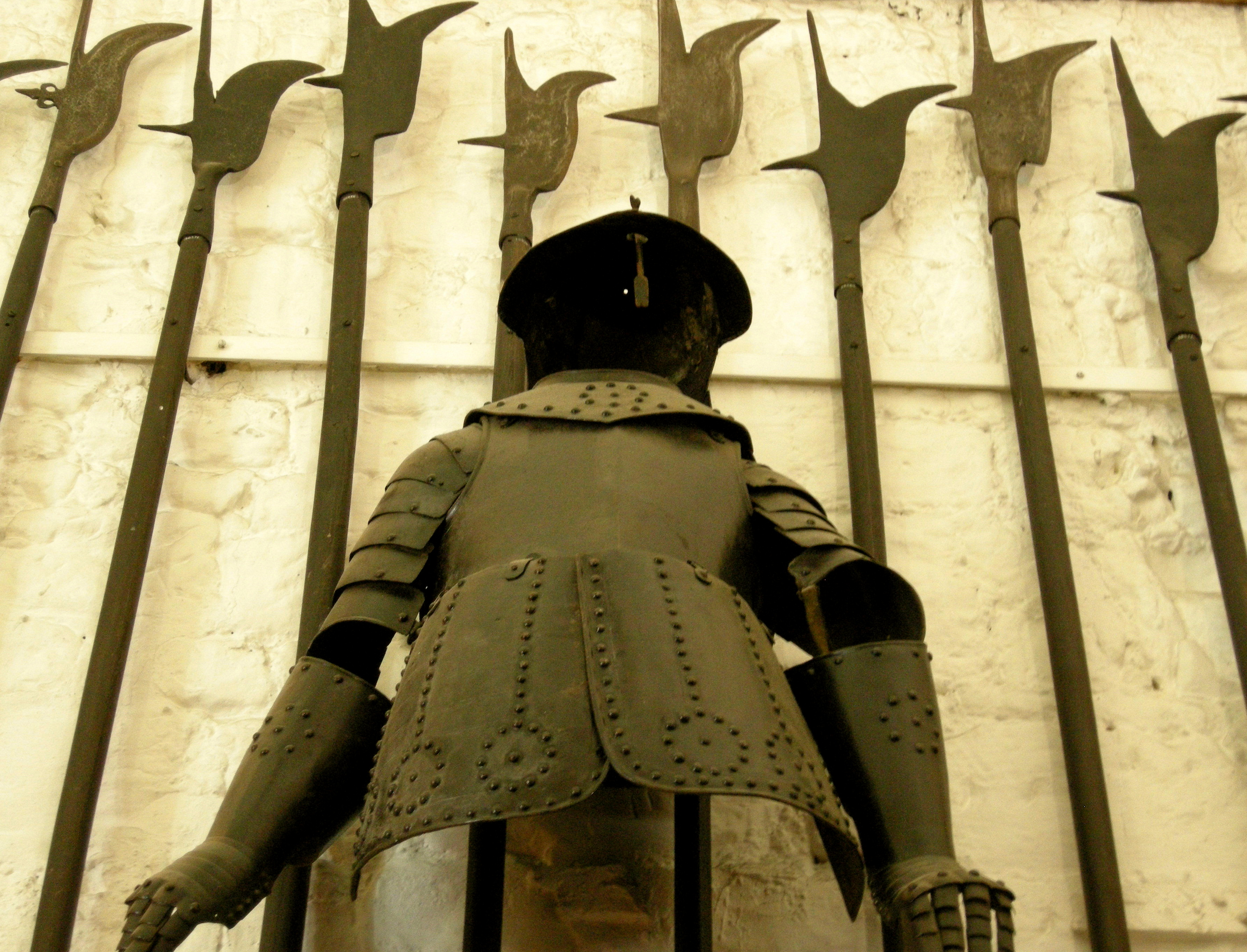
Civil War armour

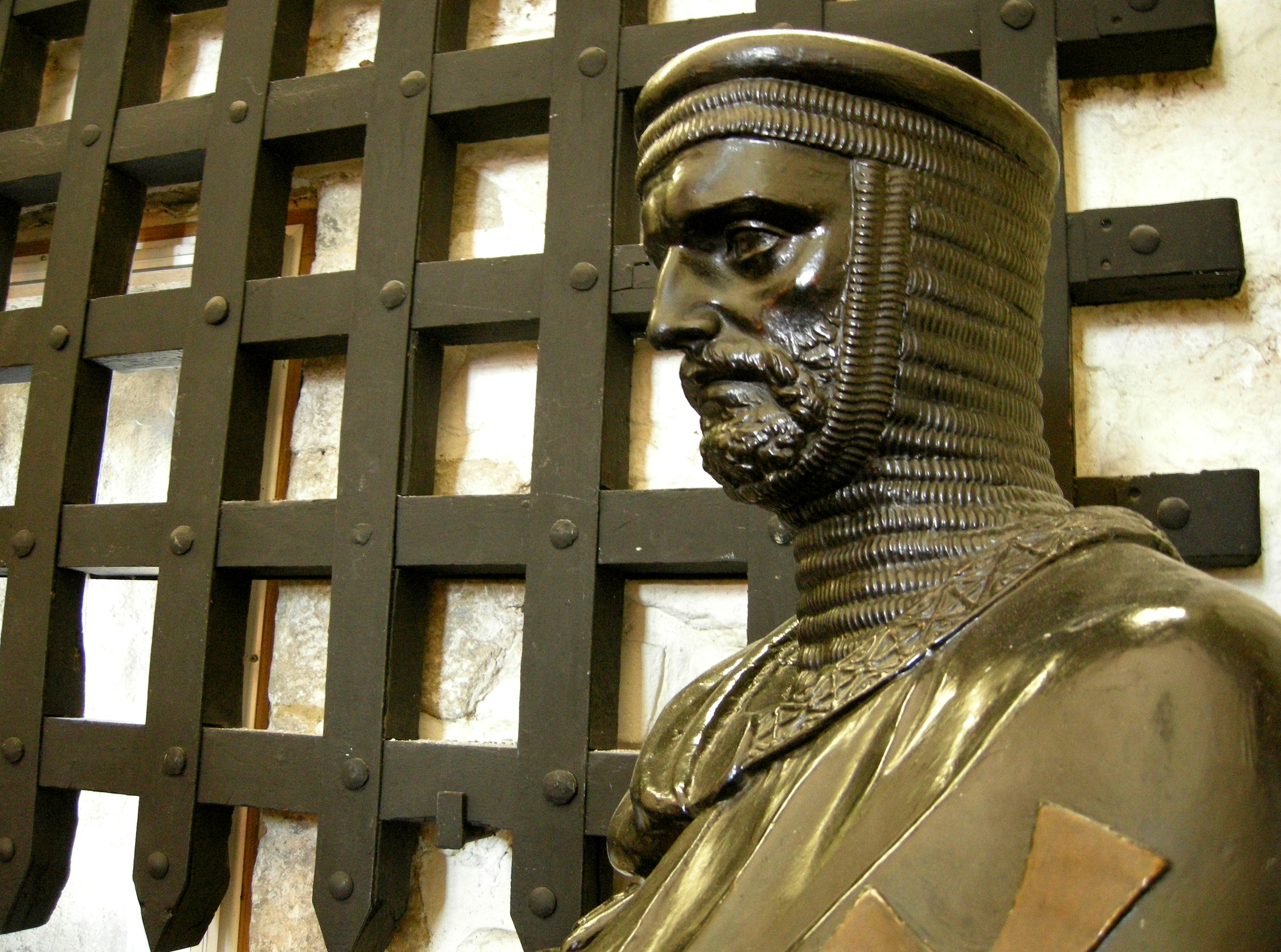
19th-century maquette of Knight Templar St Maur who signed Magna Carta

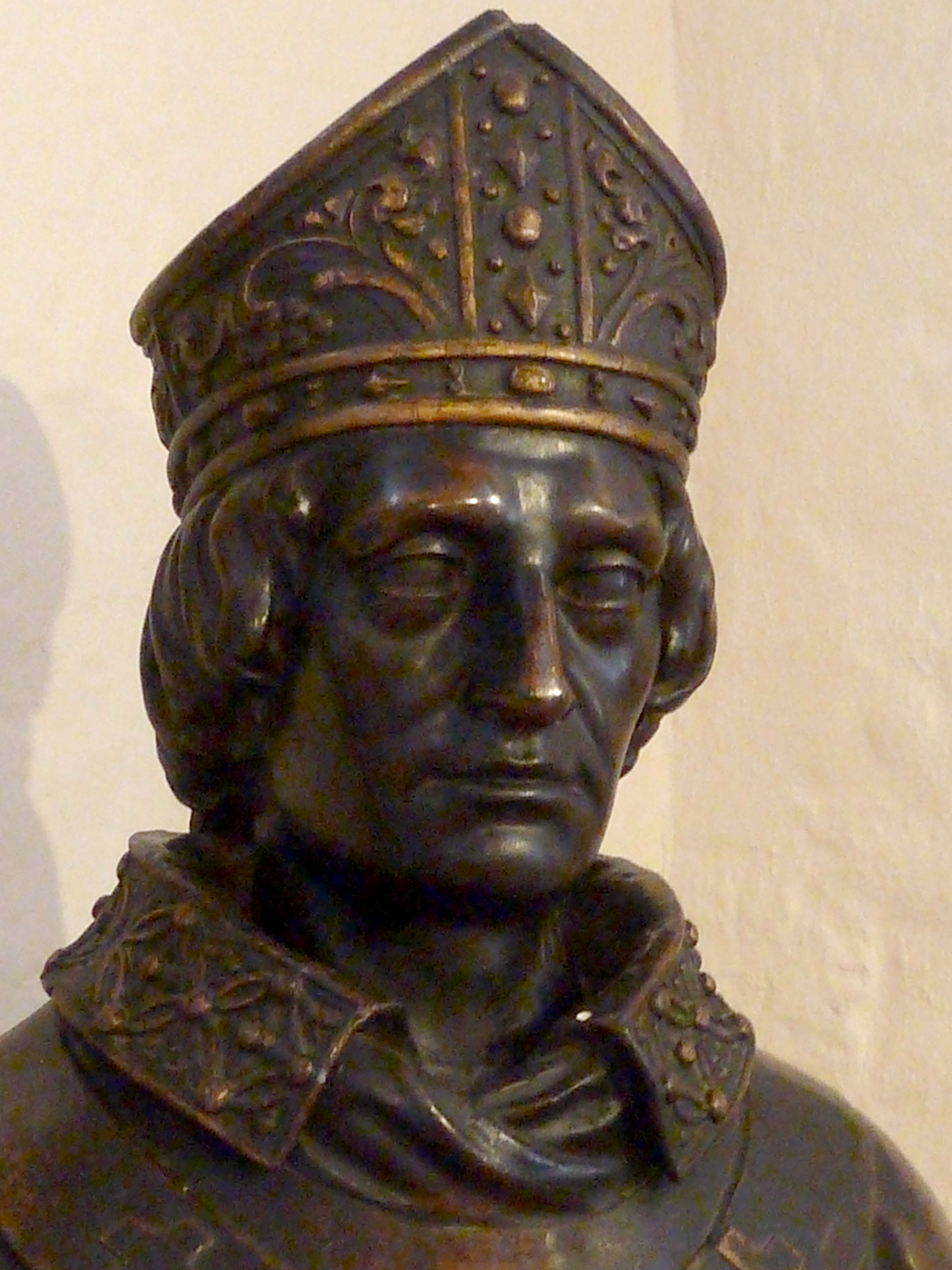
Stephen Langton by John Thomas

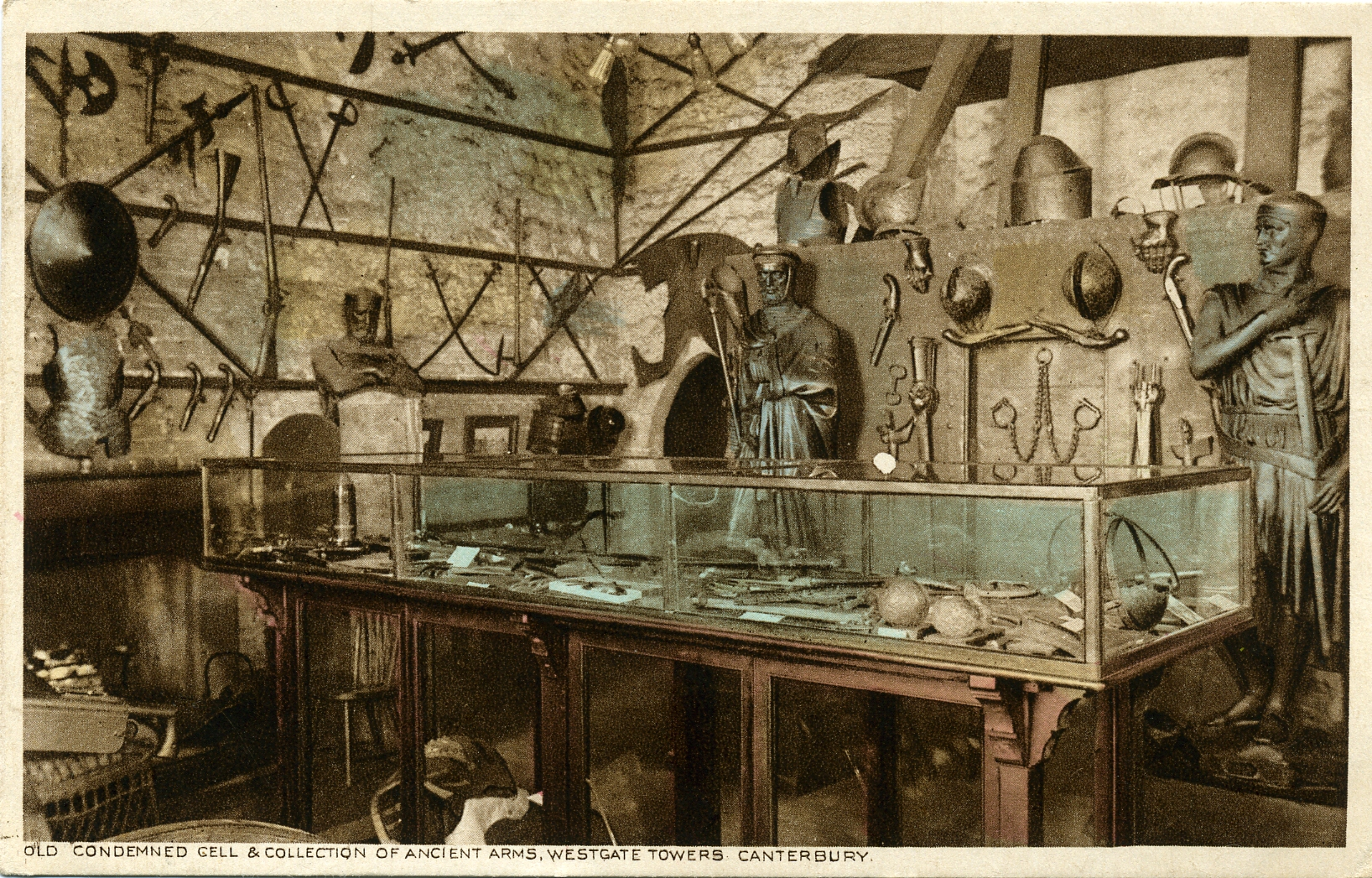
1908 tinted postcard of the museum. One of these three 6-foot (1.8 m) 19th- century figures is now lying damaged in the base of the north tower with the remaining 14 maquettes for the Lords Chamber bronzes

== See also ==
- A Canterbury Tale
- Herne Bay Museum
- Roman Museum
- Westgate Hall, Canterbury
- Whitstable Museum and Gallery

== Bibliography ==
- Urry, William (1948), Canterbury Mayoral Quincentenary booklet (historical notes)
- Tatton-Brown, Tim, et al., (1985), The Westgate museum leaflet
