= Canterbury Martyrs =

16th-century English protestant clerics and executees

The Canterbury Martyrs were 16th-century English Protestant martyrs. They were executed for heresy in Canterbury, Kent and were the last Protestants burnt during the reign of Mary I. Their story is recorded in Foxe's Book of Martyrs.

== 1555 ==
On 12 July 1555, John Bland (rector of Adesham), John Frankesh (vicar of Rolvindon), Nicholas Sheterden, and Humphrey Middleton were burnt together. According to Foxe, they "resigned themselves with Christian fortitude, fervently praying that God would receive them into his heavenly kingdom."

On 23 August, William Coker, William Hopper, Henry Laurence, Richard Collier (or Colliar), Richard Wright, and William Stere were burnt.

On 6 September, George Catmer (or Painter) of Hythe, Kent, Robert Streater (or Streter) of Hythe, Kent, Anthony Burward of Calete (possibly Calais), George Brodbridge (or Bradbridge) of Bromfield, Kent, and James Tutty (or Tuttey) of Brenchley, Kent were burnt.

On 30 November, John Webbe (or Web), George Roper, and Gregory Parke (or Paynter) were burnt.

== 1556 ==
On 31 January 1556, John Lomas (or Jhon Lowmas) of Tenterden, Kent, Agnes Snoth (or Annis Snod) of Smarden, Kent, Anne Wright (or Albright) alias Champnes, Joan Sole (or Jone Soale) of Horton, Kent and Joan Catmer of Hythe, Kent were burned alive at the stake in Wincheap, Canterbury. A monument marks the spot on the road now called 'Martyrs Field Road'.

== 1557 ==
On 15 January 1557, Stephen Kempe of Norgate/ Northgate, Canterbury, William Waterer of Biddenden, Kent, William Prowting of Thornham, Kent, William Lowick of Cranbrooke, Kent, Thomas Hudson of Selling, Kent, and William Hay of Hythe, Kent were burnt.

On 19 June, John Fishcock/Jhon Fiscoke, Nicholas White, Nicholas Pardue/Perdue, Barbara Final, Bradbridge's Widow (Witchcraft)(Bradbridge's Wife), probably of Tenterden, Kent and probably the widow of Martin Bradbridge who was burnt on 16 January 1557, (witch craft) (also referred to as 'Wilson's Wife'), and Alice Benden, possibly also referred to as 'Benson's Wife', of Staplehurst (or possibly Cranbrook), Kent were burnt.

== 1558 ==
On 15 November 1558, John Corneford of Wrotham, Kent, Christopher Brown of Maidstone, Kent, John Herst of Ashford, Kent, Alice Snoth, and Katherine Knight/Tynley were burnt.

== See also ==
- List of Protestant martyrs of the English Reformation
