= William Stere =

- Martyr
- Born: Ashford, Kent
- Died: 23rd August 1555 Canterbury, Kent

William Stere was a 16th century Protestant martyr from Ashford. He was executed for heresy in Canterbury, Kent on the 23rd of August 1555. He is one of the Canterbury Martyrs.

== Trial and execution ==
On the 16th of August, he was brought to appear before the judge in the chapter house of Canterbury, and was asked to respond to the accusations of heresy made against him. He replied that the judge should "comaund his dogs, not him" and demanded to know where the authority of "Dicke of Douer" (the Bishop of Dover) came from. He then rejected the papal bulls that were presented to him, declaring that the Archbishop of Canterbury was the rightful diocesan authority. Before the trial he also criticised the sacrament of the altar.

He was then burnt at the stake on the 23rd of August.
