= Richard Wright (martyr) =

- Martyr
- Born: Ashford, Kent
- Died: 23 August 1555 Canterbury, Kent

Richard Wright was a 16th-century English Protestant martyr from Ashford. Executed for heresy in August 1555, he is one of the Canterbury Martyrs.

== Trial and execution ==
He appeared before a judge in the chapter house of Canterbury on the 16th of August 1555. Upon being asked whether he believed in transubstantiation, he was "ashamed to speake of it or to name it" and declared it was not allowed in the church. He was sentenced to burn at the stake on the same day and was executed in Canterbury on the 23rd of August 1555.
