= Wincheap =

Suburb of Canterbury, England

Coordinates: 51.2730°N 1.0704°E

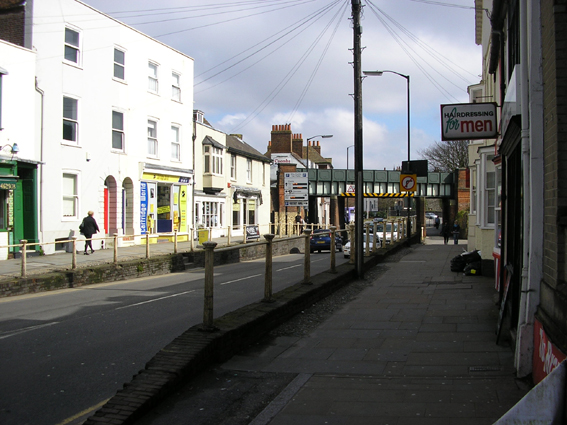

- Location within Kent
- Population: 9,095 (Ward 2011)
- District: City of Canterbury
- Shire county: Kent
- Region: South East
- Country: England
- Sovereign state: United Kingdom
- Post town: Canterbury
- Postcode district: CT1
- Police: Kent
- Fire: Kent
- Ambulance: South East Coast

Wincheap is a road and suburb in Canterbury, Kent, England. The road forms part of the A28 road, stretching for around 1 mile (1.6 km) from the city wall, close by Canterbury East railway station, to the over-crossing of the A2 and the parish of Thanington.

== History ==
There are two theories about the name: either it comes from the Saxon Wenchiape, a wine market, or from Weychep from the old English Waegnceap, indicating a wagon market.

Wincheap originated as an ancient trackway to the east of the River Stour. In Roman Britain it was used for communication between Canterbury and the iron works in the Weald. The modern street was established by the early 13th century; the name is recorded starting in 1226.

Stone Street, the Roman road from Portus Lemanis joins Wincheap at Hollow Lane and is the route used by the knights who murdered Thomas Becket.

Wincheap Gate, since demolished, was one of the entrances in the city walls. A timber market was held halfway along Wincheap in the 13th century, while an annual cherry fair took place on Wincheap Green until the early 19th century. The green was destroyed during construction of the Canterbury Ring Road in the 1960s.

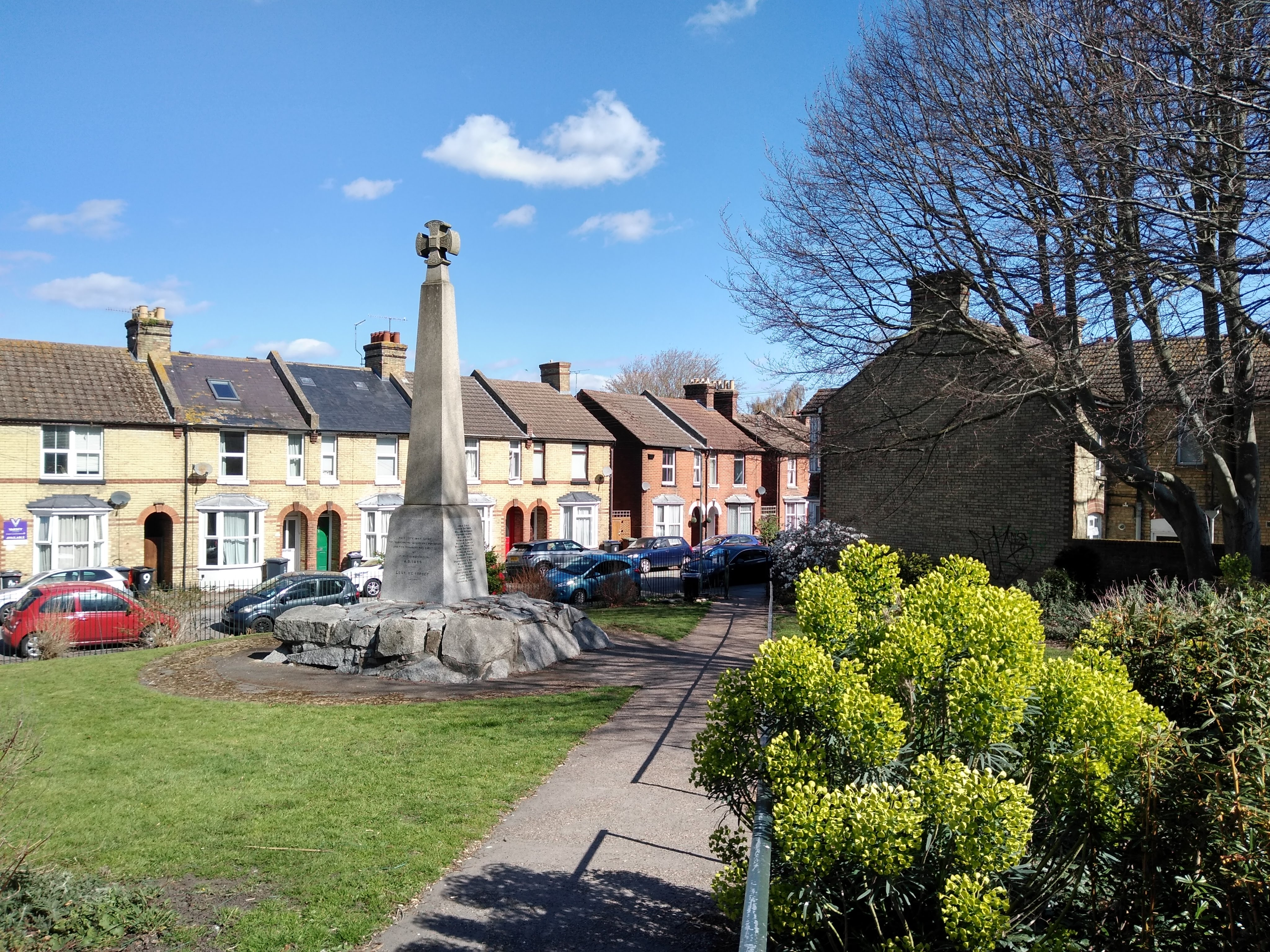
The Martyrs' Monument, Martyrs' Field, Canterbury, Kent UK.

In the 16th century, the Canterbury Martyrs were burned at the stake for heresy in Wincheap. A monument marks the spot on Martyrs Field Road.

Since 1996, most of Wincheap from the railway bridge to the A2 bypass has been marked as a conservation area by the city council. There is a petrol station halfway along the road, which has been criticised for having a negative effect on the area.

At the end of 2021, the council announced plans to make Wincheap one-way southbound, sending northbound traffic via a different route. This plan has not been realised.

== Properties ==
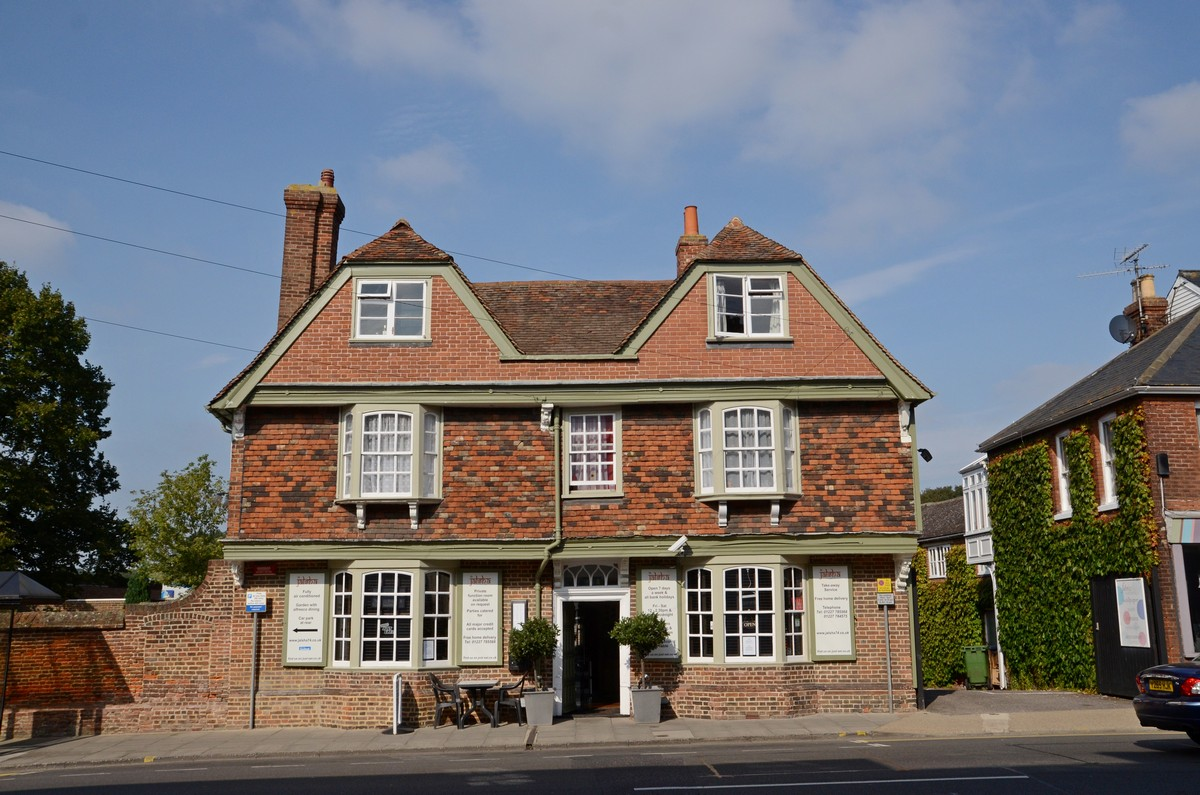
Wincheap House

Nos. 50–52 were constructed in the 18th century and were originally a single house. They are three storeys high and constructed of red brick. They were Grade II listed in 1973.

Wincheap House at No. 74 was constructed in the 16th century. Originally a timber-framed building, it was extensively rebuilt in the 18th century, though the overhang of the top two floors was retained, as was the 16-panelled front door. It is constructed with traditional mathematical tiles. The premises was Grade II listed in 1949.

Nos. 96–116 date from the early 18th century, and are a group of two-storey brick houses that are a mixture of painted, stuccoed and roughcast, included hipped tiled roofs. They were Grade II listed in 1973.

Nos. 160–164 are a terrace of early 19th century red brick houses. No. 160 has a more decorative door than the others. The terrace was Grade II listed in 1973.

The Thanington Hotel is at No. 140. It dates from the early 19th century and is a three-storey building rendered with cement. It was Grade II listed in 1967 along with Nos. 126–136.

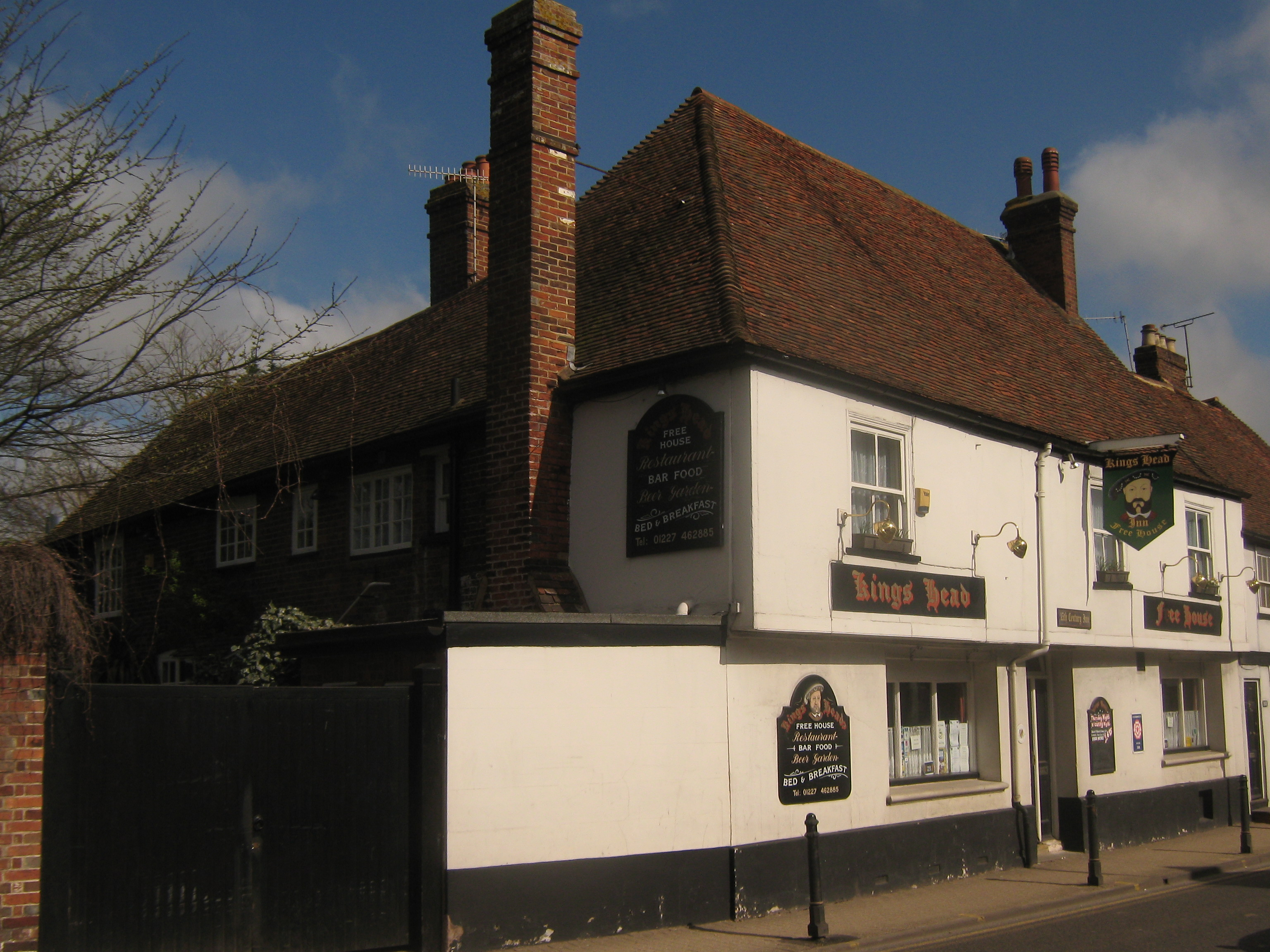
The King's Head

The King's Head Inn at Nos. 198–204 Wincheap was established around the early 15th century and was believed to be the city's oldest continuously trading inn. The timber-framed exterior was re-fronted in the 18th century, preserving the overhang of the first floor. The building includes a tile-hung rear elevation. It was Grade II listed in 1967. The pub closed in May 2022.

The Wincheap Non-Conformist Burial Ground sits alongside the King's Head on the west side of Wincheap. It was established in 1849 and contains 281 graves; the last burial occurred in 1962. It was restored in 1997 and financed by the National Lottery Heritage Fund.

Nos. 268–274 form a terrace of red brick houses. They were constructed in 1771.

The Hospital of St James by Canterbury was based at the southern edge of Wincheap where the road meets Thanington. It was established in the 12th century for female lepers, and maintained by three priests. It survived the dissolution of similar hospitals during the reign of Henry VIII, and closed on 28 February 1551 under the reign of Edward VI. All premises and all possessions were surrendered to the crown.

The Thanington Pumping Station was based at the edge of the conservation area at the southeast part of Wincheap. It opened in 1869 and was designed by Samuel Collett Homersham. It was demolished in the 1990s and replaced with a small retail park.

A telephone box at the north end of Wincheap by the railway bridge was Grade II listed in 1989. It was built in 1935 by Sir Giles Gilbert Scott and constructed from cast iron.

== Landscape ==
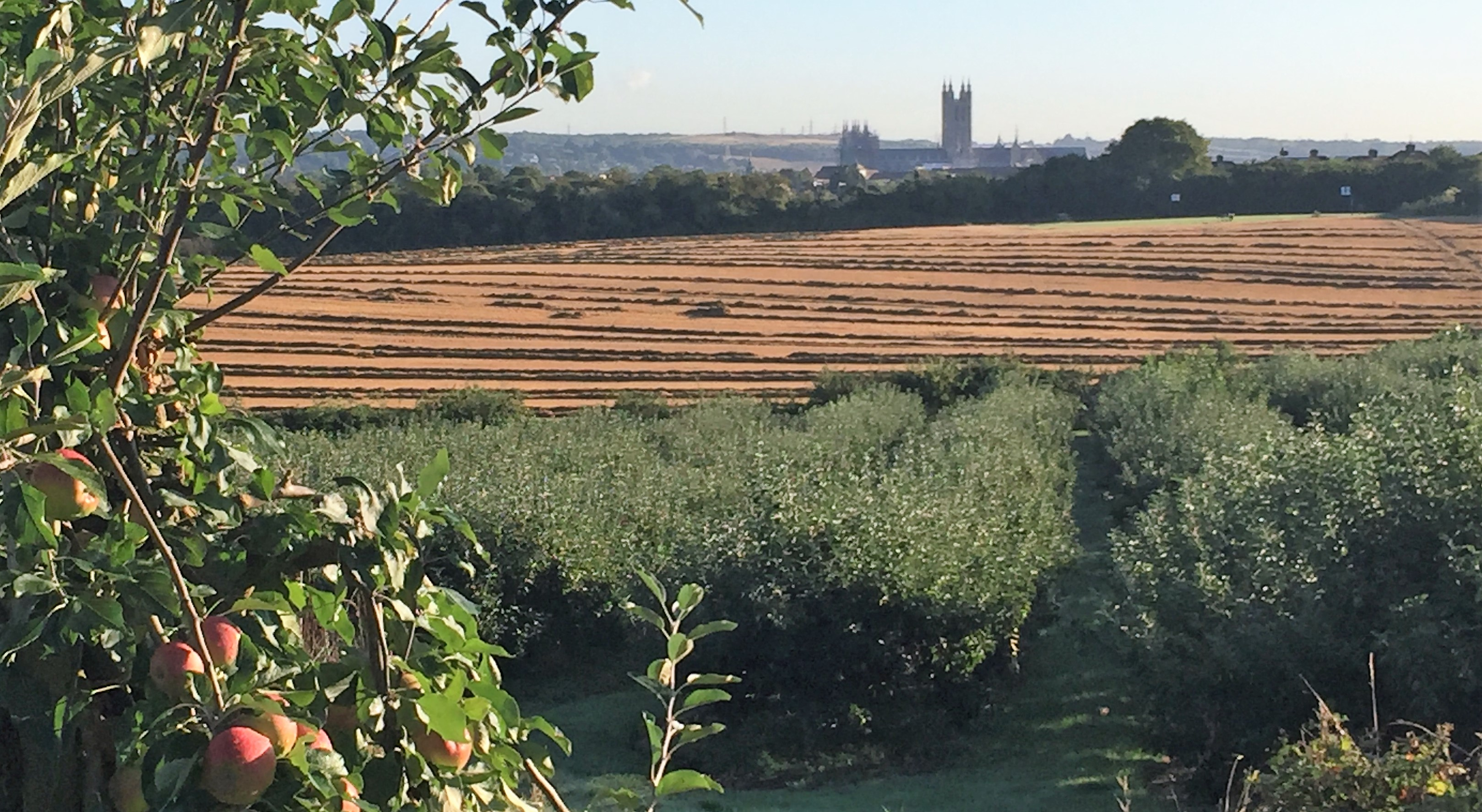
View of Canterbury Cathedral from Wincheap Orchards

Wincheap's apple and pear orchards and ancient public footpaths provide views of Canterbury Cathedral from the south of the city. The footpaths form part of the Canterbury Middle Ring trail.

The area is rich in biodiversity with several endangered species of bird such as the Eurasian starling and the common linnet foraging among the trees. Tree roundels in the fields off Stuppington Lane provide important habitat for birds and insects.

Cooper's Pit, on the edge of the area, is a fine example of inland Upper Chalk and is protected as a Regionally Important Geological Site.

== Local amenities ==
There are 60 allotments off Norfolk Road.

There is a play park on Wincheap, a play area off Hollow Lane and smaller playgrounds at Chineham Way, Nunnery Fields, and Manor Court Flats. A five-a-side kick about area was created at the top of Lime Kiln Road for the children of Wincheap and South Canterbury in 1994.

== Education ==
Wincheap has three schools: Wincheap Foundation Primary School on Hollow Lane; The Orchard Foundation Special School on Cambridge Road; and St Nicholas's School, a school for children with profound and multiple learning difficulties, on Holm Oak Close.

== Industrial estate ==
The Wincheap Industrial Estate is a trading park, which runs parallel to Wincheap. In 1996, it was extended to include a retail park and a park and ride near the A28/A2 junction. A footpath behind the industrial estate runs alongside the River Stour and is accessible via the Horses and Goats Tunnel.

== Gallery ==
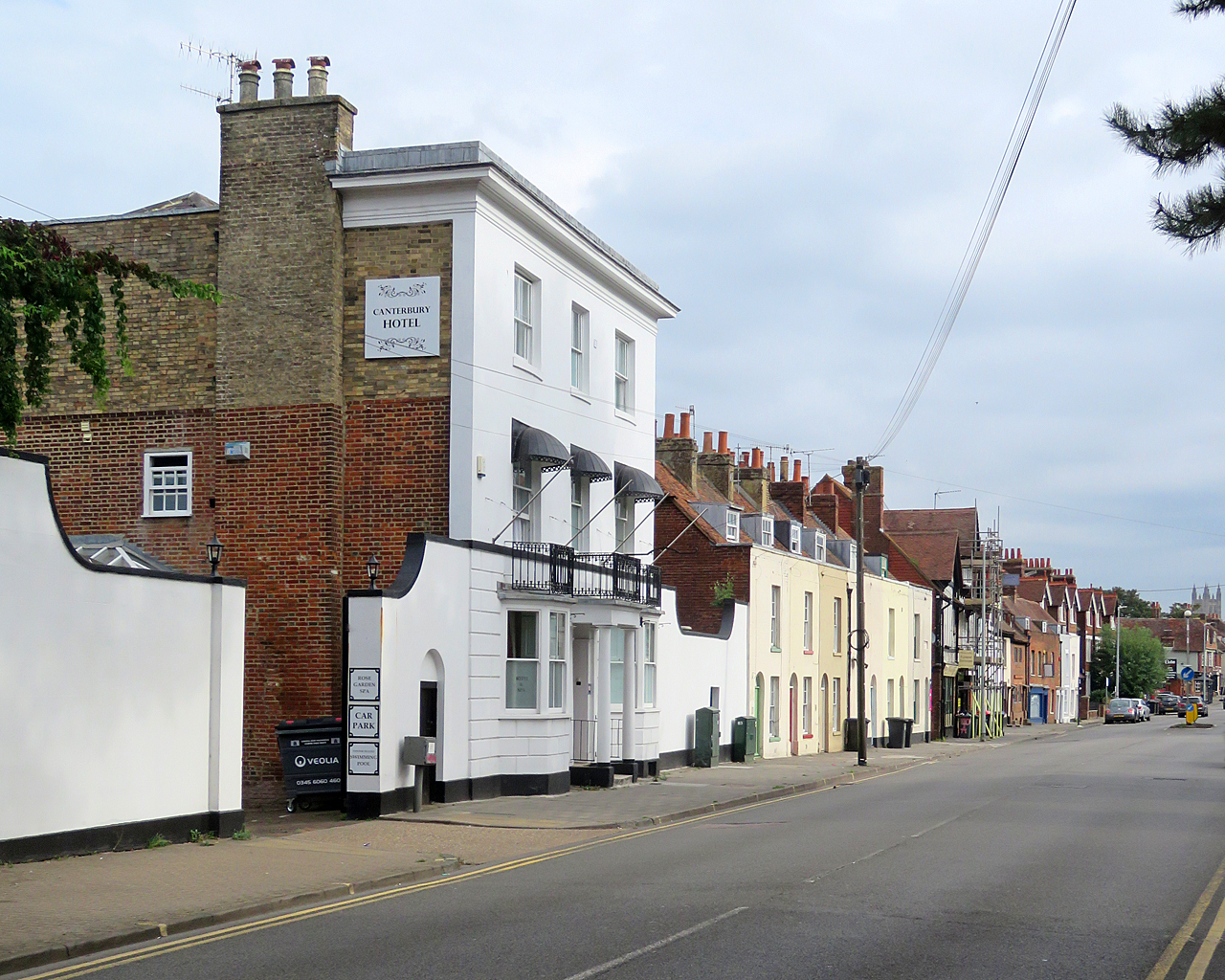
Wincheap and the Canterbury Hotel

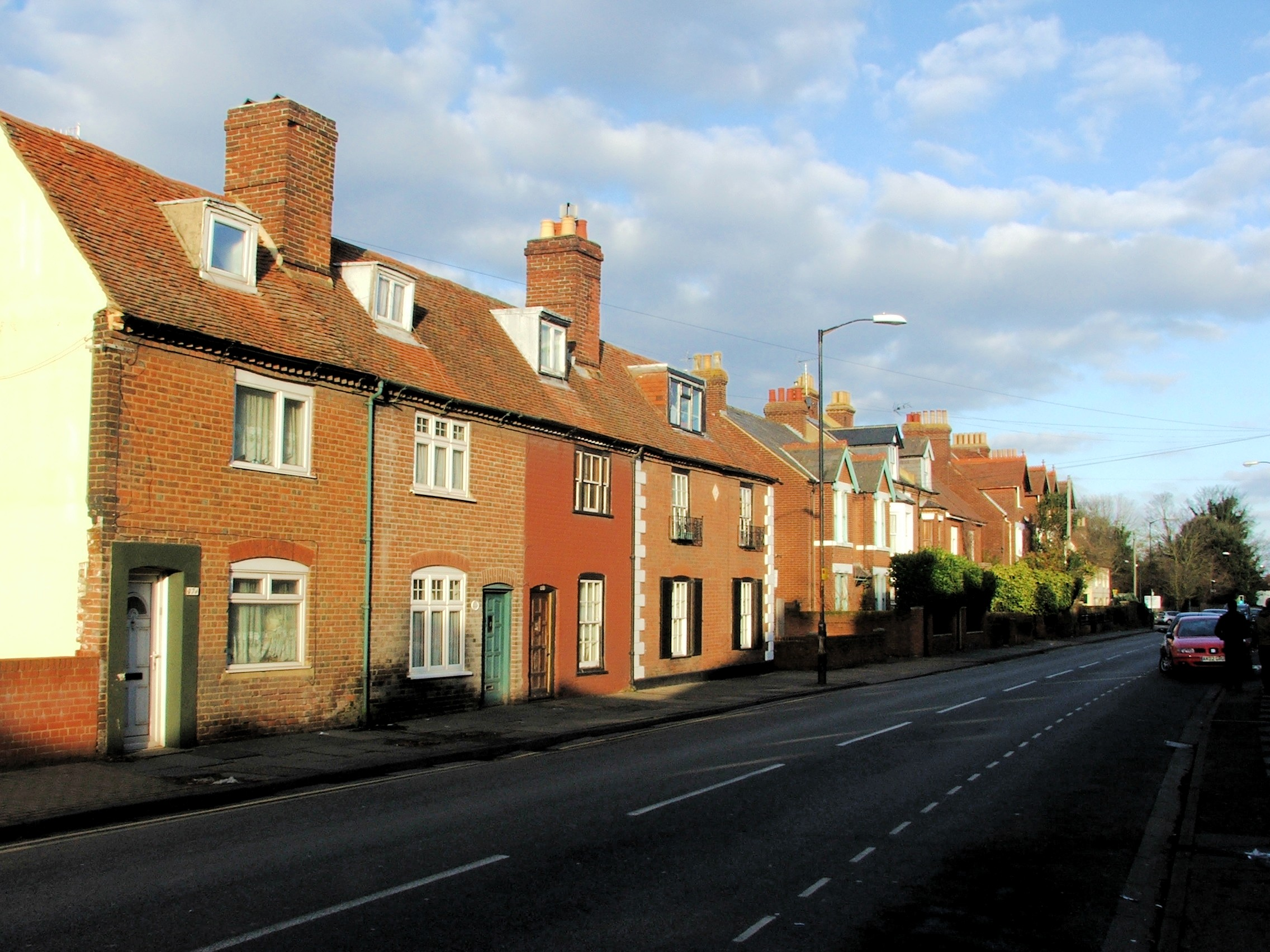
Wincheap, Canterbury

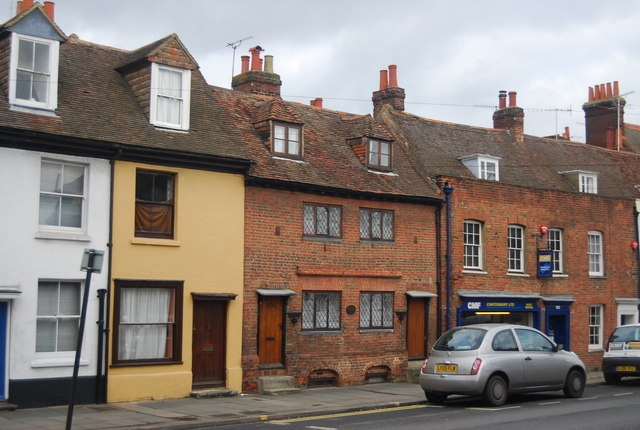
Listed buildings, Wincheap

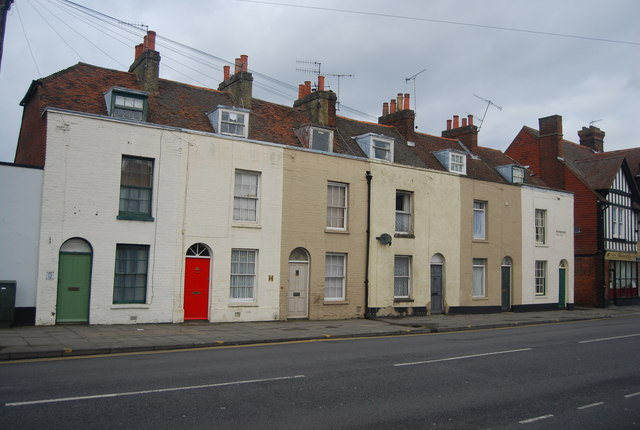
Terraced houses, Wincheap
