= Listed buildings in Thanington Without =

Civil Parish in Kent, England

Thanington Without is a village and civil parish in the City of Canterbury district of Kent, England. It contains eight listed buildings that are recorded in the National Heritage List for England. Of these three are grade II* and five are grade II.

This list is based on the information retrieved online from Historic England.

== Key ==
Grade	Criteria
I	Buildings that are of exceptional interest
II*	Particularly important buildings of more than special interest
II	Buildings that are of special interest

== Listing ==
Name	Grade	Location	Type	Completed (Note: The date given is the date used by Historic England as significant for the initial building or that of an important part in the structure's description.)	Date designated	Grid ref. (Note: The grid reference is based on the British national grid reference system, sometimes known as OSGB36, used by the Ordnance Survey.) Geo-coordinates	Notes	Entry number (Note: The "List Entry Number" is a unique number assigned to each listed building and scheduled monument by Historic England.)	Image	Wikidata
Barn at Milton Manor	II	Ashford Road, Milton Manor			14 March 1980	TR1206555803; 51°15′43″N 1°02′17″E		1085504	Upload Photo	Q26372894
Thanington Court Farmhouse	II	Ashford Road			30 January 1967	TR1313456824; 51°16′14″N 1°03′15″E		1085503	Upload Photo	Q26372888
Old Manor	II	Cockering Road			14 March 1980	TR1305856110; 51°15′52″N 1°03′09″E		1336615	Upload Photo	Q26621097
Chapel of St John the Baptist, Milton	II*	Milton, Ashford Road	chapel		30 January 1967	TR1204355693; 51°15′39″N 1°02′16″E		1370012	Chapel of St John the Baptist, Milton More images	Q17557282
New House Farmhouse	II	New House Lane, New House Farm			30 January 1967	TR1316554876; 51°15′11″N 1°03′12″E		1370013	Upload Photo	Q26651276
Church of St Nicholas	II*	Thanington Road, Thanington Without Kent, CT1 3XE	church building		30 January 1967	TR1315856782; 51°16′13″N 1°03′16″E		1336614	Church of St Nicholas More images	Q17557239
Barn at Tonford Manor	II	Tonford Lane, Tonford Manor			30 January 1967	TR1240256990; 51°16′21″N 1°02′37″E		1336616	Upload Photo	Q26621098
Tonford Manor	II*	Tonford Lane, Tonford Manor	manor house		29 September 1952	TR1249357040; 51°16′22″N 1°02′42″E		1045882	Tonford Manor More images	Q17556976

== See also ==
- Grade I listed buildings in Kent
- Grade II* listed buildings in Kent

== Sources ==
- Newman, John (2013) [1969], Kent: North-East and East, The Buildings of England, New Haven and London: Yale University Press, ISBN 978-0-300-18506-5
