= Thanington =

Civil parish in Kent, England

Coordinates: 51.268610°N 1.054800°E

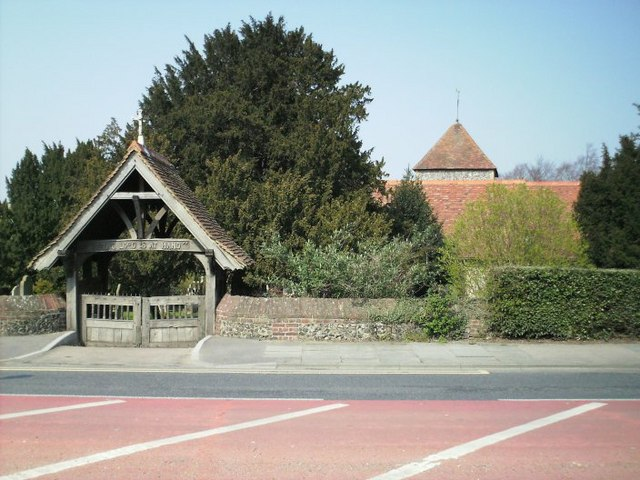
- St Nicholas' Church

- Location within Kent
- Area: 4.8 km^{2} (1.9 sq mi)
- Population: 2,662 (Civil Parish 2011)
  - Density: 555/km^{2} (1,440/sq mi)
- Civil parish: Thanington (Civil) Parish Council
- District: City of Canterbury
- Shire county: Kent
- Region: South East
- Country: England
- Sovereign state: United Kingdom
- Post town: Canterbury
- Postcode district: CT1, CT4
- Dialling code: 01227
- Police: Kent
- Fire: Kent
- Ambulance: South East Coast
- UK Parliament: Canterbury

Thanington is a civil parish on the west edge of Canterbury, Kent, United Kingdom. It extends to the south-west of A2 from Wincheap to the Milton Bridge in Chartham. In 2011 the parish had a population of 2662.

The north ward of Thanington Without follows the River Stour nearest to the city centre and London railway line, it has private housing north of Ashford Road and a large estate of mixed housing south of Ashford Road. Stuppington to the south is a linear settlement along New House Lane, New House Close and Iffin Lane. The parish church is dedicated to St Nicholas. The current civil parish was renamed from "Thanington Without" to "Thanington" on 1 April 2019.

== Transport ==
As with the rest of Canterbury, transport is neither urban super-highway nor rural back lanes in relation to the rest of Kent. An on-slip road was opened in September 2011 onto the westbound A2. Previously (since the A2 Canterbury bypass was constructed in the early 1980s), the two slip roads at Thanington were east-facing and led only to and from Dover. In 2006, the Government, the Highways Agency, Kent County Council and Canterbury City Council agreed that adding the two west-facing slip-roads would help to ease the traffic congestion in Wincheap between the Westgate and the A2. The fourth slip-road is still awaiting funding and construction.

== See also ==
- Listed buildings in Thanington Without
