= List of executed people for religious offenses =

Lists of executed people for religious offenses, including heresy, apostasy, impiety, desecration and blasphemy. This list includes people executed legally and semi-legally but not people murdered extrajudicially.

== List ==
=== Afghanistan ===
Name	Date	Crime	Method
Sahibzada Abdul Latif	14 July 1903	Apostasy	Stoning

=== Austria ===
Name	Date	Crime	Method
Franz Wunderlich	1688	Desecration	Beheading
Maria Anna Rossenberger (19)	1697	Desecration	Beheading
Anna Rosina	1702	Desecration	Beheading
Maria Francisca Rosenburgerin (19)	12 May 1705	Desecration	Beheading
Maria Catherina N. (24)	17 February 1707	Desecration	Beheading
Elisabeth Stainin (23)	16 March 1708	Desecration	Beheading
Hans Georg Fritsch (47)	June 1709	Blasphemy	Beheading
Elizabeth N. (31)	10 December 1709	Desecration	Beheading
Maria Anna Kaufeuthner (28)	1710	Desecration	Beheading
Johann Posch (19)	7 June 1712	Desecration	Beheading
Anna Catherina Köpferin (18)	12 July 1712	Desecration	Beheading
Clara Dorothea Jancovitschin (23)	30 August 1712	Desecration	Beheading
Maria Susanna Grallin (19)	27 September 1712	Desecration	Beheading
Maria Magdalena Zechirlin (20)	27 September 1712	Desecration	Beheading
Maria Elisabeth N. (20)	17 November 1712	Desecration	Beheading
Benigna Rosina Weninger (17)	23 November 1712	Desecration	Beheading
Maria Magdalena N. (18)	8 February 1713	Desecration	Beheading
Stefan Maurer (16)	9 August 1713	Desecration	Beheading
Unnamed girl (15)	31 August 1713	Desecration	Beheading
Magdalena N. (19)	20 October 1713	Desecration	Beheading
Unnamed woman (26)	2 March 1714	Desecration	Beheading
Unnamed woman (20)	24 March 1714	Desecration	Beheading
Unnamed woman (19)	8 August 1714	Desecration	Beheading
Andreas Mühlbacher (17)	27 March 1715	Desecration	Beheading
Maria Anna Wälnerin (22)	3 April 1715	Desecration	Beheading
Adam Hirschbeck (15)	18 June 1715	Desecration	Beheading
Andreas Frisch (16)	13 December 1715	Blasphemy	Beheading
Anna Margaretha N. (26)	25 October 1716	Desecration	Beheading
Anna Maria Nitzlin	November 1718	Desecration	Beheading
Unnamed woman	11 June 1720	Desecration	Beheading

- Balthasar Hubmaier (1485–1528), Vienna, Austria
- George Blaurock (1491–1529), Klausen, Tyrol
- Jakob Hutter († 1536), Innsbruck, Tyrol

=== Belgium ===
- William Tyndale (1490–1536), Belgium

=== Czech Republic ===
Name	Date	Crime	Method
Jan Olivetsky	20 September 1546	Blasphemy	Beheading

=== France ===
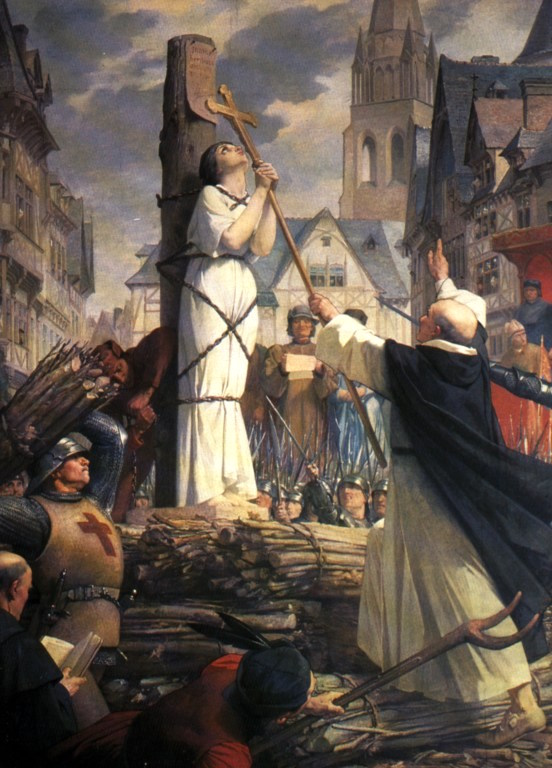
Joan of Arc at the stake, 1431

Name	Date	Crime	Method
François-Jean de la Barre	1 July 1766	Impiety and desecration	Beheading

- Orléans heresy (1022) (burnt)
- Marguerite Porete († 1310), Paris, France
- Jacques de Molay (1243–1314), burned after conviction by a tribunal under the control of King Philip IV of France, Paris, France
- Geoffroi de Charney († 1314), burned with Jacques de Molay above, Paris, France.
- Guilhèm Belibasta († 1321), last Cathar, Villerouge-Termenès, France
- Na Prous Boneta († 1328)
- Joan of Arc (1412–1431), Trial of Joan of Arc, Rouen, France
- Jean Vallière († 1523), Paris, France
- Étienne Dolet (1509–1546), Paris, France
- Lucilio Vanini (Giulio Cesare Vanini) (1585–1619), Toulouse, France

=== Germany ===
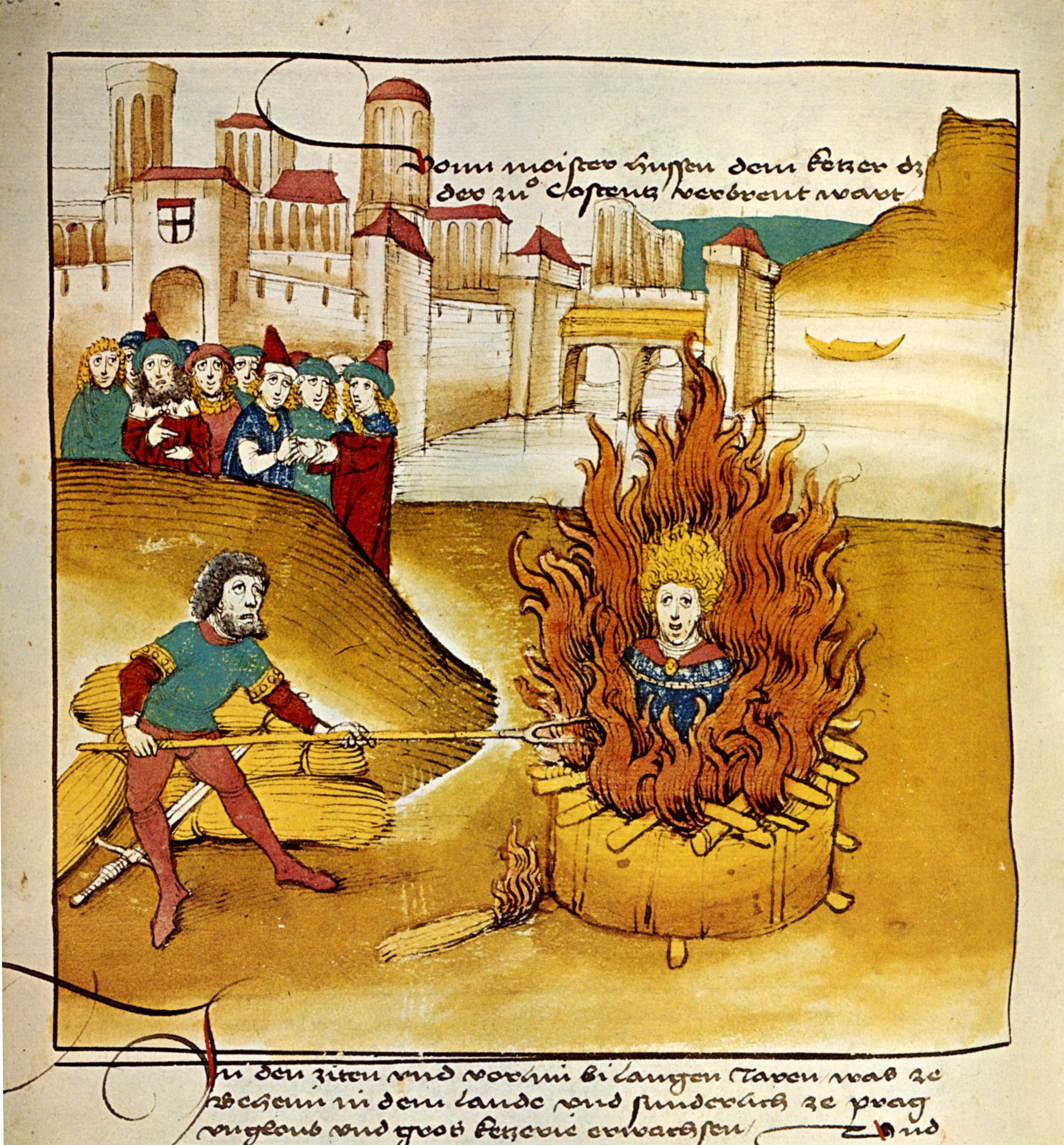
Burning of Jan Hus in Constance, 1415

- Jan Hus (1371–1415), Constance, Germany
- Jerome of Prague (1365–1416)
- Michael Sattler († 1527), Rottenburg am Neckar, Germany
- Aefgen Listincx († 1538), Münster, Germany

=== Iran ===
Name	Date	Crime	Method
Hossein Soodmand	3 December 1990	Apostasy	Hanging
Bahman Samandari	18 March 1992	Apostasy	Unknown
Ruhollah Rohani	21 July 1998	Apostasy	Unknown
Seyed Ali Gharabat	26 January 2011	Apostasy	Hanging
Mohsen Amiraslani	24 September 2014	Blasphemy	Hanging
Yousef Mehrdad	8 May 2023	Blasphemy	Hanging
Sadrollah Fazeli Zare	8 May 2023	Blasphemy	Hanging

=== Italy ===
Name	Date	Crime	Method
Antonio Rinaldeschi	1501	Desecration	
Solomon Molcho	13 December 1532	Apostasy	Burning at stake
Francesco Calcagno	23 December 1550	Blasphemy and homosexuality	
Giordano Bruno	17 February 1600	Heresy	Burning at stake

- Gerard Segarelli († 1300)
- Fra Dolcino († 1307) (never tried by Catholic Church), Italy
- Cecco d'Ascoli († 1327), Florence, Italy
- Girolamo Savonarola, Domenico da Pascia, and Silvestro Maruffi († 1498), Florence, Italy (hanged and then burned)
- Pomponio Algerio († 1556) Boiled in oil, Rome
- Pietro Carnesecchi († 1567) Florence, Italy
- Menocchio (1532–1599), Italy
- Fulgenzio Manfredi (1560 ca. - 1610) Rome, Italy
- Gertrude Cordovana († 1724), Palermo, Italy

=== Netherlands ===
Name	Date	Crime	Method
Anna Utenhoven	17 July 1597	Heresy	Burned at stake

- Jan de Bakker († 1525), 1st martyr in the Northern Netherland
- Wendelmoet Claesdochter († 1527), 1st Dutch woman charged and burned for the accusation of heresy
- Anneke Esaiasdochter († 1539), The Netherlands
- Maria van Beckum († 1544)
- Ursula van Beckum († 1544)
- Weyn Ockers († 1568), Netherlands
- Dirk Willems († 1569), Netherlands
- Anneke Ogiers († 1570), Netherlands

=== Ottoman Empire ===
Name	Date	Crime	Method	Notes
Unknown Armenian	1843	Apostasy	Beheading	Accepted Islam, but later returned to Christianity.
Unknown man	1852	Apostasy	Beheading	Converted from Islam to Christianity, executed in Aleppo.
Unknown man	1853	Apostasy	Beheading	Converted from Islam to Christianity, executed in Adrianople.
Batto Sfez Affair	1857	Blasphemy	Beheading	

=== Poland ===
Name	Date	Crime	Method
Mikołaj Grunberg	25 June 1453	Heresy	Burning at stake
Adam from Radziejów	Late September 1499	Heresy	Burning at stake
Katarzyna Weiglowa	19 April 1539	Apostasy	Burning at stake
Iwan Tyszkiewicz	1611	Blasphemy	Burning at stake
Franco de Franco	30 June 1611	Blasphemy	Quartering
Kazimierz Łyszczyński	30 March 1689	Atheism	Burning at stake

=== Portugal ===
Name	Date	Crime	Method
Ana Rodrigues (settler)	1593	Judaism	Burning at stake
Isaac de Castro Tartas	15 December 1647	Judaism	Burning at stake
Gabriel Malagrida	21 September 1671	Heresy	Strangulation
António José da Silva	18 October 1739	Judaism	Strangulation

- Kimpa Vita (1684–1706), Angola

=== Spain ===
==== Muslim Spain ====
Name	Date	Crime	Method
Perfectus	18 April 850	Blasphemy	Beheading
Sisenandus of Beja	16 July 851	Blasphemy	Beheading

==== Christian Spain ====
Name	Date	Crime	Method
Miguel de Almazán	February 1486	Judaism	Burning at stake
Hernando Alonso	17 October 1528	Judaism	Burning at stake
María de Bohórquez	1559	Heresy	Burning at stake
Francisca Nuñez de Carabajal	8 December 1569	Apostasy	Burning at stake
Luis de Carvajal the Younger	8 December 1596	Judaism	Garrote
Tomás Treviño de Sobremonte	14 April 1649	Judaism	Burning at stake
Maria Barbara Carillo	18 May 1721	Judaism	Burning at stake
Cayetano Ripoll	26 July 1826	Heresy	Hanging

- Francisco de San Roman († 1540), Spain
- Augustino de Cazalla († 1559), Valladolid, Spain
- Carlos de Seso († 1559), Valladolid, Spain
- Leonor de Cisneros († 1568), Valladolid, Spain
- Caterina Tarongí († 1691)
- Ana de Castro († 1736), Peru, Spain
- María de los Dolores López († 1781), Seville, Spain

=== Somalia ===
Name	Date	Crime	Method
Abdirahman Ahmed	15 January 2009	Apostasy	
Mohamud Mursal Muse	2015	Blasphemy	
Hassan Tohow Fidow	2021	Blasphemy	Firing squad

=== Sweden ===
Name	Date	Crime	Method
Botulf Botulfsson	April 1311	Heresy	Burned at stake
Ragvald Odenskarl	27 October 1484	Paganism	Burned at stake
Eric Clauesson	1492	Paganism	Burned at stake
82 people	7–9 November 1520	Heresy	Beheaded
Lars Nilsson	1693	Paganism	Burned at stake

=== Switzerland ===
- Michael Servetus (1511–1553), Geneva, Switzerland
- Nicolas Antoine (1602–1632), Geneva, Switzerland

=== United Kingdom ===
==== Catholic Britain ====
Burning of William Sawtre, 1401

Name	Date	Jurisdiction	Modern country	Crime	Method
Adam Duff O'Toole	11 April 1328	Kingdom of England	Ireland	Heresy	Burning at stake
Hellen Stirk	27 January 1544	Kingdom of Scotland	United Kingdom	Impiety	Drowning

- William Sawtre († 1401), Smithfield, London, England
- John Badby († 1410), Smithfield, London, England
- William Taylor († 1423), Smithfield, London, England
- Pavel Kravař († 1433)
- Joan Boughton († 1494), Smithfield, London, England
- Agnes Grebill († 1511), Kent, England
- Ipswich Martyrs († 1515–1558)
- Patrick Hamilton († 1528), St Andrews, Scotland
- Richard Bayfield († 1531), Smithfield, England
- Thomas Benet († 1531), Exeter, England
- Thomas Bilney († 1531), Norwich, England
- Joan Bocher († 1531), Smithfield, England
- Thomas Harding († 1532), Chesham, England
- James Bainham († 1532), Smithfield, England
- John Frith (1503–1533), Smithfield, England
- John Forest († 1538), Smithfield, England
- Henry Filmer († 1543), Windsor, England
- Robert Testwood († 1543), Windsor, England
- Anthony Pearson († 1543), Windsor, England
- Maria van Beckum († 1544)
- Ursula van Beckum († 1544)
- Colchester Martyrs († 1545 to 1558), 26 people, Colchester, England
- George Wishart (1513–1546), St Andrews, Scotland
- John Hooper († 1555), Gloucester, England
- John Rogers († 1555), London, England
- Canterbury Martyrs († 1555–1558), c.40 people, Canterbury, England
- Laurence Saunders, (1519–1555), Coventry, England
- Rowland Taylor († 1555), Hadleigh, Suffolk, England
- Cornelius Bongey, († 1555), Coventry, England
- Dirick Carver, († 1555), Lewes, England
- Robert Ferrar († 1555), Carmarthen, Wales
- William Flower († 1555), Westminster, England
- Patrick Pakingham († 1555), Uxbridge, England
- Hugh Latimer (1485–1555), Oxford, England
- Robert Samuel († 1555), Ipswich, England

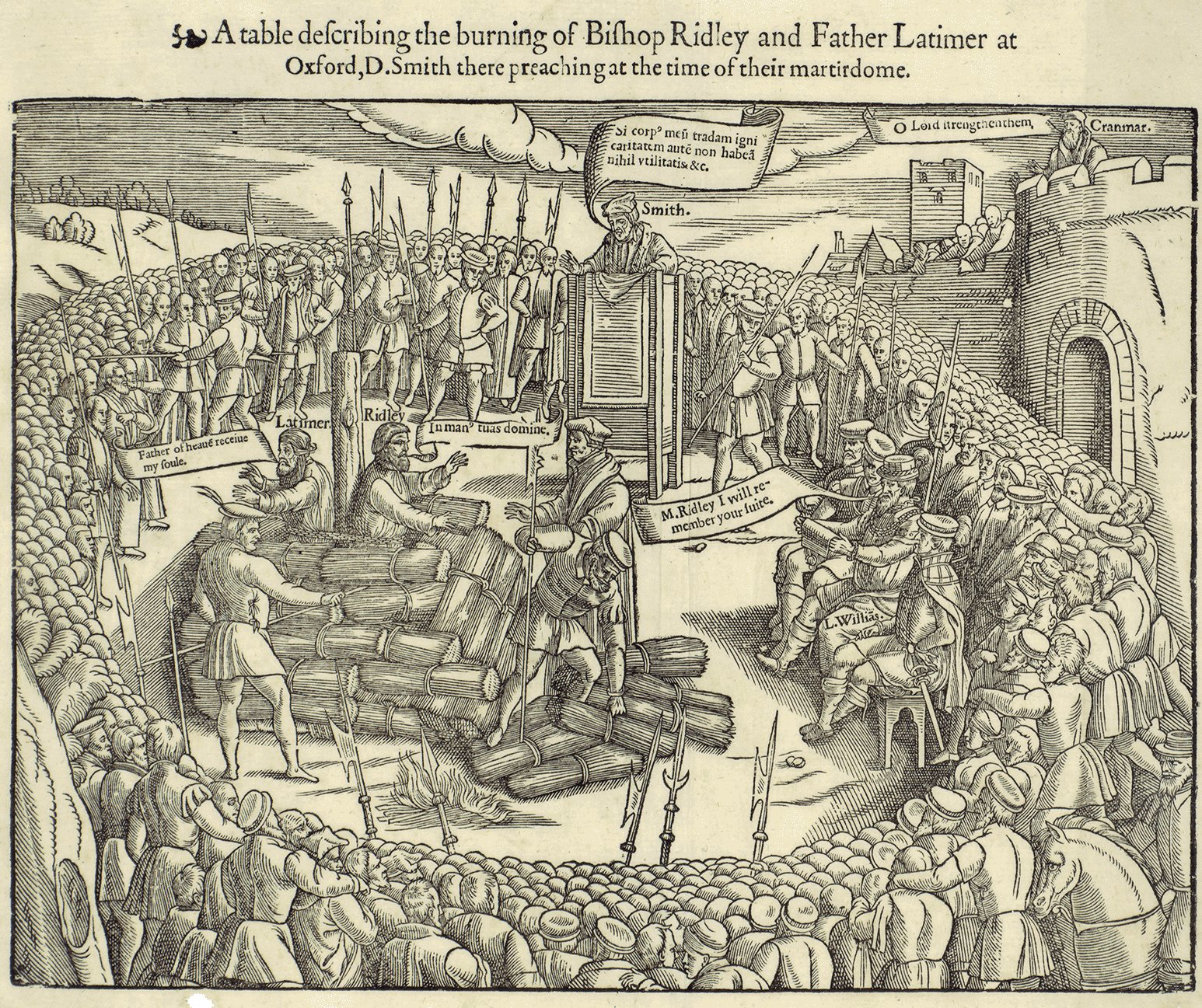
Burning of Latimer and Ridley, Oxford, 1555

- Nicholas Ridley (1500–1555), Oxford, England
- John Bradford († 1555), London, England
- John Cardmaker († 1555), Smithfield, London, England
- Robert Glover († 1555), Hertford, England
- Thomas Hawkes († 1555), Coggeshall, England
- Thomas Tomkins († 1555), Smithfield, London, England
- Thomas Cranmer (1489–1556), Oxford, England
- Stratford Martyrs († 1556), 11 men and 2 women, Stratford, London, England
- Guernsey Martyrs († 1556), 3 women, Guernsey, Channel Islands
- Joan Waste († 1556), Derby, England
- Bartlet Green († 1556), Smithfield, London, England
- John Hullier († 1556), Cambridge, England
- John Forman († 1556), East Grinstead, England
- Alexander Gooch and Alice Driver († 1558), Ipswich, England

==== Protestant Britain ====
Name	Date	Jurisdiction	Modern country	Crime	Method
Thomas Aikenhead	8 January 1697	Kingdom of Scotland	United Kingdom	Blasphemy	Burning at stake

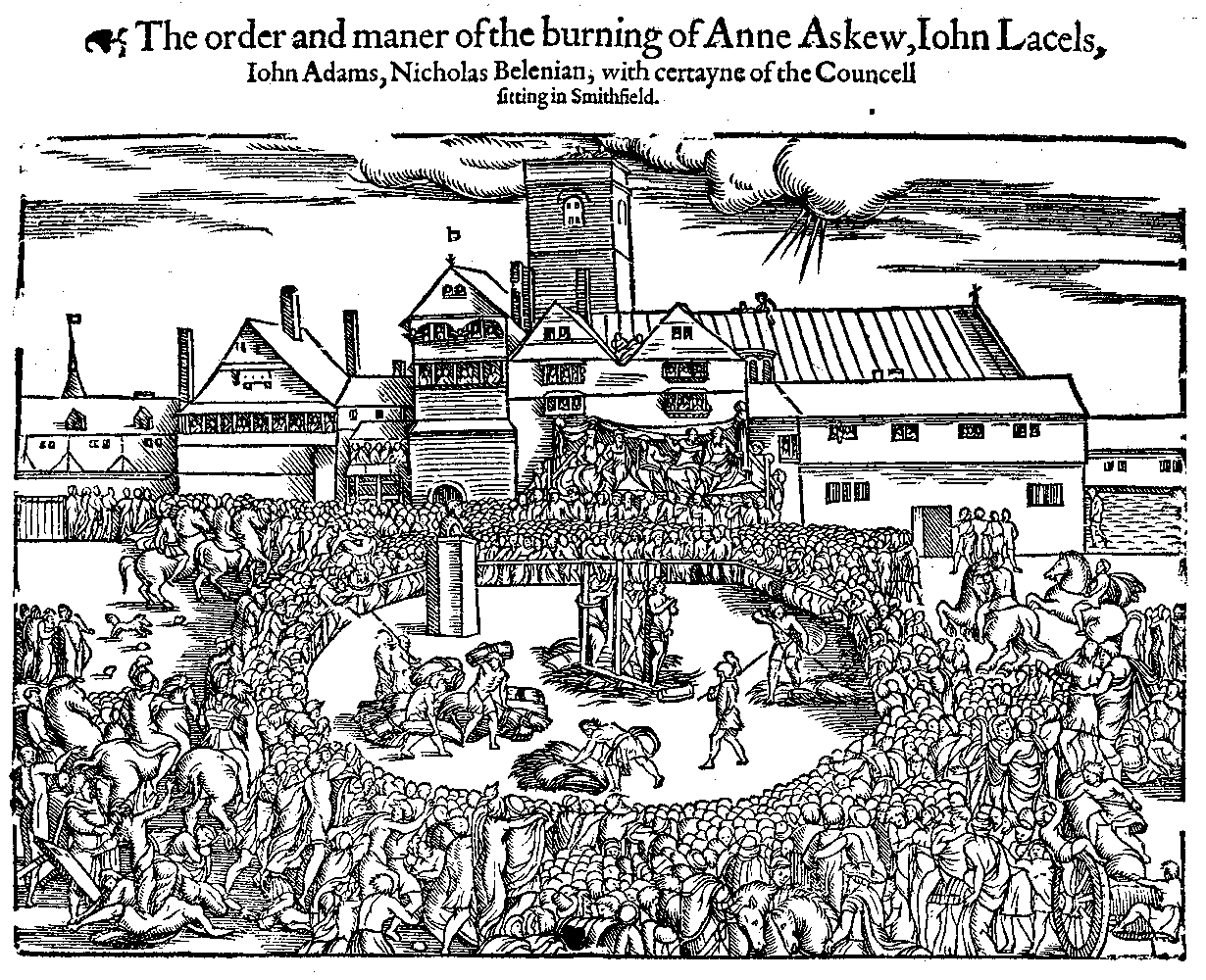
Burning of Anne Askew and John Lascelles, 1546

- Robert Barnes († 1540), Smithfield, England
- Thomas Gerrard († 1540), Smithfield, England
- Anne Askew (1521–1546), Smithfield, England
- John Lascelles († 1546), Smithfield, England
- John Adams († 1546), Smithfield, England
- Joan Bocher († 1550), Smithfield, England
- George van Parris († 1551), Smithfield, England
- Stephen Cotton († 1558), Brentford, England
- Matthew Hamont († 1579), Norwich, England
- Francis Kett († 1589), Norwich, England
- Bartholomew Legate (1575–1612), Smithfield, England
- Edward Wightman (1566–1612), relapsed heretic, Lichfield, England

=== Eastern Orthodox countries ===
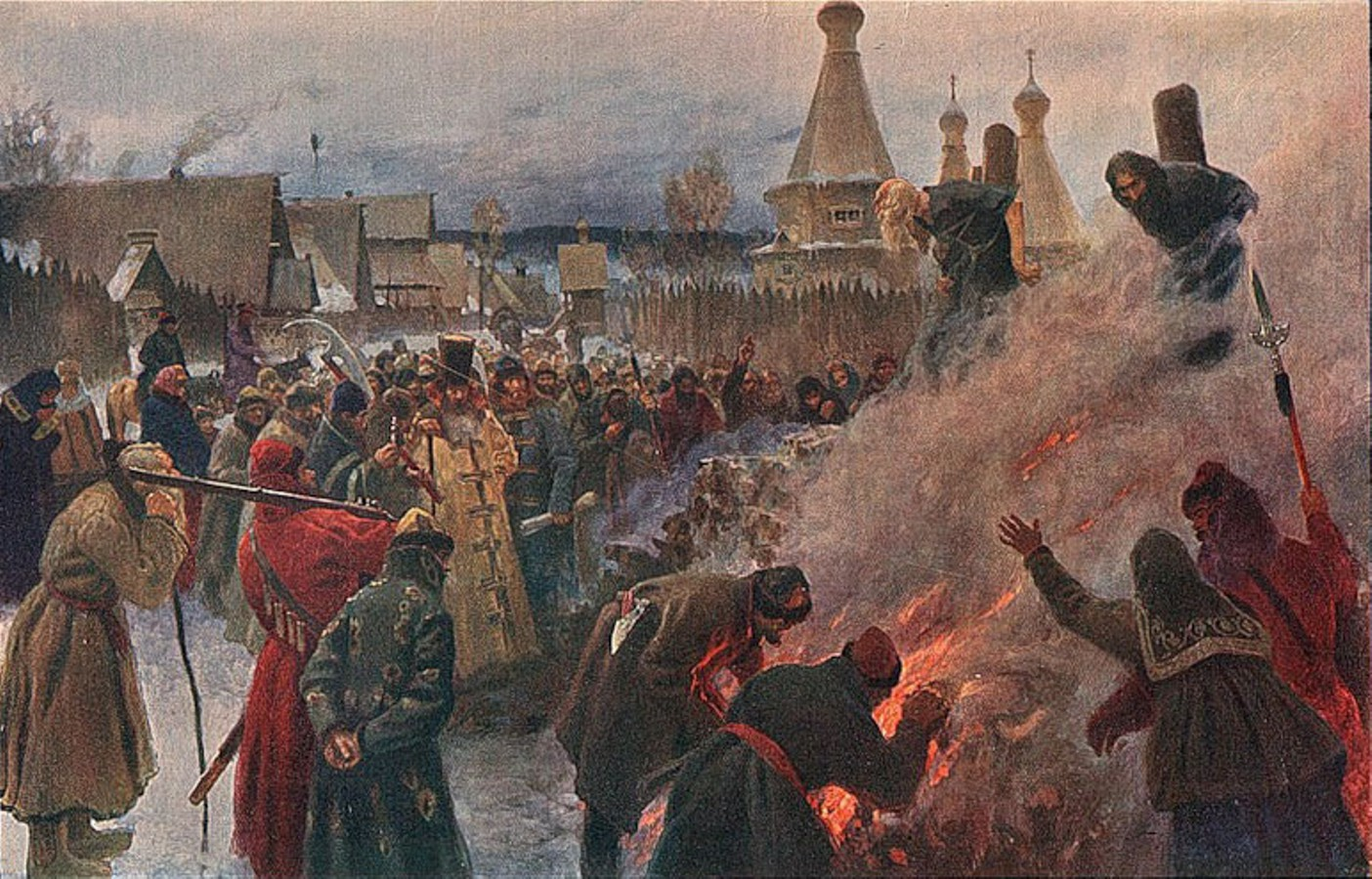
The "baptism by fire" of Old Believer leader Avvakum in 1682

- Basil the Physician († 1118), by Emperor Alexius I Comnenus; heresy
- Avvakum Petrovich (1620–1682), by Tsar Feodor III of Russia; combating the Starovery movement
- Quirinus Kuhlmann († 1689), by Tsar Ivan V of Russia; considered politically dangerous

=== Other countries ===
Name	Date	Jurisdiction	Modern country	Crime	Method
Socrates	399 BC	Classical Athens	Greece	Impiety	Poison
al-Hallaj	26 March 922	Abbasid Caliphate	Iraq	Heresy	Beheading
Thomas of Tolentino	8 April 1321	Delhi Sultanate	India	Blasphemy	Beheading
Marina of Omura	11 November 1634	Japan	Japan	Sheltering priests	Burning at stake
Mahmoud Mohammed Taha	18 January 1985	Sudan	Sudan	Apostasy and blasphemy	Beheading
Sadeq Mallallah	3 September 1992	Saudi Arabia	Saudi Arabia	Apostasy and blasphemy	Beheading

== Sublists ==
- List of Protestant martyrs of the English Reformation
- List of Protestant martyrs of the Scottish Reformation
- List of Catholic martyrs of the English Reformation

== See also ==
- Blasphemy laws
