= Antonio Herrezuelo =

Spanish lawyer

Antonio Herrezuelo (1513, Toro, Castile (in modern Spain) – May 21, 1559, Valladolid), also called Antonio de Herrezuela, or Anton Herrezuelo, was a lawyer in Toro. He is considered a Protestant martyr.

== Life ==
Around 1551, the Italian Carlos de Seso, son of the Bishop of Piacenza (Catalan Trivulzio), founded a Protestant conventicle in Valladolid, the former seat of the Spanish court. He had converted to Lutheranism the previous year, probably under the influence of the works of Juan de Valdés, and brought reformist texts into Spain. De Seso's proselytising began in Logroño and continued in Toro where he married Isabella de Castilla, who had royal ancestry.

In 1554, helped by his wife's social status, de Seso was elected corregidor (mayor) of Toro. Among his early converts to the Protestant faith were Herrezuelo and his wife Leonor de Cisneros - they had married in 1553 - and other notables. In Pedrosa, a town between Valladolid and Toro, de Seso converted the pastor Pedro de Cazalla for the Reformation.

== Discovery and arrest of the community ==
Although the Lutheran community of Valladolid had grown to about 70 members within a few years it had managed to remain undetected by the authorities.

About Easter of 1558, publication of the Edict of Faith led to two denunciations. Christóbal de Padilla, a janitor of the Marquess of Alcañizes in Zamora, having spoken carelessly, was arrested and thrown into prison by Antonio del Aguila Vela y Paz, Bishop of Zamora (1546-1560). About this time two more conventicle members, Francisco and Beatriz de Vivero, had been informed on by Juana de Fonseca and Antonia de Branches. De Padilla had managed to send a message to Herrezuelo, who in turn had warned Pedro de Cazalla and the alarm spread. Some awaited arrest, some turned themselves in and denounced others. Of the three who attempted to escape, Fray Dominigo de Rojas, Carlos de Seso and Juan Sánchez, only the last did escape to Flanders, but was captured a year later and he too suffered the fate of his Lutheran fellows.

On January 4, 1559 Pope Paul IV granted a Spanish request by the Grand Inquisitor, Valdés, and the Council of the Supreme General Inquisition, to confirm a heresy conviction where an abjuration was offered, if the probable intent was to evade punishment.

On Maundy Thursday, March 23, 1559, during a service the house was raided and most of the congregation was arrested. Among those arrested were Antonio Herrezuelo and Leonor de Cisneros. Held in separate cells in the secret prison of the Inquisition in Valladolid. According to the interrogation methods of torture, each prisoner was informed that all the other prisoners had recanted. Herrezuelo refused to divulge the names of other members of the group, or to recant, or to cease proselytising in Toro.

== Methods of inquisition ==
The Auto-da-fé ("Act of Faith") was the ceremonial religio-legal process adopted by the Inquisition, in a Church-State alliance, whose initial target was mainly prominent Jews, Moriscos and the wealthy elites. A guilty verdict meant the confiscation of property, lands and assets. Soon other groups came within its scope, until hundreds, finally thousands, were deprived of their property and freedom, while many lost their lives.

Terrified prisoners were pressured into betraying fellows, friends, family member with threats and assurances. On the day of the public auto-da-fé, a prisoner was taken from her cell only then to discover the fate of her fellows. Typically an accused was ignorant of the denouncer(s), and of specific nature of any allegations against them. She was told merely that the evidence of heresy was sufficient to convict, and the choice was to revoke or death.

When the tribune envoys visited Augustino Cazalla on the eve of his execution they found him in a dark cell, loaded with chains, wearing a pié de amigo although he had freely confessed, recanted, and begged for mercy. Auto-da-fé were held on Sundays, usually in the central public square, attended by church and state dignitaries. 40-day indulgences were offered in inducement of a large public attendance.

On the eve of the execution the condemned prisoner learned their fate, and received a last inducement to recant by the offer of the “grace” of garrotting (strangulation) prior to being burned at the stake. On the morning itself, the condemned was led from the dark cell to the fire. The unrepentant heretic wore the penitential cloak called a "sanbenito" - a loose sleeveless yellow woollen cloth, knee-length and open at the neck, similar to a scapular- on his head was a high peaked cap called a “tiare” and walked with hands bound in front and bearing a flaming torch of green wax. On the sanbenito was the image of a man engulfed by flames and devils. For the reconciled heretic to be previously strangled, the tips of the flames displayed on the robe pointed downwards. Those who had been reprieved bore a reddish St. Andrew's cross on sanbenito and Tiare or, in the case of lesser offences, a part of the cross. Only the torches of the condemned were lit.

== Inquisition trial ==
The first autodafé in Valladolid was held on Trinity Sunday May 21, 1559. The condemned Lutherans of the conventicle were brought before the court of the Inquisition in the large public marketplace of Valladolid. Tribunes were built in a semicircle. On one stand sat the Inquisitor General and Archbishop of Seville, Fernando Valdés (held office 1546-1566), with the entire Inquisitorial College, four other bishops and the colleges of civil servants. 200,000 spectators crowded the square, the streets, the windows and the rooftops. Ministers, representatives of the secular authorities and many influential figures were in attendance. Along the route the condemned walked each house had a stage. People came from distances of 60–70 km and camped. A few persons were permitted to ride, or carry weapons. Before the palace on a special stage in the royal box, was the regent Infanta Juana, the sister of King Philip II, her nephew, the crown prince of Asturias, the 13-year-old Infante Don Carlos, the Archbishop of Santiago de Compostela, Gaspar Zúñiga Avellaneda (term 1558-1569), the whole court and many nobles, attended the pre-dawn ceremony. The events were also immortalized in copper engravings and other works of art. (See pictures.)

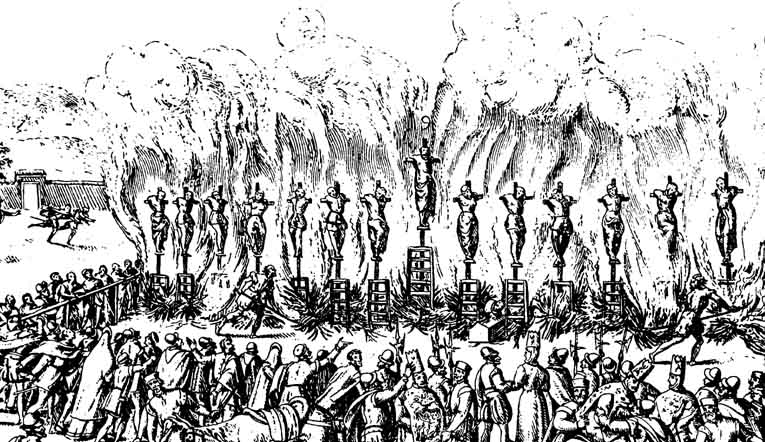
Cremation of the convicted on 21st May 1559 in Valladolid

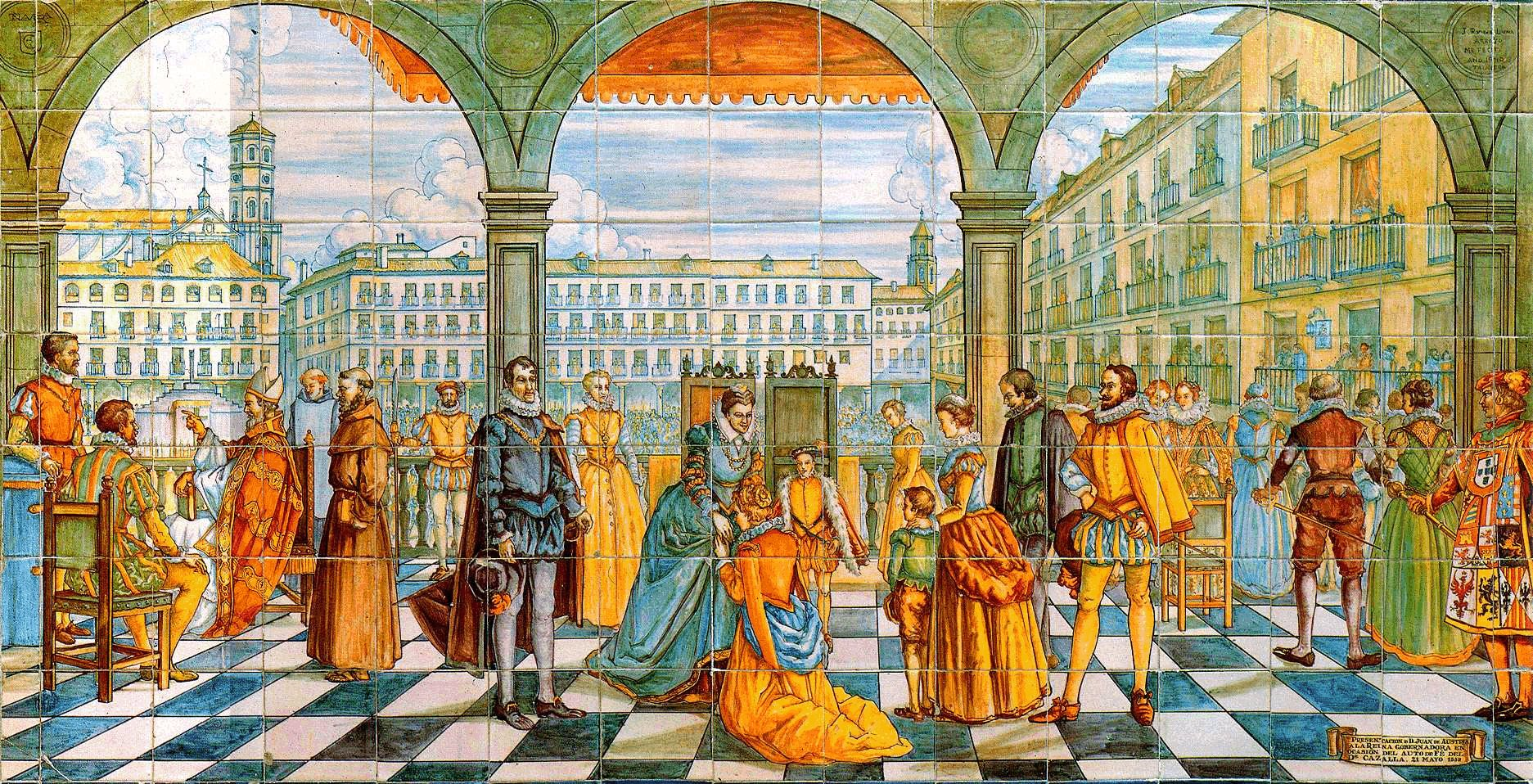
Presentation of Juan de Austria on the occasion of the Autodafé

From the Inquisition building next to the square, gunmen opened a passage through the crowd, followed by the prisoners guarded by officers of the Inquisition. The width of the processional path was staked, so that the prisoners could walk side by side in threes. Almost all bore signs of evident torture. In the foreground a cross wrapped in black cloth was carried, with the red flag of the Inquisition, bearing the names of the Pope and the King; these items were finally stowed on their own scaffolding. Leading the prisoners were the five siblings, including two clergymen and a nun. (For details see chapter Some other condemned.) The highest place on the stage received Dr Augustino de Cazalla, preacher and leader of the evangelical community of Valladolid and former chaplain to Charles V, then came his brother Francisco de Cazalla. Next to him was an effigy of a woman standing on a wooden box, dressed like the prisoners. The effigy represented Leonor de Vivero, the mother of the five siblings who had died in the prison. The box contained her remains. Her corpse was to be burnt together with her children. The inquisitors sat under a canopy, opposite was an altar, on which stood a crucifix, candlesticks and the other altars for the sacrifice of the mass. Next to it was a pulpit from which Melchior Cano, a well-known, learned Dominican and Bishop of the Canaries, gave the one-hour sermon for the autodafé.

After the ceremony, the Inquisitor of Valladolid, Francisco Baca, went to the tribune of the Infante and Infanta, and asked both to take an oath to protect the Inquisition and denounce any opponent of the Roman Catholic faith. (A translation of the oath formula is available in the State Lexicon indicated under sources.) Under this regulatory procedure of the Spanish Inquisition, which the royal couple Ferdinand and Isabella had introduced, the performing magistrate of the autodafé, would demand a corresponding oath. The formality would have occurred at the inauguration of the Inquisition in Valladolid and it is unlikely members of the ruling family actually swore the oath. Carlos and Juana responded to the request and took the oath on the cross in the Missal of the Archbishop of Seville, and received a blessing. The audience chanted this oath, that the Inquisition protect and promote: "To the death!" Other participants also swore the oath. Baca's approach was held an affront to the Crown and Don Carlos' attitude to the Inquisition remained negative for life. He died in 1568 shortly before the planned high treason trial.

== Verdicts ==
After Agustín de Cazalla, Francisco de Vibero Cazalla and Alonso Pérez were degraded, the verdicts of the Inquisition and the Secular Court were announced. All were convicted and their assets to be confiscated. However, Antonio Herrezuelo alone refused to recant and was the only one of the eighteen convicts to be burned alive a Protestant martyr on this occasion. The others repented, begged for mercy, and testified against their friends and siblings. Only two or three defendants were accused of the capital offence of proselytising Lutheranism.

The papal bull of January 4, 1559 (see above) was followed: the 50 defendants, including Leonor de Cisneros, publicly recanted their Protestant faith received heavy penalties and returned to Roman Catholicism but 13 of these, including a Portuguese Jew were relaxed to the secular arm to be pardoned with strangulation before burning. Antonio Herrezuelo alone was burned alive.

== Executions ==
At the execution site in front of the Puerta del Campo, the condemned to death were accompanied by many armed men, riding donkeys, facing backwards. It was on the way, that Herrezuelo passing his wife and seeing her sanbenito, had learned she had recanted. His furious words to her (after Höck's translation) were: "Is that the value of six years of teaching?" She gave no reply. However she later returned to the Protestant faith as a "recidivist" and suffered her husband's fate, being burned at the stake on 26 September 1568. Leonor de Cisneros, too was recognised as a Protestant martyr.

To prevent him evangelizing on the way to the cremation, Herrezuelo was gagged with a spiky iron bit. Agustín de Cazalla, implored him to renounce. An eyewitness account of Herrezuelos’ obdurate behaviour was given by the abbot, Gonzalo de Illescasago. Herrezuelo was chained to a pile in the middle of 14 equally spaced pyres where the other condemned were strangled by chains. A stone was thrown at Herrezuelo 's forehead and blood ran down his face. Llorente reports also, that an execution guard was so enraged at Herrezuelo's obdurance, he stabbed him with his lance. Herrezuelo, it was said, showed no emotion, even as the wood was lit, until consumed in the fire to death. Illescas later reported that Herrezuelo remained as still as a flintstone without a lament or regret uttered, though he is said to have had a strangely sad expression at the moment of death.

== Memorial day ==
September 26 is a remembrance day in the Protestant calendar.

== Some more convicts ==
The following were also sentenced on 21 May 1559 in Valladolid:

=== Death by garrotting (strangulation) ===
- Dr. Agustín de Cazalla (priest, canon of Salamanca, almoner and court preacher of Emperor Charles V)
- Francisco de Vibero Cazalla (brother of Agustín de Cazalla, priest, priest in Hormigos in the diocese of Palencia. At the auto he was gagged for blasphemy, but begged for mercy and suffered his brother's fate.)
- Beatrice de Vibero Cazalla (sister of Agustín and Francis de Cazalla, nun)
- Eleonore de Vibero (dam of siblings Cazalla, already deceased, represented at the process by her statue)
- Dr. Alonso Pérez (priest in Palencia, PhD in theology)
- Christóbal de Ocampo (from Seville, Knights of St. John, almsman Anton de Toledos, the Grand Prior of Castile and Leon)
- Christóbal de Padilla (Knight, resident of Zamora, janitor of the Marquesa of Alcañizes)
- Juan Garcia (gold worker in Valladolid)
- Perez de Herrera (Licentiate, Judge of the Stalker in Logroño, brother of the royal court sire D. Vincent)
- Gonzalez Baez (a Jew from Portugal)
- Catherine de Ortega (widow of Commander García Jofre de Loaísa, daughter of the Fiscal of the Royal Council of Castile, resident of Valladolid)
- Catherine Roman de Pedrosa
- Isabella d'Estrada
- Jane Blazquiez (servants of the Marquesa of Alcañizes)

=== Life imprisonment and wearing the sanbenito ===
- Pedro Sarmiento de Roxas (from Valencia, Knight of the Santiagoorden, Commander of Quintana, son of John de Roxas, the first Marquis of Poza)
- Mencia de Figueroa (wife of Pedro Sarmiento de Roxas, Queen of the Queen)
- Juan de Vibero Cazalla (brother Agustín de Cazallas, born in Valladolid)
- Juana Silva de Ribera (wife Juan de Vibero Cazallas, born in Valladolid, daughter of Johann de Ribera, the Marquis of Montemayor and his slave Marie Florin)
- Constance de Vibero Cazalla (Sister Agustín de Cazallas, widow of the notary Hernand Ortiz, mother of 13 children)
- Juan de Ulloa Pereira (knight and commentator of the Order of Saint John, inhabitant of Toro, son and brother of Barone de la Mota, general in Germany under Charles V.)
- Leonor de Cisneros
- Franziska Zuñiga de Baeza (daughter Alfons da Baezas and Marie Zuñigas)
- Marina da Saavedra (born in Zamora, widow of Johann Cisneros de Sotos)
- Isabella Minguez (Servant of Beatrice Vibero Cazalla)
- Daniel de la Quadra (from Pedrosa)

=== Milder penalties ===
Three-year prison sentence with sanbenito:

- Antonio Minguez (brother of Isabella Minguez, inhabitant of Pedrosa)

Incarceration in a monastery:

- Anne Henriquez de Roxas (daughter Alfons Henriquez d'Almansas and Elvire de Roxas, granddaughter of the first Marquis of Poza, wife of a Baron of St. Euphemia, 24 years old)

One-year imprisonment in a monastery and Roman Catholic religious education:

- Anthony Wasor (from England, servant of Louis de Roxas)

Confinement in her monastery, withdrawal of the vote and degradation to the lowest monastic grade:

- Maria de Roxas (nun in St Catherine's Monastery in Valladolid, 40 years old, sister of Elvire de Roxas, Marquess of Alcanizes, daughter of the first Marques of Poza)

Prohibition to inherit the Marquis title or to leave the country, as well as banishment from Madrid, Valladolid and Valencia:

- Louis de Roxas (nephew Pedro Sarmiento de Roxas, eldest son of Sanchez de Roxas Sarmiento and Franziske Henriquez d'Almansa, grandson and heir to the Marquis of Poza)

== Reception ==
M. v. Féréal described the trial of Antonio Herrezuelo in the historical novel The Secrets of the Inquisition and Other Secret Societies of Spain. In 1852, a translation by Dr. med. L. Meyer in the literary sheet The Torch (Volumes 6-7) by Samuel Gottlieb Ludvigh, which is available as a free e-book at [1]. A reprint was published in April 2000 in Reprint-Verlag Leipzig with ISBN 3-8262-0602-9 and ISBN 978-3-8262-0602-3, an excerpt can be found at [2].

Simon Vestdijk processed the fate of Antonio Herrezuelo and Leonor de Cisnere in his novel about El Greco, see [3].
