= Sponka.tv =

Sponka.tv is a Slovenian regional television station most notable for the Frequency Controversy it was involved in from 2003 to 2010. It broadcasts in the regions of Koper, Sežana and Nova Gorica.

Sponka.tv was born as a Cable TV channel, and has only been broadcasting on terrestrial TV since 2003.

== Programmes ==
The station broadcasts mostly local news, local sports, and music, as well as advertisement and pornographic films at late night. It claims to be the voice of the culture and the people of the Slovenian Littoral.

=== Programme Controversy ===
The programming is not without controversy. For example, the pornographic films are broadcast too early, starting at 22:00, even though Slovenian law prohibits their broadcast at that kind of time. In addition, the music broadcast by the station is mostly Balkan (Serbian turbofolk) which has nothing to do with the Slovenian Littoral.

== Frequency Controversy ==
The station is controversial, because it transmits, from the local repeater of Tinjan, near the town of Koper, on the Slovenian Littoral, on the channel UHF 52. However, in the same area, on the same channel, transmits, from the repeater of Conconello in Trieste (but also receivable on the same frequency from the repeaters of Monte Madonna (Teolo) in Padua, Prati della Chiesa (Pedrosa) Udine, and Monte San Michele (Sagrado) in Gorizia), the Italian private channel Italia Uno, which is the most watched channel by the youths of both Italy, and the Slovenian Littoral.

=== Beginning ===
The controversy began in late 2003 when Sponka.TV got the license to broadcast on UHF 52 from Tinjan. According to known sources, this was done because the European Commission told Slovenia to turn on anything at all on that channel in order to reclaim it. The wills of the people in the transmitter's target area were not considered at all. At the first the channel's signal was relatively week but its strength kept increasing. The first complaints also appeared in social media around then.

In addition, the station's director, Neda Gerželj, engaged in defamatory practices against the Italian Republic on the same social media. Already then, however, the raison d'etre of the station's terrestrial frequency was called into question by the local population because according to contemporary Slovenian law, a cable-only station was not allowed to start terrestrial transmissions, putting into question the validity of the station's license.

=== Frequency war ===
In addition, Italia Uno was then the most watched channel in the Slovenian littoral and might therefore have been deemed unwanted competition. Other big commercial Italian channels were also targets of the so-called Frequency war, for example most frequencies of Canale 5, Italia Uno's sister channel, were covered too, as were those of the second sister channel, Rete 4. La7 (formerly Telemontecarlo) and MTV Italia (formerly Videomusic) were also subject to interferences, however so were also the Slovenian POP TV and Kanal A, subject to interferences from the Italian side (though the Italians were the first to broadcast on those frequencies).

There was also a mysterious fire at the Conconello transmitter around the same time, which damaged the transmission equipment of Telefriuli, causing it to reduce the strength of its signal, limiting its availability on Slovenian territory. The causes for that fire have to this day not been established, and the possibility it was a Slovenian terrorist attack against the transmitter exists.

=== Temporary stop ===
In around 2005, the situation came to a temporary stop, as the signal of Sponka.TV on UHF 52 disappeared, leaving Italia Uno visible with a clear picture again. The complaints subsided and the situation returned to normal. Sponka.TV resumed its broadcasts on Cable TV.

The reasons for that are to this day unknown, and most people at the time thought the channel simply gave up and desisted. However, that would soon prove false.

=== Resumption ===
The crisis resumed when Sponka.TV's signal returned and Italia Uno disappeared again. Complaints from the local population flared up again but were again ignored. Eventually, the signal's strength was increased again. Soon, the channel also turned on a second frequency, UHF 30 from Ankaran-Hrvatini, making it impossible to receive La7 (formerly Telemontecarlo) in some places. And, just like UHF 52, the signal on UHF 30 also interfered on Italian territory.

In addition, the channel's broadcasts were also detected on UHF 34 in Divača, possibly from Sežana, without any license, whatsoever, and it eventually also obtained frequencies on a transmitter north of Nova Gorica, again without license.

=== Apparent end ===
Since December 2010, the controversy has become moot as Italy and Slovenia have both switched off the analog signals, and the digital multiplex inside which Italia Uno is located is on channel UHF 49 (between 2010 and 2012 on UHF 36), and was never on Sponka.TV's UHF 34.

However, for a while, UHF 52 and UHF 30 both kept transmitting in analog even after the switch off for unknown reasons, interfering with a Mediaset pay TV multiplex on UHF 52 and a RAI state TV multiplex on UHF 30. Also, Sponka.TV started an expansion without license, as it became hosted in ViTel TV's multiplex in Nova Gorica, on UHF 34 (same frequency Sponka.TV's own multiplex broadcasts on from Ankaran-Hrvatini).

This and the station's previous actions make it possible that it was all along interested in nothing but aggressive expansionism in the aether.

In December 2011 Sponka.tv has also begun transmitting via DTT on channel UHF 34 (Multiplex L5) from the transmitter of Ankaran.

=== Reasons for the controversy ===
Due to Sponka.tv's signal interfering with that of Italia Uno, at some locations to the point of Sponka.tv completely replacing Italia Uno, several requests have been forwarded to the direction of Sponka.tv, requesting them to cease, and desist, their transmissions from Tinjan, or at least, to move them onto some other frequency. Sponka.tv's direction, however, dis-missed the requests completely.

The controversy is important, because Sponka.tv doesn't interfere with Italia Uno only on the Slovenian territory, but also on the Italian territory, hence, why the owners of Italia Uno, Silvio Berlusconi's Mediaset, themselves, also requested Sponka.tv to do something about the issue already, yet, Sponka.tv still refuses to comply with the given requests, giving the 1961 agreement between Italy, and Yugoslavia, in which, the channel UHF 52 was assigned to Yugoslavia, as their reason not to do so. However, Yugoslavia, and later, Slovenian, never used the channel until the advent of Sponka.tv in 2003, hence, why Mediaset used the channel for Italia Uno. The channel has also been assigned to Italy for after 2012, for use in DTT broadcasting.

Another reason for the controversy is that the program is from Portorož, yet its intended area of terrestrial coverage only includes the town of Koper and its surroundings, while Portorož is not even considered.
