= Joan Butcher =

Joan Butcher may refer to:

- Joan Bocher (died 1550), also known as Joan Butcher, English Anabaptist
- Joan Garwood, also known as Joan Butcher, fictional character on BBC TV soap opera EastEnders
