= William Burton (priest) =

English Anglican priest and writer

William Burton (died 1616) was an English clergyman, known for his writings, an insider's view of the Puritan ascendancy at Norwich, and as an eyewitness to heresy executions.

== Life ==
He was born at Winchester (year unknown, but thought to have lived to past 70). He was educated at Winchester School and New College, Oxford, of which, after graduating B.A., he was admitted perpetual fellow on 5 April 1563. He left the university in 1565.

He was minister at Norwich for five years, taken to be the period 1584–9. But he seems to have been in Norwich or the immediate neighbourhood at least as early as 1576, perhaps as assistant in the free school. His name appears in 1583 among the Norfolk divines (over sixty in number) who scrupled subscription to John Whitgift's three articles. He left an account of Norwich during his time. The leaders of the Puritans were John More, vicar of St. Andrew's (died 1592), and Thomas Roberts, rector of St. Clements (died 1576). For many years there was daily preaching, attended by the magistrates and over twenty of the city clergy, besides those of the cathedral. It was the custom each day for one or other of the magistrates to keep open house for the clergy, whose advice was sought in the city council.

He saw the burning at Norwich, on 14 January 1589, of Francis Ket as an Arian. Burton testified to the apparent godliness of Ket's life and conversation, but is certain of his damnation. He also reports on the executions of Matthew Hamont (died 1579), John Lewes (died 1583) and Peter Cole (died 1587), all likewise burned. Burton took a Puritan line in rejecting ceremonies, but was firm against the Brownist separatists.

He left Norwich after troubles which befell him about some matters of his ministry. In later years it was reported that the civic authorities had driven him away; his enemies wrote to Norwich for copies of records which they expected would tell against him; but it seems that the mayor and council had done their best to retain him. On leaving Norwich he found a friend in Henry Wentworth, 3rd Baron Wentworth, who took him into his house, gave him books, and was the means of his resuming work as minister. Richard Fletcher, Bishop of Bristol, gave him some appointment in Bristol. Complaints were made about his teaching, and he published his ‘Catechism,’ 1591, which is a workmanlike presentation of Calvinism. In it he argues against bowing at the name of Jesus, and describes the right way of solemnising Christmas. He became vicar of St. Giles, Reading, on 25 November 1591. At some unknown date (after 1608) he came to London. He died intestate in the parish of St Sepulchre-without-Newgate. His wife, Dorothy, survived him; his son Daniel administered to his effects on 17 May 1616.

== Works ==
He calls his ‘Catechism,’ 1591, his ‘first fruites.’ Of Burton's publications, the earliest written was a single sermon preached at Norwich on 21 December 1589 from Jer. iii. 14, but it was probably not published till later. He subsequently published several sets of sermons which had been delivered in Bristol. Anthony Wood enumerates eight subsequent collections of sermons and seven treatises, including ‘An Abstract of the Doctrine of the Sabbath,’ 1606. The little volume of sermons entitled ‘Dauids Evidence’ was reprinted in 1596, and in 1602.

Burton translated seven dialogues of Erasmus, published to prove ‘how little cause the papists haue to boast of Erasmus, as a man of their side.’ This was issued in 1606.
