= Agustín de Cazalla =

Spanish clergyman, with humanist and Erasmist tendencies

- Born: 1510
- Died: 21 May 1559 (aged 48–49); Valladolid
- Cause of death: Executed by garrotting, then burnt at the stake
- Era: Reformation
- Known for: Lutheran martyr
- Parent(s): Pedro de Cazalla and Leonor de Vibero

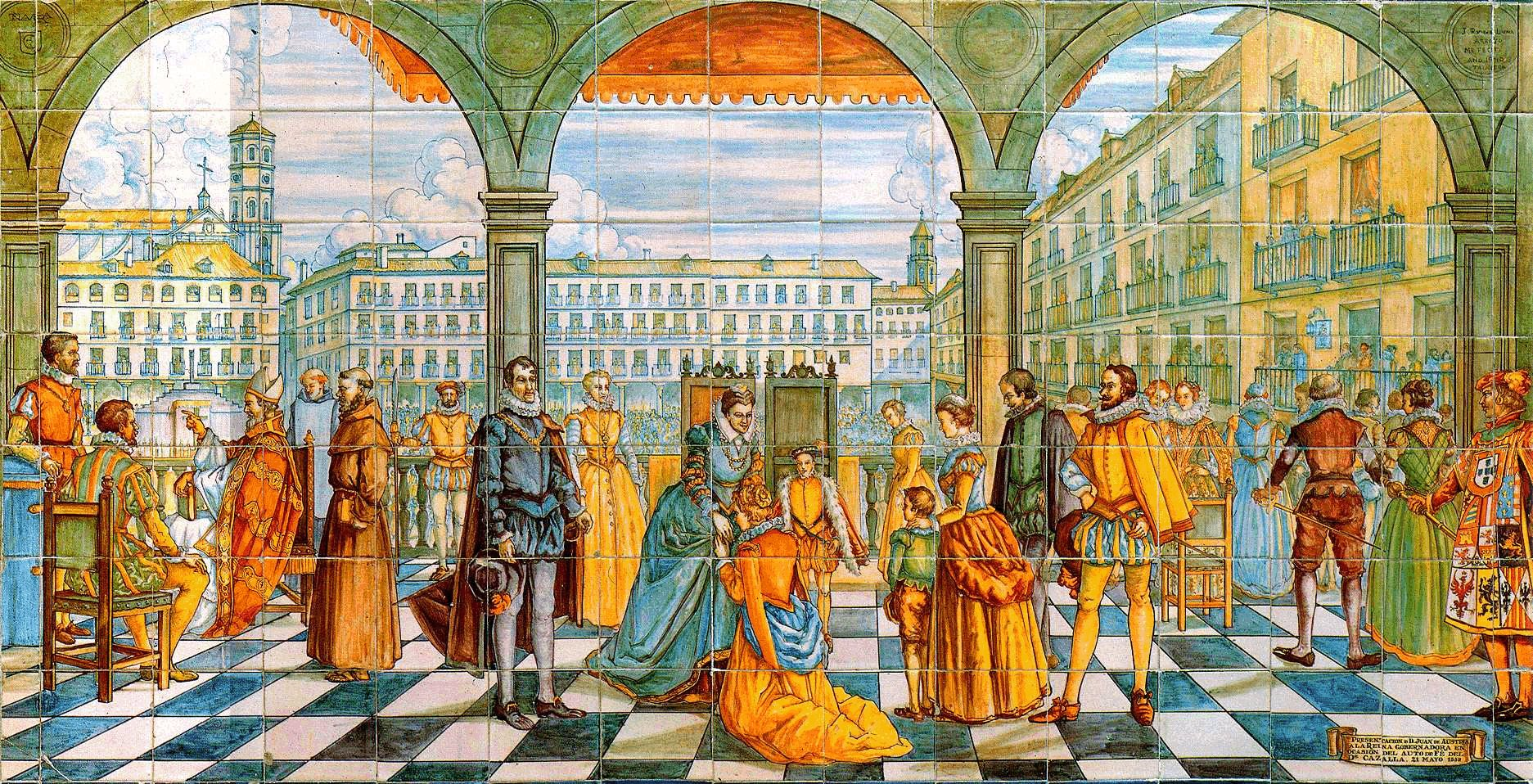
Auto-da-fé of Doctor Cazalla, in Valladolid.

Agustín de Cazalla (1510-1559) was a Spanish clergyman, with humanist and Erasmist tendencies, who was prosecuted for founding a Protestant sect in Valladolid. The son of a royal accountant, Pedro de Cazalla, and Leonor de Vibero (or Vivero) - both were of 'converso' families - the nephew of Bishop Juan de Cazalla and the brother of María de Cazalla (of the group of illuminati in Guadalajara in 1525), he studied at the University of Valladolid with Bartolomé Carranza (who was also tried by the Spanish Inquisition) and at the University of Alcalá de Henares, where his uncle Juan was the former chaplain to Cardinal Cisneros and was also a renowned humanist and Erasmist. His classmate in Alcalá, Diego Laínez, was a founding member of the Society of Jesus.

Agustín was a canon in the cathedral of Salamanca and became chaplain to the Emperor Charles V, accompanying him throughout Europe. On his return to Valladolid in 1552, he joined a conventicle considered heretical. Among this group of religious elites was the corregidor of Toro, Carlos de Seso with whom he had been in contact Juan de Valdés in Italy. Despite the strict rules and secrecy practiced within the circle they were discovered.

== Trial and conviction ==
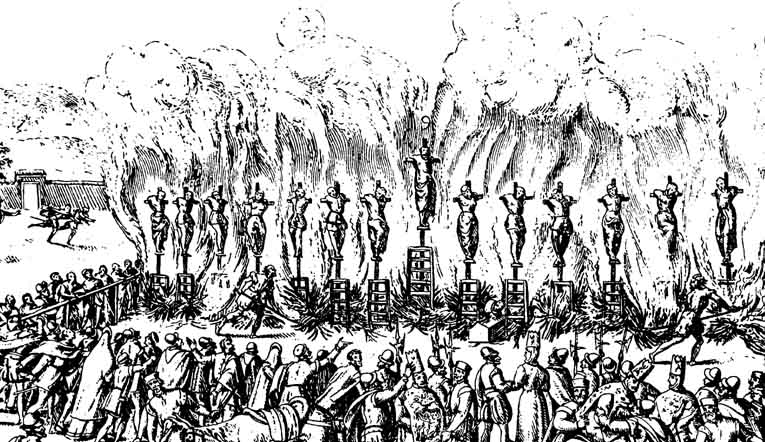
Contemporary illustration of the auto-da-fé of Valladolid, in which fourteen Protestants were burned at the stake for their faith, on 21 May 1559

Cazalla was subjected to a carefully managed trial by the Inquisitor General, Fernando de Valdés, who communicated his findings to King Philip II. Upon a confession of heresy, the penalty was burning at the stake at a religious ceremonial auto-da-fé held in Valladolid on 21 May 1559. Those who recanted, were granted the mercy of strangulation before burning. His siblings Francisco de Buiero, Beatriz and Pedro were also prosecuted and sentenced to the stake. Two more, Costanza de Buiero and Juan Buiero, were condemned to wear the Sanbenito and perpetual imprisonment (in all, they were ten brothers). The corpse of his mother Doña Leonora de Buiero was disinterred and thrown into the fire and as the "heretical" Lutheran conventicles had taken place in her home, the house was razed to the ground. A marble 'column of infamy' erected in its place, bore an inscription prohibiting the rebuilding of the house, or removal of plaque under penalty of excommunication and banishment from the Spanish realms.

Scabrous details emerged excoriating Cazalla and the activities of the conventicle:

"A cleric named José Cazalia [sic] lives in a certain city of Castile; He had planted a false and diabolical doctrine among the ignorant, and he summoned them to his house at dusk, a porter opened the door to each caller, who man or woman alike, on giving the name 'Cazuela', was admitted; being assembled he would give his lecture, and extinguishing the lights he would say: "Hallelujah, each with his own". And so each man would grab the woman that chance, or malice, placed next to him."

... there was a case of a boy of 13 or 14 years, whose mother, each night after he had gone to bed, would leave the home. Unable to discover where she would go, one night he followed her, and on seeing that she came to the house, and that calling and giving the name she entered it... he decided to call and give the same name as the others and enter. Having entered he had seen everything that happened, and when it came to the extinguishing of the lights, he did as the others; moved by curiosity he had cut a piece of the "basquine" (tight-fitting bodice) of the woman who he had touched, to see if he could come to know one day where he had been that night; the boy went home understanding nothing of what he had seen, but noticing that the basquine of his mother was missing the piece he had cut in the house of Cazalla, he understood that his mother was the woman he had known carnally. The next day he had confessed his guilt, and so the King's doctor came to be discovered, imprisoned and punished by the Holy Office of the Inquisition, the house was sown with salt, and a stone plaque erected as an example and lesson to others for centuries to come.

An anecdote collected in a moralizing sermon of the 17th or 18th century: Given the alternative that was offered (being burned alive), the sincerity of Cazalla's retraction, although vehemently expressed, was considered questionable by a good many of the critical bibliographers, especially by Juan Antonio Llorente, and those present, such as his confessor, Antonio de la Carrera and the chronicler Antonio de Illescas take it for granted. He urged his companions in torture and execution, to recant. All, except Antonio Herrezuelo, recanted. Although he was known as "The Bachelor", he had a wife Leonor de Cisneros, who was among those who "reconciled" to the Roman Catholic faith. Upon discovering this on his way to the ceremonial cremation, he rebuked her harshly in passing. Herrezuelo's response to Agustín Cazalla was: "Doctor, I desire my soul now, not for a later time; and I never judged myself less than this judge." Hearing him speak in such manner a halberdier silenced him by wounding him with his weapon. He was burned alive.

One account attributed Cazalla's "heresy" to:

ambition and malice that so corrupted him, he was intent on disturbing the peace and tranquility of the realm with such novelties, and he believed he would be worshiped by all as another Lutheran in Saxony and that his disciples would continue the name of Cazalla.

In one of the various accounts of Cazalla's last words he addresses Princess Juana of Austria (sister of Philip II, regent in his name) who had presided over the Auto-da-fé, saying: "I gave you good doctrine; I preached well to you but for myself I chose the worst, I thought that this corruption was a golden mitre; and because of my evil works, I deserve what I get. Merciful Lady, remember my nephews, the children of the accountant Hernando Ortiz." After crying out to the executioner, "Oh brother, I believe, I believe," he kissed the cross and died.

== Memorial ==
Agustín Cazalla is considered a Protestant martyr and especially as a precursor for Spanish Protestants.

In Valladolid, the site of his house and the column of infamy was preserved until 1776, when it was replaced (the original presumably had deteriorated) by a tombstone with a rectangle surmounted by a triangle, or semicircle, and the inscription:

Paul IV presiding over the Church of Rome and Philip II reigning in Spain, The Holy Office of the Inquisition condemned to demolition and razing of this house of Pedro Cazalla and Dona Leonor Vibero, his wife, as Lutheran heretics who met to conspire against our Sta. Fe ch. and Church of Rome in the year 1559 on 21 May.

With the arrival of the Liberal Regime in 1820 the house was rebuilt on its original site, and the street was renamed 'Doctor Cazalla street'. His reputation was re-evaluated as an opponent of the Inquisition. Although the tombstone has not been preserved and no drawings exist, several copies of the text survive, some from the plate when it was dismantled and others from the City Council archives. Preserved texts attest the sign was replaced in 1776 due to deterioration. One text describes "a stone wall containing a sign manifesting his crime and his grief." A description thought to have been by an eyewitness, relates; "The first paragraph is written in a triangle and the second in a rectangle, so it is assumed that the plate had a semicircular shape at the top. Sangrador who wrote in Gothic script, says the sign was in a small hollow and closed by a wall." Leonor de Vivero, Cazalla's mother was erroneously named as his wife, due to a confusion of Pedro the father with Agustín the son of Pedro and Leonor.
