= John Bradford =

English Reformer and martyr (1510–1555)

The Reverend John Bradford
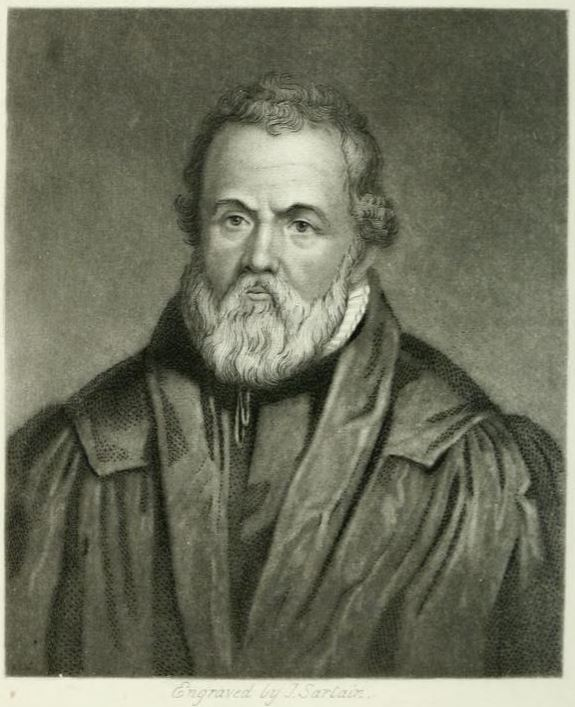
- Born: 1510; Blackley, Manchester, England
- Died: 1 July 1555 (age 44–45); Smithfield, London, England
- Education: Catharine Hall, University of Cambridge and Pembroke College, Cambridge
- Church: Church of England
- Ordained: 1550
- Offices held: Prebendary

John Bradford (1510–1555) was an English Reformer, prebendary of St. Paul's, and martyr. He was imprisoned in the Tower of London for alleged crimes against Queen Mary I. He was burned at the stake on 1 July 1555.

== Life ==
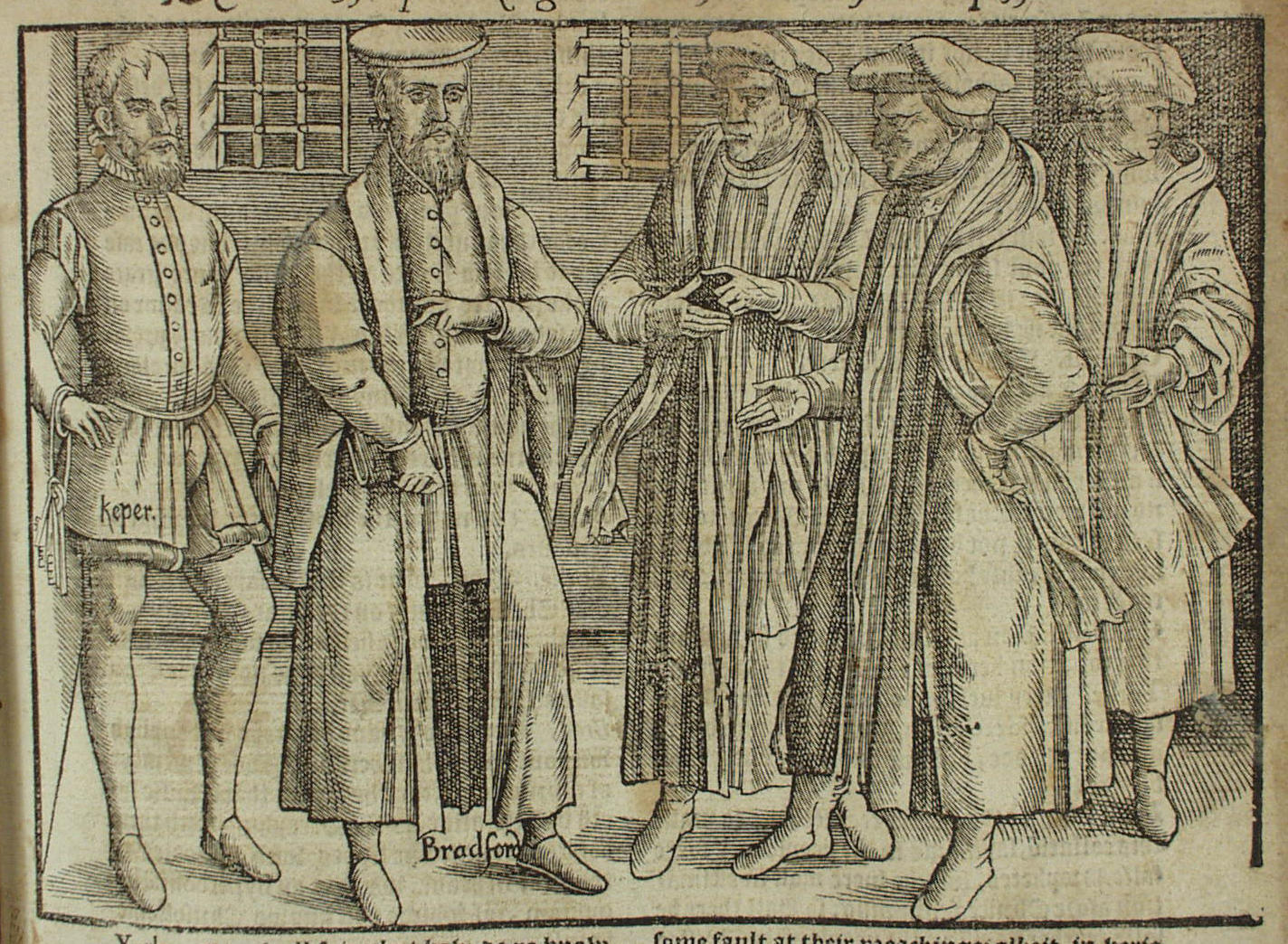
Bradford (second left) in prison with bishops, from Foxe's Book of Martyrs

Bradford was born in the village of Blackley, near Manchester in 1510. He was educated at a grammar school. Talented with numbers and money, he later served under Sir John Harington of Exton in Rutland as a servant. Through his good influence and abilities in auditing and writing, he gained favour and trust with his employer and at the Siege of Montreuil in 1544, occupied the office of paymaster of the English army during the wars of Henry VIII. Later, he became a law student at the Inner Temple in London. Through the contact and preachings of a fellow student, he became acquainted with and converted to the Protestant faith. This caused him to abandon his legal studies and in 1548, he took up theology at Catharine Hall (now St Catharine's College), University of Cambridge. In 1549 he was awarded his MA and in that same year was appointed to a fellowship at Pembroke College, Cambridge.

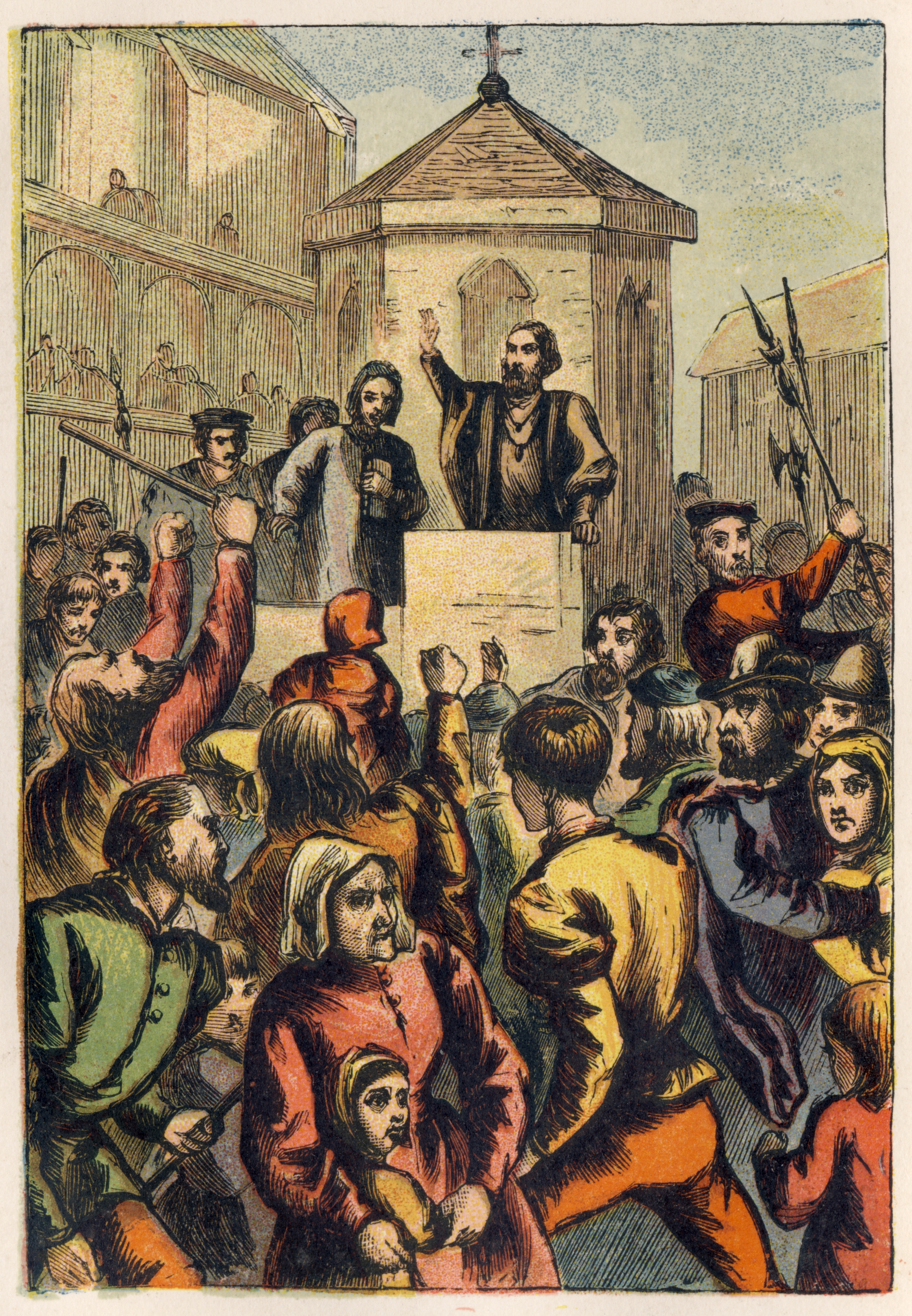
Bradford Appeasing the Riot at St. Paul's Cross

At this institution he was often referred to with the nickname "Holy Bradford" not from malice but out of respect for his dedication to God and his unselfish attitude. In August 1550 he was ordained deacon by Bishop Nicholas Ridley and appointed as his personal chaplain. He began preaching in churches in London under the mentorship of Ridley and Hugh Latimer. His gifts in preaching the Biblical faith led to his appointment in 1551 as Chaplain to King Edward VI and Prebendary of St Paul's Cathedral. He continued as a Fellow of Pembroke and as a roving preacher, mainly in London, Lancashire and Cheshire.

Following the death of Edward VI in 1553, Mary I acceded to the throne, restoring rights and protections to Catholics. In the first month of the new monarch's reign, Bradford was arrested and imprisoned on the charge of "subversion and trying to stir up a mob" and committed to the Tower of London. At the time "stirring up a mob" was a serious and dangerous act, leading to riot and possible death, and certainly major disturbance to society. During his time in prison, he continued to write religious works and preach to all who would listen. For a time whilst in the Tower, Bradford was put in a cell with three other reformers, Archbishop Thomas Cranmer, Ridley, and Latimer. Their time was spent in careful study of the New Testament.

== Death ==
On 31 January 1555, Bradford was tried and condemned to death. Bradford was taken to Newgate Prison to be burned at the stake on 1 July. Bradford was given a special "Shirt of Flame" by a Mrs. Marlet, for whom he had written a devotional work. This was a clean shirt that was sewn specifically for the burning, made in the style of a wedding shirt. "This clothing with a new shirt to wear at the stake became a common feature at the burnings, a way of signaling support for and honouring the victim, as though he were being dressed as a bridegroom for a wedding." Also, the ceremonial donning of the shirt of flame could be seen as similar to the priest donning his vestments, thus subverting Catholic ritual. "...and so the martyr might pray over and kiss the shirt before putting it on... underlining their oneness with Christ and the fact they were willing to die..."

A large crowd delayed the execution, which had been scheduled for 4 o'clock in the morning, as many who admired Bradford came to witness his death. He was chained to the stake at Smithfield with a young man, John Leaf. Before the fire was lit, he begged forgiveness of any he had wronged, and offered forgiveness to those who had wronged him. He then turned to Leaf and said, "Be of good comfort brother; for we shall have a merry supper with the Lord this night!" A century later, in his Worthies of England, Thomas Fuller wrote that he endured the flame "as a fresh gale of wind in a hot summer's day, confirming by his death the truth of that doctrine he had so diligently and powerfully preached during his life."

Bradford is commemorated at the Marian Martyrs' Monument in Smithfield, London. He is also commemorated with one of the six statues on the exterior of Manchester Town Hall marking people important in the early history of the city.

== Phrase attribution ==
There is a 19th-century tradition tracing to Bradford the idiomatic "There but for the grace of God go I" as an expression of humility and reliance on God's grace rather than his own morality. The editor of The Writings of John Bradford, Aubrey Townsend, notes this in his preface:

The familiar story, that, on seeing evil-doers taken to the place of execution, he was wont to exclaim, "But for the grace of God there goes John Bradford", is a universal tradition which has overcome the lapse of time.

— vol. 2 (1843) p. xliii

The tradition of attribution of the phrase to Bradford dates to at least the early 19th century, as it is found in A treatise on prayer by Edward Bickersteth (1822):

The pious Martyr Bradford, when he saw a poor criminal led to execution, exclaimed, "there, but for the grace of God, goes John Bradford". He knew that the same evil principles were in his own heart which had brought the criminal to that shameful end.

— p. 60

While the phrase, or its attribution to Bradford, cannot be traced to before 1800, Townsend notes that there is a 17th-century attribution of a similar sentiment to Bradford, demonstrating how "by the sight of others' sins, men may learn to bewail their own sinfulness". According to this tradition, Bradford, "when he saw any drunk or heard any swear, &c., would railingly complain, 'Lord I have a drunken head; Lord, I have a swearing heart.'"

However there are other attributions for the phrase "there but for the grace of God"; Sir Arthur Conan Doyle (in the voice of Sherlock Holmes) attributes the phrase to Richard Baxter (1615–1691) in The Boscombe Valley Mystery (1891):

Why does fate play such tricks with poor, helpless worms? I never hear of such a case as this that I do not think of Baxter's words, and say, "There, but for the grace of God, goes Sherlock Holmes."

The phrase has also been attributed to John Newton (1725–1807) and in Catholic tradition to Philip Neri (1515–1595).

== See also ==
- List of people burned as heretics
- Protestant Reformers
