= Joan Bocher =

English Anabaptist executed in 1550

Joan Bocher (died 2 May 1550 in Smithfield, London) was an English Anabaptist burned at the stake for heresy during the English Reformation in the reign of Edward VI. She has also been known as Joan Boucher or Butcher, or as Joan Knell or Joan of Kent.

== Life ==
Bocher's origins are unclear, but it is known that families named Bocher and Knell lived in the area round Romney Marsh. She was associated with Anabaptists in Kent, some of them immigrants who had fled persecution in the Low Countries (Belgium, the Netherlands, and Luxembourg). In the 1530s and 1540s she was "much in favour in reforming circles" in Canterbury.

Her first conflict with church and state came after she spoke against the sacrament of the altar, but she was released from imprisonment by a commissary of Thomas Cranmer and Christopher Nevinson. This leniency was held against Nevinson when he was charged in 1543 with involvement in the Prebendaries' Plot.

Bocher developed an interest in Anabaptist ideas, and took up the idea of Christ's celestial flesh, "not incarnate of the Virgin Mary". She was arrested as a heretic in 1548 and convicted in April 1549. Then followed a year's imprisonment during which various well-known religious figures were enlisted to try to persuade her to recant. She was unmoved, and Cranmer was involved in bringing her to the stake on 2 May 1550, though accounts of him forcing Edward VI to sanction this—with Edward "driven to pen the mandates", as Wordsworth put it—may be inaccurate. John Foxe approached royal chaplain John Rogers to intervene to save Joan, but Rogers refused with the comment that burning was "sufficiently mild" for a crime as grave as heresy. Rogers himself was later burnt during the Marian persecutions.

== Anecdotes ==
Some well-known stories about Bocher were first recounted by Robert Parsons in 1599: for instance, Joan's friendship with Anne Askew and her involvement in smuggling Tyndale's New Testament into England, and into the royal court under her skirts. According to Parsons in A temperate ward-word, he had learned these things from someone who had been present at her trial.

== See also ==
- List of people burned as heretics
