= Gertrude Cordovana =

Gertrude Maria Cordovana (died 6 April 1724) was an Italian nun. She was executed by the Inquisition in Palermo in Sicily for heresy because of her claim that she had intercourse with God. She was executed after having been imprisoned for 25 years. Her case and execution attracted a great deal of attention.

== Biography ==
Gertrude Cordovan was a nun of the Order of St Benedict. In 1699, she was tried by the Inquisition on Sicily alongside brother Romualdo, a monk of the Order of St Augustine, who was charged with Quietism and Molinism, while Cordovana was charged with pride, vanity and hypocrisy. She claimed to have had sexual intercourse with God, and described herself as pure and holy.

Both were imprisoned, but they refused to recount their views despite food and water deprivation and torture. Gertrude Cordovana remained in prison for 25 years. In 1724, the Inquisition gave up their attempt to make them repent and applied for their executions, which were approved by the bishop of Albarucin, the grand inquisitor of Spain and the Holy Roman Emperor.

Both were executed at the square of San Erasmo in Palermo the morning of 6 April 1724. The execution attracted great attention and was attended by the public, the Inquisition, the senate, the viceroy, the city government and the nobility, as well as the remaining 26 prisoners of the Inquisition. Cordovana was taken to the place of execution in a grand procession before Romualdo. After she had mounted the stake, her hair and her clothes were set on fire by the help of certain liquids before the stake itself was set at fire, burning her to death.

== Sources ==
- S. Horner; History of the Kingdom of Naples 1734-1825
- Fiume, Giovanna; Il santo moro: i processi di canonizzazione di Benedetto da Palermo (1594-1807), 2000
