= Ana Rodrigues (settler) =

Ana Rodrigues (died 1593), was a Portuguese Jewish woman who settled in Brazil, and became one of the first victims of the Portuguese Inquisition. Born in Covilha, Portugal, She emigrated from Portugal to Bahia in Brazil with her spouse in 1557.

Ana was married to a man named Heitor Antunes, who was also her second cousin. Together they had seven children. Both were known as New Christians: Jewish people who had been forced to convert to Christianity, under threat of exile. Ana and Heitor were both of Jewish descent, and Heitor even claimed that the Maccabeans were his ancestors. They were possibly forcibly 'converted' to Christianity and baptized by force as children.

In Brazil, Ana and Heitor operated a clandestine synagogue within their home in the community of Matoim, though in public they posed as Catholics. Upon his death, which took place sometime between 1575 and 1577, Heitor's burial was conducted according to Jewish tradition.

In 1591, over a decade after Heitor's death, officials of the Inquisition came to Bahia and denounced him. The inquistors began even deeper persecution, and, amidst their stringent investigations, instructed locals to report any potential signs that someone might be practicing Judaism.

By this time, Ana was a very elderly woman - some sources claim she was 80, though she may have been 100. As a widow, she had taken over the sugarcane business she and her husband had once run together. She had also continued to practice Judaism, and to instruct her daughters in Judaism (in fact, she may have started the first school for girls in Brazil). The local community viewed these actions with malice. Thus, when the Inquisition arrived, she was accused of having led her family into practicing Judaism in a secret synagogue. She was accused of being a "Judaizer", and her entire family was questioned.

When Ana herself was questioned, she tried to claim to be Christian, but was not believed. She confessed to performing some actions that were part of Judaism and Jewish tradition, but tried to claim she hadn't been aware they were associated with Judaism, insisting such actions had been taught to her by a godmother, long dead. These claims were most likely false.

In 1593 she was arrested, and deported to Lisbon, where she was judged guilty. She died in prison in 1593, awaiting sentencing. In 1604 she was posthumously sentenced to have her image burned in public as an effigy, and her bones were disinterred and burnt.

Ana's children - and grandchildren - suffered brutally under the Inquisition as well. Her daughter, Violante, was also arrested in 1593 and, like her mother, died in prison that same year. Officials twice arrested another daughter, Leonor, in 1592 and 1593. Another daughter, Beatriz, had for a long time assisted her mother in the synagogue; Beatriz was arrested in 1601. In 1603 she was "sentenced to an auto". In hopes of avoiding further persecution, many of Ana Rodrigues' descendants changed their surnames, particularly to those used by well-established Old Christians in the area, and sought intermarriage with the aforementioned Old Christians, in hopes of appearing more believably Christian themselves.
