= María de los Dolores López =

Spanish visionary executed for heresy

María de los Dolores López (? in Sevilla – 24 August 1781, in Sevilla), known as Beata Dolores, was a Spanish visionary executed for heresy.

She was born in Sevilla and a member of a clerical family: her brother was a priest, and her sister was a nun. At the age of twelve, she became blind. At that point, she left her home to live with her confessor as his mistress. From about 1767, she became known as a visionary. She claimed to be in contact with Jesus Christ and the angels. Rumors also circulated that she had relations with the Devil. The Spanish Inquisition was aware of these rumors, but did not take action.

In 1779, her confessor confessed to the Inquisition to release his guilt over their sexual relationship.

Before the tribunal, she stated that she had been blessed with special relations to heaven since the age of four: she claimed to have had intercourse with the Virgin Mary, that she had been married to Jesus in heaven with St. Joseph and St. Augustin as witnesses, that she had liberated millions of souls from purgatory, and presented the molinist view that sin ceased to be sin when God wills it.

At this time, execution by burning, though still legal, was no longer well seen, and the Inquisition attempted to avoid such an execution. During the investigation, several scholars were called to persuade her to confess her regret and submit. She refused to regret, and stated that God had revealed to her that she should die a martyr. She was sentenced to death by burning for heresy on 22 August 1781.

On her way to execution, however, she made a confession of regret to a priest. Therefore, she was granted the privilege of strangulation before the pyre was lit.
