= Francisca Hernández =

Spanish mystic

Francisca Hernández, was a Spanish mystic.

She was a spiritual leader of the Alumbrados among the Franciscan friars of Valladolid. Her visions were influenced by erotic elements. She was the subject of a heresy process by the Spanish Inquisition, lasting between 1530 and 1534.
