= Joan Boughton =

English martyr

Joan Boughton (c. 1410s – 28 April 1494) was an English Lollard and martyr.

== Biography ==
Boughton was a widow of 80 years or more (fourscore years of age or more) who held views associated with the pre-Luther English church reformer John Wycliffe. She was described as "an old cankered heretic, weak-minded for age." She was said to be the mother of a woman named married to Sir John Young, also suspected of following Wycliffe. Boughton would not recant her beliefs and was burnt at the stake as a heretic at Smithfield, London on 28 April 1494. Boughton was supposedly "in such reverence for her virtues, that, during the night after her martyrdom, her ashes were collected" so that they could be preserved and kept as a relic.

In English historian and martyrologist John Foxe’s Acts and Monuments, Boughton is the first recorded female Christian martyr. She also is thought to be the oldest person ever executed in London.

== In popular culture ==
In Hilary Mantel's Wolf Hall trilogy of historical novels, Thomas Cromwell witnesses her execution as a boy. Cromwell helps the Lollards who gather remains of Boughton after the execution crowd has departed.
