= Na Prous Boneta =

French beguine leader, 1296–1328

Na Prous Boneta (1296–1328), was a French beguine. She was put on trial before the Inquisition in Carcassonne on 6 August 1325, and is known for the confession she gave.

== Biography ==
She was born in La Cadière-et-Cambo and moved to Montpellier during her childhood. In 1305, she promised to save her virginity to God and had her first spiritual vision. From at least 1315, she lived as a beguine in a house in Montpellier with her sister Alisseta and a woman named Alaraxis. The house was frequented by many visitors, both male and female, dressed in robes of the Franciscan order without actually being monks or nuns. From 1317, Boneta had a leading position among the beguines of Languedoc during a period of persecution against them. In 1321, she experienced mystic revelations, in which she saw herself as the embodiment of the words of God, and brought forward a message of the apocalypse.

In 1325, she was arrested with several other beguines. During her trial, she defended her right to the freedom of speech and belief to the inquisitors. She was imprisoned and spent the following three years in prison. On 11 November 1328, she was sentenced to be executed by burning as a relapsed heretic and a heresiarca, a teacher of heresy. There were concerns from the Pope that her execution, if performed in Carcassonne or Montpellier, would result in riots because she was well known there.
