= Leonor de Cisneros =

Leonor de Cisneros (1536, in Valladolid – 26 September 1568, in Valladolid), was a Spanish Protestant who was executed for heresy by the Spanish Inquisition and regarded as a Protestant martyr. Her case belongs amongst the most famed of the Spanish Inquisition.

Leonor de Cisneros married the lawyer and scholar Antonio Herrezuelo, or Herezuello, (known also as "The Bachelor Herezuello de Torro") in 1553. In 1554, she and her husband became members of the secret Protestant congregation, or "conventicle", in Toro, which was founded by Carlos de Seso and comprised about 70 people.

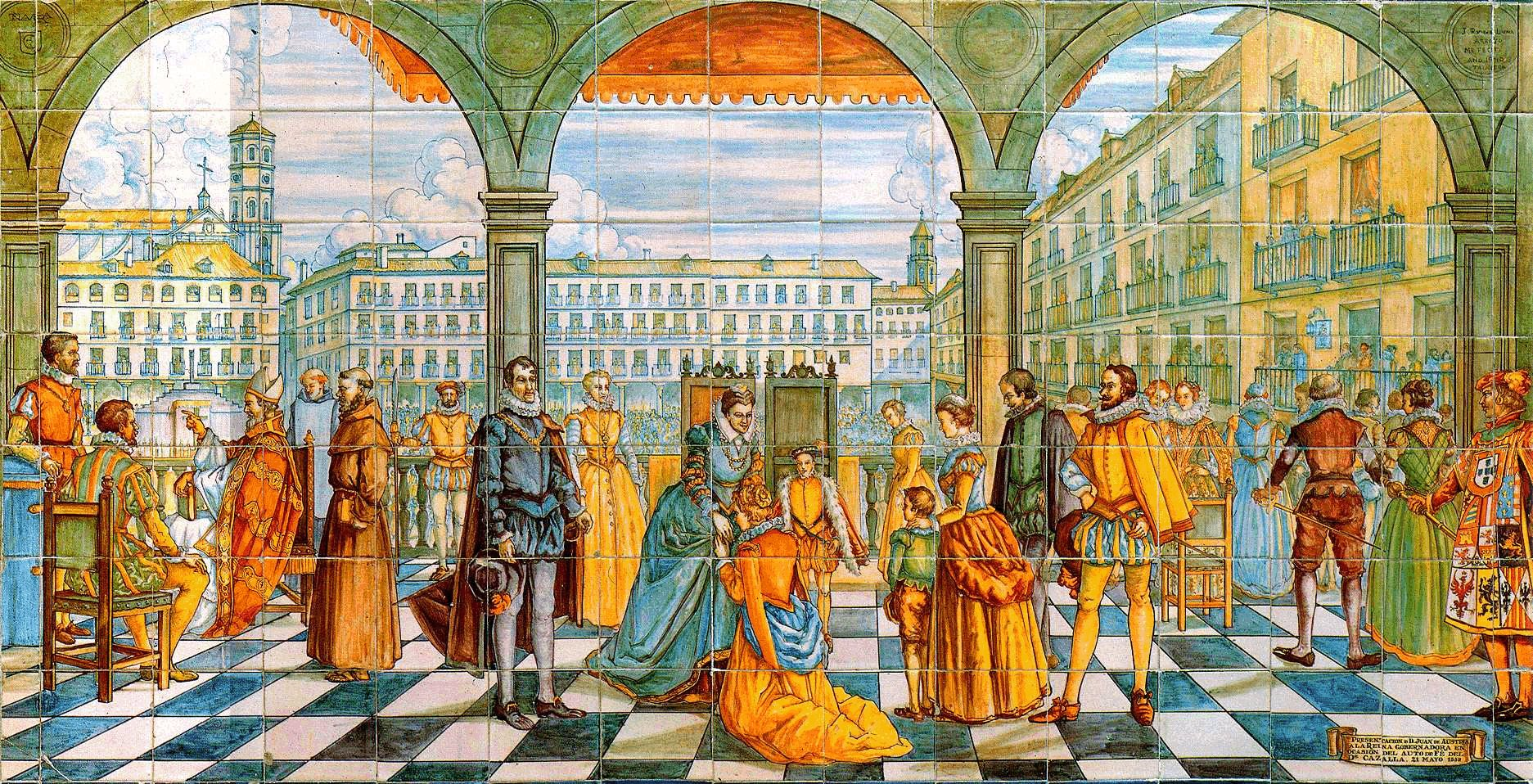
Auto-da-fé of Doctor Cazalla, in Valladolid.

In 1559, the entire congregation, headed by Augustino de Cazalla, was arrested and tortured under interrogation by the Spanish Inquisition. Upon confession to heresy, they were led to an official auto-da-fé in Valladolid on May 21, 1559, Trinity Sunday, in the presence of the royal family - the Prince of Spain, the Princess of Portugal, and the Governess (of Spain) - where faced with renunciation of their Lutheran faith, repentance for heresy and submission to the imprisonment of the Inquisition, or being burned at the stake, several, to be spared execution, abjured. Among those who abjured was Leonor de Cisneros. Her husband, Antonio, with thirteen others refused to forswear and were condemned to burning at the stake. Being led to his death and passing his wife he angrily rebuked her. The Venetian Ambassador with King Philip at that time, Paulo Tiepolo, wrote of the executions to the Doge and Senate on May 28, 1559:

"At Valladolid, ten of the principal noblemen of that Province (Leon) have been burnt for heresy."

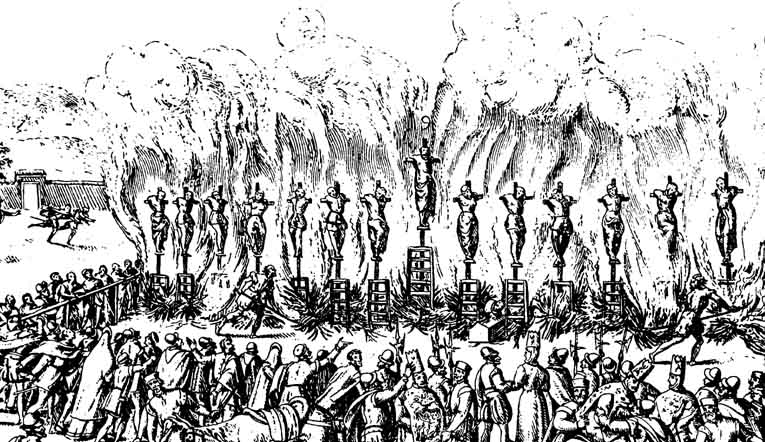
Contemporary illustration of the auto-da-fé of Valladolid, in which fourteen Protestants were burned at the stake for their faith, on May 21, 1559

Writing on 16 June 1559, Tiepolo enclosed a list of individuals condemned by the Inquisition, with the following details:

"The Bachelor Herezuello de Torro, sentenced to confiscation of his property and to be burnt. He was burnt alive, as he persevered in his heresy, remaining gagged the whole time, not having ever chosen to acknowledge the Holy Church of Rome."

From Tiepolo's letter we learn that "Leonor de Cisneros de Toro" was condemned to three years' imprisonment in a Benedictine monastery, and to confiscation of her property. Leonor reportedly having regretted her decision after Antonio's execution, returned to her Protestant faith and openly proselytised amidst the prisoners, thereby deliberately wishing to be tried as a "relapso" (relapsed heretic) and executed. Leonor de Cisneros was subsequently found guilty as a "relapsed incorrigible heretic" and sentenced to being burnt alive at the stake (without prior strangulation). The sentence was carried out at Valladolid.
