= Francis Kett =

English priest and heretic

Francis Kett (c. 1547–1589) was an Anglican clergyman burned for heresy.

== Life ==
Kett was born in Wymondham, Norfolk, the son of Thomas and Agnes Kett, and the nephew of the rebel Robert Kett, the main instigator of Kett's Rebellion.

Although Kett's father died while he was still a boy he was able to attend university thanks to support from his mother's second husband. After being admitted to Clare College, Cambridge in 1566, Francis graduated BA from Corpus Christi College, Cambridge in 1570. After proceeding MA in 1573 he was elected a fellow of that college. At some point he also entered holy orders.

In 1580 Kett resigned his fellowship and studied medicine, graduating MD in 1581, and in 1585 "Francis Kett, doctor of phisick" published 'The Glorious and Beautiful Garland of Man's Glorification, containing the godly misterie of heavenly Jerusalem', a book dedicated to Queen Elizabeth: and also in 1585 'An epistle [s]ent to divers [pa]pistes in England prouing [th]e Pope to bee the beast in the [1]3 of the Reuelations, and to be the man exalted in the temple of God, as God, Thess. 2.2 ...

However, in 1588 Edmund Scambler, the Bishop of Norwich, brought charges of heresy against him. Kett's views, if the charges against him were accurate, seem to have approximated to Arianism: he believed Jesus was not God but a good man who had suffered "only as Jesus already, and shall suffer hereafter as Christ" (that is, that having returned to earth Jesus would "suffer againe for the sinnes of the world" and eventually become divine). Kett also had millenarian beliefs, claiming that "Christ is now in his human nature gathering a church in Erthe in Judea"; and that "this year of our Lord 1588 divers Jews shall be sent to divers countries to publish the new covenant". Another account reports that he also believed in psychopannychism or soul sleep, that the soul lapses into a state of unawareness between death and resurrection on the Day of Judgment. The puritan minister William Burton reported with horror Kett's denial of Christ's divinity, that "Christ is not God, but a good man as others be"; but he also observed that however "monstrous" Kett's beliefs he gave every appearance of being a good man, continually praising God, praying and reading the Bible.

In late 1588 Scambler wrote to Lord Burghley urging that Kett should be executed with all speed, and he was accordingly burnt to death in the ditch of Norwich Castle on 14 January 1589. William Burton was a witness of his final suffering:

...when he went to the fire he was clothed in sackecloth, he went leaping and dauncing: being in the fire, above twenty times together clapping his hands, he cried nothing but blessed bee God … and so continued until the fire had consumed all his nether partes, and until he was stifled with the smoke.

It has been suggested that Kett's unorthodox opinions might have influenced the free-thinking views of Christopher Marlowe, who was also a student at Corpus Christi. However Kett's time as Fellow only overlapped the arrival of the young Marlowe by three or four months.
