= Ana de Castro =

María Francisca Ana de Castro, called La bella toledana (ca.1686 – December 23, 1736) was a Spanish immigrant to Peru, renowned for her beauty and hauteur. She was arrested in 1726, accused of "judaizing" (being a practicing Jew). She was burned at the stake after an auto de fe in 1736. This event was a major spectacle in Lima, but it raised questions about possible irregular procedures and corruption within the Inquisition.

== Early life ==
Ana de Castro was born in Toledo, Spain. She and her second husband, a merchant in Lima, arrived in Peru in 1707, together with the new viceroy, Manuel de Oms y de Santa Pau. Her great beauty was mentioned in most written accounts of her by contemporaries. She was also said to be extremely haughty. For example, she was said to attend mass in the Plaza de la Recoleta in her carriage, but without descending from it. She was a wealthy and cultivated member of society in Lima. She was also accused of being promiscuous — there were rumors that she had had an affair with one of the royal viceroys. (If true, this was probably Oms or José de Armendáriz, viceroy from 1724 to 1736).

== Arrest, imprisonment, torture and execution ==
The story of her arrest is as follows. Out of revenge, one of her ex-lovers bribed a maid in her household to hide a crucifix beneath her mattress. He then denounced her to the Inquisition, claiming that she was guilty of whipping an image of Christ. An investigation turned up the image among her bed linen and she was arrested.

Women were exempt from torture by the Inquisition, but nevertheless, the Supreme Council of the Inquisition in Lima voted to subject her to torture to obtain a confession. In her ten years in prison she was tortured three times, and she had twenty audiences with the inquisitors in order to give her an opportunity to confess. Her considerable property, estimated at 22,000 pesos, was confiscated.

She apparently did not confess to the major charges against her, although she admitted to some Jewish observances she believed were not incompatible with Catholicism (observing the Sabbath and mourning the dead, things she had learned as a child). She was said to have revealed under torture that her sister and some other relatives had been burned by the Inquisition in Seville for impenitence, that she herself had been implicated in the crime, and that she had been asked to whip a small child to death as an act of judaizing but had only witnessed the act.

In 1736, in spite of a ruling from Spain that she be spared, she was paraded through the streets of Lima on a mule, subjected to a sermon, turned over to the secular arm, and then burned at the stake. A crowd of 10,000 jeering spectators witnessed her execution. She was accompanied by other prisoners, but they were sentenced to lesser penalties. Her ashes were thrown into the Rímac River.

== Irregularities ==
There were irregularities in her case, recognized at the time. As a woman, she should not have been subjected to torture. Some witnesses reported seeing signs of repentance when she was paraded through Lima to the stake, something that should have spared her life but didn't. There was also a directive from Spain barring her execution, which was ignored. Fiscal (public prosecutor) Mateo de Amusquíbar accused Cristóval Sánchez Calderón, inquisitor from 1730 to 1748, of executing her for the spectacle, and as a demonstration of the power of the Inquisition. To this might be added the motive of confiscation of her property. Amusquíbar accused Sánchez Calderón of corruption — mismanaging funds and personally profiting from the fines he imposed. Sánchez Calderón was arrested and expelled from Lima, but allowed to return in 1747.

The Holy Tribunal banned discussion of her case, under pain of excommunication.

== See also ==
- Peruvian Inquisition

== Sources ==
- Toribio Medina, José, Historia del tribunal de la Inquisición de Lima: 1569-1820, vol. II, chapter 25. This is available on-line here (in Spanish):
- Williams, Jerry M. "A New Text in the Case of Ana de Castro: Lima's Inquisition on Trial". This is available on-line (in .pdf format) here:
