= Matthew Hamont =

English Unitarian and martyr

Matthew Hamont (died 20 May 1579) was a Norfolk ploughwright, accused of heresy, who was burnt at the stake in Norwich Castle by the Church of England. Hamont, who came from Hethersett, was a Unitarian.

The Bishop of Norwich, Edmund Freke, accused Hamont of denying Christ to be a Saviour. On 19 May 1579 his ears were cut off and the following day, 20 May 1579, he was burned to death at Norwich Castle.

== Life ==
In the Hethersett parish registers the surname is spelt Hamonte, Hammonte, and Hammante. According to Alexander Gordon, he was probably of Dutch origin.

Early in 1579 he was cited before Edmund Freke on a charge of denying Christ. The articles exhibited against him represented him as a coarse kind of deist, holding the Gospel to be a fable, Christ a sinner, and the Holy Ghost a nonentity. William Burton stated of his beliefs:

I haue knovven some Arrian heretiques, whose life hath beene most strict amongest men, whose tongues haue beene tyred with scripture upon scripture, their knees euen hardned in prayer, and their faces wedded to sadnesse, and their mouthes full of praises to God, while in the meane time they haue stowtly denied the diuinitie of the Sonne of God, and haue not sticked to teare out of the Bible all such places as made against them; such were Hamond, Lewes, and Cole, heretikes of wretched memorie, lately executed and cut off in Norwich.

Other authorities also describe Hamont as an Arian. He was condemned in the consistory court on 13 April, and handed over to the custody of the sheriff of Norwich. His offences were aggravated by a further charge of 'blasphemous words' against the Queen and council, for which he was sentenced to lose his ears, and for his heresy to be burned alive. On 20 May 1579 his ears were cut off in the Norwich market-place, and he was burned in the castle moat.

Hamont left a widow, who died in 1625; he had a son Erasmus. John Lewes, mentioned above, was burned at Norwich on 18 September 1583; Peter Cole, a tanner of Ipswich, met the same fate at Norwich in 1587.

== Legacy ==
More than a century later the case was taken up by Philip van Limborch who corresponded on the subject in 1699 with John Locke.

In a BBC special, A Brief History of Disbelief, Jonathan Miller quoted Hammond's beliefs—for which he was tortured and killed:

Christ is not God, not the saviour of the world, but a mere man, a sinful man and an abominable idol. All who worship him are abominable idolaters and Christ did not rise again from death to life nor did he ascend into heaven.
