= Leonor de Vivero =

Spanish victim of the Inquisition

Leonor de Vivero (died 1558), was a Spanish Lutheran noblewoman. She was executed by burning by the Spanish Inquisition for heresy.

She was married to the royal accountant Pedro Cazalla. They had Jewish origins, and both belonged to the circle of the mystic Francisca Hernández. Leonor de Vivero participated in a Protestant circle that gathered in her house and was accused of having conspired against the Catholic church.

== Life ==
Her family belonged to the nobility, they had been counters of Castile and members of both the Valladolid bourgeois oligarchy and the courtly aristocracy. Leonor's father, Juan de Vivero, second of this noble family, married Constanza Ortiz, from Jewish family converted to Catholicism.

=== Heresy charge ===
Her mother died in 1524, and proceedings against her began in 1526 for the delation of a maid who accused her of Judaizing despite having been reconciled. Other maids corroborated these accusations and Leonor and her brother Alonso Pérez de Vivero testified in her favor. Alonso de Vivero was also suspected of Judaizing and maintaining contacts with Blessed Francisca Hernández, who had been accused as illuminated and after Lutheran. Francisca Hernández had stayed between 1520 and 1527 at the house of Leonor de Vivero and her husband.
