= Miguel de Almazán =

Miguel de Almazán was a Marrano of Saragossa, and private secretary to King Ferdinand of Aragon. He was burned at the stake on the accusation of being an adherent of Judaism. One month later, March 18, 1486, Manuel de Almaçan of Saragossa suffered the same fate.
