= Pedrosa =

Pedrosa is a Spanish and Portuguese surname that originates from the town of Pedrosa in Northern Spain and Portugal. Derived from the Latin word pedra meaning "rock", there's several locations in the Iberian Peninsula named after it. Notable people with the surname include:

- Adrià Pedrosa, Spanish footballer
- Adriano Pedrosa, Brazilian curator
- Cyril Pedrosa, French comic book artist, colorist and writer
- Dani Pedrosa, Spanish Grand Prix motorcycle racer
- Inês Pedrosa, Portuguese journalist, novelist, short story writer, children's writer and playwright
- Rafael Pinto Pedrosa (born 2007), German footballer
- Veronica Pedrosa, Filipino independent broadcast journalist, news presenter and moderator

== See also ==
- Coma Pedrosa, the highest mountain in the principality of Andorra
