= Bentinck Street Elm Trees =

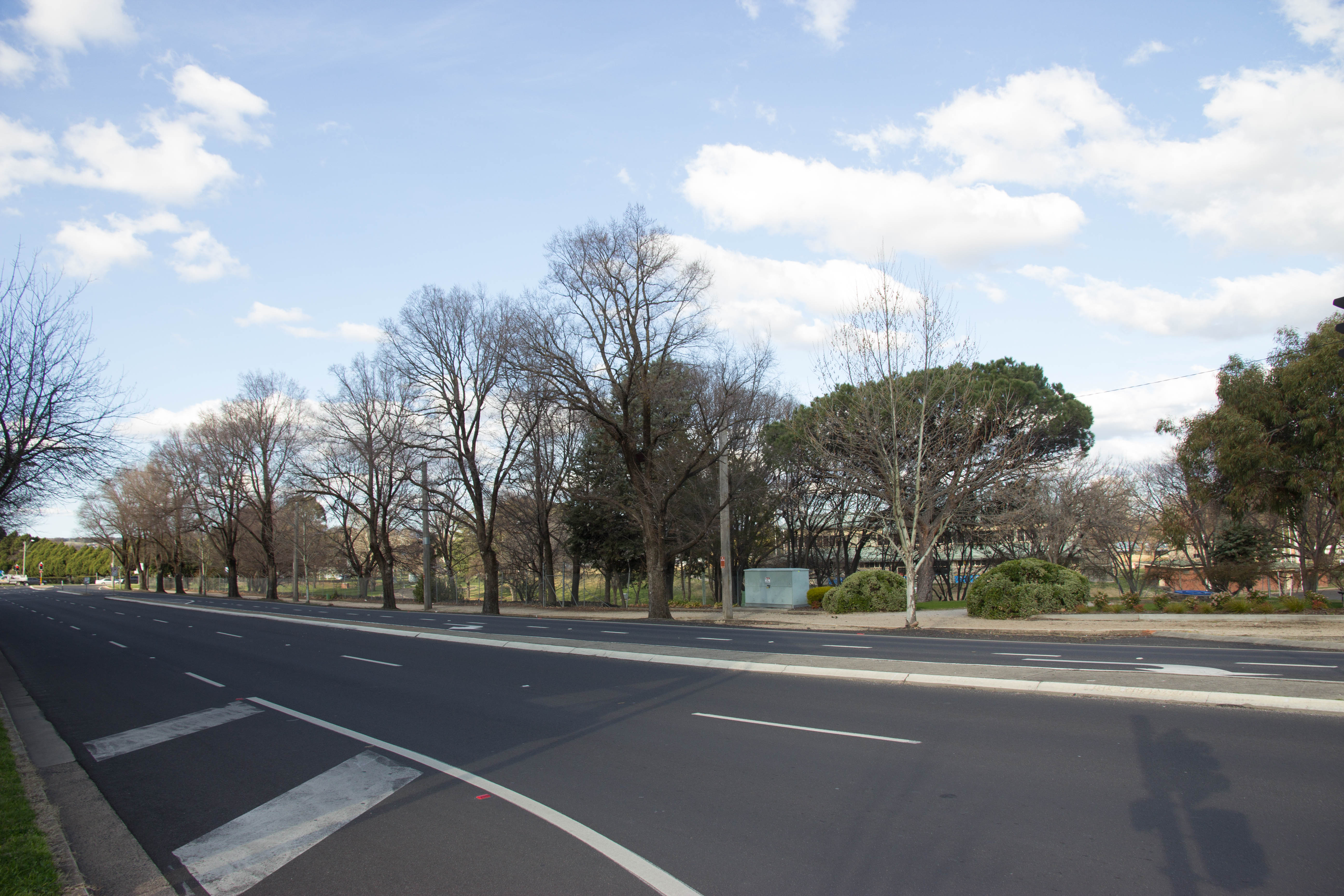
- Bentinck Street elm trees, pictured in late winter 2018.

- Location within New South Wales Location within Australia
- 33°25′06″S 149°35′03″E
- Location: Bentinck Street, Bathurst, Bathurst Region, New South Wales, Australia

Site notes
- Owner: Bathurst Regional Council

New South Wales Heritage Register
- Official name: Bentinck Street Elm Trees
- Type: state heritage (landscape)
- Designated: 2 April 1999
- Reference no.: 369
- Type: Tree groups – street
- Category: Parks, Gardens and Trees

The Bentinck Street Elm Trees is a heritage-listed row of street trees along Bentinck Street, Bathurst, in the Central West region of New South Wales, Australia. The trees are owned and maintained by the Bathurst Regional Council. They were added to the New South Wales State Heritage Register on 2 April 1999.

== History ==
The Bentinck Street elms were planted around 1904 and later pollarded.

English elms were favoured/ planted between c. 1880 and c. 1920 – corresponding with the date of Bentinck Street's elms. Elms are a defining tree of the c. – c. 1900 ('Federation') era in Bathurst and a number of inland Australian and NSW country towns of this period (e.g.: Ballarat, Bendigo, Albury, Orange, Wagga Wagga). They were a favoured species of street tree in the second Municipal Street Tree Period in NSW (c. 1880–1920). Key Bathurst parks such as Machattie Park, and "competing" parks such as Robertson and Cook Parks, Orange all feature magnificent, mature English elms.

It is significant that downtown Bathurst is characterised by mature elms – as is its chief historical rival, downtown Goulburn. These are the two major early inland cities of NSW.

In 1984 the Bathurst Action Committee to Secure Unified Planning (BACSUP) contacted the Heritage Council in regard to a proposed 7 lane roadway traffice enhancement scheme that would lead to the removal of 20 elm trees along Bentick Street.

After discussions and meetings with Bathurst Council and consideration of the trees streetscape and historic significance a section 136 Order was signed and placed on 16 trees on 22 August 1994.

At the 6 September 1984 Heritage Council meeting, Bathurst Council presented a detailed submission and discussed alternative solutions to the proposed 7 lane roadway. The Heritage Council resolved to engage an independent consultant acceptable to both the Heritage Council and Bathurst City Council to provide advice on alternative road reconstruction proposals, with consideration of the heritage value of the street trees. The Heritage Council also resolved to recommend to the Minister the making of an Interim Conservation Order be placed over the trees. The Order was gazetted on 14 September 1984.

In late 1984 three separate section 60 applications were subsequently received. One application was to remove all 16 trees, the second to undercut the trees to a clearance of 5.3 metres and the third to trim the trees. After consideration the Heritage Council resolved to approve the removal of trees on the western side of Bentinck street, approve undercutting to a maximum height of 4.8 metres above the road and approve the application to trim the trees.

At its meeting of 6 December 1984 the Heritage Council resolved that it considered it necessary to ensure the trees' future to recommend to the Minister that a Permanent Conservation Order be placed on the 16 elm trees.

An exemption under section 57(2) of the Heritage Actwas approved in for periodic regravelling, emergency and routine work to water mains and electrical installations and routine pruning.

A Permanent Conservation Order was placed on 16 August 1985. The trees were transferred to the State Heritage Register on 2 April 1999 (Heritage Office files).

== Description ==
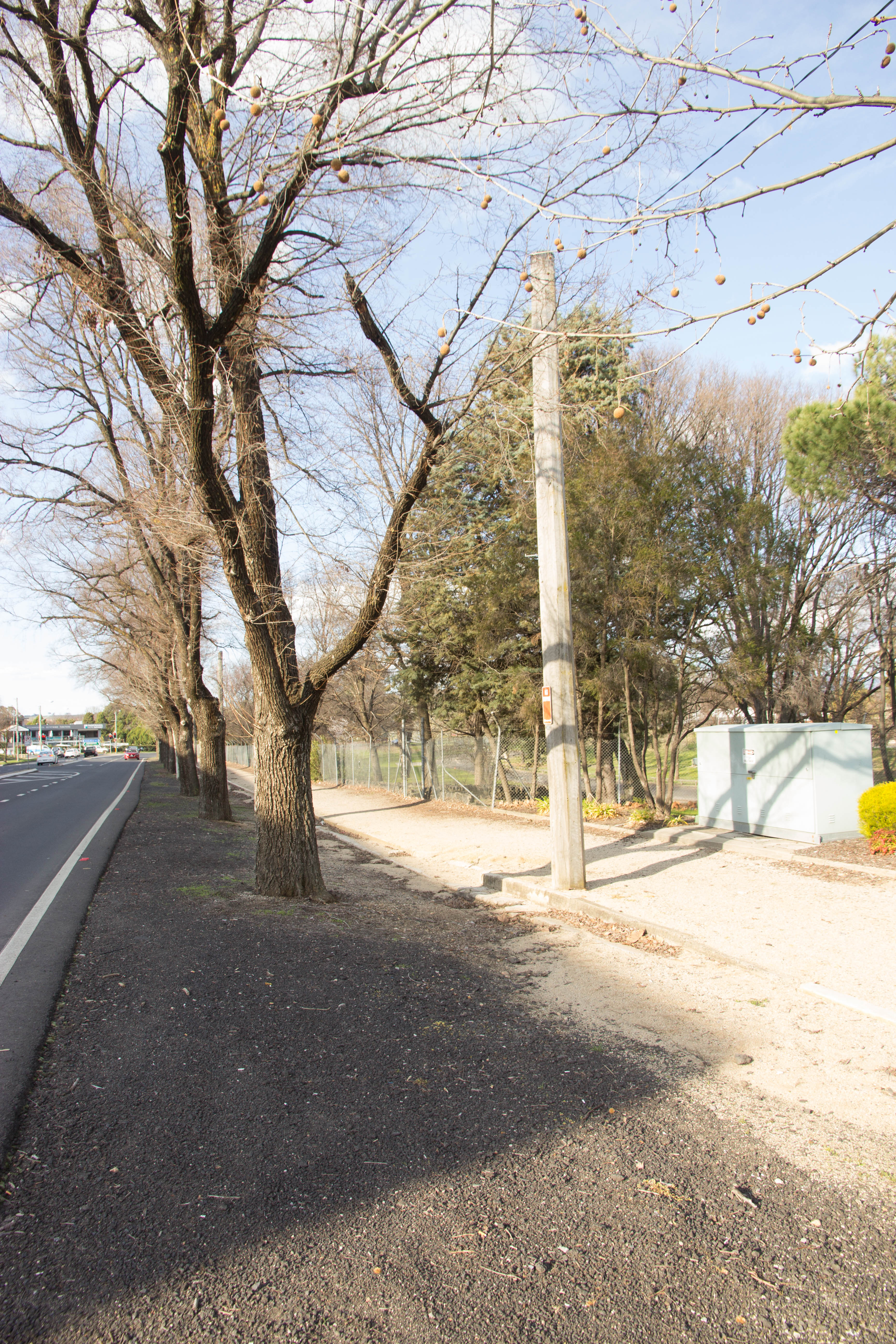
Bentinck Street Elm Trees, late winter 2018

The Bentinck Street English elms (Ulmus procera) form a healthy, evenly spaced avenue of trees of uniform growth to a height of approximately 9–12 metres. The trees are an English elm (Ulmus procera) and are often used as an ornamental tree for parks and large gardens and it is deciduous. There are 13 on the eastern side and 3 on the western side of Bentinck Street between Howick and Durham Streets (Heritage Office files).

There is a row of thirteen mature elm trees on the eastern side of Bentinck Street (Carrington Park) & three recently planted trees on the western side of Bentinck Street.

== Heritage listing ==
The mature Bentinck Street English elms were planted about 1900. They make a significant contribution to the historic townscape of Bathurst.

Bentinck Street Elm Trees was listed on the New South Wales State Heritage Register on 2 April 1999.
