= Ulmus minor 'Atinia' =

Hybrid species of tree

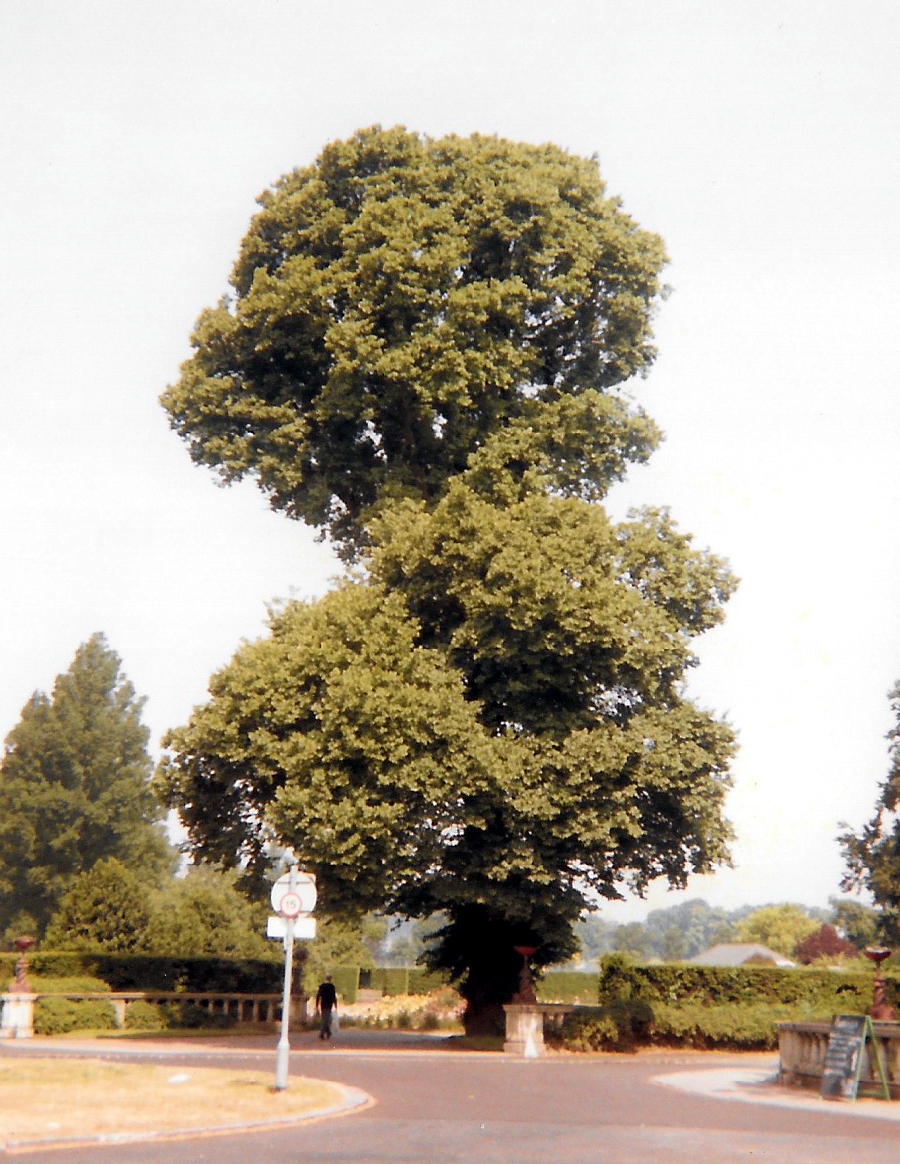
- English Elm, Brighton, 1992
- Species: Ulmus minor
- Cultivar: 'Atinia'
- Origin: Italy

The field elm (Ulmus minor) cultivar 'Atinia' , commonly known as the English elm, formerly common elm and horse may, and more lately the Atinian elm, was, before the spread of Dutch elm disease, the most common field elm in central southern England, though not native there, and one of the largest and fastest-growing deciduous trees in Europe. R. H. Richens noted that elm populations exist in north-west Spain, northern Portugal, and on the Mediterranean coast of France that "closely resemble the English elm" and appear to be "trees of long standing" in those regions rather than recent introductions. Augustine Henry had earlier noted that the supposed English elms planted extensively in the Royal Park at Aranjuez from the late 16th century onwards, specimens said to have been introduced from England by Philip II and "differing in no respects from the English elm in England", behaved as native trees in Spain. He suggested that the tree "may be a true native of Spain, indigenous in the alluvial plains of the great rivers, now almost completely deforested".

Richens believed that English elm was a particular clone of the variable species Ulmus minor, referring to it as Ulmus minor var. vulgaris. A 2004 survey of genetic diversity in Spain, Italy, and the UK confirmed that English elms are indeed genetically identical, clones of a single tree, said to be Columella's 'Atinian elm', once widely used for training vines, and assumed to have been brought to the British Isles by Romans for that purpose. Thus, despite its name, the origin of the tree is widely believed to be Atina, Lazio, in Italy, the home town of Columella, whence he imported it to his vineyards in Cádiz, although the clone is no longer found in Atina and has not yet been identified further east.

Max Coleman of the Royal Botanic Garden, Edinburgh writes: "The advent of DNA fingerprinting has shed considerable light on the question. A number of studies have now shown that the distinctive forms that Melville elevated to species and Richens lumped together as field elm are single clones, all genetically identical, that have been propagated by vegetative means such as cuttings or root suckers, as the flowers are completely sterile. This means that enigmatic British elms such as ... English elm have turned out to be single clones of field elm." Most flora and field guides, however, do not list English elm as a form of U. minor, but rather as U. procera .

The variable field elms of East Anglia and eastern Kent, Ulmus minor subsp. minor, are sometimes incorrectly labelled "English elm". As Richens noted (1955), ornamental plantings aside, "U. procera hardly occurs east of a line running from Peterborough to Waltham".

== Synonyms (chronological) ==
- Ulmus sativa Mill.
- Ulmus campestris L. var. vulgaris Aiton
- Ulmus procera Salisb.
- Ulmus atinia J. Walker
- Ulmus surculosa Stokes
- [Ulmus suberosa Smith, Loudon, Lindley - disputed]
- Ulmus minor Mill. var. vulgaris (Aiton) Richens
- Ulmus minor Mill. subsp. procera (Salisb.) Franco.
- Ulmus procera 'Atinia'

== Description ==
The tree often exceeded 40 m (about 130 ft) in height with a trunk less than 2 m (6.5 ft) in diameter at breast height (dbh). The largest specimen ever recorded in England, at Forthampton Court, near Tewkesbury, was 46 m (151 ft) tall. While the upper branches form a fan-shaped crown, heavy, more horizontal boughs low on the bole often give the tree a distinctive 'figure-of-eight' silhouette. The small, reddish-purple hermaphrodite apetalous flowers appear in early spring before the leaves. The samara is nearly circular. The leaves are dark green, almost orbicular, < 10 cm long, without the pronounced acuminate tip at the apex typical of the genus. They flush a lighter green in April, about a month earlier than most field elms. Since the tree does not produce long shoots in the canopy, it does not develop the markedly pendulous habit of some field elms. The bark of old trees was described by Richens as "scaly rather than longitudinally grooved". The bark of English elm suckers, like that of Dutch elm suckers and of some field elm, can be corky, but Dutch elm suckers may be distinguished from English by their straighter, stouter twigs, bolder 'herringbone' pattern, and later flushing.

The tree is both female- and male-sterile, natural regeneration being entirely by root suckers. Seed production in England was often unknown in any case. By the late 19th century, urban specimens in Britain were often grafted on to wych elm rootstock to eliminate suckering; Henry noted that this method of propagation seldom produced good specimens.

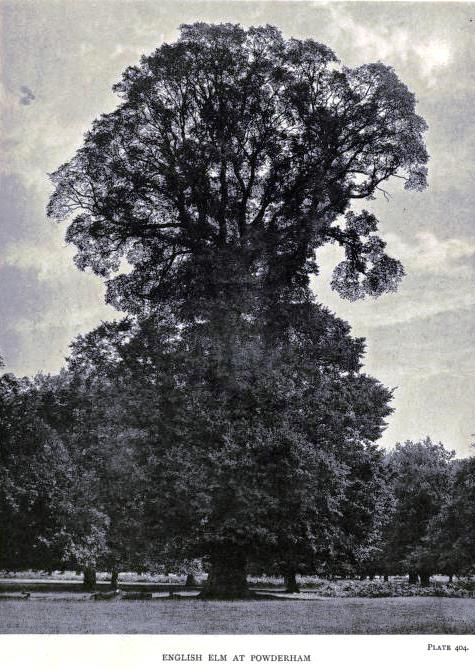
English Elm at Powderham, before 1913

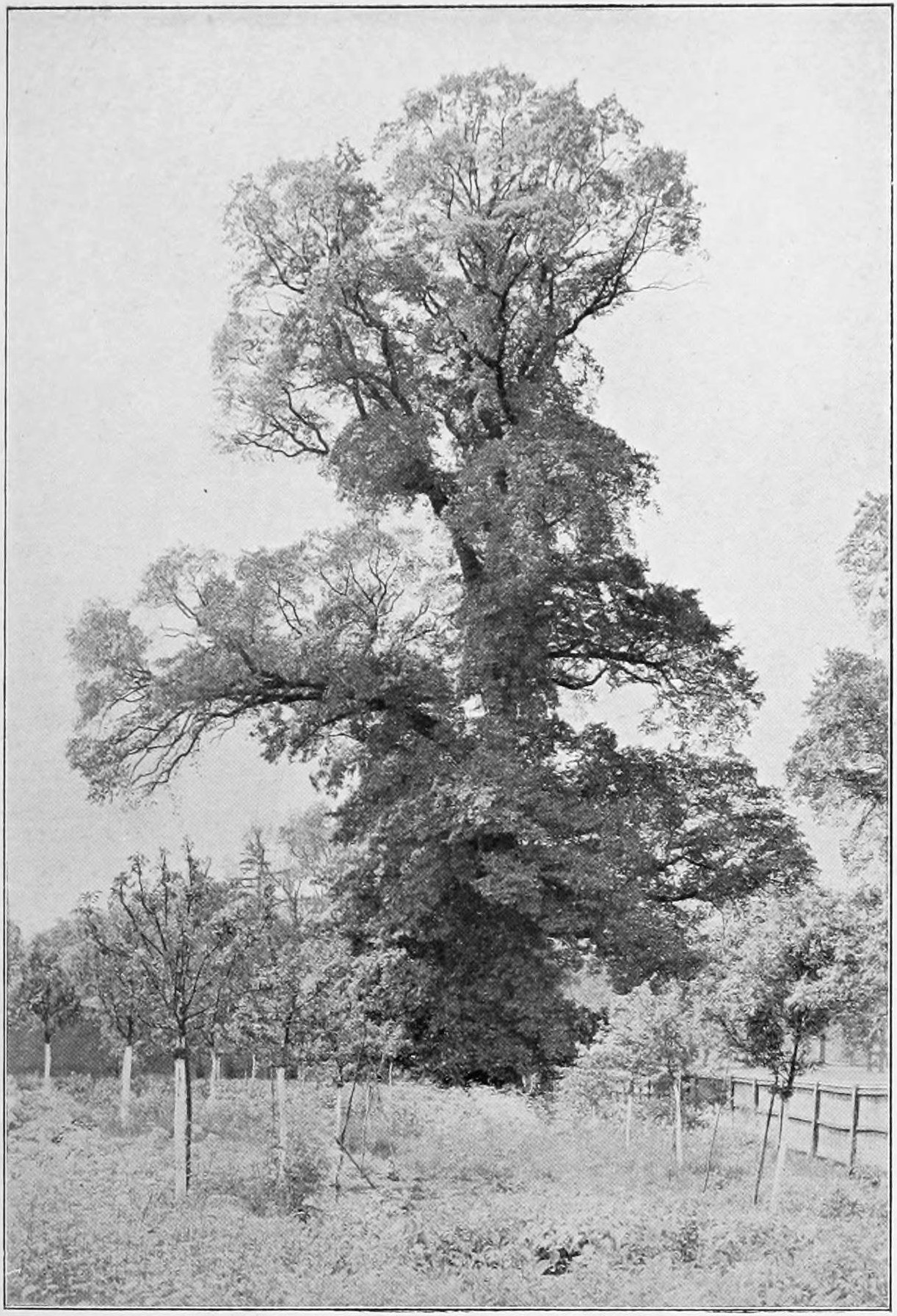
English Elm, 1904

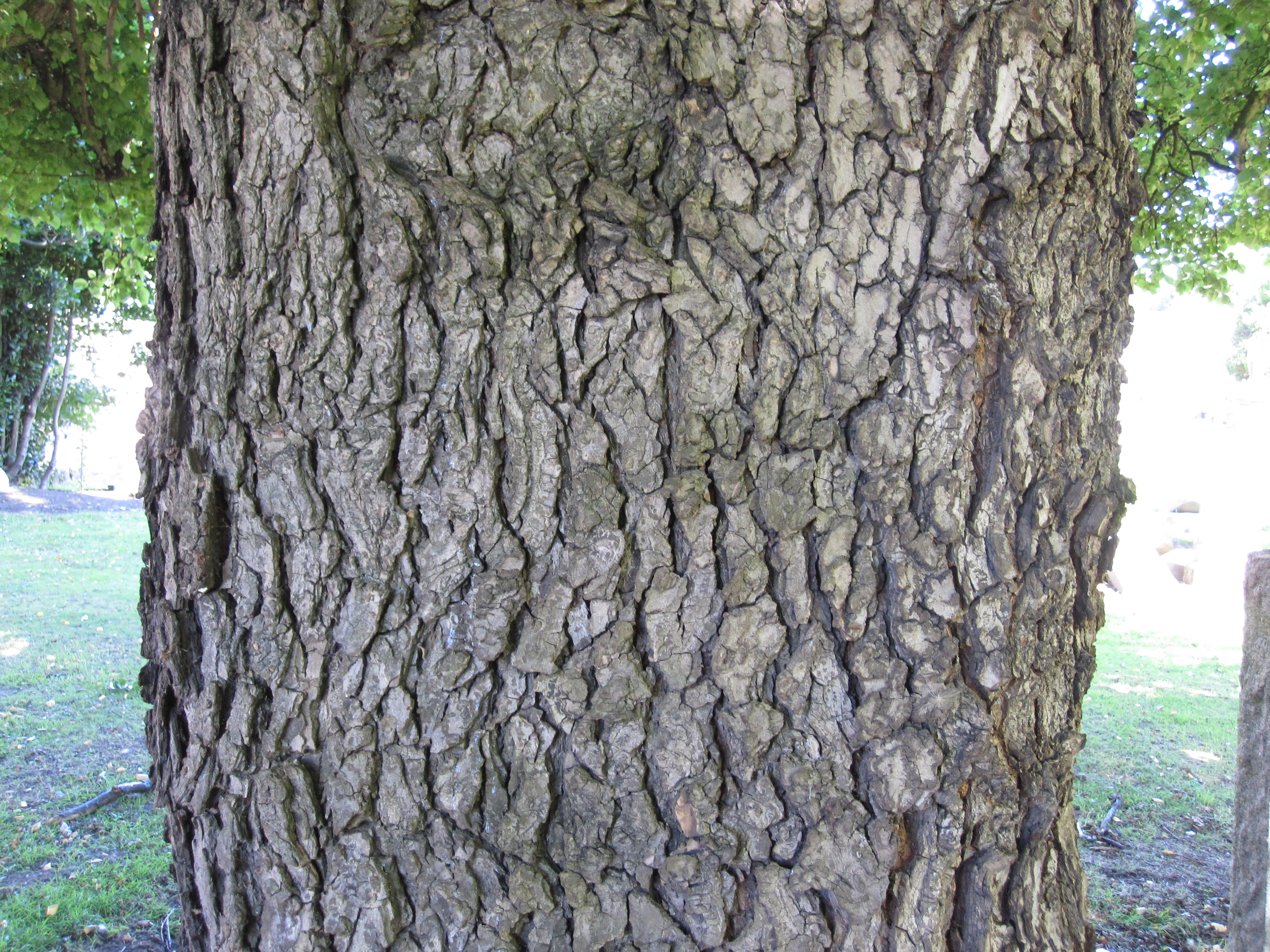
Bark of English elm

Leaves from a specimen tree in Sussex, England (2009)

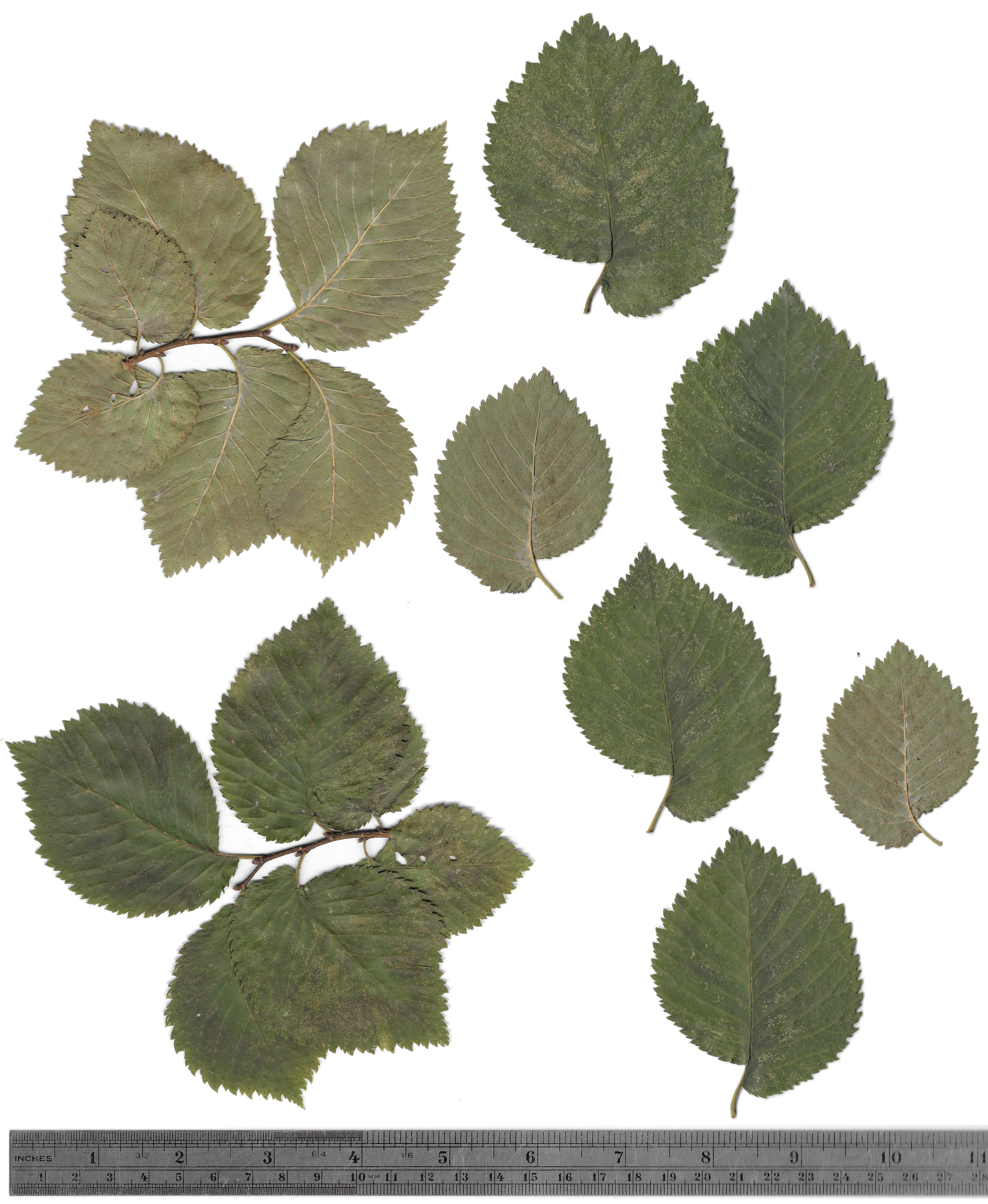
Dried short-shoot leaves of mature trees in Edinburgh (August)

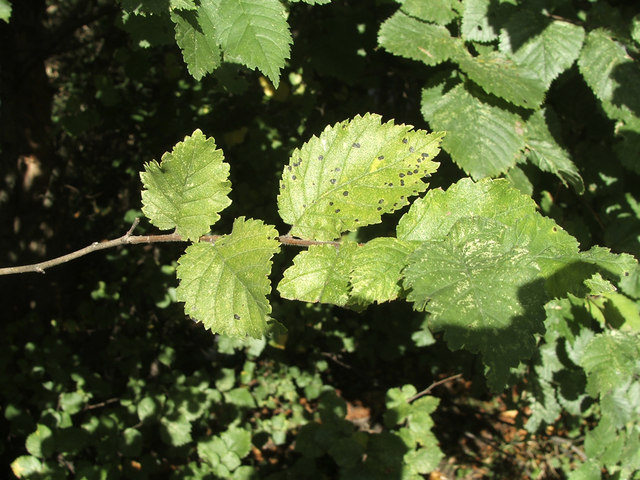
Juvenile leaves in hedgerow

== Pests and diseases ==
Owing to its homogeneity, the tree has proven particularly susceptible to Dutch elm disease, but immature trees remain a common feature in the English countryside courtesy of the ability to sucker from roots. After about 20 years, these suckers, too, become infected by the fungus and killed back to ground level. English elm was the first elm to be genetically engineered to resist disease, at the University of Abertay Dundee. It was an ideal subject for such an experiment, as its sterility meant no danger exists for its introgression into the countryside.

In the United States, English elm was found to be one of the most preferred elms for feeding by the Japanese beetle Popillia japonica.

The leaves of the English elm in the UK are mined by Stigmella ulmivora.

== Uses ==
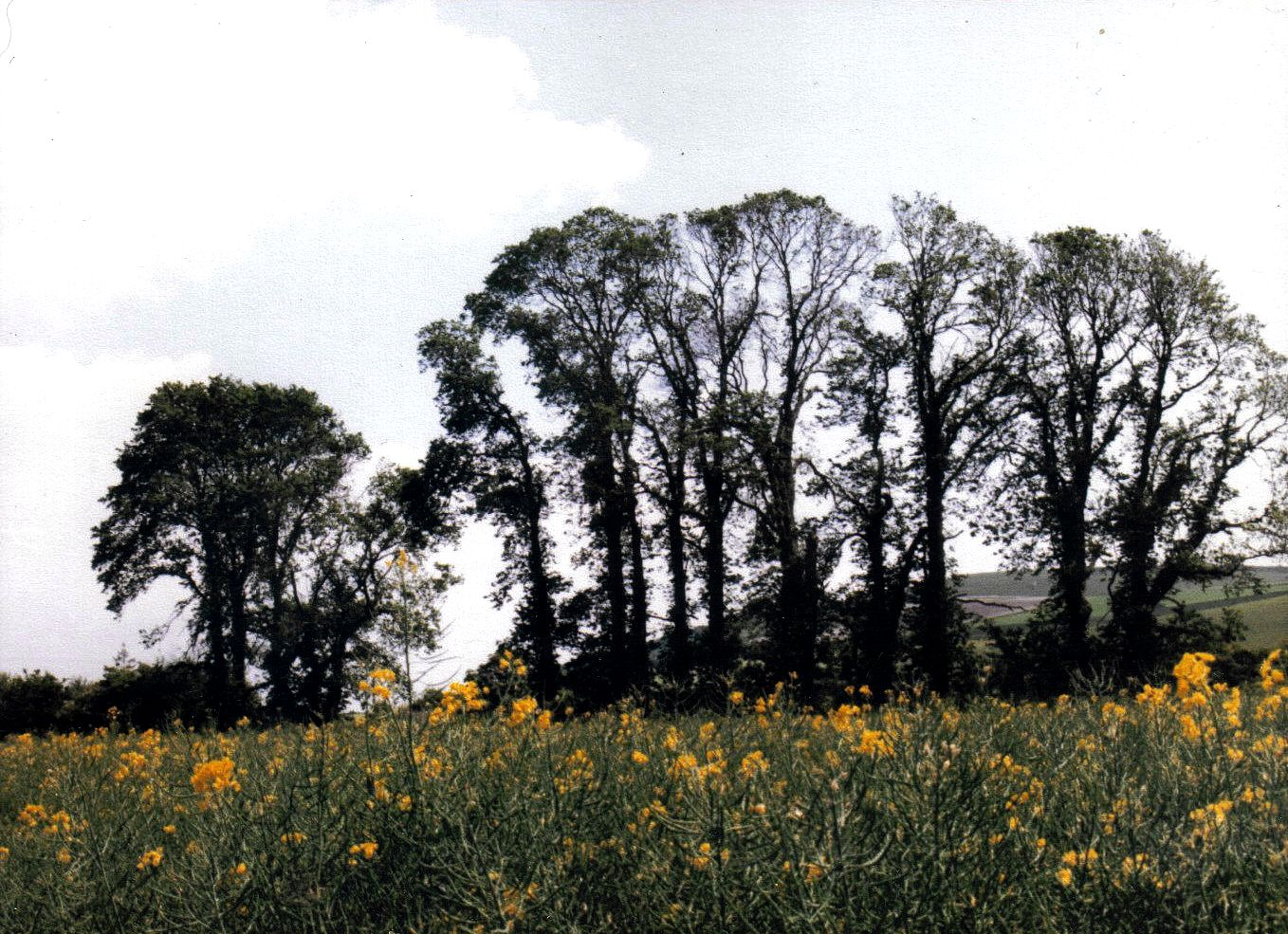
English elms in hedgerow, Alfriston, East Sussex (1996)

... He liked to be alone, feeling his soul heavy with its own fate. He would sit for hours watching the elm trees standing in rows like giants, like warriors across the country. The Earl had told him that the Romans had brought these elms to Britain. And he seemed to see the spirit of the Romans in them still. Sitting there alone in the spring sunshine, in the solitude of the roof, he saw the glamour of this England of hedgerows and elm trees, and the labourers with slow horses slowly drilling the sod, crossing the brown furrow, and the chequer of fields away to the distance.

– From D. H. Lawrence, The Ladybird (1923).

The English elm was once valued for many purposes, notably as water pipes from hollowed trunks, owing to its resistance to rot in saturated conditions. It is also very resilient to crushing damage, and these two properties led to its widespread use in the construction of jetties, timber piers, lock gates, etc. It was used to a degree in furniture manufacture, but not to the same extent as oak, because of its greater tendency to shrink, swell, and split, which also rendered it unsuitable as the major timber component in shipbuilding and building construction. The wood has a density around 560 kg/m^{3}.

However, English elm is chiefly remembered today for its aesthetic contribution to the English countryside. In 1913, Henry Elwes wrote, "Its true value as a landscape tree may be best estimated by looking down from an eminence in almost any part of the valley of the Thames, or of the Severn below Worcester, during the latter half of November, when the bright golden colour of the lines of elms in the hedgerows is one of the most striking scenes that England can produce".

== Cultivation ==
The introduction of the Atinian elm to Spain from Italy is recorded by the Roman agronomist Columella. It has also been identified by Heybroek as the elm grown in the vineyards of the Valais, or Wallis, canton of Switzerland. Although no record has been found of its introduction to Britain from Spain, the tree has been long believed to have arrived with the Romans, a hypothesis supported by the discovery of pollen in an excavated Roman vineyard. Pliny, however, in his Natural History pointed out that the Atinian elm was not considered suitable for vineyards on account of its dense foliage. The tree was used as a source of leaf hay. Elms said to be English Elm, and reputedly brought to Spain from England by Philip II, were planted extensively in the Royal Park at Aranjuez and the Retiro Park, Madrid, from the late 16th century onwards. Richens noted that samples from Aranjuez and Mondoñedo in the Cambridge Herbarium were indistinguishable from English material.

More than a thousand years after the departure of the Romans from Britain, English elms found far greater popularity, as the preferred tree for planting in the new hawthorn hedgerows in south-central England, appearing as a consequence of the Enclosure movement, which lasted from 1550 to 1850. In parts of the Severn Valley, the tree occurred at densities over 1000 per km^{2}, so prolific as to have been known as the 'Worcester weed'. In the eastern counties of England, however, hedgerows were usually planted with local field elm, Ulmus minor subsp. minor, or with suckering hybrids. When elm became the tree of fashion in the 18th and 19th centuries, avenues and groves of English elm were often planted, among them the elm groves in The Backs, Cambridge. In 1927 the largest tree, height (118 ft.) and girth (15 ft. 11 in.) combined, of any on the Westonbirt estate was an English elm. Perhaps the most famous English Elm avenue was the double row in the Long Walk, Windsor Great Park, Berkshire, planted in the 1680s on the advice of John Evelyn, and described by Elwes as "one of the finest and most imposing avenues in the world". The elms were felled in 1943.

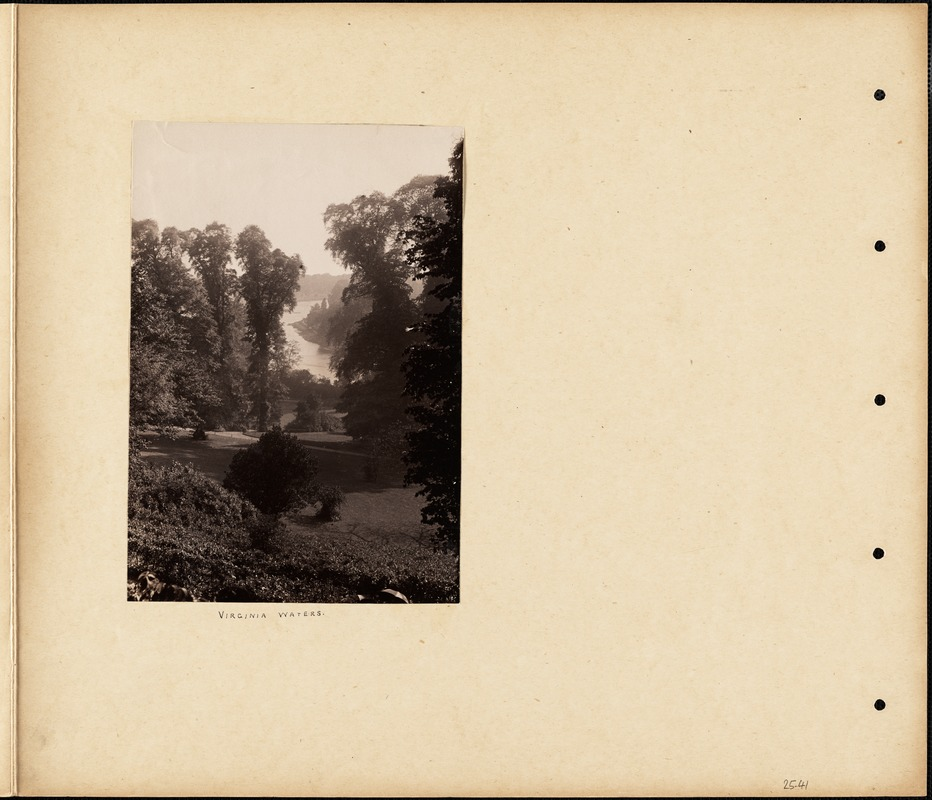
English elms, Virginia Water, Surrey (early 1890s)

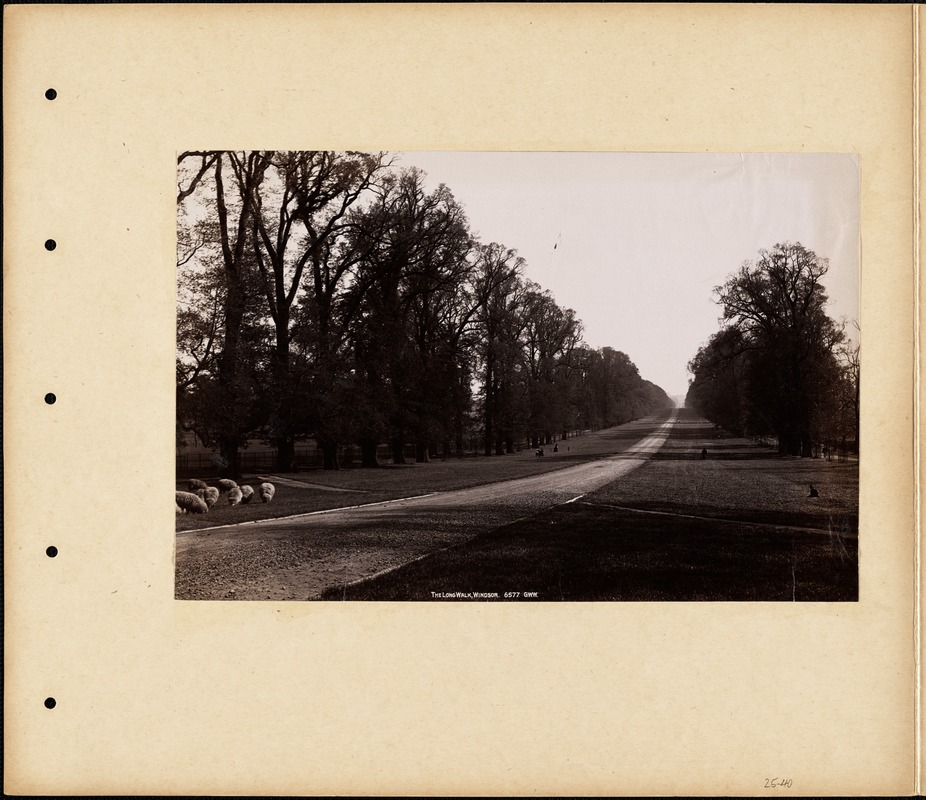
The Long Walk, Windsor Great Park, English elm avenue (early 1890s)

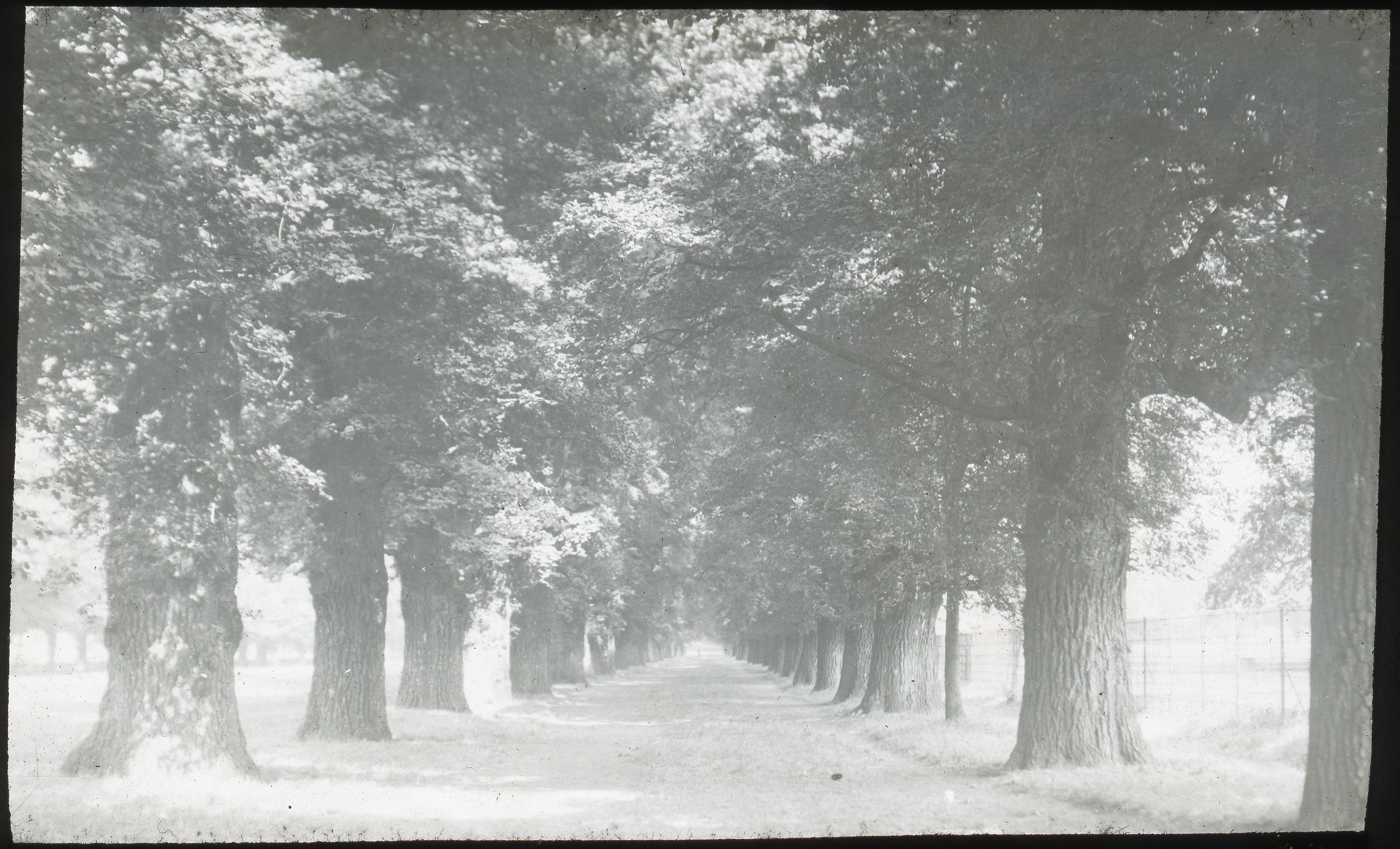
English elm avenue near Windsor, photograph by Edmund F. Arras (1913)

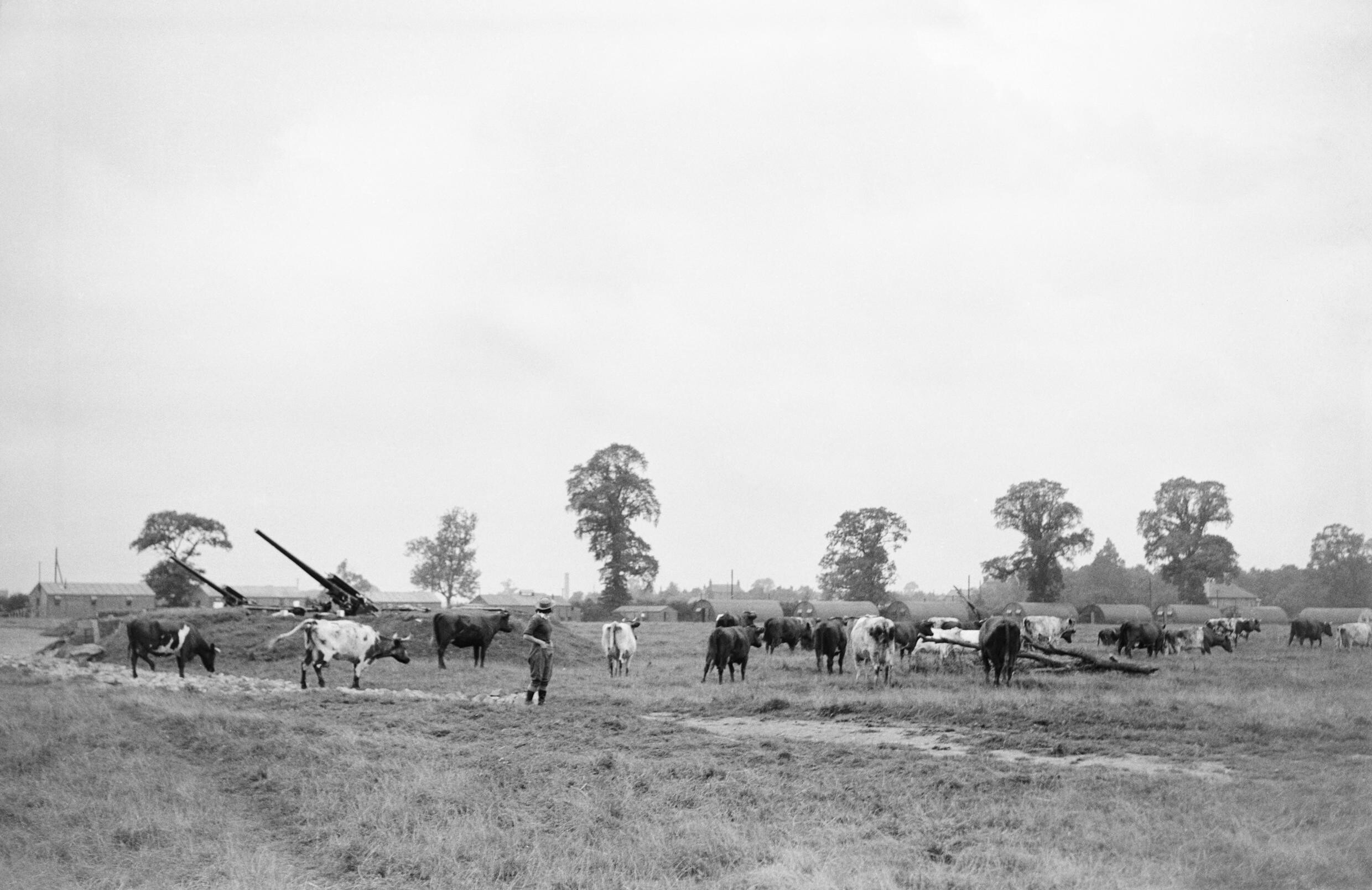
English elm and ack-ack (c. 1941)

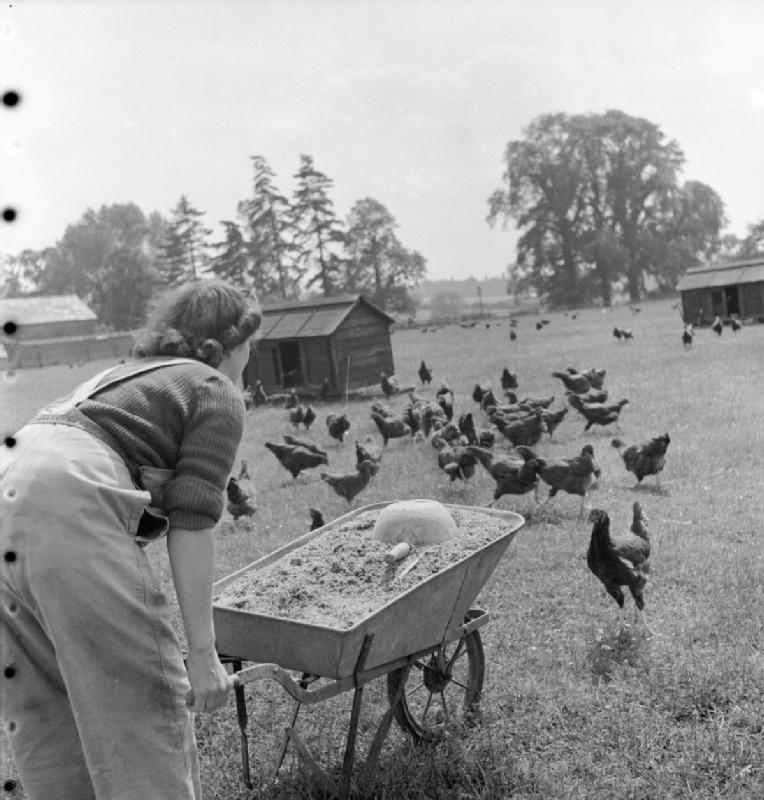
English elms (right), Northamptonshire (1942)

English elm was introduced into Ireland, and as a consequence of Empire has been cultivated in eastern North America and widely in south-eastern Australia and New Zealand. It is still commonly found in Australia and New Zealand, where it is regarded at its best as a street or avenue tree. Some old specimens labelled 'English elm' in Australia, however, have unplated, more vertically furrowed bark and less rounded leaves than common English elm, and appear to be a different clone. English elm was also planted as a street tree on the American West Coast, notably in St Helena, California, and it has been planted in South Africa.

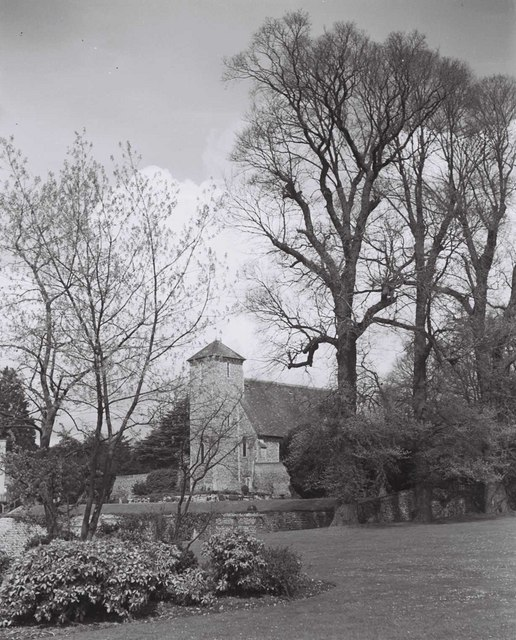
St Peter's Church, Preston Village, Brighton, English elms regrowing after lopping (1951)

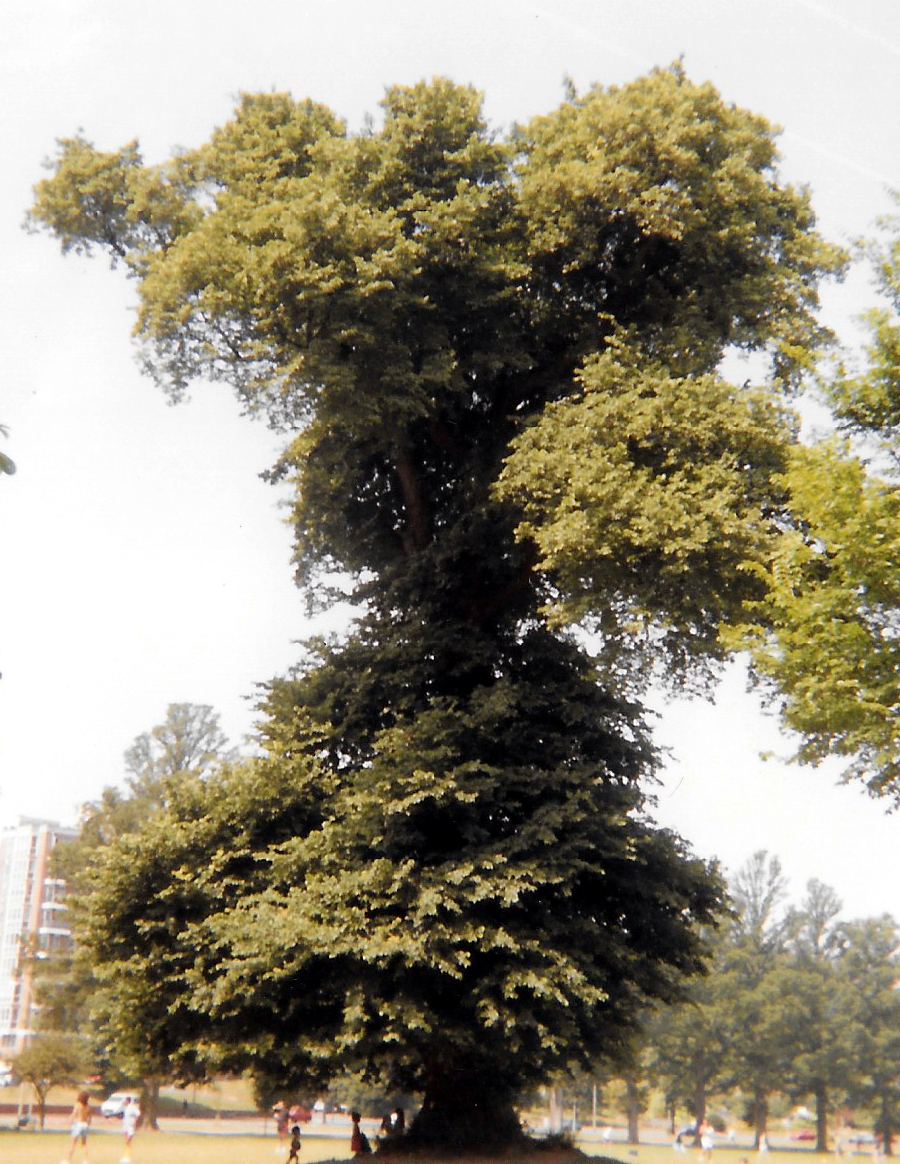
Hourglass-shaped English elm, Preston Park, Brighton (1992)

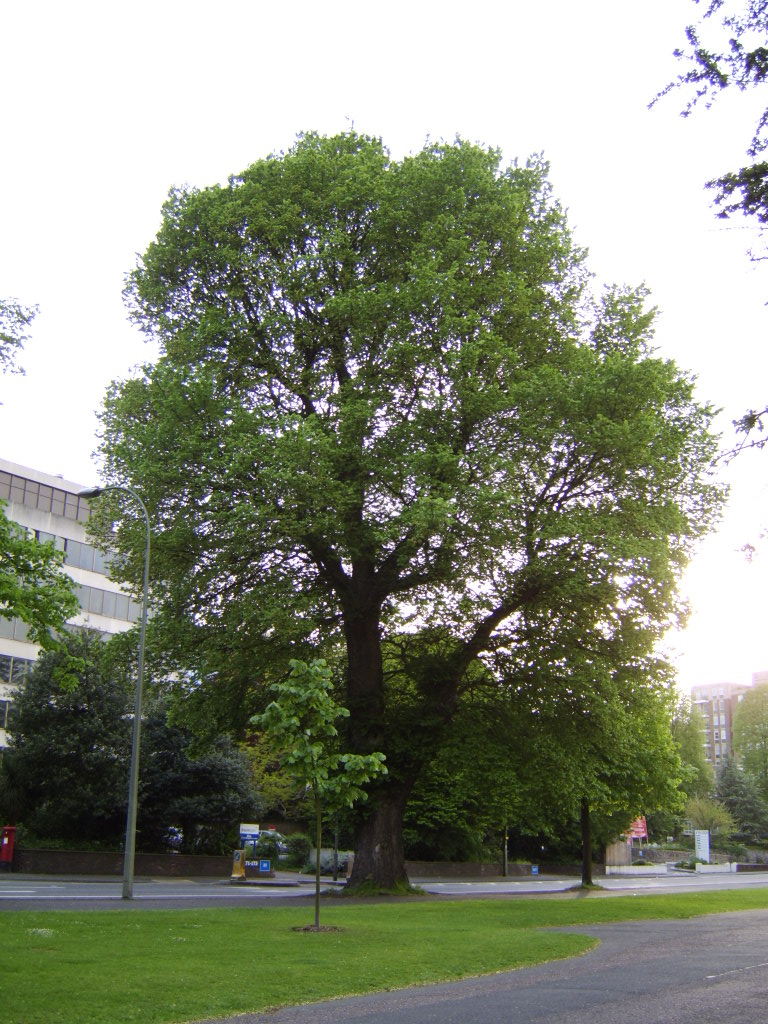
Pruned English elm, Preston Park, Brighton (2004)

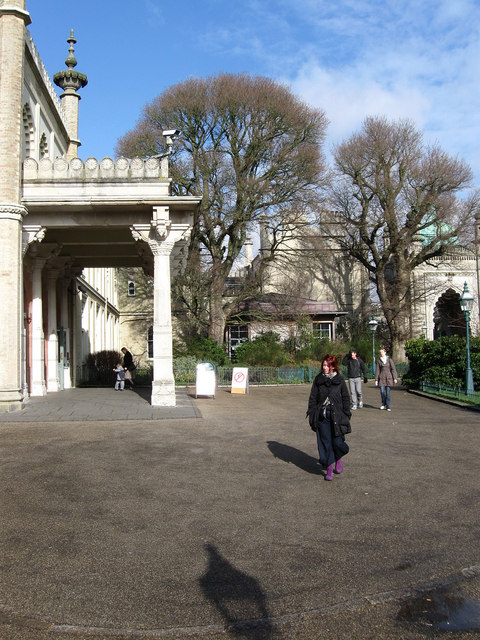
Winter silhouette of trimmed English elm, Brighton (2009)

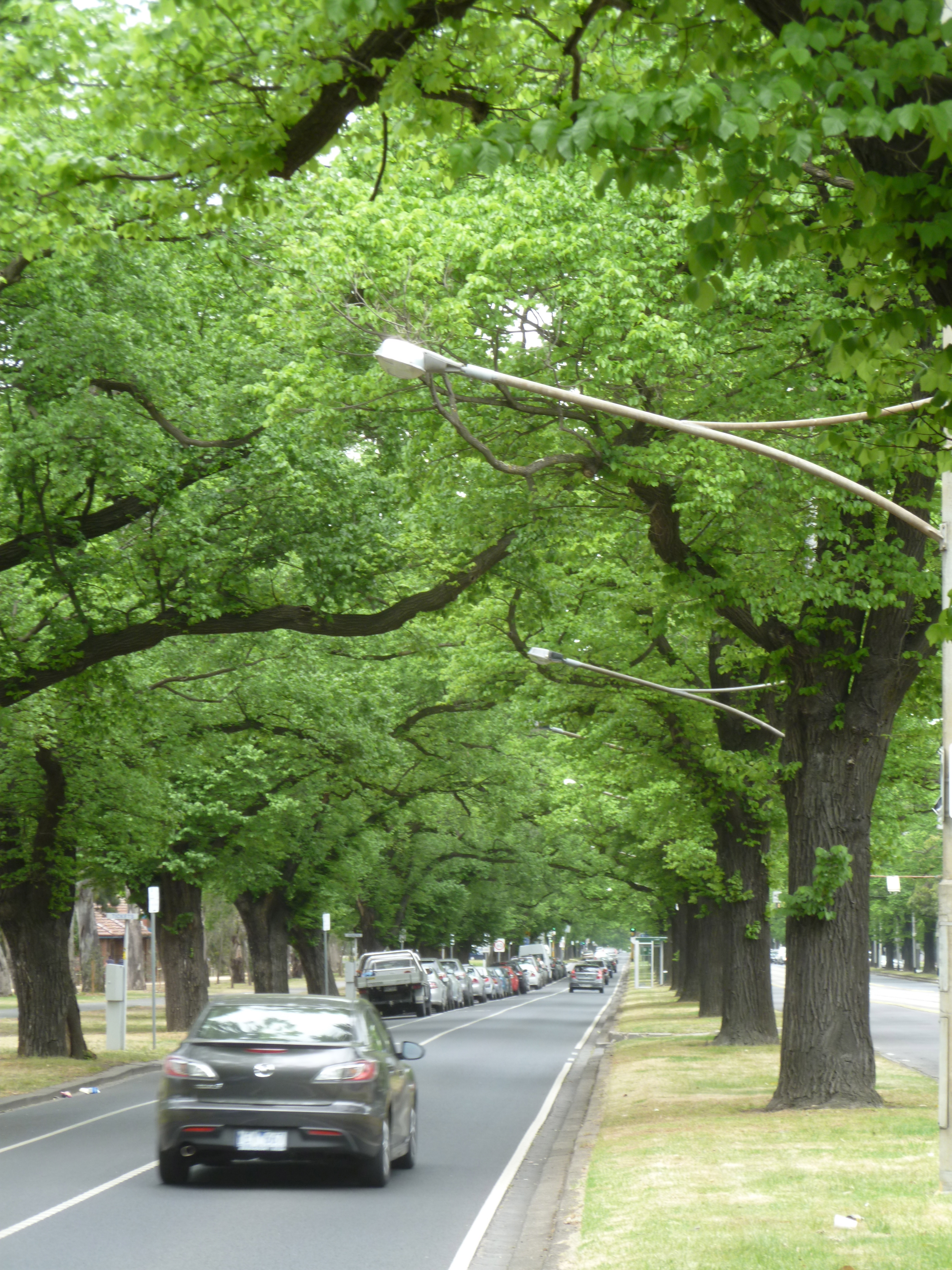
English elms on Royal Parade, Parkville, Melbourne (2012)

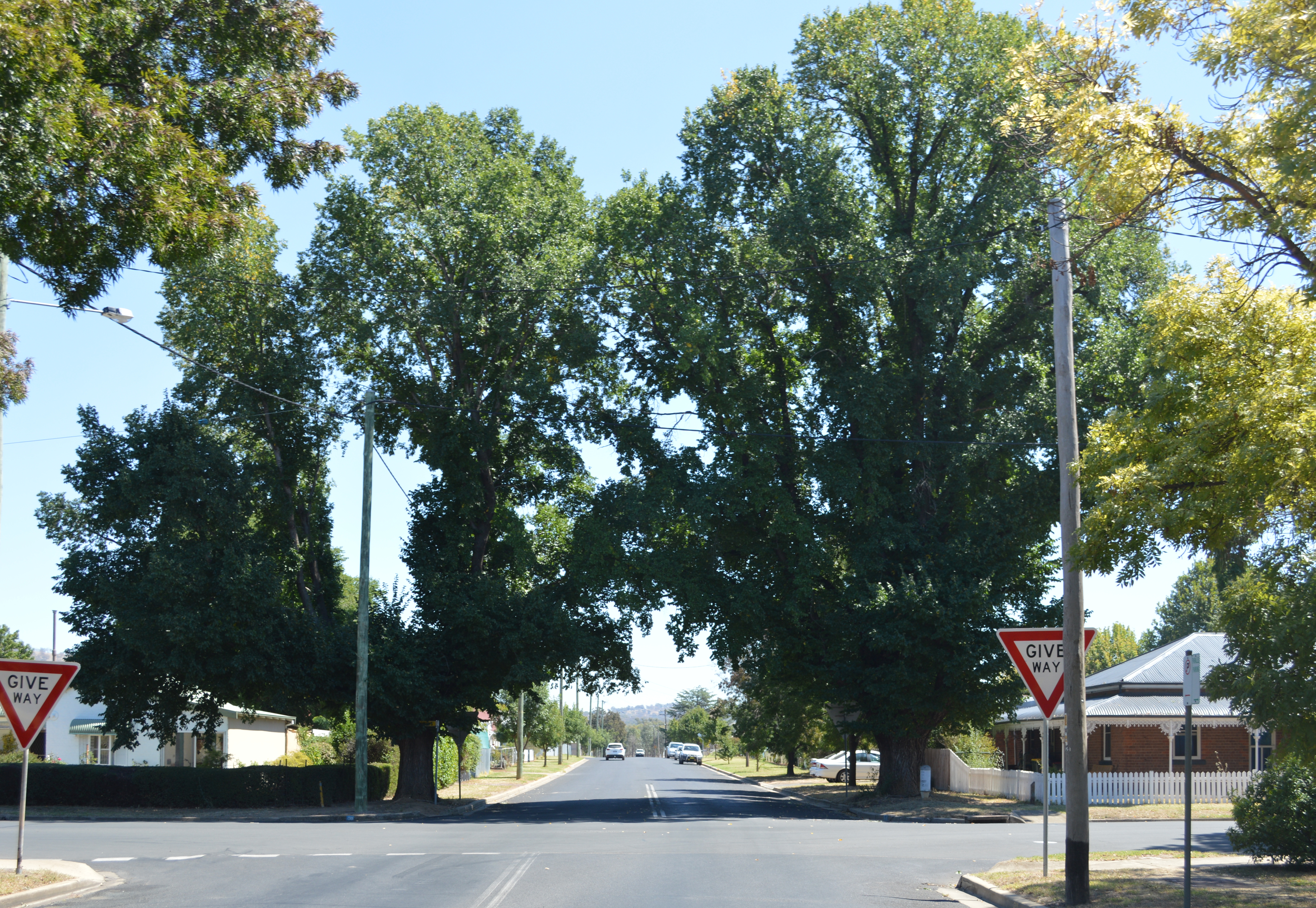
English elms in Cootamundra, New South Wales, one trimmed for power line (2015)

== Notable trees ==
Mature English elms are now only very rarely found in the UK beyond Brighton and Edinburgh. One large tree stands (2025) in Workington, on the north side of Ramsay Brow. Several survive in Edinburgh (2015): one in Rosebank Cemetery (girth 3 m), one in Founders Avenue, Fettes College, and one in Inverleith Park (east avenue), while a majestic open-grown specimen (3 m) in Claremont Park, Leith Links, retains the dense, fan-vaulted crown iconic in this cultivar. An isolated mature English elm is in the cemetery at Dervaig, Isle of Mull, Scotland.

Some of the most significant remaining stands are to be found overseas, notably in Australia, where they line the streets of Melbourne, protected by geography and quarantine from disease. An avenue of 87 English Elms, planted around 1880, lines the entrance to the winery of All Saints Estate, Rutherglen, Victoria; a double avenue of 400 English elms, planted in 1897 and 1910–1915, lines Royal Parade, Parkville, Melbourne. Large free-standing English Elms in Tumut, New South Wales, and Traralgon, Victoria, show the 'un-English' growth-form of the tree in tropical latitudes. However, many of the Australian trees, now over 100 years old, are succumbing to old age, and are being replaced with new trees raised by material from the older trees budded onto Wych Elm Ulmus glabra rootstock. In New Zealand a "massive individual" stands at 36 Mt Albert Road, Auckland. In the United States, several fine trees survive at Boston Common, Boston, and in New York City, notably the Hangman's Elm in Washington Square Park. A large old specimen, the Goshen Elm (bole-girth 236 in.) stands (2021) in Gaithersburg, Maryland. In Canada four 130-year English elms, inoculated against disease, survive on the Back Campus field of the University of Toronto. An English elm planted c. 1872 (girth 5.1 m) stands in Kungsparken, Malmö, Sweden.

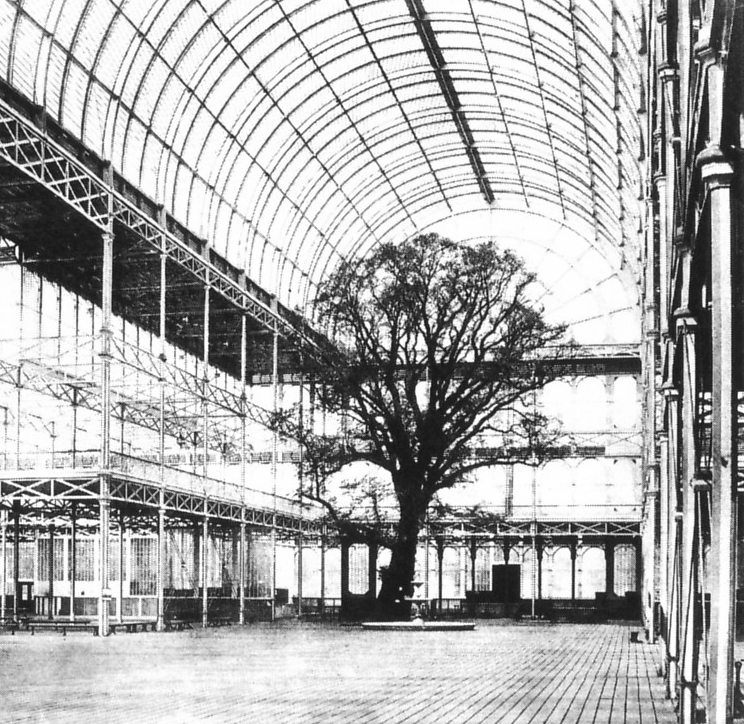
One of three English elms (lower branches removed) around which the Crystal Palace was built for the Great Exhibition, 1851

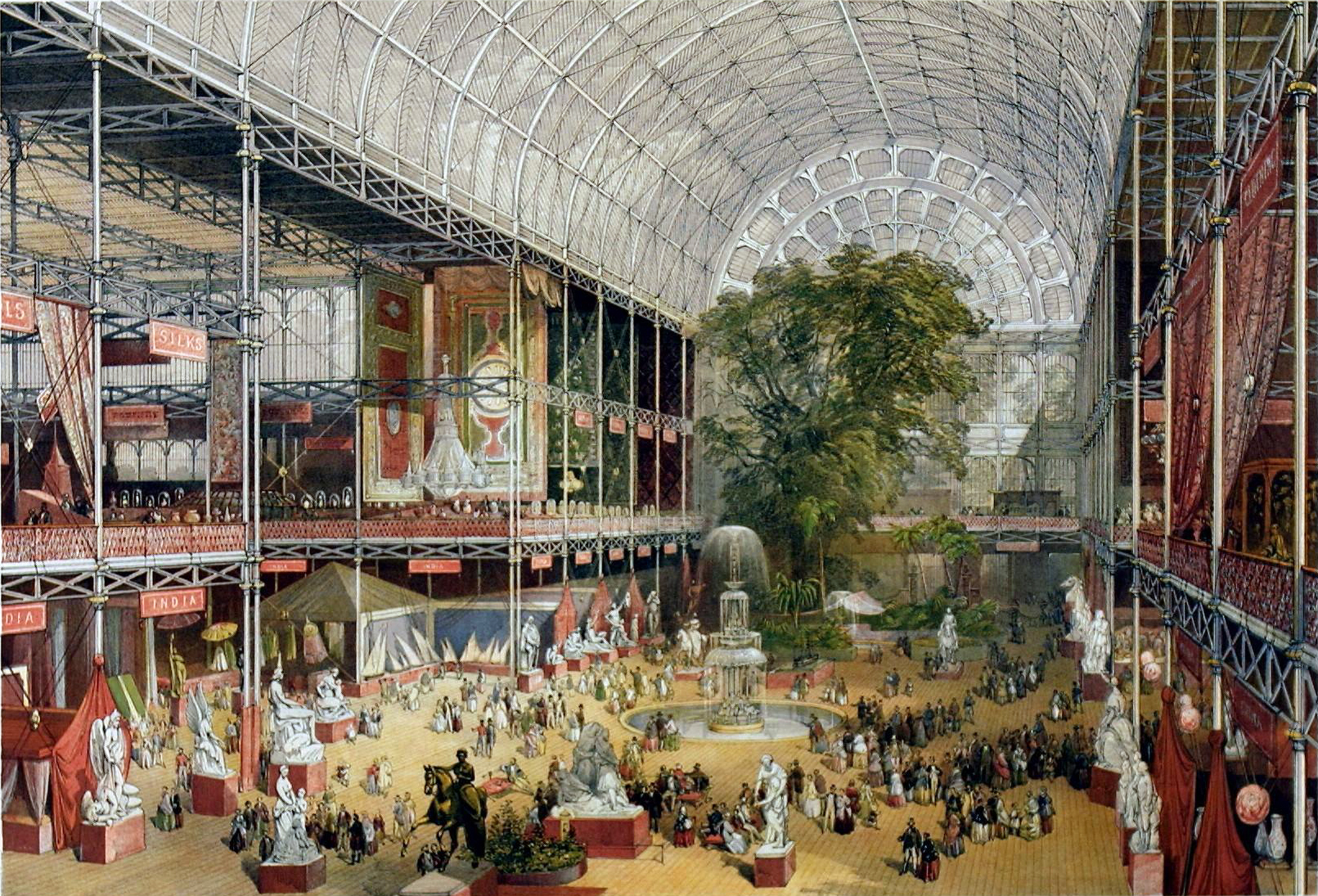
A coloured lithograph of the same tree (1851)

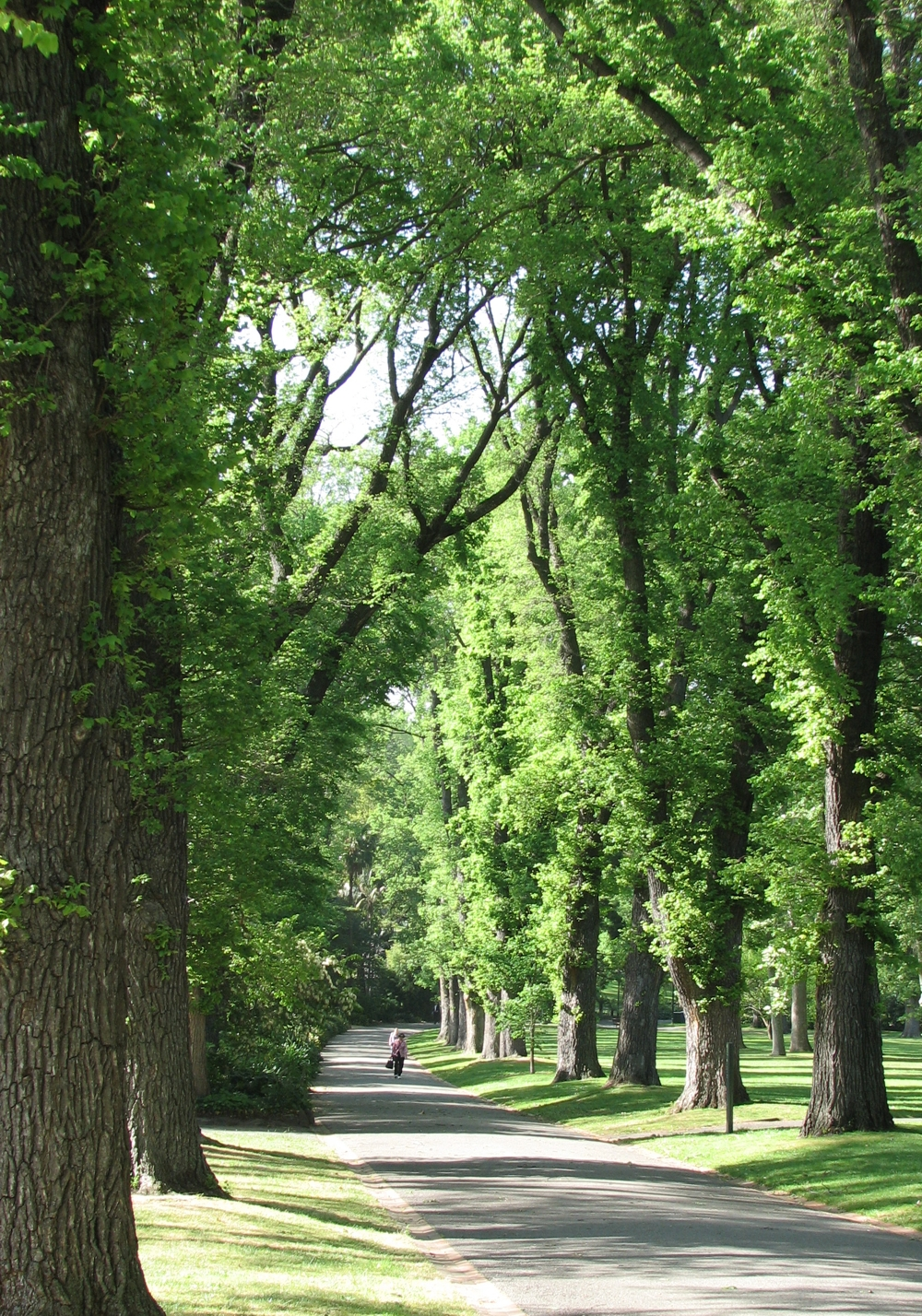
English elm avenue in Fitzroy Gardens, Melbourne (2006)

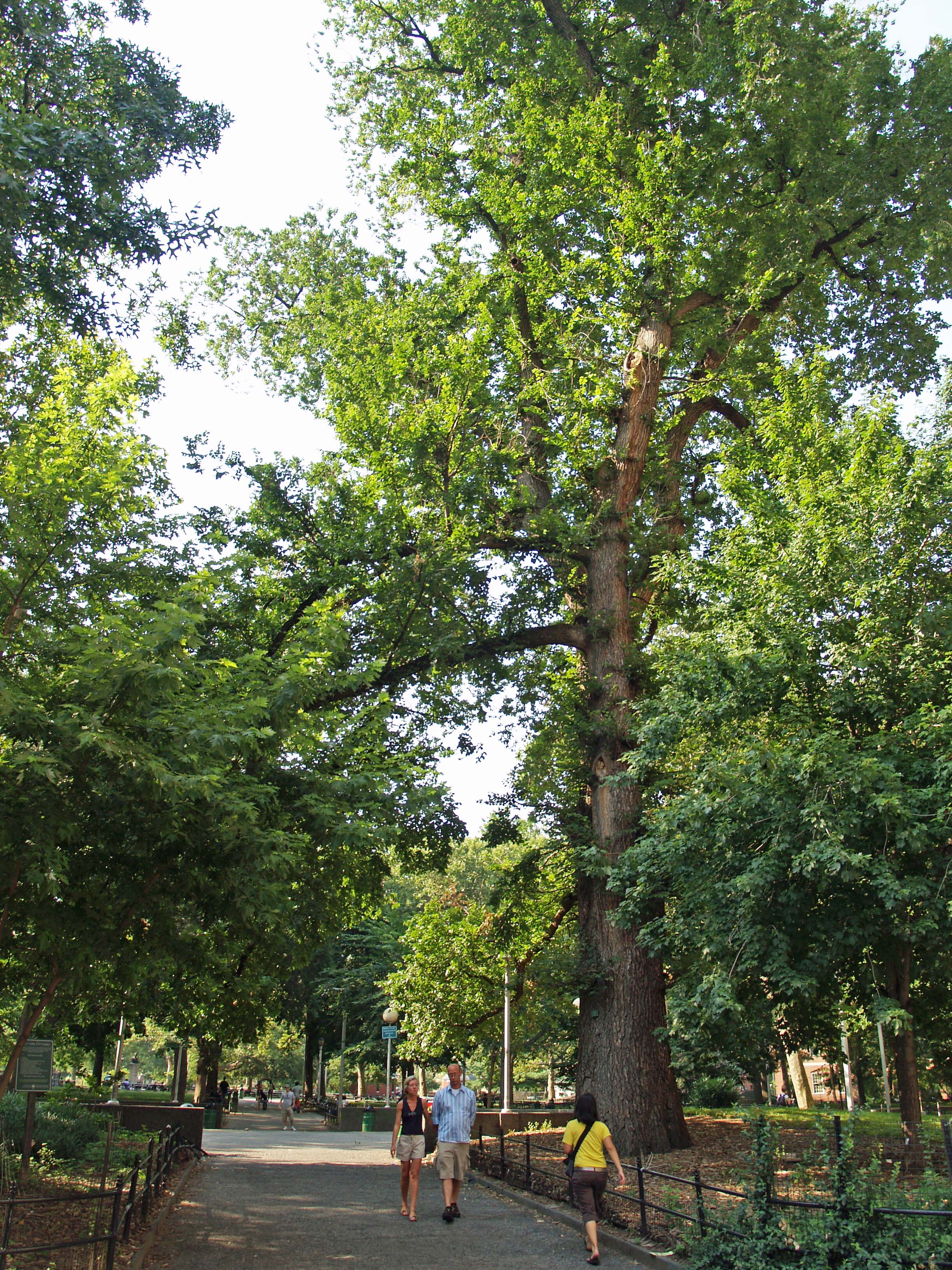
Hangman's Elm, Washington Square Park, New York (2007)

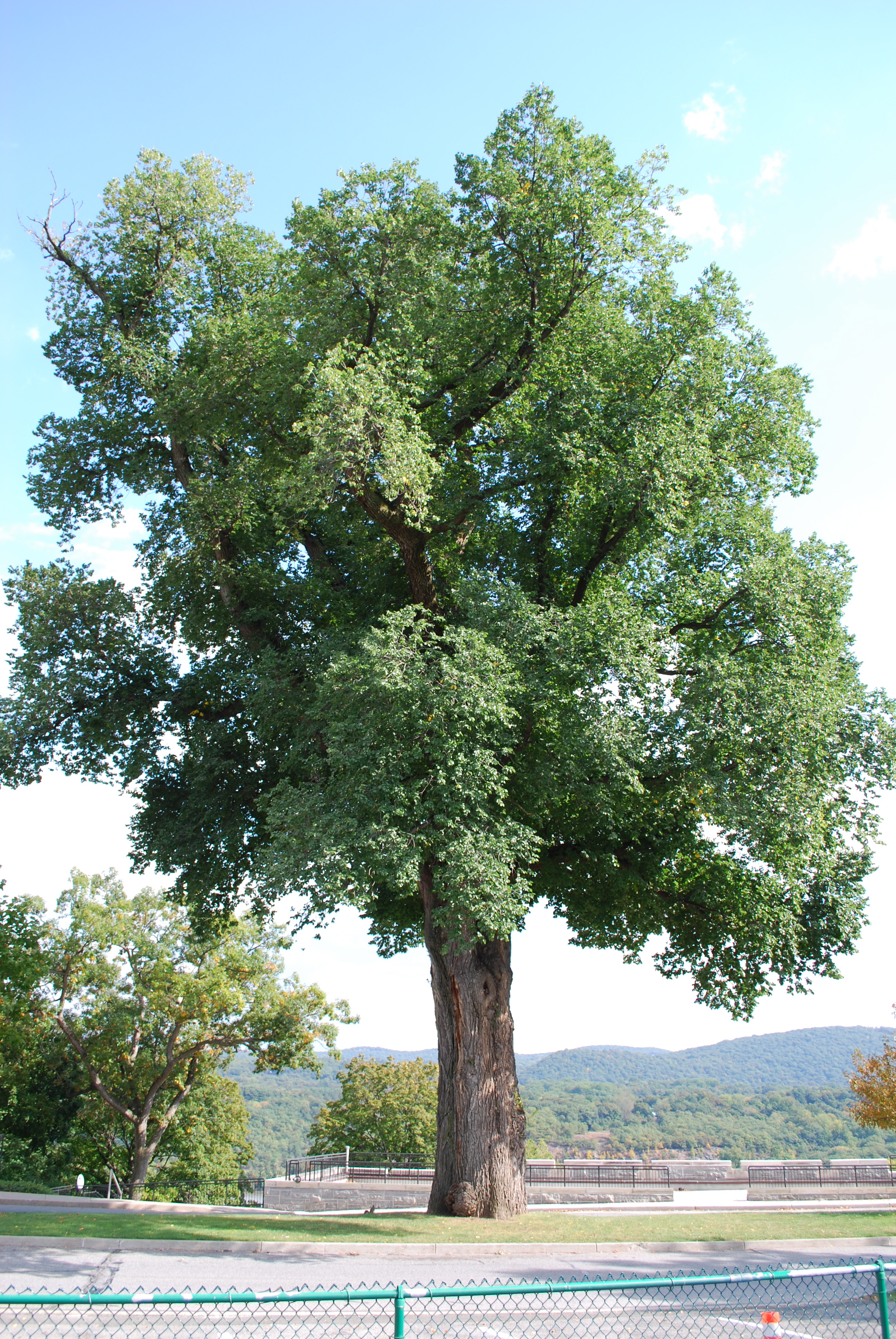
One of two large English elms near Trophy Point at West Point, NY (2009)

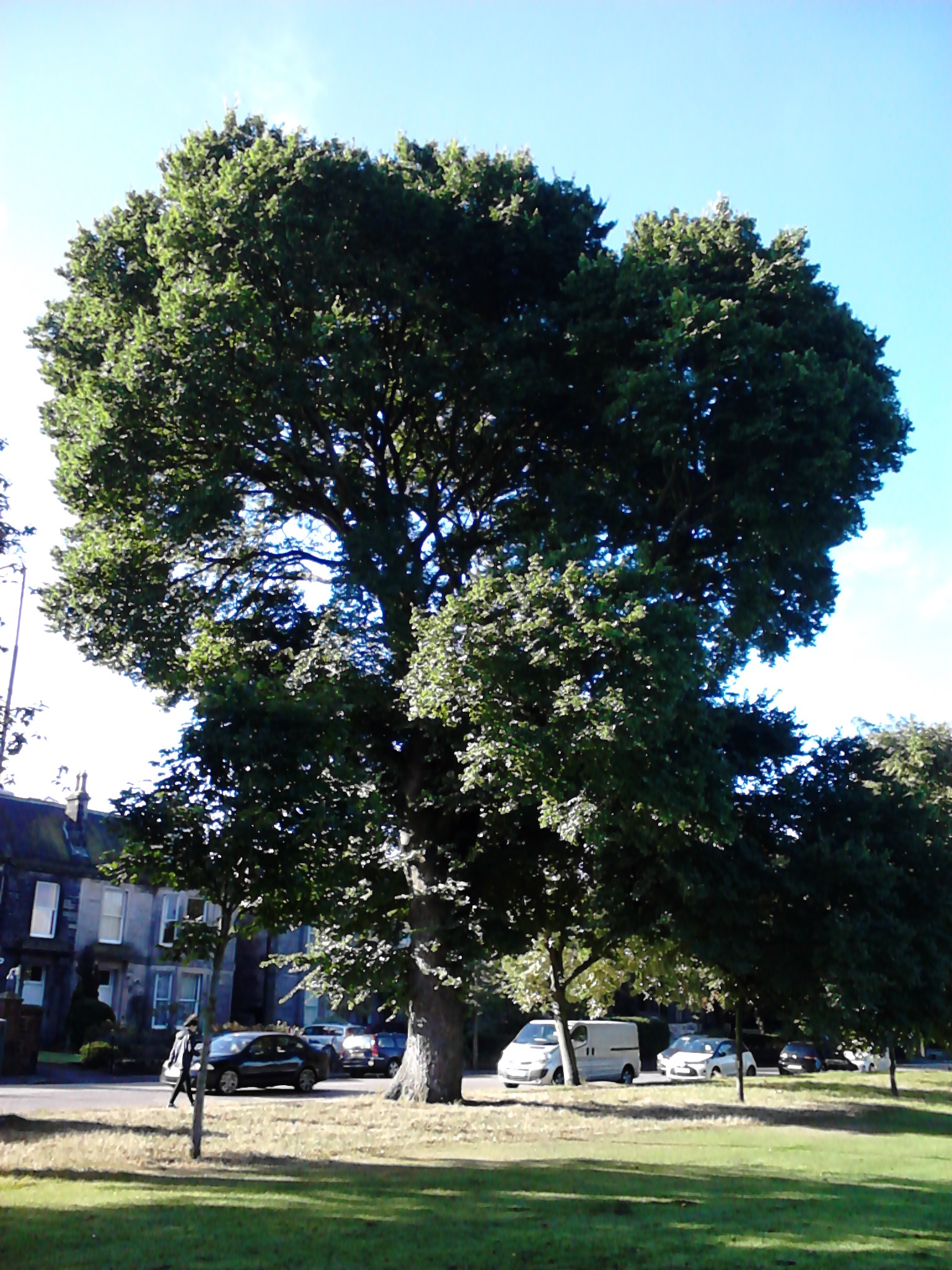
One of the last old English elms in Edinburgh (2016)

=== Brighton and the cordon sanitaire ===
Although the mature English elm population in Britain was almost entirely destroyed by Dutch elm disease, mature trees can still be found along the south coast Dutch Elm Disease Management Area in East Sussex. This cordon sanitaire, aided by the prevailing southwesterly onshore winds and the topographical niche formed by the South Downs, has saved many mature elms. Amongst these were possibly the world's oldest surviving English elms, known as the 'Preston Twins' in Preston Park, both with trunks exceeding 600 cm in circumference (2.0 m dbh), though the larger tree lost two limbs in August 2017 following high winds, and was felled in December 2019 after succumbing to DED.

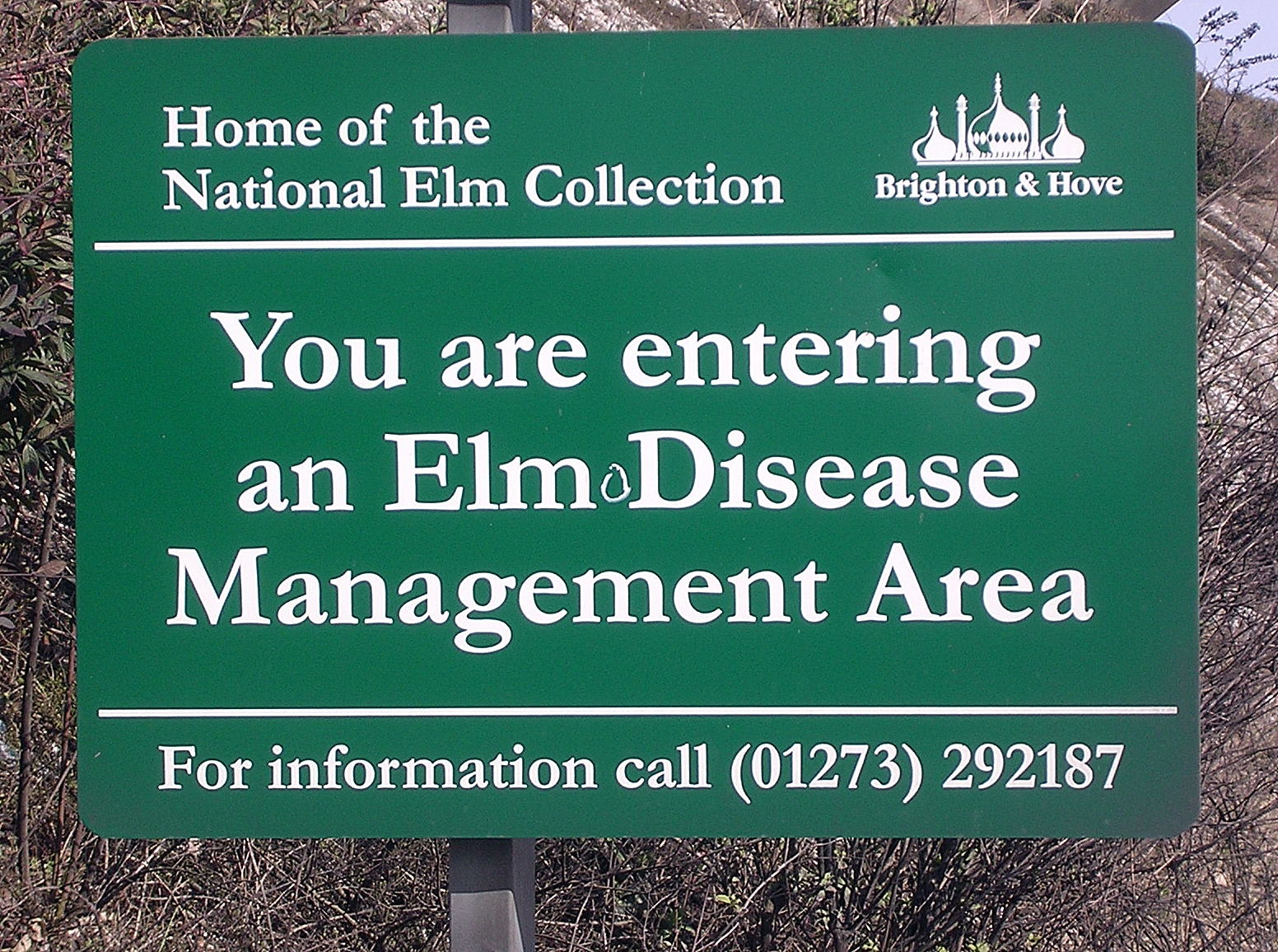
Sign on A27 road, Brighton, England

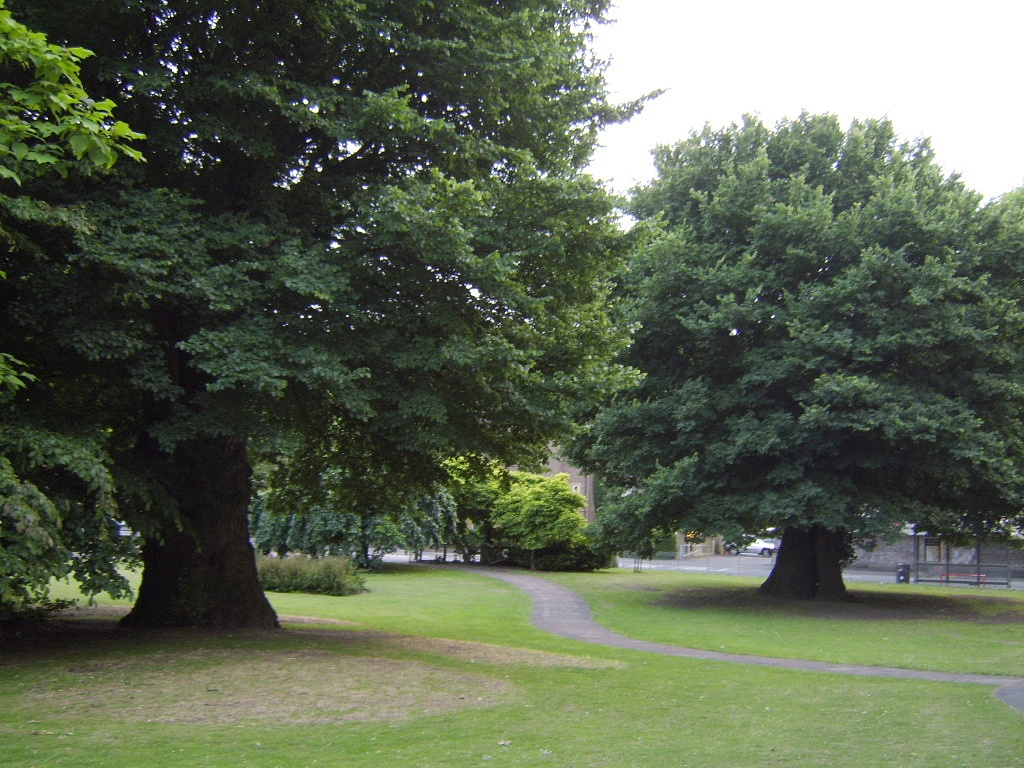
The oldest known English elms in the UK, the 'Preston Twins', Brighton, 2008

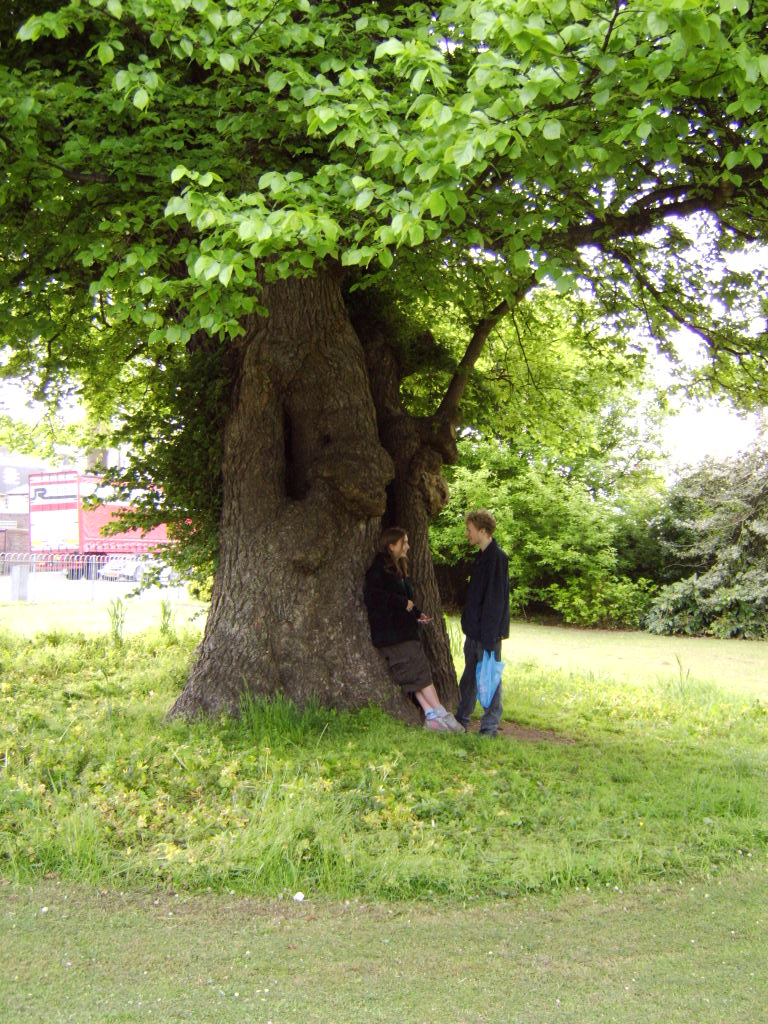
The larger of the twins, 2006

== Cultivars ==
A small number of putative cultivars have been raised since the 18th and early 19th centuries, three of which are now almost certainly lost to cultivation: 'Acutifolia', 'Atinia Pyramidalis', 'Atinia Variegata', 'Folia Aurea', 'Picturata'. Though usually listed as an English Elm cultivar, Ulmus 'Louis van Houtte' "cannot with any certainty be referred to as Ulmus procera [ = 'Atinia'] " (W. J. Bean). In Sweden, U. × hollandica 'Purpurascens', though not a form of English Elm, is known as Ulmus procera 'Purpurea'.

== Hybrids, hybrid cultivars, and mutations ==
Crossability experiments conducted at the Arnold Arboretum in the 1970s apparently succeeded in hybridizing English elm with U. glabra and U. rubra, both also protogynous species. However, the same experiments also showed English elm to be self-compatible, which in the light of its proven female-sterility, must cast doubt on the identity of the specimens used. A similar doubt must hang over Henry's observation that the 'English elms' at Aranjuez (see Cultivation above) "produced every year fertile seed in great abundance", seed said to have been taken "all over Europe", presumably in the hope that it would grow into trees like the royal elms of Spain. Given that English elm is female-sterile, the Aranjuez elms either were not after all English elm, or by the time Henry collected seed from them, English elms there had been replaced by intermediates or by other kinds. At higher altitudes in Spain, Henry noted, such as in Madrid and Toledo, the 'English elm' did not set fertile seed. Melville, however, maintained that English elm was not completely sterile in Britain. "I have, at present," he wrote in 1948, "several seedlings raised from seed hand-picked from trees in 1945. Only when persistent cold weather retards flowering until the beginning of March and continuous mild weather follows, is there much chance of seed maturing."

The 2004 study, which examined "eight individuals classified as English elm" collected in Lazio, Spain, and Britain, noted "slight differences among the Amplified fragment length polymorphism fingerprinting profiles of these eight samples, attributable to somatic mutations". Since 'Atinia', though female infertile, is an efficient producer of pollen and should be capable of acting as a pollen parent; it is compatible with the 2004 findings that in addition to a core population of genetically virtually identical trees deriving from a single clone, intermediate forms of U. minor exist, of which that clone was the pollen parent. These might be popularly or even botanically regarded as 'English elm', though they would be genetically distinct from it, and in these, the female infertility could have gone. The "smooth-leaved form" of English elm mentioned by Richens (1983), and the "northern and Irish form" seen by Oliver Rackham in Edinburgh and Dublin and said by him (1986) to have been introduced to New England, are possible examples of 'Atinia' mutations or intermediates.

Ulmus × hollandica hybrid elms introduced to Australia from England are "commonly and erroneously referred to [in Australia] as 'English Elm' ". Melbourne Botanic Gardens were able to raise seedlings from the "few" viable seeds of what was believed to be a "type" old English Elm in the collection, producing "highly variable" offspring. "This seedling variation," wrote Roger Spencer (Horticultural Flora of South-Eastern Australia, 1995), "suggests one possible source of the variation to be found in these trees [so-called 'English elm' ] in Australia." The extent to which elms in Australia have been propagated by seed rather than by cloning is unclear, but Melville believed that there were Ulmus procera × Ulmus minor hybrids present in Victoria. "Chance hybridisation," wrote Spencer, "has resulted in a mix of elms rather different from that in England". Similarly, an old tree labelled U. procera in Dunedin Botanic Garden, New Zealand (2023), may be an elm from England, but it is not the English elm clone.

== In art and photography ==
The elms in the Suffolk landscape paintings and drawings of John Constable were not English elm, but "most probably East Anglian hybrid elms ... such as still grow in the same hedges" in Dedham Vale and East Bergholt, while his Flatford Mill elms were U. minor. Constable's Study of an elm tree (circa 1821) is, however, thought to depict the bole of an English elm with its bark "cracked into parched-earth patterns". Among artists who depicted English Elms were Edward Seago and James Duffield Harding. English elm features in oil paintings by contemporary artist David Shepherd, either as the main subject (Majestic elms ) or more often as the background to nostalgic evocations of farming scenes.

Among classic photographs of English elm are those by Edward Step and Henry Irving in Wayside and Woodland Trees, A pocket guide to the British sylva (1904).

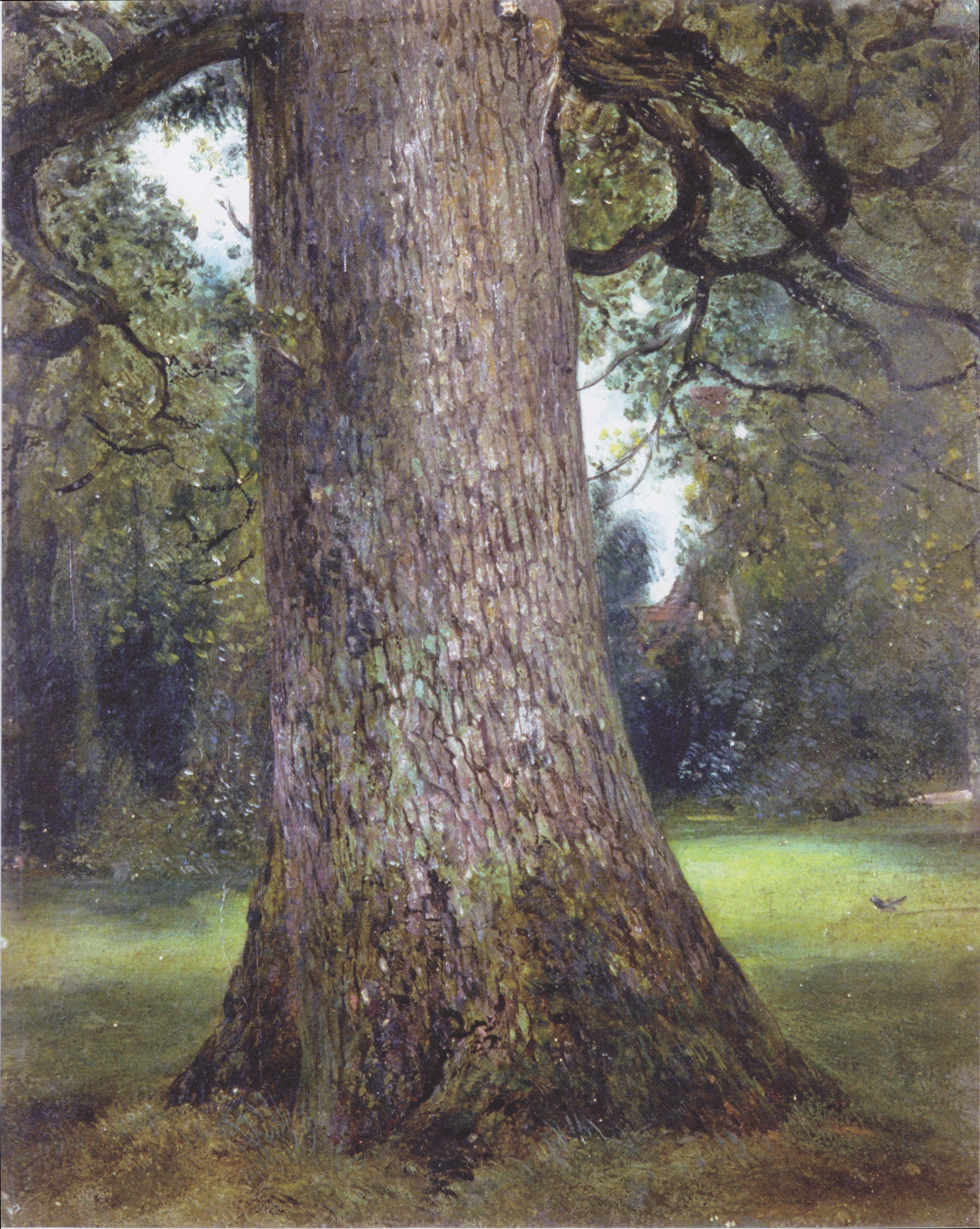
Constable, Study of an elm tree (around 1821)

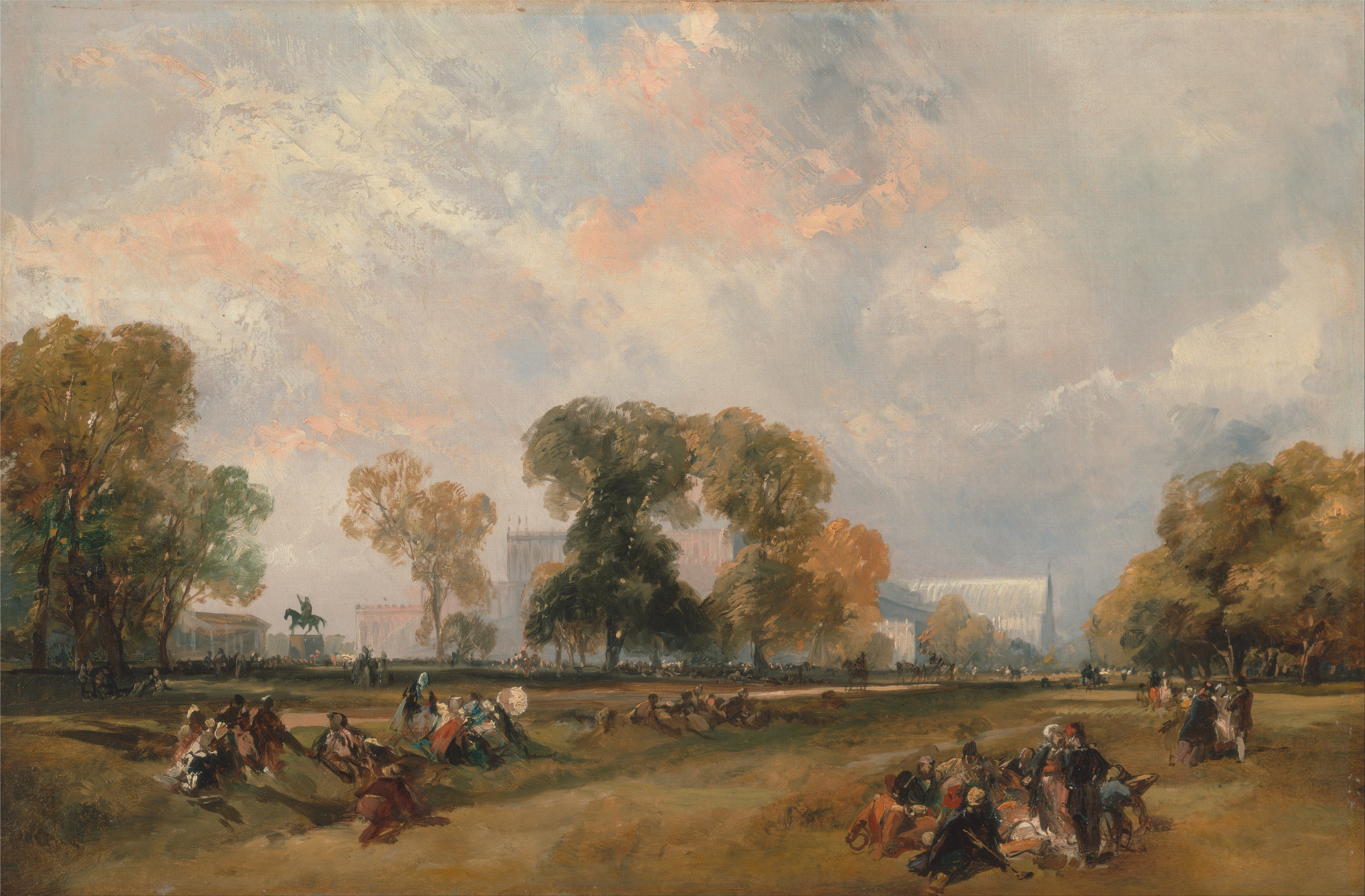
Figure-of-eight-shaped English elms, Hyde Park: James Duffield Harding's The Great Exhibition of 1851

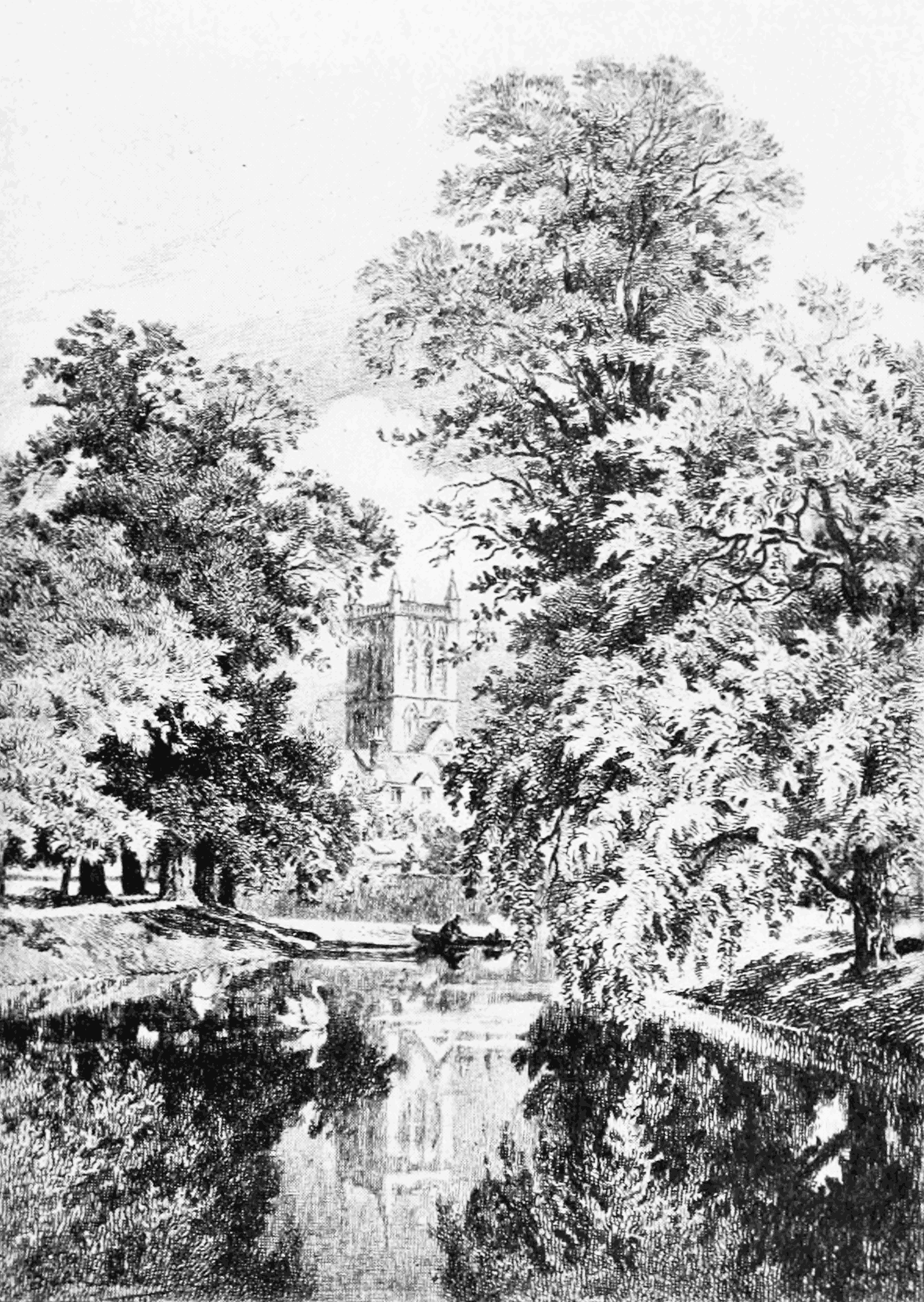
The Cam near Trinity College, Cambridge (unknown artist): a grove of mainly English elms on The Backs

== Accessions ==
=== North America ===
- Longwood Gardens, US. Acc. no. L-2507.
- Morton Arboretum, US. Acc. nos. 211–40, 756–60, 351–70.

=== Europe ===
- Brighton & Hove City Council, UK. NCCPG Elm Collection. UK champion: Preston Park, 15 m high (storm damaged), 201 cm d.b.h. in 2001. Brighton & Hove has some 700 trees; the most notable examples are at Preston Park, South Victoria Gardens, Royal Pavilion Gardens, The Level, Holmes Avenue, University of Sussex Campus; Preston Road (A23) and Hanover Crescent.
- Grange Farm Arboretum, Sutton St James, Spalding, Lincolnshire, UK. Acc. no. 518.
- Royal Botanic Garden Edinburgh, UK. As Ulmus procera. Acc. no. 20081448.
- Royal Botanic Gardens, Kew, UK. Acc. no. not known.
- Strona Arboretum, University of Life Sciences, Warsaw, Poland. No details available.
- University of Copenhagen, Botanic Garden, Denmark. One specimen, no details available.
- Westonbirt Arboretum, Tetbury, Glos., UK. Four trees, listed as U. minor var. vulgaris; no acc. details available.

=== Australasia ===
- Avenue of Honour, Ballarat, Australia. Details not known.
- Eastwoodhill Arboretum, Gisborne, New Zealand. 12 trees, details not known.
- Waite Arboretum, University of Adelaide, Adelaide, Australia. No details available.

== See also ==
- The Elm and the Vine
