= Listed buildings in Hastingleigh =

Historic structures in Kent, England

Hastingleigh is a village and civil parish in the Borough of Ashford of Kent, England. It contains one grade I, one grade II* and 19 grade II listed buildings that are recorded in the National Heritage List for England.

This list is based on the information retrieved online from Historic England.

== Key ==
Grade	Criteria
I	Buildings that are of exceptional interest
II*	Particularly important buildings of more than special interest
II	Buildings that are of special interest

== Listing ==
Name	Grade	Location	Type	Completed (Note: The date given is the date used by Historic England as significant for the initial building or that of an important part in the structure's description.)	Date designated	Grid ref. (Note: The grid reference is based on the British national grid reference system, sometimes known as OSGB36, used by the Ordnance Survey.) Geo-coordinates	Notes	Entry number (Note: The "List Entry Number" is a unique number assigned to each listed building and scheduled monument by Historic England.)	Image	Wikidata
Barn About 10 Metres North East of Court Lodge	II				16 February 1989	TR1022044568; 51°09′42″N 1°00′19″E		1276723	Upload Photo	Q26566217
Barn About 30 Metres North East of Coombe Manor	II				16 February 1989	TR0803146346; 51°10′43″N 0°58′30″E		1233187	Upload Photo	Q26526666
Barn About 50 Metres South East of Coombe Manor	II				27 November 1957	TR0804646285; 51°10′41″N 0°58′30″E		1233186	Upload Photo	Q26526665
Church of St Mary	I				16 February 1989	TR1019744495; 51°09′40″N 1°00′17″E		1232978	Church of St Mary More images	Q17529385
Coombe Manor	II				27 November 1957	TR0799046312; 51°10′42″N 0°58′28″E		1276706	Upload Photo	Q26566201
Court Lodge	II				16 February 1989	TR1020444556; 51°09′42″N 1°00′18″E		1233171	Upload Photo	Q26526652
Headstone to George Legget, About 20 Metres West of Church of St Mary	II	About 20 Metres West Of Church Of St Mary			16 February 1989	TR1017644501; 51°09′40″N 1°00′16″E		1233170	Upload Photo	Q26526651
Headstone to Joseph Holmes About 15 Metres North West of Church of St Mary	II				16 February 1989	TR1018844509; 51°09′40″N 1°00′17″E		1233203	Upload Photo	Q26526682
Hazel Tree Farmhouse	II	Hassell Street			13 July 1989	TR0915846434; 51°10′44″N 0°59′28″E		1221252	Upload Photo	Q26515662
The Woodmans Arms	II	Hassell Street			16 February 1989	TR0897346548; 51°10′48″N 0°59′19″E		1276714	Upload Photo	Q26566209
Kingsmill Down Farmhouse and Horsewheel Adjacent	II	Kingsmill Down			16 February 1989	TR1053043974; 51°09′23″N 1°00′33″E		1233189	Upload Photo	Q26526668
Lyddendale House	II	Lyddendale Road			16 February 1989	TR0988645441; 51°10′11″N 1°00′03″E		1233243	Upload Photo	Q26526722
Barn About 20 Metres North of the Old Rectory	II	Tamley Lane			16 February 1989	TR0956044051; 51°09′26″N 0°59′44″E		1276737	Upload Photo	Q26566228
Crabtree Farmhouse	II	Tamley Lane			16 February 1989	TR0951744609; 51°09′44″N 0°59′43″E		1233198	Upload Photo	Q26526677
South Hill and Wall and Steps Attached	II*	Tamley Lane			27 November 1957	TR0960743995; 51°09′24″N 0°59′46″E		1276735	Upload Photo	Q17556841
The Old Rectory	II	Tamley Lane			16 February 1989	TR0954844021; 51°09′25″N 0°59′43″E		1233197	Upload Photo	Q26526676
Wall About 25 to 50 Metres South West of South Hill	II	Tamley Lane			16 February 1989	TR0959444001; 51°09′25″N 0°59′45″E		1276736	Upload Photo	Q26566227
Old Coachhouse About 7 Feet to the East of the Bowl Inn	II	The Street			27 November 1957	TR0958544905; 51°09′54″N 0°59′47″E		1233267	Upload Photo	Q26526746
South View	II	The Street			16 February 1989	TR0969244927; 51°09′55″N 0°59′52″E		1233265	Upload Photo	Q26526744
The Bowl Inn	II	The Street			16 February 1989	TR0957744911; 51°09′54″N 0°59′46″E		1233193	Upload Photo	Q26526672
Vigo Farmhouse	II	The Street			16 February 1989	TR0937444962; 51°09′56″N 0°59′36″E		1233192	Upload Photo	Q26526671

== See also ==
- Grade I listed buildings in Kent
- Grade II* listed buildings in Kent

== Sources ==
- Newman, John (2012) [1969], Kent: West and the Weald, The Buildings of England, New Haven and London: Yale University Press, ISBN 978-0-300-18509-6
