= Listed buildings in Waltham, Kent =

Civil Parish in Kent, England

Waltham is a village and civil parish in the City of Canterbury district of Kent, England. It contains 22 listed buildings that are recorded in the National Heritage List for England. Of these one is grade I, one is grade II* and 20 are grade II.

This list is based on the information retrieved online from Historic England.

== Key ==
Grade	Criteria
I	Buildings that are of exceptional interest
II*	Particularly important buildings of more than special interest
II	Buildings that are of special interest

== Listing ==
Name	Grade	Location	Type	Completed (Note: The date given is the date used by Historic England as significant for the initial building or that of an important part in the structure's description.)	Date designated	Grid ref. (Note: The grid reference is based on the British national grid reference system, sometimes known as OSGB36, used by the Ordnance Survey.) Geo-coordinates	Notes	Entry number (Note: The "List Entry Number" is a unique number assigned to each listed building and scheduled monument by Historic England.)	Image	Wikidata
Anvil Green Farmhouse	II	Anvil Green			14 March 1980	TR1072849479; 51°12′20″N 1°00′55″E		1336580	Upload Photo	Q26621062
Handville Green	II*	Anvil Green			14 March 1980	TR1089849622; 51°12′25″N 1°01′04″E		1085517	Upload Photo	Q17557051
Temple Field	II	Anvil Green			14 March 1980	TR1050049425; 51°12′19″N 1°00′43″E		1045810	Upload Photo	Q26297914
The Cottage	II	Anvil Green			14 March 1980	TR1081949535; 51°12′22″N 1°01′00″E		1054923	Upload Photo	Q26306569
Church of St Bartholomew	I	Church Lane	church building		30 January 1967	TR1127248449; 51°11′46″N 1°01′21″E		1367044	Church of St Bartholomew More images	Q17529650
Little London	II	Church Lane, Little London			14 March 1980	TR1179148174; 51°11′37″N 1°01′47″E		1085518	Upload Photo	Q26372957
The Chantry	II	Church Lane			14 March 1980	TR1121548515; 51°11′48″N 1°01′18″E		1336581	Upload Photo	Q26621063
Yew Tree Cottage	II	Church Lane			14 March 1980	TR1182748036; 51°11′32″N 1°01′49″E		1336601	Upload Photo	Q26621084
Yockletts Farmhouse	II	Church Lane, Yockletts Farm			14 March 1980	TR1209847736; 51°11′22″N 1°02′02″E		1085476	Upload Photo	Q26372761
Ansdore Farmhouse	II	Duckpit Road, Ansdore Farm			14 March 1980	TR1186848953; 51°12′02″N 1°01′53″E		1085477	Upload Photo	Q26372766
Upper Ansdore	II	Duckpit Road, Ansdore			14 March 1980	TR1166948906; 51°12′01″N 1°01′42″E		1336602	Upload Photo	Q26621085
Cobwebs	II	Kake Street			14 March 1980	TR1090348722; 51°11′56″N 1°01′03″E		1336604	Upload Photo	Q26621087
Dennes House	II	Kake Street			14 March 1980	TR1090448817; 51°11′59″N 1°01′03″E		1336603	Upload Photo	Q26621086
Kake Cottage	II	Kake Street			14 March 1980	TR1089148748; 51°11′56″N 1°01′02″E		1085480	Upload Photo	Q26372783
Sarness Farmhouse	II	Kake Street, Sarness Farm			30 January 1967	TR1101248978; 51°12′04″N 1°01′09″E		1085478	Upload Photo	Q26372771
Well House	II	Kake Street			30 January 1967	TR1092748889; 51°12′01″N 1°01′04″E		1085479	Upload Photo	Q26372777
Podlinge	II	Podlinge			14 March 1980	TR1123846726; 51°10′51″N 1°01′16″E		1336579	Upload Photo	Q26621061
Sheepcourt Farmhouse	II	Sheepcourt Farm			14 March 1980	TR1199147020; 51°10′59″N 1°01′55″E		1370055	Upload Photo	Q26651315
Waltham Court	II	Waltham Court			14 March 1980	TR1133649868; 51°12′32″N 1°01′27″E		1085515	Upload Photo	Q26372945
Barn at Whiteacre Farm	II	Whiteacre Lane			7 April 1989	TR1115647954; 51°11′30″N 1°01′14″E		1085439	Upload Photo	Q26372565
Ashenfield Farmhouse	II	Woods Hill, Ashenfield Farm			30 January 1967	TR0944047140; 51°11′06″N 0°59′44″E		1085481	Upload Photo	Q26372788
Walnut Tree Farmhouse	II	Woods Hill, Walnut Tree Farm			14 March 1980	TR1055648561; 51°11′51″N 1°00′44″E		1078211	Upload Photo	Q26347457

== See also ==
- Grade I listed buildings in Kent
- Grade II* listed buildings in Kent

== Sources ==
- Newman, John (2013) [1969], Kent: North-East and East, The Buildings of England, New Haven and London: Yale University Press, ISBN 978-0-300-18506-5
