= Hangman's Elm =

English elm tree in Manhattan, New York

Coordinates: 40°43′55″N 73°59′55″W

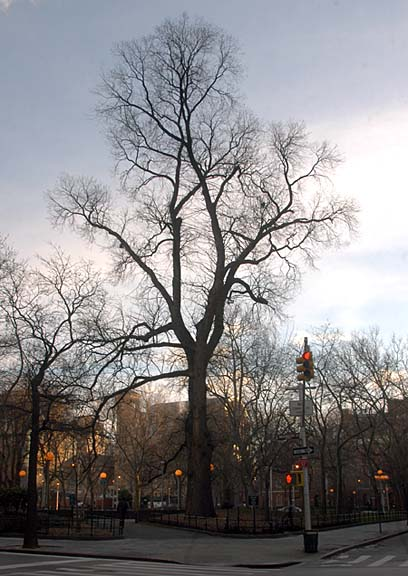
Hangman's Elm

Hangman's Elm, or simply "The Hanging Tree", is an English elm located at the northwest corner in Washington Square Park in Greenwich Village, Manhattan, New York City. It stood at 135 feet (41 m) tall when measured c. 2000, and has a diameter of 67 inches (1.7 m).

In 1989, the New York City Department of Parks and Recreation determined that this English elm was 310 years old, although that was subsequently revised to "more than 300 years old". As a result, it is considered to be Manhattan's oldest, outliving Peter Stuyvesant's pear tree at the northeast corner of 13th Street and Third Avenue, and the great Tulip poplar at Shorakapkok in Manhattan's Inwood neighborhood. It is considered a witness tree with respect to the Revolutionary War.

The earliest references to the elm as a "hanging tree" date from the late 19th century, long after the supposed hangings were said to have taken place. Recent extensive research into the park's history by both an archaeologist and a historian has shown that the tree was on a private farm until the land was bought by the city and added to Washington Square in 1827. No public records exist of hangings from this tree.

The only recorded execution in this area was of Rose Butler, in 1820, for arson. She was hanged from a gallows in the city's potter's field, on the eastern side of Minetta Creek, about 500 feet (150 meters) from the elm; at that time, Minetta Creek ran in a shallow ravine between the potter's field and the farm where the elm stood.

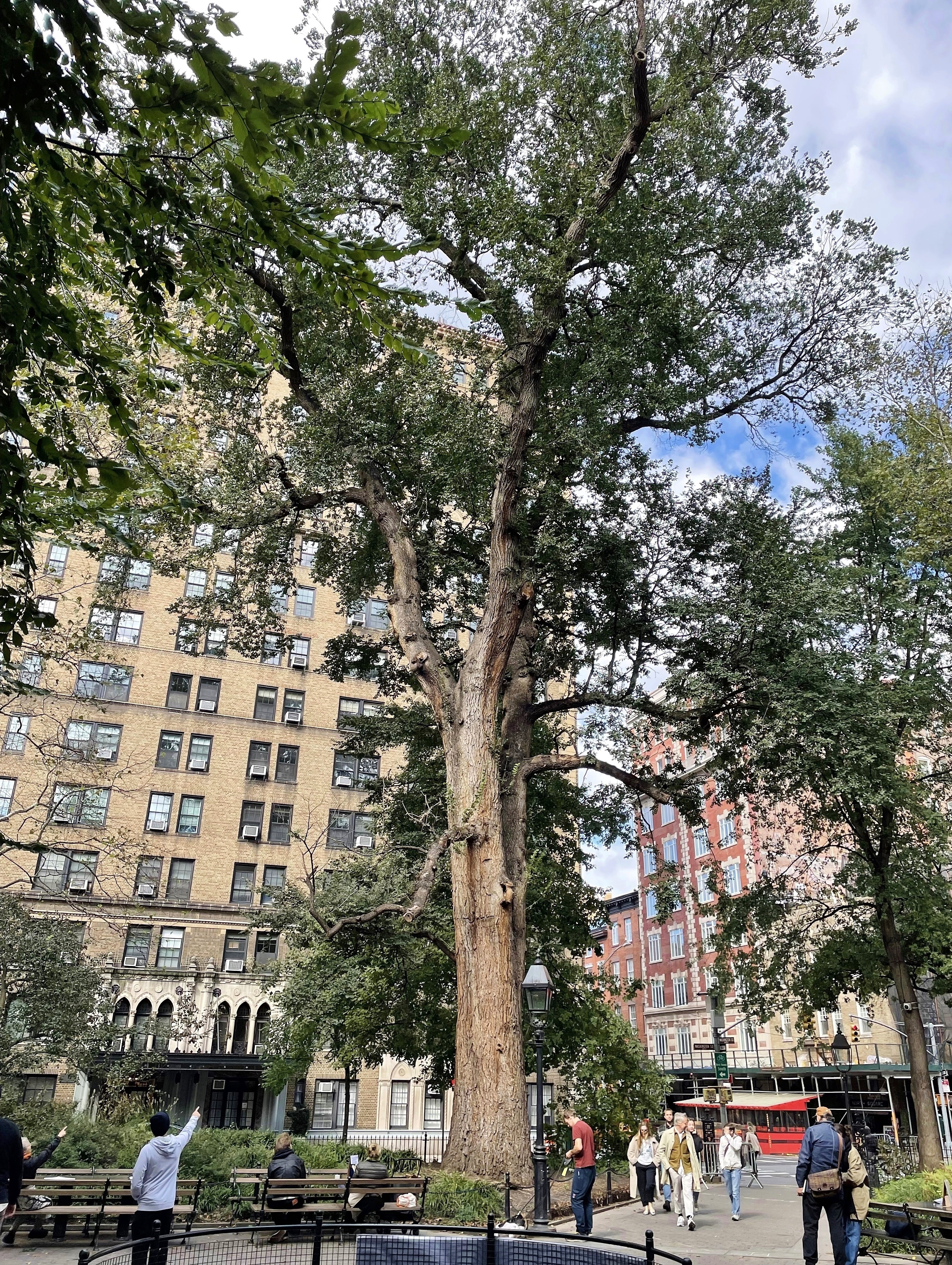
Hangman's Elm in October 2023

== See also ==
- List of hanging trees
- List of individual trees
- Dule tree
- Gibbeting
