= Hastingleigh =

Civil parish in Kent, England

Coordinates: 51.1647°N 1.0003°E

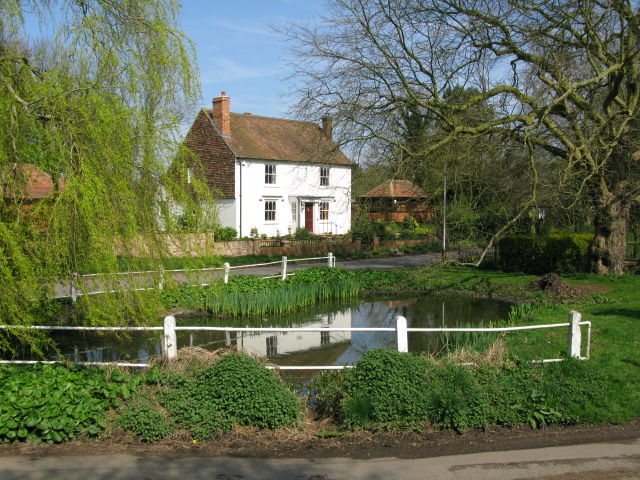
- Village pond

- Location within Kent
- Area: 6.33 km^{2} (2.44 sq mi)
- Population: 230 (Civil Parish 2011)
  - Density: 36/km^{2} (93/sq mi)
- OS grid reference: TR097449
- Civil parish: Hastingleigh
- District: Ashford
- Shire county: Kent
- Region: South East
- Country: England
- Sovereign state: United Kingdom
- Post town: Ashford
- Postcode district: TN25
- Dialling code: 01233
- Police: Kent
- Fire: Kent
- Ambulance: South East Coast
- UK Parliament: Ashford

Hastingleigh is a small civil parish centred on an escarpment of the Kent Downs.

The parish is three miles east of Wye and ten miles south of Canterbury, extending to the hill-scape of the Devil's Kneading Trough, on the North Downs Way with views towards Ashford, Romney Marsh and the patchy remnant forest of The Weald (between the Greensand Ridge and South Downs).

== Amenities ==
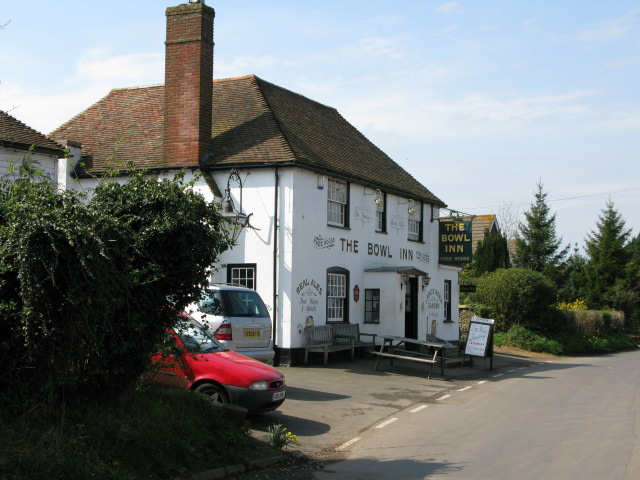
The Bowl Inn

Common amenities are a garage and a public house.

== History ==
Hastingleigh gets its name from the Haestingas, a Jutish tribe that lived in the area.

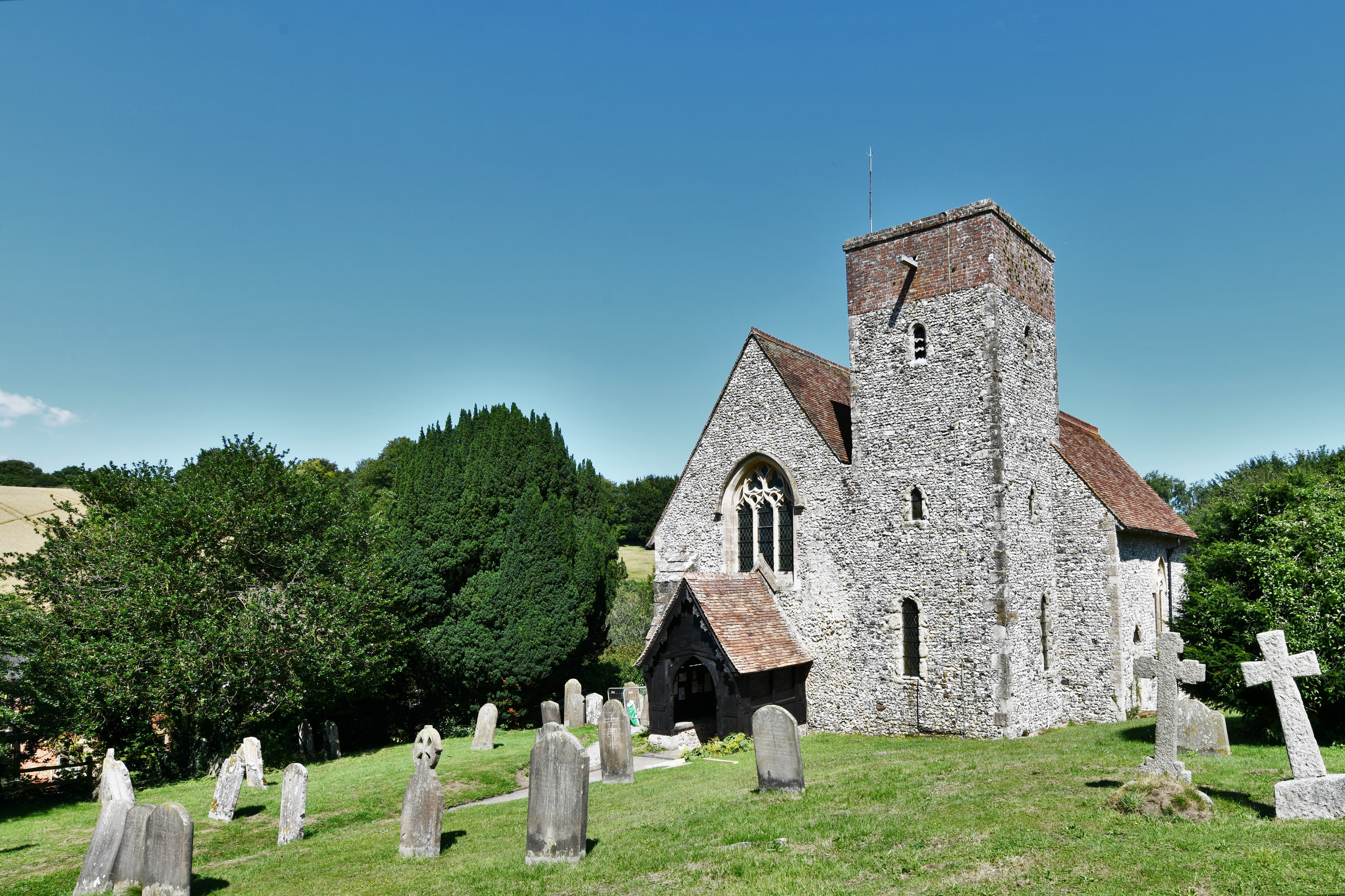
St Mary's Church

The village was in existence before the Domesday Book of 1086, and originally lay in the valley by the Church of England church (St. Mary the Virgin) but following the plague, the main settlement was relocated to its current position. The church is made of stone, in the Early English style, and has a tower containing one bell: there is a brass to John Halke, d.1604, and Amia his wife, d.1596: The maternal grandparents of Dr William Harvey, who discovered the Circulation of the blood, had links to the village; his mother Joane was born at South Hill, Hastingleigh and married Thomas Harvie of Folkestone, in Hastingleigh Church. The nave and aisle were restored in 1880 and the chancel in 1886: the church affords 200 sittings. 12th-century murals were partially uncovered on the north wall, and south east corner of the church in 1966.

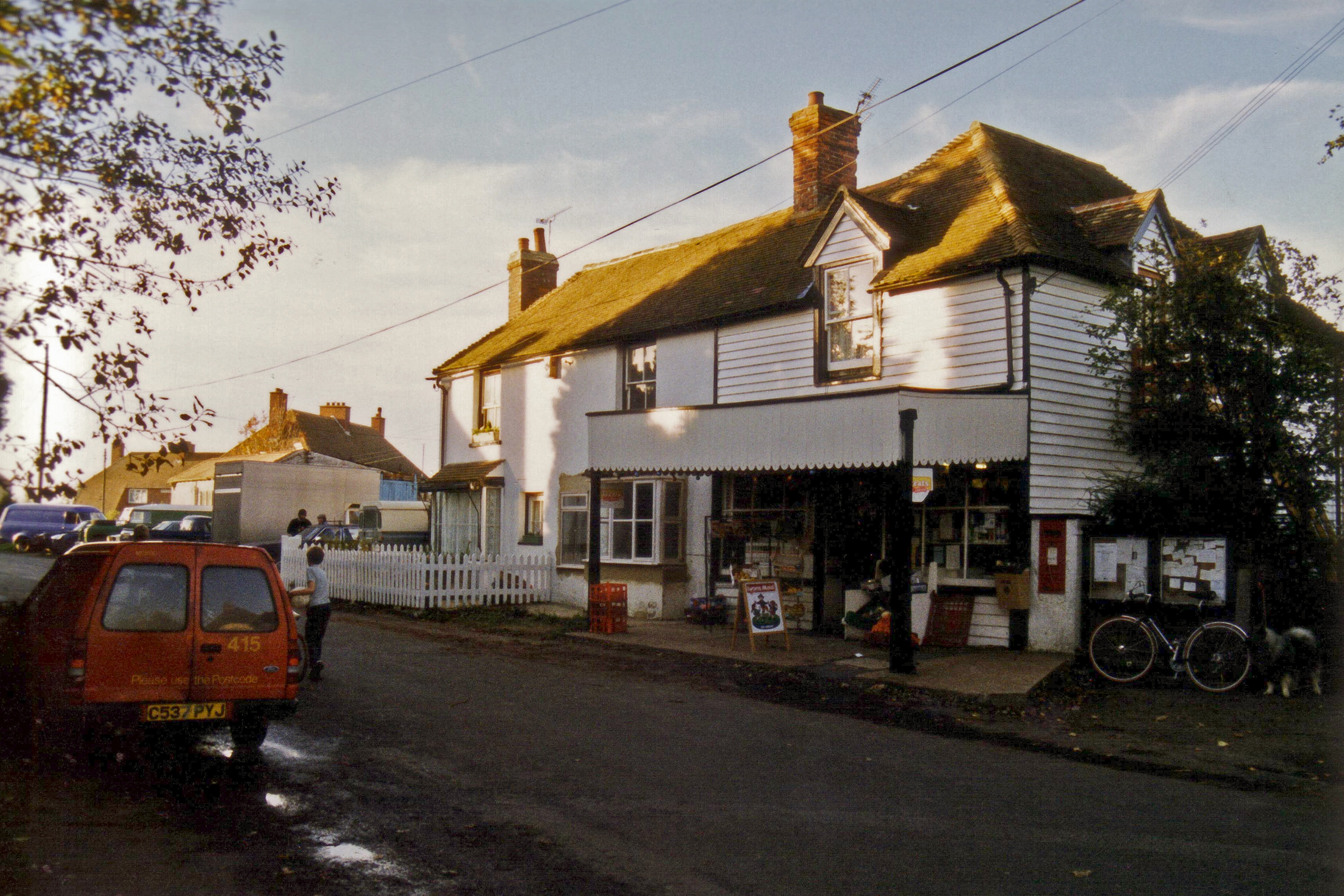
Shop (1986)

Hastingleigh was late in receiving a broadband service, in late 2006. It held most requests status for six months before conversion.

== Transport ==
The village is reached from west or east. The main route (Churchfield Way) through more populated but larger Wye in the west connects, after a short section then a steep descent outside of the civil parish borders, to Elmsted and then to Canterbury.

Bus 620 runs between Canterbury, Hastingleigh and Waltham.

== See also ==
- Listed buildings in Hastingleigh
