= Rose Butler =

American arsonist

Rose Butler (November 1799 – July 9, 1819 (age 20)) was an enslaved domestic worker in New York City. In 1819, she was hanged for arson. At the time, the only capital crimes in New York State were first degree arson and murder. Butler was the penultimate person executed in New York State for arson. The last person to be executed for arson in the state was a white man named Horace Conkling in 1851.

== Early life ==
Butler was born in November 1799, in Mount Pleasant, New York. She was described as intelligent and having had "the benefit of instruction". She was enslaved by a one Colonel Straing in Mount Pleasant, before being sold as a slave to various other households. She was later enslaved by Abraham Child at his home in New York City. In 1817, she was sold to William L. Morris.

== Arson conviction and death sentence ==
In 1819, Butler was arrested for arson. She was charged with attempting to burn down the family home with the family inside; the damage was minor, but she was convicted and sentenced to death. The New York Supreme Court, after an appeal, ruled that what she did constituted first degree arson. After incarceration at the Bridewell prison, she was hanged near present-day Washington Square Park, from a gallows in the city's potter's field, on the eastern side of Minetta Creek, about 500 feet (150 m) from the Hangman's Elm. The hanging attracted an estimated 10,000 spectators.

The following doggerel lines were recalled 50 years later as having been "chalked about the fences":

Rose Butler sat upon a bench—
Down drop't the trap and hanged a negro wench.

== Media ==
- Rose Dies Friday (2019) by Annette Daniels Taylor, a short film (8:21) whose creator calls it a "cinematic poem".

== Archival material ==
The New-York Historical Society holds "a confession, statements, and an affidavit", a total of seven items. Included is a statement of Eliza Duell, a white woman placed in the apartment holding Butler during her arrest.
