= Waltham, Kent =

Village in Kent, England

Coordinates: 51.197860°N 1.016770°E

Waltham
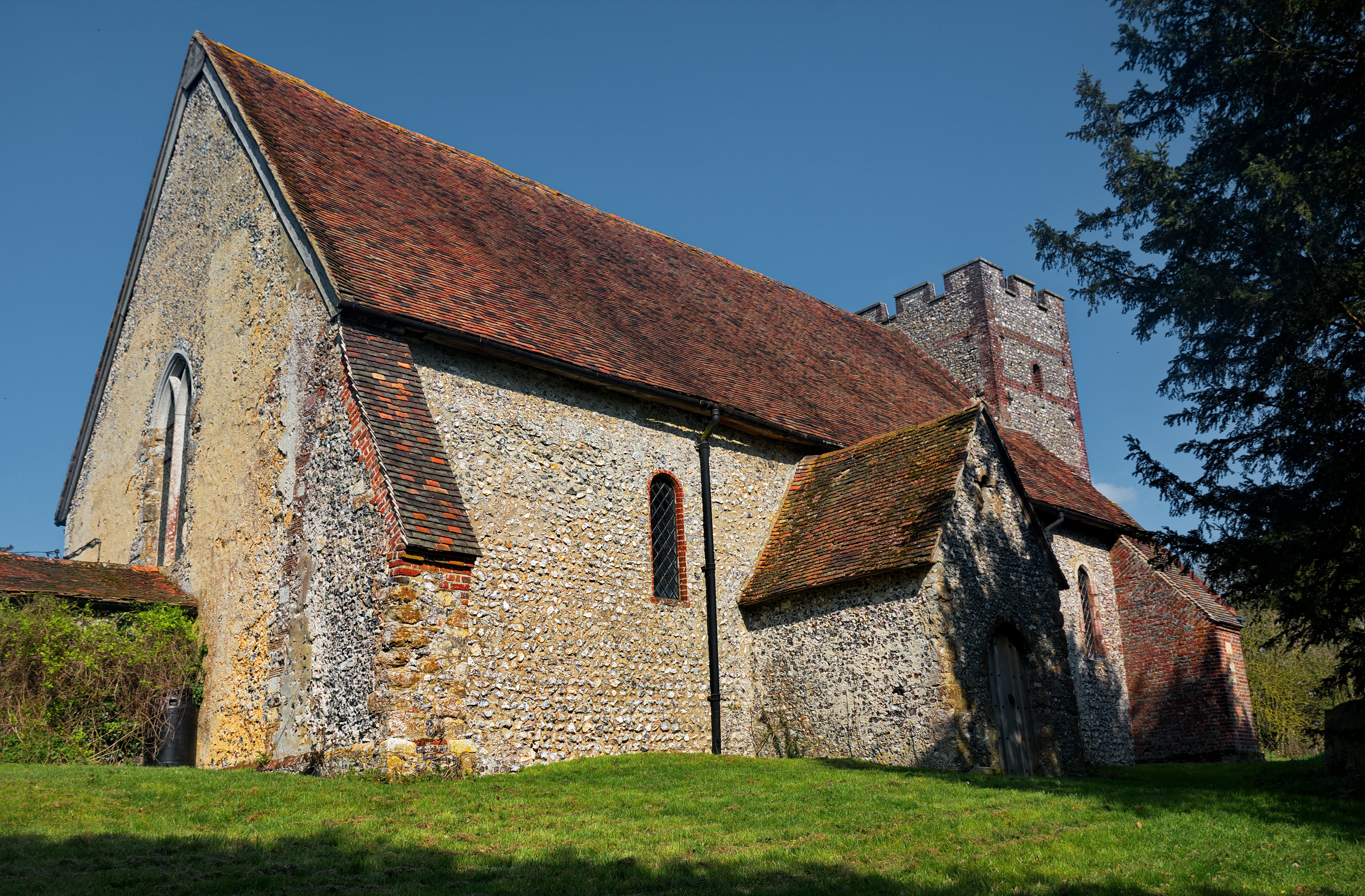
- St Bartholomew's Church, Waltham

- Location within Kent
- Area: 8.11 km^{2} (3.13 sq mi)
- Population: 436 (2011)
  - Density: 54/km^{2} (140/sq mi)
- Civil parish: Waltham
- District: City of Canterbury
- Shire county: Kent
- Region: South East
- Country: England
- Sovereign state: United Kingdom
- Post town: Canterbury
- Postcode district: CT4
- Police: Kent
- Fire: Kent
- Ambulance: South East Coast

Waltham is a village and civil parish 7 miles (11 km) southwest of Canterbury in Kent, England.

== History ==
The village was once associated with the Knights Templar and was originally called Temple Waltham.

Richard de Clare, 6th Earl of Gloucester, died at John de Criol's Manor of Asbenfield in Temple Waltham on 14 July 1262 at the age of 39; it was rumoured that he had been poisoned at the table of Piers of Savoy.

During and prior to the reign of Edward III (d. 1377), the parish of Waltham was within the hundred of Bridge. Following merger of some hundreds, by the end of the 19th century, most of the parish was within the hundred of Bridge and Petham. Of the two constables for the consolidated hundred, the current monarch was lord of the annual court leet that chose a constable for the hundred of Bridge.

== Amenities ==
St Bartholomew's Church is Grade I listed. Its windows are of the 13th and 14th century and its tower was rebuilt and restored in 1808.

Bus 620 runs between Canterbury, Hastingleigh and Waltham.

== See also ==
- Listed buildings in Waltham, Kent
