= Listed buildings in the City of Canterbury district, Kent =

There are about 1,900 listed buildings in the City of Canterbury district, which are buildings of architectural or historic interest.

- Grade I buildings are of exceptional interest.
- Grade II* buildings are particularly important buildings of more than special interest.
- Grade II buildings are of special interest.

The lists follow Historic England’s geographical organisation, with entries grouped by county, local authority, and parish (civil and non-civil). The following lists are arranged by parish. The listed buildings in Canterbury are presented in separate lists organised by geographical area.

Parish	Listed buildings list	Grade I	Grade II*	Grade II	Total
Adisham	Listed buildings in Adisham	1	0	13	14
Barham	Listed buildings in Barham, Kent	1	2	64	68
Bekesbourne-with-Patrixbourne	Listed buildings in Bekesbourne-with-Patrixbourne	2	2	33	37
Bishopsbourne	Listed buildings in Bishopsbourne	2	1	23	26
Blean	Listed buildings in Blean	0	1	13	14
Bridge	Listed buildings in Bridge, Kent	0	2	42	44
City of Canterbury, non civil parish	City of Canterbury, outside the city walls, south part City of Canterbury, outside the city walls, north part City of Canterbury, within the city walls, east part City of Canterbury, within the city walls, west part City of Canterbury, within the city walls, north part Herne Bay and Whitstable	35	50	983	1,068
Chartham	Listed buildings in Chartham	1	3	53	57
Chestfield	Listed buildings in Chestfield	0	0	9	9
Chislet	Listed buildings in Chislet	1	1	37	39
Fordwich	Listed buildings in Fordwich	1	2	26	29
Hackington	Listed buildings in Hackington	0	0	6	6
Harbledown and Rough Common	Listed buildings in Harbledown and Rough Common	1	0	32	33
Hersden	Listed buildings in Hersden	0	0	3	3
Herne and Broomfield	Listed buildings in Herne and Broomfield	2	0	40	42
Hoath	Listed buildings in Hoath	0	3	23	26
Ickham and Well	Listed buildings in Ickham and Well	1	2	43	46
Kingston	Listed buildings in Kingston, Kent	1	0	15	16
Littlebourne	Listed buildings in Littlebourne	2	1	54	57
Lower Hardres and Nackington	Listed buildings in Lower Hardres and Nackington	1	0	21	22
Petham	Listed buildings in Petham	1	2	40	43
Sturry	Listed buildings in Sturry	2	0	41	43
Thanington Without	Listed buildings in Thanington Without	0	3	5	8
Upper Hardres	Listed buildings in Upper Hardres	1	1	22	24
Waltham	Listed buildings in Waltham, Kent	1	1	20	22
Westbere	Listed buildings in Westbere	1	1	14	16
Wickhambreaux	Listed buildings in Wickhambreaux	2	2	45	49
Womenswold	Listed buildings in Womenswold	1	0	15	16
