= Lower Hardres =

Village in Kent, England

Coordinates: 51.236°N 1.080°E

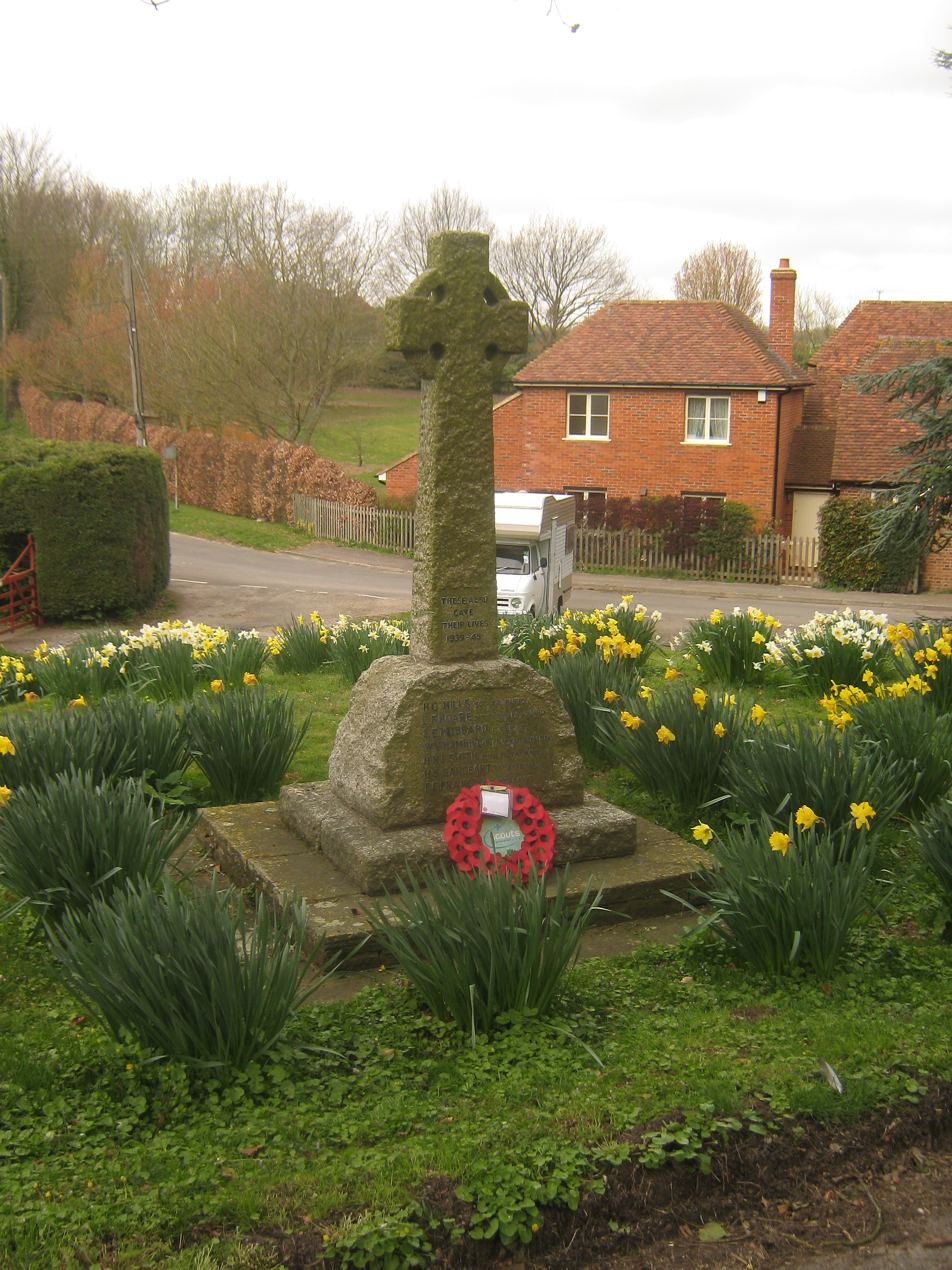
- War Memorial constructed by H G Browning to commemorate those who lost their lives in World War One

- Location within Kent
- Area: 9.14 km^{2} (3.53 sq mi)
- Population: 570 (Civil Parish 2011)
  - Density: 62/km^{2} (160/sq mi)
- OS grid reference: TR150530
- Civil parish: Lower Hardres and Nackington
- District: City of Canterbury
- Shire county: Kent
- Region: South East
- Country: England
- Sovereign state: United Kingdom
- Post town: CANTERBURY
- Postcode district: CT4
- Dialling code: 01227
- Police: Kent
- Fire: Kent
- Ambulance: South East Coast
- UK Parliament: Canterbury

Lower Hardres /hɑːrdz/ is a village and former civil parish, now in the parish of Lower Hardres and Nackington, in the City of Canterbury district of Kent, England.

== History ==
The name of the Hardres family is perpetuated in the twin villages of Upper Hardres and Lower Hardres (pronounced 'hards'), on the Roman road, Stone Street, south-west of the city of Canterbury. The family owned the non-church land of area for 700 years after the Norman Conquest.

=== Middle ages ===
A legal record in 1381 mentions William Sely, parson of "parva Ardres", & may indicate that a bell at Lower Hardres church was being made or repaired by John Buckingham. A debt of 45 marks is mentioned.

=== 19th century ===
Lower Hardes was the village in which the first thresher was destroyed as part of the Swing Riots, on 28 August 1830.

John Marius Wilson's Imperial Gazetteer of England and Wales described Lower Lardres as:

A parish in Bridge district, Kent; on Stane-street, 3 miles ESE of Chartham r. station, and 3¼ S of Canterbury.

=== 20th century ===
On 1 April 1934 the parish of Nackington was merged into "Lower Hardres", on 1 April 2019 the new parish was renamed to "Lower Hardres and Nackington". In 1931 the parish of Lower Hardres (prior to the merge) had a population of 254.

== Location ==
Lower Hardres consists of a branch of roads that stem mainly from Canterbury. The populated areas of Lower Hardres are situated on minor roads, these being; Hardres Ct Road, Bridge Road and Faucett Hill. The parish church, St. Mary's is located on the east edge of the village, however another St, Mary's church can be found in Nackington, north of Lower Hardres on Nackington Road on the B2068.

The Parish is engulfed in the countryside with fields bordering the area.

== The village ==
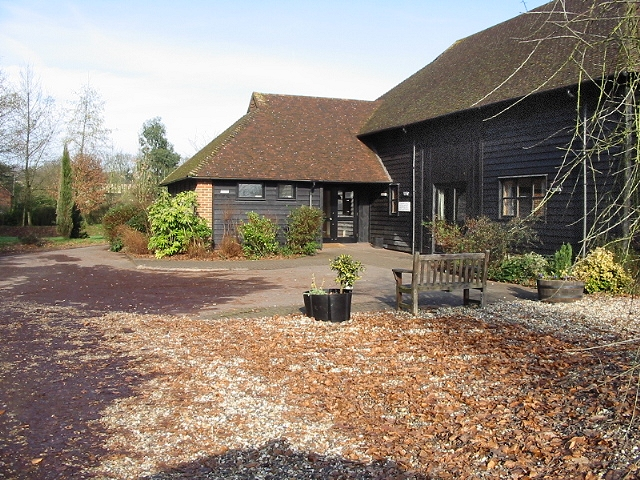
John Baker White memorial hall

There are currently no schools in the village, however there are primary schools within a couple of miles at Petham, Bridge and Bossingham. Garlinge Green has the closest secondary school to Lower Hardres and is just on the outskirts of Canterbury.

There are only a couple key buildings in the immediate area of the village. The village hall is situated within the center of the community and is more commonly known as the John Baker White Memorial Hall which was built in 1995. It has been awarded for its facilities and management, the hall itself is considered to be of rural nature on the outside, keeping in touch with the surroundings while boasting a more modern interior. It is home to a variety of local clubs, activities take place within the grounds and also different classes that are available for everyone. The hall can also be hired out as a venue for many different events.

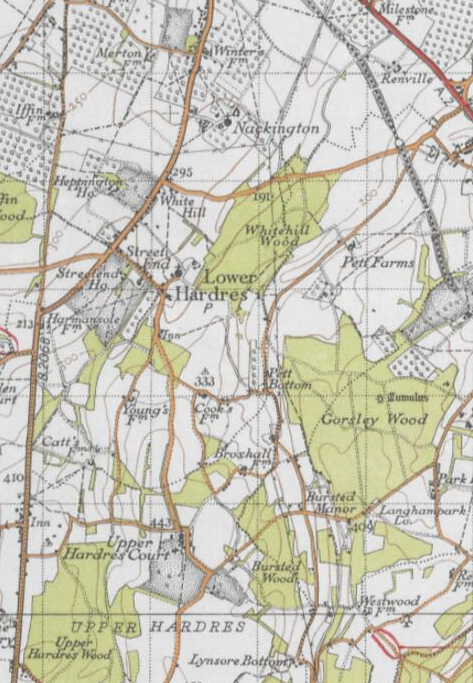
An Ordnance Survey road map of Lower Hardres and the surrounding areas in the 20th Century.

The Lower Hardres & Nackington Gardeners' Society also occupies the hall and supports Kents MS therapy centre where they have a stall for the centre at shows and offer activities and refreshments

There are a few different businesses scattered within the immediate area such as a pet store, hair salon, office supply shop and a sport shop specializing in maintenance of facilities and safety.

There are two farms being run from within the village, Butts Farm and Street End Farms.

=== Historical Buildings ===
Another influential building within the community when considering historical value is St Mary's, the local parish church is located on the eastern edge of the village. The church is believed to have been constructed around 1831-2 by Richmond and Hutchinson in an early English style on a similar if not the exact location an earlier church had occupied until being demolished. It contains a single stained glass window facing the east, behind the altar. The churchyard which occupied the land before the current

church contains headstones, as well as a small collection of chest tombs and oval bodystones.

== Demography ==
=== Population ===
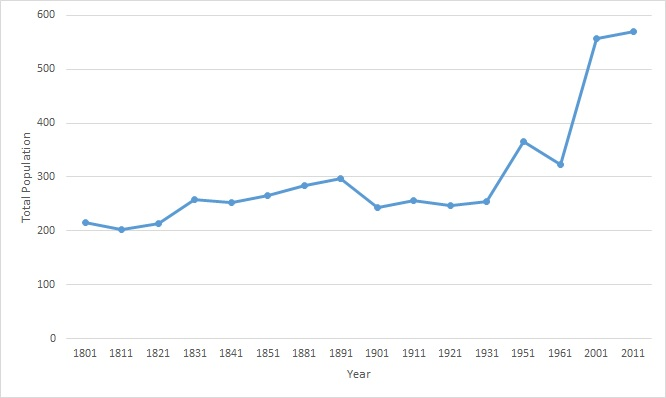
Census information from Vision of Britain and neighbourhood statistic has been combined to create a graph to show the total population in Lower Hardres.

Statistics from the census dating back to 1801 at the earliest offers a foundation for determining population growth. From the data collected the population of Lower Hardres was found to be at 215 during 1801. Between the 1911 and 1921 census there had been a decrease in population which could be an impact of the first world war and conscription.

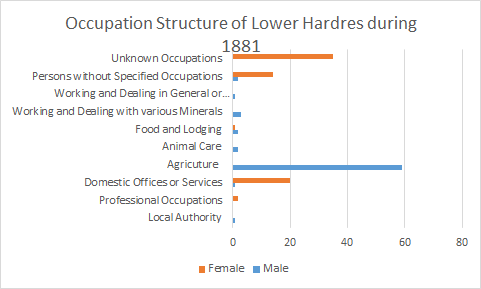
Occupation structure of the Lower hardres community concerning both males and females obtained from the 1881 census

The population fluctuated whilst still maintaining moderate growth until 1961. Recent Census results have shown a positive growth from 1961 to an increased population of 557 in 2001, and to 570 in 2011.

=== Occupation ===
The dominating sector from 1881 was agriculture with a high concentration of workers, predominantly male who could have been considered more appropriate for the type of work due to physical presence. There was also a high level of populace that had unknown occupations, also being only prominent with females, this may have been the cause of childbirth as a mother that worked to care for the family at home. Other professions such as authority lodging and animal care, were given considerably fewer workers.
