= Listed buildings in Lower Hardres and Nackington =

Historic structures in Kent, England

Lower Hardres and Nackington is a civil parish in the City of Canterbury district of Kent, England. It contains 22 listed buildings that are recorded in the National Heritage List for England. Of these one is grade I, 21 are grade II.

This list is based on the information retrieved online from Historic England.

== Key ==
Grade	Criteria
I	Buildings that are of exceptional interest
II*	Particularly important buildings of more than special interest
II	Buildings that are of special interest

== Listing ==
Name	Grade	Location	Type	Completed (Note: The date given is the date used by Historic England as significant for the initial building or that of an important part in the structure's description.)	Date designated	Grid ref. (Note: The grid reference is based on the British national grid reference system, sometimes known as OSGB36, used by the Ordnance Survey.) Geo-coordinates	Notes	Entry number (Note: The "List Entry Number" is a unique number assigned to each listed building and scheduled monument by Historic England.)	Image	Wikidata
Butt's Farmhouse	II	Butt's Green			30 January 1967	TR1510652982; 51°14′08″N 1°04′48″E		1052317	Upload Photo	Q26304104
Young's Farmhouse	II	Catt's Wood Road, Young's Farm			14 March 1980	TR1481252001; 51°13′36″N 1°04′31″E		1085573	Upload Photo	Q26373251
Court Lodge Farmhouse	II	Church Lane, Nackington			14 March 1980	TR1561554539; 51°14′57″N 1°05′18″E		1052257	Upload Photo	Q26304052
Parsonage House	II	Church Lane, Nackington			14 March 1980	TR1544954586; 51°14′59″N 1°05′09″E		1085574	Upload Photo	Q26373256
Mount Pleasant	II	Hardres Court Road, Lower Hardres			30 January 1967	TR1495353129; 51°14′13″N 1°04′40″E		1085576	Upload Photo	Q26373262
The Old Farmhouse	II	Hardres Court Road, Petham			30 January 1967	TR1490053143; 51°14′13″N 1°04′38″E		1367136	Upload Photo	Q26648659
Nackington War Memorial	II	Nackington Road (b2068), Junction With Church Lane, Nackington, CT4 7BA	war memorial		10 July 2017	TR1529654668; 51°15′02″N 1°05′01″E		1448198	Nackington War Memorial More images	Q66478869
Little Catt's Farmhouse	II	Little Catt's Farm			14 March 1980	TR1448151530; 51°13′22″N 1°04′13″E		1336569	Upload Photo	Q26621052
Barns at Stuppington Farm	II	Merton Lane			7 September 1973	TR1445255688; 51°15′36″N 1°04′20″E		1096955	Upload Photo	Q26389212
Merton Farmhouse	II	Merton Lane			3 December 1949	TR1496455248; 51°15′21″N 1°04′46″E		1096956	Upload Photo	Q26389213
Building to Right of Merton Farmhouse	II	Military Road			7 September 1973	TR1494455282; 51°15′22″N 1°04′45″E		1334308	Upload Photo	Q26618984
Church of St Mary	I	Nackington	church building		30 January 1967	TR1569254588; 51°14′59″N 1°05′22″E		1085575	Church of St Mary More images	Q17529531
Winter's Farmhouse	II	Nackington Road, Winter's Farm			14 March 1980	TR1544255242; 51°15′20″N 1°05′10″E		1372287	Upload Photo	Q26653417
Barn at Little Eaton Farm	II	Pett Bottom			10 May 2005	TR1607252738; 51°13′58″N 1°05′37″E		1391380	Upload Photo	Q26670745
Church of St Mary	II	School Lane, Lower Hardres	church building		30 January 1967	TR1524953174; 51°14′14″N 1°04′56″E		1372289	Church of St Mary More images	Q26653419
Lower Hardres War Memorial	II	School Lane, Junction With Hardres Court Road, Lower Hardres, CT4 5NS	war memorial		6 February 2018	TR1509953034; 51°14′09″N 1°04′48″E		1453079	Lower Hardres War Memorial More images	Q66479369
The Old Rectory	II	School Lane, Lower Hardres			14 March 1980	TR1519053149; 51°14′13″N 1°04′53″E		1085577	Upload Photo	Q26373267
Barn at Harmansole Farm	II	Stone Street			24 September 1985	TR1396452690; 51°14′00″N 1°03′49″E		1241596	Upload Photo	Q26534465
Harmansole Farmhouse	II	Stone Street, Harmansole Farm			30 January 1967	TR1398352711; 51°14′00″N 1°03′50″E		1085578	Upload Photo	Q26373273
Oast Kiln Range at Harmansole Farm	II	Stone Street	hop kiln		24 September 1985	TR1399252660; 51°13′59″N 1°03′50″E		1085474	Oast Kiln Range at Harmansole Farm More images	Q26372749
The Farmhouse and Attached Former Cart Store, Stuppington Court Farm	II	Stuppington Court Farm, Merton Lane			7 September 1973	TR1447855731; 51°15′37″N 1°04′22″E		1334346	Upload Photo	Q26619019
Cooks Farmhouse	II	Tapleys Hill, Cooks Farm			30 November 1967	TR1543352039; 51°13′37″N 1°05′03″E		1085579	Upload Photo	Q26373278

== See also ==
- Grade I listed buildings in Kent
- Grade II* listed buildings in Kent

== Sources ==
- Newman, John (2013) [1969], Kent: North-East and East, The Buildings of England, New Haven and London: Yale University Press, ISBN 978-0-300-18506-5
