= 2027 Canterbury City Council election =

2027 English local government election

- 6 May 2027

All 39 seats to Canterbury City Council 20 seats needed for a majority
Leader	Alan Baldock	Rachel Carnac	Mike Sole
Party	Labour	Conservative	Liberal Democrats
Leader's seat	Northgate	Reculver	Nailbourne
Last election	18 seats, 36.6%	8 seats, 24.4%	9 seats, 22.0%
Current seats	18	8	8
Leader	Clare Turnbull / Andrew Harvey
Party	Green	Independent
Leader's seat	Gorrell / West Bay
Last election	4 seats, 13.9%	0 seats, 2.8%
Current seats	4	1
Incumbent Leader
Alan Baldock
Labour Co-op
No overall control (Note: Labour minority.)

The 2027 Canterbury City Council election will be held on 6 May 2027 to elect members of Canterbury City Council in Kent, England. This will be on the same day as other local elections held across the United Kingdom.

== Background ==
=== Local government reorganisation ===
Due to proposed structural changes to local government in England, the 2023 election would have been the final election to the council before it was abolished and replaced by Mid Kent Council, a unitary authority. However, on 7 September 2026, the government announced it was withdrawing plans for the planned restructuring pending review. Following this announcement, local elections due to be held in 2027 under the existing local electoral calendar would proceed.

== Summary ==
=== Election result ===
2027 Canterbury City Council election
Party	Candidates	Seats	Gains	Losses	Net gain/loss	Seats %	Votes %	Votes	+/−
Labour		18 (Note: Current seats.)							
Conservative		8							
Liberal Democrats		8							
Green		4							
Independent		1							
