= Bossingham =

Village in Kent, England

Coordinates: 51.1996°N 1.0772°E

- Location within Kent
- OS grid reference: TR1548
- District: Canterbury
- Shire county: Kent
- Region: South East
- Country: England
- Sovereign state: United Kingdom
- Police: Kent
- Fire: Kent
- Ambulance: South East Coast

Bossingham is a village in the parish of Upper Hardres and the district of the City of Canterbury, Kent, England. It is located about five miles (8 km) south of Canterbury, and 2 miles (3.2 km) north of Stelling Minnis on a parallel road to the Roman road of Stone Street (the B2068 road).

There is one public house – the Hop Pocket, named after the large sacks in which hops were transported. The nearest general store and post office are in Stelling Minnis.
