= Listed buildings in Petham =

Historic structures in Kent, England

Petham is a village and civil parish in the City of Canterbury district of Kent, England. It contains 43 listed buildings that are recorded in the National Heritage List for England. Of these one is grade I, two are grade II* and 40 are grade II.

This list is based on the information retrieved online from Historic England.

== Key ==
Grade	Criteria
I	Buildings that are of exceptional interest
II*	Particularly important buildings of more than special interest
II	Buildings that are of special interest

== Listing ==
Name	Grade	Location	Type	Completed (Note: The date given is the date used by Historic England as significant for the initial building or that of an important part in the structure's description.)	Date designated	Grid ref. (Note: The grid reference is based on the British national grid reference system, sometimes known as OSGB36, used by the Ordnance Survey.) Geo-coordinates	Notes	Entry number (Note: The "List Entry Number" is a unique number assigned to each listed building and scheduled monument by Historic England.)	Image	Wikidata
Penny Pot House	II				14 March 1980	TR0944151399; 51°13′24″N 0°59′53″E		1085516	Upload Photo	Q26372951
Broadway Green Farmhouse	II	Broadway, Broadway Green Farm			14 March 1980	TR1238751066; 51°13′09″N 1°02′24″E		1085544	Upload Photo	Q26373090
Cherry Tree Cottage Plover's Cottage	II	Broadway			14 March 1980	TR1240851084; 51°13′10″N 1°02′25″E		1336594	Upload Photo	Q26621077
Petham House	II	Broadway			13 September 1993	TR1257251123; 51°13′11″N 1°02′33″E		1260412	Upload Photo	Q26551429
Capel Farmhouse	II	Capel Road, Capel Farm			14 March 1980	TR1112151403; 51°13′22″N 1°01′19″E		1085545	Upload Photo	Q26373094
Church Cottages	II	1 and 2, Church Lane			14 March 1980	TR1301851293; 51°13′16″N 1°02′57″E		1085546	Upload Photo	Q26373100
Barn at Court Lodge to North West of House	II	Church Lane			14 March 1980	TR1300251465; 51°13′21″N 1°02′56″E		1054692	Upload Photo	Q26306351
China Court	II	Church Lane			14 March 1980	TR1287551526; 51°13′24″N 1°02′50″E		1085547	Upload Photo	Q26373105
Church of All Saints	I	Church Lane	church building		30 January 1967	TR1306051245; 51°13′14″N 1°02′59″E		1336595	Church of All Saints More images	Q17529621
Court Lodge	II	Church Lane			30 January 1967	TR1301851421; 51°13′20″N 1°02′57″E		1367128	Upload Photo	Q26648653
Granary at Court Lodge to East of House	II	Church Lane			14 March 1980	TR1304351426; 51°13′20″N 1°02′58″E		1336596	Upload Photo	Q26621079
Duckpit	II	Duckpit			21 May 1976	TR1236850092; 51°12′38″N 1°02′21″E		1085548	Upload Photo	Q26373112
K6 Telephone Kiosk	II	Garlinge Green			13 July 1990	TR1128152528; 51°13′58″N 1°01′30″E		1085440	Upload Photo	Q26372571
Sappington Court	II	Garlinge Green, Sappington Court			14 March 1980	TR1140952862; 51°14′09″N 1°01′37″E		1054695	Upload Photo	Q26306354
The Old House	II	Garlinge Green			14 March 1980	TR1129752603; 51°14′01″N 1°01′31″E		1336558	Upload Photo	Q26621042
Barn at Wootton Farm	II	Garlinge Green Road, Wootton Farm			14 March 1980	TR1222351838; 51°13′35″N 1°02′17″E		1054705	Upload Photo	Q26306363
Barn to North East of Nos 1 and 2 (east Wootton Cottages)	II	Garlinge Green Road			14 March 1980	TR1234751704; 51°13′30″N 1°02′23″E		1085549	Upload Photo	Q26373117
Barn at Kenfield Farm to North East of Farmhouse	II	Kenfield Road			14 March 1980	TR1213852968; 51°14′11″N 1°02′15″E		1085552	Upload Photo	Q26373135
Gatepiers and Gates on West Side of Courtyard at Kenfield Hall	II	Kenfield Road, Kenfield Hall			30 January 1967	TR1195052528; 51°13′57″N 1°02′04″E		1054711	Upload Photo	Q26306369
Granary at Kenfield Farm to North East of Farmhouse	II	Kenfield Road			14 March 1980	TR1215452994; 51°14′12″N 1°02′16″E		1054718	Upload Photo	Q26306376
Kenfield Cottage	II	Kenfield Road			30 January 1967	TR1195052522; 51°13′57″N 1°02′04″E		1085550	Upload Photo	Q26373124
Kenfield Farmhouse	II	Kenfield Road, Kenfield Hall			14 March 1980	TR1212552955; 51°14′11″N 1°02′14″E		1085551	Upload Photo	Q26373129
Kenfield Hall	II*	Kenfield Road, Kenfield Hall			29 September 1952	TR1197252520; 51°13′57″N 1°02′06″E		1336559	Upload Photo	Q17557232
Kenfield Oast	II	Kenfield Road			30 January 1967	TR1208952985; 51°14′12″N 1°02′13″E		1054723	Upload Photo	Q26306380
Granary, Oasthouses and Oast Cottage at Swarling Manor	II	Oasthouses And Oast Cottage At Swarling Manor, Swarling Hill Road, Swarling Manor Farm			30 January 1967	TR1300352917; 51°14′08″N 1°03′00″E		1085560	Upload Photo	Q26373179
Dane Chantry	II	Stone Street, Dane Chantry			29 September 1952	TR1356549951; 51°12′32″N 1°03′22″E		1367114	Upload Photo	Q26648642
Lime Tree Farmhouse	II	Stone Street			30 January 1967	TR1378550975; 51°13′05″N 1°03′36″E		1054016	Upload Photo	Q26305703
Slippery Sam's Inn	II	Stone Street			1 October 1975	TR1372649715; 51°12′24″N 1°03′30″E		1085553	Upload Photo	Q26373140
Yew Tree Farmhouse	II	Stone Street			14 March 1980	TR1378450679; 51°12′55″N 1°03′35″E		1085554	Upload Photo	Q26373145
Swarling Manor	II	Swarling Hill Road, Swarling Manor Farm			29 September 1952	TR1297052879; 51°14′07″N 1°02′58″E		1054056	Upload Photo	Q26305739
1, 2 and 3, the Street	II	1, 2 and 3, The Street			14 March 1980	TR1279751505; 51°13′23″N 1°02′46″E		1054036	Upload Photo	Q26305721
Bank Cottages	II	1, 2 and 3, The Street			14 March 1980	TR1277851354; 51°13′18″N 1°02′45″E		1085555	Upload Photo	Q26373151
Old Hall	II*	5, The Street			14 March 1980	TR1276751433; 51°13′21″N 1°02′44″E		1054019	Upload Photo	Q17556980
Dormer Cottage	II	26, The Street			14 March 1980	TR1280751590; 51°13′26″N 1°02′47″E		1085558	Upload Photo	Q26373166
Cotterell Court	II	The Street			30 January 1967	TR1279251485; 51°13′22″N 1°02′46″E		1085557	Upload Photo	Q26373162
Forge Cottage Forge House	II	The Street			14 March 1980	TR1276351465; 51°13′22″N 1°02′44″E		1054052	Upload Photo	Q26305734
Lyon House	II	The Street	house		14 March 1980	TR1277551502; 51°13′23″N 1°02′45″E		1085559	Lyon House More images	Q26373173
Old Post House	II	The Street			14 March 1980	TR1277251378; 51°13′19″N 1°02′44″E		1085556	Upload Photo	Q26373154
Valley Side	II	The Street			14 March 1980	TR1279451558; 51°13′25″N 1°02′46″E		1054040	Upload Photo	Q26305725
Virginia Cottage	II	The Street			14 March 1980	TR1275151420; 51°13′20″N 1°02′43″E		1336560	Upload Photo	Q26621043
Debden Court	II	Town Road, Debden Court			14 March 1980	TR1276651692; 51°13′29″N 1°02′45″E		1054058	Upload Photo	Q26305741
Upper Thruxted Farmhouse	II	Upper Thruxted Farm			14 March 1980	TR0943251323; 51°13′22″N 0°59′52″E		1045799	Upload Photo	Q26297905
Little Swarling	II	Watery Lane			5 September 1975	TR1310852640; 51°13′59″N 1°03′04″E		1336561	Upload Photo	Q26621044

== See also ==
- Grade I listed buildings in Kent
- Grade II* listed buildings in Kent

== Sources ==
- Newman, John (2013) [1969], Kent: North-East and East, The Buildings of England, New Haven and London: Yale University Press, ISBN 978-0-300-18506-5
