= Listed buildings in Kingston, Kent =

Historic buildings in Kent, England

Kingston is a village and civil parish in the City of Canterbury district of Kent, England. It contains 16 listed buildings that are recorded in the National Heritage List for England. Of these one grade I and 15 are grade II.

This list is based on the information retrieved online from Historic England.

== Key ==
| Grade | Criteria |
|---|---|
| I | Buildings that are of exceptional interest |
| II* | Particularly important buildings of more than special interest |
| II | Buildings that are of special interest |

== Listing ==
| Name | Grade | Location | Type | Completed (Note: The date given is the date used by Historic England as significant for the initial building or that of an important part in the structure's description.) | Date designated | Grid ref. (Note: The grid reference is based on the British national grid reference system, sometimes known as OSGB36, used by the Ordnance Survey.) Geo-coordinates | Notes | Entry number (Note: The "List Entry Number" is a unique number assigned to each listed building and scheduled monument by Historic England.) | Image | Wikidata |
|---|---|---|---|---|---|---|---|---|---|---|
| Black Robin Public House | II | Black Robin Lane | | | 14 March 1980 | TR2016351244; 51°13′05″N 1°09′04″E | | 1049090 | Upload Photo | Q26301145 |
| Church of St Giles | I | Church Lane | church building | | 30 January 1967 | TR1980851261; 51°13′06″N 1°08′46″E | | 1373855 | Church of St Giles More images | Q17529658 |
| Kingston Court | II | Church Lane | | | 30 January 1967 | TR1987651244; 51°13′05″N 1°08′50″E | | 1085585 | Upload Photo | Q26373310 |
| Little Court | II | Church Lane | | | 14 March 1980 | TR1984551230; 51°13′05″N 1°08′48″E | | 1085584 | Upload Photo | Q26373304 |
| Rectory Cottage | II | Church Lane | | | 14 March 1980 | TR1984251349; 51°13′08″N 1°08′48″E | | 1336553 | Upload Photo | Q26621037 |
| Ileden Farmhouse | II | Dover Road, Ileden Farm | | | 14 March 1980 | TR2094052366; 51°13′40″N 1°09′47″E | | 1336573 | Upload Photo | Q26621055 |
| Marley Farmhouse | II | Marley Lane, Marley | | | 14 March 1980 | TR1882150288; 51°12′35″N 1°07′53″E | | 1085586 | Upload Photo | Q26373314 |
| Ally Cottage | II | The Street | | | 14 March 1980 | TR1986151373; 51°13′09″N 1°08′49″E | | 1336575 | Upload Photo | Q26621057 |
| Railway Cottage | II | The Street | | | 14 March 1980 | TR1962551220; 51°13′05″N 1°08′37″E | | 1336574 | Upload Photo | Q26621056 |
| Whitelocks | II | The Street | | | 14 March 1980 | TR1950351030; 51°12′59″N 1°08′30″E | | 1085587 | Upload Photo | Q26373320 |
| Whitelocks Farmhouse | II | The Street, Whitelocks Farm | | | 29 September 1952 | TR1950651003; 51°12′58″N 1°08′30″E | | 1085588 | Upload Photo | Q26373327 |
| Barn at Westwood Farm | II | Westwood, Westwood Farm | | | 14 March 1980 | TR1701950024; 51°12′29″N 1°06′20″E | | 1085590 | Upload Photo | Q26373339 |
| Granary at Westwood Farm | II | Westwood, Westwood Farm | | | 14 March 1980 | TR1700550054; 51°12′30″N 1°06′19″E | | 1085591 | Upload Photo | Q26373346 |
| Stables at Westwood Farm | II | Westwood, Westwood Farm | | | 14 March 1980 | TR1701650039; 51°12′30″N 1°06′20″E | | 1049044 | Upload Photo | Q26301098 |
| Westwood Farmhouse | II | Westwood, Westwood Farm | | | 14 March 1980 | TR1698150030; 51°12′30″N 1°06′18″E | | 1336576 | Upload Photo | Q26621058 |
| Westwood Farm Cottage | II | Westwood Road, Westwood | | | 3 December 2008 | TR1693350067; 51°12′31″N 1°06′16″E | | 1393202 | Upload Photo | Q26672384 |

== See also ==
- Grade I listed buildings in Kent
- Grade II* listed buildings in Kent

== Sources ==
- Newman, John (2013) [1969], Kent: North-East and East, The Buildings of England, New Haven and London: Yale University Press, ISBN 978-0-300-18506-5
