= Listed buildings in Fordwich =

Historic structures in Kent, England

Fordwich is a town and civil parish in the City of Canterbury district of Kent, England. It contains 29 listed buildings that are recorded in the National Heritage List for England. Of these one is grade I, two are grade II* and 26 are grade II.

This list is based on the information retrieved online from Historic England .

== Key ==
Grade	Criteria
I	Buildings that are of exceptional interest
II*	Particularly important buildings of more than special interest
II	Buildings that are of special interest

== Listing ==
Name	Grade	Location	Type	Completed (Note: The date given is the date used by Historic England as significant for the initial building or that of an important part in the structure's description.)	Date designated	Grid ref. (Note: The grid reference is based on the British national grid reference system, sometimes known as OSGB36, used by the Ordnance Survey.) Geo-coordinates	Notes	Entry number (Note: The "List Entry Number" is a unique number assigned to each listed building and scheduled monument by Historic England.)	Image	Wikidata
K6 Telephone Kiosk Outside George and Dragon Public House	II				16 March 1988	TR1795859743; 51°17′42″N 1°07′30″E		1336620	Upload Photo	Q26621102
Brooklands	II	45, Fordwich Road, Sturry			14 March 1980	TR1795759892; 51°17′47″N 1°07′30″E		1054861	Upload Photo	Q26306511
Bridge Over the Great Stour	II	Fordwich Road	bridge		14 March 1980	TR1796359803; 51°17′44″N 1°07′30″E		1336533	Bridge Over the Great Stour More images	Q26621017
Friendly Hall	II	Fordwich Road, Sturry			30 January 1967	TR1786660020; 51°17′51″N 1°07′25″E		1336605	Upload Photo	Q26621088
Stables to Tancrey	II	Fordwich Road			14 March 1980	TR1793659862; 51°17′46″N 1°07′29″E		1085628	Upload Photo	Q26373541
Tancrey	II	Fordwich Road			14 March 1980	TR1792859841; 51°17′45″N 1°07′28″E		1067820	Upload Photo	Q26320613
The George and Dragon Inn	II	Fordwich Road	pub		14 March 1980	TR1797359762; 51°17′43″N 1°07′30″E		1085629	The George and Dragon Inn More images	Q26373545
The Maltings	II	1, High Street			30 January 1967	TR1805259653; 51°17′39″N 1°07′34″E		1346206	Upload Photo	Q26629776
Bow Cottage	II	3 and 4, High Street			14 March 1980	TR1805359736; 51°17′42″N 1°07′34″E		1085663	Upload Photo	Q26373713
By the Way Cottage	II	High Street			30 January 1967	TR1804459571; 51°17′37″N 1°07′34″E		1063741	Upload Photo	Q26317034
Byway House	II	High Street			14 March 1980	TR1802859597; 51°17′37″N 1°07′33″E		1085666	Upload Photo	Q26373731
Fordwich Farmhouse	II	High Street	farmhouse		30 January 1967	TR1803859690; 51°17′40″N 1°07′34″E		1084321	Fordwich Farmhouse More images	Q26367957
Little Georgian House	II	High Street			14 March 1980	TR1805459587; 51°17′37″N 1°07′34″E		1085665	Upload Photo	Q26373724
Walnut Tree Cottage	II	High Street			14 March 1980	TR1805159637; 51°17′39″N 1°07′34″E		1085664	Upload Photo	Q26373719
Fourdoun Cottage Oak Cottage	II	5 and 6, King Street			16 December 1975	TR1800759747; 51°17′42″N 1°07′32″E		1085668	Upload Photo	Q26373742
Bridge View Oakdene Stour House	II	King Street			30 January 1967	TR1797959740; 51°17′42″N 1°07′31″E		1063744	Upload Photo	Q26317036
Church of St Mary	I	King Street	church building		30 January 1967	TR1810759826; 51°17′45″N 1°07′37″E		1063709	Church of St Mary More images	Q5117593
Garden Walls to Watergate House and Watergate Cottage	II	King Street			14 March 1980	TR1803659810; 51°17′44″N 1°07′34″E		1336532	Upload Photo	Q26621016
Give Ale Cottage	II	King Street			29 September 1952	TR1809059804; 51°17′44″N 1°07′37″E		1085669	Upload Photo	Q26373747
River House	II	King Street			14 March 1980	TR1801059765; 51°17′43″N 1°07′32″E		1068558	Upload Photo	Q26321263
The Crane House the Stocks Outside the Town Hall the Town Hall	II*	King Street	city hall		29 September 1952	TR1804759814; 51°17′44″N 1°07′34″E		1085670	The Crane House the Stocks Outside the Town Hall the Town Hall More images	Q17557071
The Manor House	II	King Street	house		29 September 1952	TR1803059753; 51°17′43″N 1°07′33″E		1063742	The Manor House More images	Q26317035
Walnut Tree House	II	King Street	house		14 March 1980	TR1806659757; 51°17′43″N 1°07′35″E		1085667	Walnut Tree House More images	Q26373737
Watergate Cottage Watergate House	II*	King Street	house		30 January 1967	TR1804659780; 51°17′43″N 1°07′34″E		1065708	Watergate Cottage Watergate House More images	Q17556987
Fordwich House	II	Moat Lane			14 March 1980	TR1794359520; 51°17′35″N 1°07′28″E		1085671	Upload Photo	Q26373752
Garden Wall to Fordwich House	II	Moat Lane	wall		14 March 1980	TR1798859509; 51°17′35″N 1°07′31″E		1068566	Garden Wall to Fordwich House More images	Q26321271
Five Church Cottages Little Monk's Monks Cottage Monk's Hall	II	School Lane			14 March 1980	TR1810159781; 51°17′43″N 1°07′37″E		1336531	Upload Photo	Q26621015
Spring Cottage	II	Spring Lane			14 March 1980	TR1811359688; 51°17′40″N 1°07′37″E		1336554	Upload Photo	Q26621038
The Old Rectory	II	Spring Lane			14 March 1980	TR1813259672; 51°17′40″N 1°07′38″E		1085630	Upload Photo	Q26373551

== See also ==
- Grade I listed buildings in Kent
- Grade II* listed buildings in Kent

== Sources ==
- Newman, John (2013) [1969], Kent: North-East and East, The Buildings of England, New Haven and London: Yale University Press, ISBN 978-0-300-18506-5
