= Listed buildings in Littlebourne =

Historic structures in Kent, England

Littlebourne is village and a civil parish in the City of Canterbury district of Kent, England. It contains 60 listed buildings that are recorded in the National Heritage List for England. Of these two are grade I, one is grade II* and 57 are grade II.

This list is based on the information retrieved online from Historic England.

== Key ==
Grade	Criteria
I	Buildings that are of exceptional interest
II*	Particularly important buildings of more than special interest
II	Buildings that are of special interest

== Listing ==
Name	Grade	Location	Type	Completed (Note: The date given is the date used by Historic England as significant for the initial building or that of an important part in the structure's description.)	Date designated	Grid ref. (Note: The grid reference is based on the British national grid reference system, sometimes known as OSGB36, used by the Ordnance Survey.) Geo-coordinates	Notes	Entry number (Note: The "List Entry Number" is a unique number assigned to each listed building and scheduled monument by Historic England.)	Image	Wikidata
12-18, Bekesbourne Lane	II	Littlebourne, 12-18 Bekesbourne Lane			14 March 1980	TR2094057342; 51°16′21″N 1°09′58″E		1051094	Upload Photo	
20, Bekesbourne Lane	II	Littlebourne, 20 Bekesbourne Lane			14 March 1980	TR2093957332; 51°16′20″N 1°09′58″E		1085593	Upload Photo	
Albion House	II	Littlebourne, 24-28 Bekesbourne Lane			21 July 1976	TR2093157311; 51°16′20″N 1°09′57″E		1051100	Upload Photo	
Albion Cottages	II	Littlebourne, 30-34 Bekesbourne Lane			14 March 1980	TR2093257297; 51°16′19″N 1°09′57″E		1336540	Upload Photo	
Leigh Leigh Cottage	II	Littlebourne, 36 Bekesbourne Lane			14 March 1980	TR2092857285; 51°16′19″N 1°09′57″E		1085594	Upload Photo	
Church of St Vincent	I	Littlebourne, Church Road			30 January 1967	TR2105557865; 51°16′37″N 1°10′05″E		1051071	Church of St Vincent More images	Q17529462
Littlebourne Court House	II	Littlebourne, Church Road			29 September 1952	TR2104457952; 51°16′40″N 1°10′05″E		1051104	Upload Photo	
Barn at Littlebourne Court	I	Littlebourne, Church Road			30 January 1967	TR2102857884; 51°16′38″N 1°10′04″E		1085595	Barn at Littlebourne Court More images	Q17529534
Grey Cottage	II	Littlebourne, 2 Church Road			14 March 1980	TR2109957740; 51°16′33″N 1°10′07″E		1085596	Upload Photo	
K6 Telephone Kiosk	II	Littlebourne, High Street			14 January 1988	TR2093157411; 51°16′23″N 1°09′58″E		1241618	Upload Photo	
Little Howletts	II	Littlebourne, High Street			30 January 1967	TR2085257426; 51°16′23″N 1°09′54″E		1336542	Upload Photo	
Littlebourne House	II	Littlebourne, High Street			30 January 1967	TR2102057375; 51°16′22″N 1°10′02″E		1051080	Upload Photo	
Garden Wall to Littlebourne House	II	Littlebourne, High Street			14 March 1980	TR2104457350; 51°16′21″N 1°10′03″E		1085599	Upload Photo	
The Anchor Inn	II	Littlebourne, High Street			29 September 1952	TR2094957377; 51°16′22″N 1°09′59″E		1372889	The Anchor Inn More images	
12, High Street	II	Littlebourne, 12 High Street			14 March 1980	TR2095257406; 51°16′23″N 1°09′59″E		1085601	Upload Photo	
14-20, High Street	II	Littlebourne, 14-20 High Street			14 March 1980	TR2094057411; 51°16′23″N 1°09′58″E		1051047	Upload Photo	
Rose Cottage	II	Littlebourne, 21 High Street			14 March 1980	TR2073357512; 51°16′26″N 1°09′48″E		1051057	Upload Photo	
Littlebourne Post Office	II	Littlebourne, 22 High Street			14 March 1980	TR2093157417; 51°16′23″N 1°09′58″E		1085602	Upload Photo	
24 and 26, High Street	II	Littlebourne, 24 and 26 High Street			14 March 1980	TR2092457422; 51°16′23″N 1°09′57″E		1051048	Upload Photo	
28, High Street	II	Littlebourne, 28 High Street			14 March 1980	TR2091757426; 51°16′23″N 1°09′57″E		1085603	Upload Photo	
30, High Street	II	Littlebourne, 30 High Street			1 October 1975	TR2090357434; 51°16′24″N 1°09′56″E		1051050	Upload Photo	
King William IV Public House	II	Littlebourne, 4 High Street			14 March 1980	TR2098857377; 51°16′22″N 1°10′01″E		1085600	King William IV Public House More images	
46 and 48, High Street	II	Littlebourne, 46 and 48 High Street			30 January 1967	TR2086857462; 51°16′25″N 1°09′55″E		1336541	Upload Photo	
The Bow Window Restaurant	II	Littlebourne, 50 High Street			30 January 1967	TR2086357475; 51°16′25″N 1°09′54″E		1085604	Upload Photo	
Woolton Farmhouse	II	Littlebourne, Littlebourn Road			30 January 1967	TR1899156902; 51°16′09″N 1°08′17″E		1085563	Upload Photo	
Littlebourne Mill	II	Littlebourne, Nargate Street			30 January 1967	TR2147658128; 51°16′45″N 1°10′27″E		1372272	Upload Photo	
Riverbank	II	Littlebourne, Nargate Street			14 March 1980	TR2120757768; 51°16′34″N 1°10′13″E		1336566	Upload Photo	
White Cottage	II	Littlebourne, 18 Nargate Street			14 March 1980	TR2101457635; 51°16′30″N 1°10′02″E		1085565	Upload Photo	
1 and 3, Nargate Street	II	Littlebourne, 1 and 3 Nargate Street			14 March 1980	TR2095657423; 51°16′23″N 1°09′59″E		1085568	Upload Photo	
Corner Cottage	II	Littlebourne, 2 Nargate Street			14 March 1980	TR2096357393; 51°16′22″N 1°09′59″E		1372870	Upload Photo	
4, Nargate Street	II	Littlebourne, 4 Nargate Street			14 March 1980	TR2096557408; 51°16′23″N 1°09′59″E		1336563	Upload Photo	
Little Court	II	Littlebourne, 5 Nargate Street			14 March 1980	TR2094757485; 51°16′25″N 1°09′59″E		1085569	Upload Photo	
Brewery Cottages	II	Littlebourne, 6 and 8 Nargate Street			10 June 1975	TR2096957422; 51°16′23″N 1°10′00″E		1085564	Upload Photo	
Brewery House	II	Littlebourne, 10 Nargate Street			14 March 1980	TR2097257434; 51°16′23″N 1°10′00″E		1336564	Upload Photo	
Brookland Cottages	II	Littlebourne, 20 and 22 Nargate Street			14 March 1980	TR2104657653; 51°16′30″N 1°10′04″E		1085566	Upload Photo	
Tudor Cottage	II	Littlebourne, 26 Nargate Street			14 March 1980	TR2110357645; 51°16′30″N 1°10′07″E		1336565	Upload Photo	
Old Waterway Cottage	II	Littlebourne, 28 Nargate Street			14 March 1980	TR2113257677; 51°16′31″N 1°10′09″E		1085567	Upload Photo	
Devon Cottage Grove Cottage	II	Littlebourne, 32 Nargate Street			30 January 1967	TR2121557781; 51°16′34″N 1°10′13″E		1051628	Upload Photo	
Old Hall	II	Littlebourne, 37 and 39 Nargate Street			30 January 1967	TR2105357689; 51°16′32″N 1°10′05″E		1051631	Upload Photo	
Nargate Cottages	II	Littlebourne, 55 and 57 Nargate Street			14 March 1980	TR2118757769; 51°16′34″N 1°10′12″E		1336567	Upload Photo	
Whitegate Cottage	II	Littlebourne, 59 Nargate Street			14 March 1980	TR2120257785; 51°16′35″N 1°10′12″E		1052306	Upload Photo	
Vine Cottages	II	Littlebourne, 61 and 63 Nargate Street			14 March 1980	TR2121557799; 51°16′35″N 1°10′13″E		1085570	Upload Photo	
The Old Vicarage	II	Littlebourne, 77 Nargate Street			29 September 1952	TR2124357858; 51°16′37″N 1°10′15″E		1052307	Upload Photo	
79-85, Nargate Street	II	Littlebourne, 79-85 Nargate Street			14 March 1980	TR2126357865; 51°16′37″N 1°10′16″E		1336568	Upload Photo	
Higham Farmhouse	II	Littlebourne, Stodmarsh Road			29 September 1952	TR1986259862; 51°17′43″N 1°09′08″E		1052312	Higham Farmhouse More images	Q26304099
Barn at Higham Farm	II	Littlebourne, Stodmarsh Road			14 March 1980	TR1984659916; 51°17′45″N 1°09′07″E		1085572	Upload Photo	
Swanton Farmhouse	II	Littlebourne, Swanton Lane			14 March 1980	TR2005958937; 51°17′13″N 1°09′16″E		1085571	Upload Photo	
The Manor House	II	Littlebourne, The Green			30 January 1967	TR2098757293; 51°16′19″N 1°10′00″E		1051079	Upload Photo	
1, The Green	II	Littlebourne, 1 The Green			30 January 1967	TR2096057355; 51°16′21″N 1°09′59″E		1051076	Upload Photo	
5, 7 and 9, The Green	II	Littlebourne, 5, 7 and 9 The Green			29 September 1952	TR2100757330; 51°16′20″N 1°10′01″E		1085597	Upload Photo	
Manor Oast Flats Adjoining the Manor House to the South West	II	Littlebourne, 15-23 The Green			16 December 1975	TR2096757261; 51°16′18″N 1°09′59″E		1085598	Upload Photo	
Coachman's Cottage	II	Littlebourne, 28, 28A, 28B The Hill			14 March 1980	TR2061357613; 51°16′30″N 1°09′42″E		1051061	Upload Photo	
Old Oast	II	Littlebourne, 72 The Hill			14 March 1980	TR2028657768; 51°16′35″N 1°09′25″E		1051064	Upload Photo	
Holly Lodge	II	Littlebourne, The Hill			14 March 1980	TR2035657746; 51°16′34″N 1°09′29″E		1336543	Upload Photo	
Brickkiln Cottages	II	Littlebourne,			5 August 1977	TR2033658267; 51°16′51″N 1°09′29″E		1336539	Upload Photo	
Dial Cottages	II	Littlebourne,			14 March 1980	TR2071557528; 51°16′27″N 1°09′47″E		1085605	Dial Cottages More images	
Elbridge Farmhouse	II*	Littlebourne,			29 September 1952	TR2031959591; 51°17′34″N 1°09′31″E		1372874	Upload Photo	
Elbridge House	II	Littlebourne,			29 September 1952	TR2040959668; 51°17′36″N 1°09′36″E		1336538	Upload Photo	
Granary at Elbridge Farm	II	Littlebourne,			14 March 1980	TR2029359629; 51°17′35″N 1°09′30″E		1372875	Upload Photo	
Oasthouses at Elbridge Farmhouse	II	Littlebourne,			14 March 1980	TR2030359621; 51°17′35″N 1°09′30″E		1085592	Upload Photo	

== See also ==
- Grade I listed buildings in Kent
- Grade II* listed buildings in Kent

== Sources ==
- Newman, John (2012) [1969], Kent: West and the Weald, The Buildings of England, New Haven and London: Yale University Press, ISBN 978-0-300-18509-6
