= Listed buildings in Wickhambreaux =

Civil Parish in Kent, England

Wickhambreaux is a village and civil parish in the City of Canterbury district of Kent, England. It contains 49 listed buildings that are recorded in the National Heritage List for England. Of these two are grade I, two are grade II* and 45 are grade II.

This list is based on the information retrieved online from Historic England.

== Key ==
Grade	Criteria
I	Buildings that are of exceptional interest
II*	Particularly important buildings of more than special interest
II	Buildings that are of special interest

== Listing ==
Name	Grade	Location	Type	Completed (Note: The date given is the date used by Historic England as significant for the initial building or that of an important part in the structure's description.)	Date designated	Grid ref. (Note: The grid reference is based on the British national grid reference system, sometimes known as OSGB36, used by the Ordnance Survey.) Geo-coordinates	Notes	Entry number (Note: The "List Entry Number" is a unique number assigned to each listed building and scheduled monument by Historic England.)	Image	Wikidata
K6 Telephone Kiosk	II				13 July 1990	TR2204858656; 51°17′01″N 1°10′58″E		1336623	Upload Photo	Q26621105
The Grove Ferry Inn	II	Grove Ferry Road	pub		5 September 1975	TR2354263159; 51°19′25″N 1°12′25″E		1085495	The Grove Ferry Inn More images	Q26372852
Bay Trees	II	Grove Hill, Grove			14 March 1980	TR2283660915; 51°18′13″N 1°11′44″E		1085496	Upload Photo	Q26372858
Frognall	II	Grove Road, Frognall			30 January 1967	TR2261959522; 51°17′29″N 1°11′29″E		1366593	Upload Photo	Q26648177
Ivy House Farmhouse	II	Grove Road, Grove			14 March 1980	TR2371261844; 51°18′42″N 1°12′31″E		1055859	Upload Photo	Q26307480
Newborns Farmhouse	II	Grove Road, Newborns Farm			30 January 1967	TR2299361430; 51°18′30″N 1°11′53″E		1085497	Upload Photo	Q26372864
Newnham Farmhouse	II	Grove Road			30 January 1967	TR2306760328; 51°17′54″N 1°11′54″E		1366556	Upload Photo	Q26648145
Supperton Farmhouse	II	Grove Road, Supperton Farm			30 January 1967	TR2252359912; 51°17′41″N 1°11′25″E		1336609	Upload Photo	Q26621092
Teedleham Farmhouse	II	Grove Road, Teedleham Farm			30 January 1967	TR2309661103; 51°18′19″N 1°11′58″E		1055858	Upload Photo	Q26307479
Kingsley House	II	Hollybush Lane			14 March 1980	TR2182360038; 51°17′46″N 1°10′50″E		1336610	Upload Photo	Q26621093
Former Outbuilding to Wickham House, Now in Grounds of Closes House	II	Now In Grounds Of Closes House, The Green			14 March 1980	TR2205058823; 51°17′07″N 1°10′58″E		1085493	Upload Photo	Q26372841
Quaives Cottages	II	Seaton Road			29 September 1952	TR2222758723; 51°17′03″N 1°11′07″E		1336631	Upload Photo	Q26621113
The Quaives	II	Seaton Road, Seaton			14 March 1980	TR2242258839; 51°17′07″N 1°11′18″E		1085618	Upload Photo	Q26373491
Barn at Undertrees Farm	II	Stodmarsh			2 October 2000	TR2247861132; 51°18′21″N 1°11′26″E		1385358	Upload Photo	Q26665147
Waterham Cottage	II	Stodmarsh, Waterham Cottage			30 January 1967	TR2222960546; 51°18′02″N 1°11′12″E		1085455	Upload Photo	Q26372653
Barn at Sawkinge Farmhouse	II	Stodmarsh Road, Stodmarsh			14 March 1980	TR2191160485; 51°18′01″N 1°10′55″E		1336636	Upload Photo	Q26621118
Cherry Lodge Cottage	II	Stodmarsh Road, Stodmarsh			14 March 1980	TR2199260578; 51°18′04″N 1°10′59″E		1336633	Upload Photo	Q26621115
Church of St Mary	I	Stodmarsh Road, Stodmarsh	church building		30 January 1967	TR2202360579; 51°18′04″N 1°11′01″E		1085456	Church of St Mary More images	Q17529513
Cornerways Old Post Office Stores	II	Stodmarsh Road, Stodmarsh			14 March 1980	TR2200460566; 51°18′03″N 1°11′00″E		1085460	Upload Photo	Q26372676
Great Puxton	II	Stodmarsh Road, Stodmarsh			14 March 1980	TR2059260424; 51°18′01″N 1°09′47″E		1336635	Upload Photo	Q26621117
Ivyhouse	II	Stodmarsh Road, Stodmarsh			14 March 1980	TR2194960522; 51°18′02″N 1°10′57″E		1366627	Upload Photo	Q26648208
Poplar Farm Barn	II	Stodmarsh Road, Stodmarsh			14 March 1980	TR2178960512; 51°18′02″N 1°10′49″E		1085458	Upload Photo	Q26372665
Poplar Farmhouse	II	Stodmarsh Road, Stodmarsh			14 March 1980	TR2176660482; 51°18′01″N 1°10′48″E		1085457	Upload Photo	Q26372658
Sawkinge Farm Cottage	II	Stodmarsh Road, Stodmarsh			14 March 1980	TR2192860515; 51°18′02″N 1°10′56″E		1085461	Upload Photo	Q26372681
Stable at Poplar Farm	II	Stodmarsh Road, Stodmarsh			14 March 1980	TR2176960506; 51°18′02″N 1°10′48″E		1336634	Upload Photo	Q26621116
Stodmarsh Court Farmhouse	II	Stodmarsh Road, Stodmarsh Court Farm			14 March 1980	TR2146760503; 51°18′02″N 1°10′32″E		1085459	Upload Photo	Q26372669
Church of St Andrew	I	The Green	church building		30 January 1967	TR2200358736; 51°17′04″N 1°10′56″E		1367089	Church of St Andrew More images	Q17529654
Former Stables to Wickham House	II	The Green			14 March 1980	TR2208658811; 51°17′06″N 1°11′00″E		1054781	Upload Photo	Q26306435
Oasthouse at Wickham Court	II	The Green			19 December 1977	TR2198158768; 51°17′05″N 1°10′55″E		1054784	Upload Photo	Q26306437
Old Bell House	II	The Green			30 January 1967	TR2211158723; 51°17′04″N 1°11′01″E		1085491	Upload Photo	Q26372834
Old Willow Farmhouse	II	The Green			30 January 1967	TR2209358698; 51°17′03″N 1°11′00″E		1085490	Upload Photo	Q26372829
The Old Stone House	II*	The Green			29 September 1952	TR2206658658; 51°17′02″N 1°10′59″E		1054855	Upload Photo	Q17556983
The Rose Inn	II	The Green	pub		30 January 1967	TR2210458751; 51°17′04″N 1°11′01″E		1367076	The Rose Inn More images	Q26648608
Wickham Court	II	The Green			29 September 1952	TR2204658774; 51°17′05″N 1°10′58″E		1085494	Upload Photo	Q26372845
Wickham House	II*	The Green	house		30 January 1967	TR2208858792; 51°17′06″N 1°11′00″E		1085492	Wickham House More images	Q17557043
Wickham Mill	II	The Green	mill		30 January 1967	TR2203558671; 51°17′02″N 1°10′57″E		1336608	Wickham Mill More images	Q26621091
Oast Cottages	II	1, 2 and 3, The Street			14 March 1980	TR2223858771; 51°17′05″N 1°11′08″E		1336597	Upload Photo	Q26621080
The White House	II	1 and 2, The Street			14 March 1980	TR2221258747; 51°17′04″N 1°11′07″E		1055776	Upload Photo	Q26307398
Bell Cottage	II	The Street			14 March 1980	TR2212258716; 51°17′03″N 1°11′02″E		1085464	Upload Photo	Q26372700
Dyke House	II	The Street			14 March 1980	TR2224458754; 51°17′04″N 1°11′08″E		1085466	Upload Photo	Q26372710
Fern Cottage the Cottage	II	The Street			8 October 1976	TR2226858804; 51°17′06″N 1°11′10″E		1085462	Upload Photo	Q26372688
Forge House	II	The Street			14 March 1980	TR2221358728; 51°17′04″N 1°11′07″E		1055760	Upload Photo	Q26307383
Garden Cottage	II	The Street			14 March 1980	TR2213658729; 51°17′04″N 1°11′03″E		1366624	Upload Photo	Q26648205
Ivy Cottage Orchard Cottage	II	The Street			14 March 1980	TR2227858818; 51°17′06″N 1°11′10″E		1055768	Upload Photo	Q26307390
Old Oast House	II	The Street			14 March 1980	TR2225058786; 51°17′05″N 1°11′09″E		1055771	Upload Photo	Q26307393
The Old Bakery	II	The Street			14 March 1980	TR2212758709; 51°17′03″N 1°11′02″E		1085465	Upload Photo	Q26372704
The Old Workhouse	II	The Street			19 December 1977	TR2229458816; 51°17′06″N 1°11′11″E		1055724	Upload Photo	Q26309472
The Tudor Cottage Restaurant	II	The Street			14 March 1980	TR2219958741; 51°17′04″N 1°11′06″E		1085463	Upload Photo	Q26372694

== See also ==
- Grade I listed buildings in Kent
- Grade II* listed buildings in Kent

== Sources ==
- Newman, John (2013) [1969], Kent: North-East and East, The Buildings of England, New Haven and London: Yale University Press, ISBN 978-0-300-18506-5
