= Listed buildings in Barham, Kent =

Civil Parish in Kent, England

Barham is a village and civil parish in the City of Canterbury district of Kent, England. It contains 68 listed buildings that are recorded in the National Heritage List for England. Of these two are grade I, two are grade II* and 64 are grade II.

This list is based on the information retrieved online from Historic England.

== Key ==
Grade	Criteria
I	Buildings that are of exceptional interest
II*	Particularly important buildings of more than special interest
II	Buildings that are of special interest

== Listing ==
Name	Grade	Location	Type	Completed (Note: The date given is the date used by Historic England as significant for the initial building or that of an important part in the structure's description.)	Date designated	Grid ref. (Note: The grid reference is based on the British national grid reference system, sometimes known as OSGB36, used by the Ordnance Survey.) Geo-coordinates	Notes	Entry number (Note: The "List Entry Number" is a unique number assigned to each listed building and scheduled monument by Historic England.)	Image	Wikidata
Barham Court Farm Barn	II				19 February 2001	TR2088850003; 51°12′23″N 1°09′39″E		1334954	Upload Photo	Q26619582
K6 Telephone Kiosk	II				13 July 1990	TR2066049471; 51°12′07″N 1°09′26″E		1336622	Upload Photo	Q26621104
Loggia, Attached Walls, Niches Containing Statues, Fountain, Stone Garden Ornaments, Statue and Urn in the Italian Garden to Broome Park Hotel	II	Attached Walls, Niches Containing Statues, Fountain, Stone Garden Ornaments, Statue And Urn In The Italian Garden To Broome Park Hotel, Canterbury Road, Broome Park Hotel			30 January 1967	TR2189348217; 51°11′24″N 1°10′27″E		1336874	Upload Photo	Q26621339
Farm Cottages, Barham Court	II	Barham Court, 1 and 2, The Street			30 January 1967	TR2092150030; 51°12′24″N 1°09′41″E		1336901	Upload Photo	Q26621366
The Steward's House, Broome Park Hotel	II*	Broome Park Hotel, Canterbury Road	hotel		30 January 1967	TR2203648172; 51°11′23″N 1°10′34″E		1111767	The Steward's House, Broome Park Hotel More images	Q17557094
Broome Cottage, Broome Park	II	Canterbury Road, CT4 6QX, Broome Park			14 March 1980	TR2192847992; 51°11′17″N 1°10′28″E		1084928	Upload Photo	Q26369851
Broome Park Hotel	I	Canterbury Road, CT4 6QX, Broome Park Hotel	country club		29 September 1952	TR2186848244; 51°11′25″N 1°10′26″E		1084927	Broome Park Hotel More images	Q15205134
The Stables of Broome Park Hotel	II	Canterbury Road, Broome Park Hotel			30 January 1967	TR2193648254; 51°11′25″N 1°10′29″E		1337428	Upload Photo	Q26621845
4, Derringstone Green	II	4, Derringstone Green			30 January 1967	TR2059949426; 51°12′05″N 1°09′23″E		1111769	Upload Photo	Q26405566
The Old Farmhouse	II	Derringstone Green			14 March 1980	TR2063049432; 51°12′05″N 1°09′24″E		1084890	Upload Photo	Q26369652
Barham Methodist Chapel	II	Derringstone Hill			14 March 1980	TR2063249329; 51°12′02″N 1°09′24″E		1084884	Upload Photo	Q26369619
Brown Cottage	II	Derringstone Hill			14 March 1980	TR2062449268; 51°12′00″N 1°09′24″E		1084885	Upload Photo	Q26369626
Derringstone Hill Farmhouse	II	Derringstone Hill, Derringstone Hill Farm			14 March 1980	TR2065849278; 51°12′00″N 1°09′26″E		1084887	Upload Photo	Q26369636
Derringstone Hill House	II	Derringstone Hill			14 March 1980	TR2062649278; 51°12′00″N 1°09′24″E		1336893	Upload Photo	Q26621358
Duniston Court	II	Derringstone Hill			14 March 1980	TR2062149241; 51°11′59″N 1°09′24″E		1336894	Upload Photo	Q26621359
Sydney House	II	Derringstone Hill			14 March 1980	TR2066349332; 51°12′02″N 1°09′26″E		1084886	Upload Photo	Q26369631
Broome Cottage	II	Derringstone Street			14 March 1980	TR2062549412; 51°12′05″N 1°09′24″E		1084888	Upload Photo	Q26369641
Derringstone Manor	II	Derringstone Street			14 March 1980	TR2057249435; 51°12′05″N 1°09′22″E		1337028	Upload Photo	Q26621483
Footbridge at Ford	II	Derringstone Street			14 March 1980	TR2055449460; 51°12′06″N 1°09′21″E		1111782	Upload Photo	Q26405577
Ford Cottage	II	Derringstone Street			14 March 1980	TR2052049453; 51°12′06″N 1°09′19″E		1336896	Upload Photo	Q26621361
Friends Cottage	II	Derringstone Street			14 March 1980	TR2059149531; 51°12′09″N 1°09′23″E		1336897	Upload Photo	Q26621362
Ivy House	II	Derringstone Street			30 January 1967	TR2047449454; 51°12′06″N 1°09′17″E		1084889	Upload Photo	Q26369648
Jock's Lodge	II	Derringstone Street			14 March 1980	TR2063449409; 51°12′05″N 1°09′25″E		1336895	Upload Photo	Q26621360
Dolls House Restaurant	II	Elham Valley Road			14 March 1980	TR1982247713; 51°11′11″N 1°08′39″E		1084898	Upload Photo	Q26369698
Heart's Delight Farmhouse	II	Green Hills, Heart's Delight			29 September 1952	TR1961649911; 51°12′22″N 1°08′33″E		1084892	Upload Photo	Q26369663
Horsehead Farm	II	Greenhills, CT4 6JY, Horsehead Farm			14 March 1980	TR1853049207; 51°12′01″N 1°07′36″E		1111747	Upload Photo	Q26405546
Apple Cottage	II	Out Elmstead Lane, Out Elmstead			14 March 1980	TR2044150842; 51°12′51″N 1°09′18″E		1084893	Upload Photo	Q26369670
Black Mill Cottage	II	Out Elmstead Lane, Out Elmstead			14 March 1980	TR2041750923; 51°12′54″N 1°09′17″E		1111912	Upload Photo	Q26405736
Digges Place	II	Out Elmstead Lane, Out Elmstead			29 September 1952	TR2029850877; 51°12′52″N 1°09′11″E		1084894	Upload Photo	Q26369674
Elmstone Court	II	Out Elmstead Lane, Out Elmstead			14 March 1980	TR2042950794; 51°12′50″N 1°09′17″E		1336899	Upload Photo	Q26621364
Footbridge Over Ford	II	Out Elmstead Lane, Out Elmstead			14 March 1980	TR2025850808; 51°12′50″N 1°09′08″E		1111752	Upload Photo	Q26405551
Former Barn to Digges Place	II	Out Elmstead Lane, Out Elmstead			14 March 1980	TR2035850883; 51°12′53″N 1°09′14″E		1084895	Upload Photo	Q26369680
Garden Wall to Digges Place	II	Out Elmstead Lane, Out Elmstead			14 March 1980	TR2031150841; 51°12′51″N 1°09′11″E		1111753	Upload Photo	Q26405552
Gatepiers to Elmstone Court	II	Out Elmstead Lane, Out Elmstead			14 March 1980	TR2040950803; 51°12′50″N 1°09′16″E		1111750	Upload Photo	Q26405548
Railway Cottages	II	3 and 4, Railway Hill			14 March 1980	TR2041649452; 51°12′06″N 1°09′14″E		1111776	Upload Photo	Q26405572
Cornerways	II	Railway Hill			14 March 1980	TR2052249470; 51°12′07″N 1°09′19″E		1084891	Upload Photo	Q26369658
Days Cottage	II	Railway Hill			14 March 1980	TR2047949476; 51°12′07″N 1°09′17″E		1336898	Upload Photo	Q26621363
Farm Cottage	II	Railway Hill			14 March 1980	TR2051349473; 51°12′07″N 1°09′19″E		1111746	Upload Photo	Q26405544
Beggars Cottage Finch Cottage Meadow Cottage	II	2, Railway Terrace, Derringstone			3 July 1987	TR2049149469; 51°12′07″N 1°09′17″E		1085475	Upload Photo	Q26372756
Egerton House	II	Rectory Lane			14 March 1980	TR2097850106; 51°12′27″N 1°09′44″E		1336903	Upload Photo	Q26621368
The Old Rectory	II	Rectory Lane			15 September 1999	TR2095150504; 51°12′40″N 1°09′43″E		1078341	Upload Photo	Q26347974
Barn to Little Breach Farmhouse	II	South Barham Road, Little Breach Farm			14 March 1980	TR1966847717; 51°11′11″N 1°08′31″E		1084899	Upload Photo	Q26369704
Barn to South Barham Farm Cottage	II	South Barham Road, South Barham Farm			14 March 1980	TR2002148572; 51°11′38″N 1°08′51″E		1111868	Upload Photo	Q26405674
Breach Farmhouse	II	South Barham Road, Breach Farm			30 January 1967	TR1982447650; 51°11′09″N 1°08′39″E		1111914	Upload Photo	Q26405739
Heaselands	II	South Barham Road, South Barham			14 March 1980	TR2045449371; 51°12′04″N 1°09′15″E		1084897	Upload Photo	Q26369693
Little Breach Cottage	II	South Barham Road, Breach			14 March 1980	TR1966747782; 51°11′13″N 1°08′31″E		1111903	Upload Photo	Q26405723
Little Breach Farmhouse	II	South Barham Road, Little Breach Farm			30 January 1967	TR1966847755; 51°11′12″N 1°08′31″E		1111900	Upload Photo	Q26405718
South Barham Farm Cottage	II	South Barham Road, South Barham Farm			14 March 1980	TR2002448536; 51°11′37″N 1°08′51″E		1084900	Upload Photo	Q26369707
Blacking Bottle Cottage Bwthyn Clyd Jasmine	II	3, The Street			14 March 1980	TR2078550107; 51°12′27″N 1°09′34″E		1336902	Upload Photo	Q26621367
Anne Court Barham Court	II*	The Street			29 September 1952	TR2098850059; 51°12′25″N 1°09′44″E		1336516	Upload Photo	Q96311968
Barham House Nursing Home	II	The Street			30 January 1967	TR2089550116; 51°12′27″N 1°09′40″E		1336965	Upload Photo	Q26621426
Bridge Cottage	II	The Street			14 March 1980	TR2065450073; 51°12′26″N 1°09′27″E		1111850	Upload Photo	Q26405647
Church Cottage	II	The Street			30 January 1967	TR2094250028; 51°12′24″N 1°09′42″E		1336975	Upload Photo	Q26621435
Church of St John the Baptist	I	The Street	church building		30 January 1967	TR2097150000; 51°12′23″N 1°09′43″E		1084903	Church of St John the Baptist More images	Q17529465
Clare Cottage	II	The Street			14 March 1980	TR2066650071; 51°12′26″N 1°09′28″E		1084904	Upload Photo	Q26369726
Court Cottage	II	The Street			30 January 1967	TR2099050108; 51°12′27″N 1°09′45″E		1085715	Upload Photo	Q26373967
Dane Cottage	II	The Street			14 March 1980	TR2067550073; 51°12′26″N 1°09′28″E		1111853	Upload Photo	Q26405652
Old Well House Rose Cottage	II	The Street			30 January 1967	TR2090150062; 51°12′25″N 1°09′40″E		1111874	Upload Photo	Q26405683
Shirley Syringa	II	The Street			14 March 1980	TR2086350092; 51°12′26″N 1°09′38″E		1084902	Upload Photo	Q26369721
The Garden Wall of Barham Court and Anne Court	II	The Street			30 January 1967	TR2096150041; 51°12′25″N 1°09′43″E		1336517	Upload Photo	Q26621002
The Old Bakehouse	II	The Street			14 March 1980	TR2072650069; 51°12′26″N 1°09′31″E		1084901	Upload Photo	Q26369713
The Old Dairy House	II	The Street			14 March 1980	TR2096950086; 51°12′26″N 1°09′43″E		1085716	Upload Photo	Q26373971
The Old House	II	The Street			30 January 1967	TR2082350090; 51°12′26″N 1°09′36″E		1111870	Upload Photo	Q26405677
Theberton House	II	The Street			14 March 1980	TR2081250122; 51°12′27″N 1°09′35″E		1084905	Upload Photo	Q26369732
Yew Tree Cottage	II	The Street			14 March 1980	TR2085050089; 51°12′26″N 1°09′37″E		1336900	Upload Photo	Q26621365
Riverside Riverside Cottage	II	Valley Road			14 March 1980	TR2063149970; 51°12′23″N 1°09′26″E		1336518	Upload Photo	Q26621003
The Little Manor	II	Valley Road			30 January 1967	TR2056050101; 51°12′27″N 1°09′22″E		1085717	Upload Photo	Q26373976
The Red House	II	Valley Road			29 September 1952	TR2068549478; 51°12′07″N 1°09′27″E		1085718	Upload Photo	Q26373982

== See also ==
- Grade I listed buildings in Kent
- Grade II* listed buildings in Kent

== Sources ==
- Newman, John (2013) [1969], Kent: North-East and East, The Buildings of England, New Haven and London: Yale University Press, ISBN 978-0-300-18506-5
