= Listed buildings in Hoath =

Historic structures in Kent, England

Hoath is a village and civil parish in the City of Canterbury district of Kent, England. It contains 26 listed buildings that are recorded in the National Heritage List for England. Of these three are grade II* and 23 are grade II.

This list is based on the information retrieved online from Historic England.

== Key ==
Grade	Criteria
I	Buildings that are of exceptional interest
II*	Particularly important buildings of more than special interest
II	Buildings that are of special interest

== Listing ==
Name	Grade	Location	Type	Completed (Note: The date given is the date used by Historic England as significant for the initial building or that of an important part in the structure's description.)	Date designated	Grid ref. (Note: The grid reference is based on the British national grid reference system, sometimes known as OSGB36, used by the Ordnance Survey.) Geo-coordinates	Notes	Entry number (Note: The "List Entry Number" is a unique number assigned to each listed building and scheduled monument by Historic England.)	Image	Wikidata
Church of the Holy Cross	II*		church building		30 January 1967	TR2030864190; 51°20′03″N 1°09′41″E		1085646	Church of the Holy Cross More images	Q17557067
Hoath Court	II				30 January 1967	TR2024864174; 51°20′02″N 1°09′38″E		1068801	Upload Photo	Q26321494
Old Post Office	II				14 March 1980	TR2016264113; 51°20′00″N 1°09′33″E		1085645	Upload Photo	Q26373627
Pear Tree Cottage	II	CT3 4LW			31 March 2020	TR2023065001; 51°20′29″N 1°09′38″E		1465521	Upload Photo	Q97466049
Rotherfield	II				14 March 1980	TR2034164145; 51°20′01″N 1°09′42″E		1356118	Upload Photo	Q26638813
The Mill House	II				30 January 1967	TR2092564654; 51°20′17″N 1°10′14″E		1085647	Upload Photo	Q26373632
Park Cottages	II	1 and 2, Ford			14 May 1976	TR2038365715; 51°20′52″N 1°09′48″E		1336848	Upload Photo	Q26621313
The Manor House	II	Ford			29 September 1951	TR2047065699; 51°20′51″N 1°09′52″E		1085033	Upload Photo	Q26370426
The Homestead	II	Hicks Forstal Road, Knave's Ash			14 May 1976	TR1968164150; 51°20′02″N 1°09′08″E		1336861	Upload Photo	Q26621326
Barn at Buckwell Farm	II	Hoath Road, Buckwell Farm			14 March 1980	TR1905963125; 51°19′30″N 1°08′34″E		1372035	Upload Photo	Q26653160
Buckwell Farmhouse	II	Hoath Road, Buckwell Farm			30 January 1967	TR1905763058; 51°19′28″N 1°08′34″E		1085536	Upload Photo	Q26373053
Oasthouse at Buckwell Farm	II	Hoath Road, Buckwell Farm			14 March 1980	TR1908763092; 51°19′29″N 1°08′35″E		1336589	Upload Photo	Q26621072
Oasthouses and Granary at Tile Lodge Farm	II	Hoath Road, Tile Lodge Farm			14 March 1980	TR1917662519; 51°19′10″N 1°08′39″E		1040004	Upload Photo	Q26291808
Tile Lodge Farmhouse	II	Hoath Road, Tile Lodge Farm			14 March 1980	TR1916162473; 51°19′09″N 1°08′38″E		1085535	Upload Photo	Q26373046
Maypole Thatch	II*	Maypole Lane, Maypole			14 March 1980	TR2041464967; 51°20′28″N 1°09′48″E		1343666	Upload Photo	Q17557269
Green Oak Farm	II	Maypole Road, Maypole			14 May 1976	TR2010364846; 51°20′24″N 1°09′32″E		1084983	Upload Photo	Q26370152
Little Rushbourne Farmhouse	II	Maypole Road, Rushbourne Farm			14 March 1980	TR1960463579; 51°19′44″N 1°09′03″E		1343679	Upload Photo	Q26627460
Maypole House	II	Maypole Road, Maypole			29 September 1951	TR2004564715; 51°20′20″N 1°09′28″E		1145859	Upload Photo	Q26439009
My Home	II	Maypole Road, Maypole			14 March 1980	TR2015764863; 51°20′25″N 1°09′34″E		1343626	Upload Photo	Q26627410
Orchard House	II	Maypole Road, Maypole			14 March 1980	TR2010664746; 51°20′21″N 1°09′31″E		1085649	Upload Photo	Q26373644
Rushbourne Manor	II	Maypole Road, Rushbourne Manor			29 September 1952	TR1969263744; 51°19′49″N 1°09′08″E		1085648	Upload Photo	Q26373638
Barn at Ford Manor Situated to North East of the House	II	Mill Bank, Ford Manor Farm			30 January 1967	TR2056465741; 51°20′53″N 1°09′57″E		1343629	Upload Photo	Q26627412
Ford Manor Farmhouse	II	Mill Bank, Ford Manor Farm			30 January 1967	TR2049865697; 51°20′51″N 1°09′54″E		1085650	Upload Photo	Q26373649
Home Leigh Hurst Cottage	II	Mill Bank, Millbank			14 March 1980	TR2040465348; 51°20′40″N 1°09′48″E		1085606	Upload Photo	Q26373425
Old Tree Farmhouse	II	Old Tree Farm			14 March 1980	TR2098664759; 51°20′20″N 1°10′17″E		1343665	Upload Photo	Q26627448
Shelvingford Farmhouse	II*	Shelvingford, CT3 4LG			14 March 1980	TR2112865412; 51°20′41″N 1°10′26″E		1336522	Upload Photo	Q26263512

== See also ==
- Grade I listed buildings in Kent
- Grade II* listed buildings in Kent

== Sources ==
- Newman, John (2013) [1969], Kent: North-East and East, The Buildings of England, New Haven and London: Yale University Press, ISBN 978-0-300-18506-5
