= Listed buildings in Ickham and Well =

Historic structures in Kent, England

Ickham and Well is a civil parish covering the villages of Ickham and Bramling in the City of Canterbury district of Kent, England. It contains 46 listed buildings that are recorded in the National Heritage List for England. Of these one is grade I, two are grade II* and 43 are grade II.

This list is based on the information retrieved online from Historic England.

== Key ==
Grade	Criteria
I	Buildings that are of exceptional interest
II*	Particularly important buildings of more than special interest
II	Buildings that are of special interest

== Listing ==
Name	Grade	Location	Type	Completed (Note: The date given is the date used by Historic England as significant for the initial building or that of an important part in the structure's description.)	Date designated	Grid ref. (Note: The grid reference is based on the British national grid reference system, sometimes known as OSGB36, used by the Ordnance Survey.) Geo-coordinates	Notes	Entry number (Note: The "List Entry Number" is a unique number assigned to each listed building and scheduled monument by Historic England.)	Image	Wikidata
New Place	II*				29 September 1952	TR2228757870; 51°16′36″N 1°11′09″E		1085607	Upload Photo	Q17557062
The Baye House	II	7, Baye Lane, Ickham			30 January 1967	TR2238357949; 51°16′38″N 1°11′14″E		1085609	Upload Photo	Q26373438
Appletree Cottages	II	Bramling			14 March 1980	TR2267856751; 51°15′59″N 1°11′26″E		1085613	Upload Photo	Q26373461
April Cottage	II	Bramling			14 March 1980	TR2219557003; 51°16′08″N 1°11′02″E		1085611	Upload Photo	Q26373448
Baker's Cottage	II	Bramling			14 March 1980	TR2262756817; 51°16′01″N 1°11′24″E		1336548	Upload Photo	Q26621032
Barn at Duckpits Farm	II	Bramling			14 March 1980	TR2202956974; 51°16′07″N 1°10′53″E		1336546	Upload Photo	Q26621030
Buckett	II	Bramling			14 March 1980	TR2218157006; 51°16′08″N 1°11′01″E		1336547	Upload Photo	Q26621031
Duckpits Farmhouse	II	Bramling			14 March 1980	TR2201956999; 51°16′08″N 1°10′53″E		1085610	Upload Photo	Q26373442
Laundry Cottage	II	Bramling			14 March 1980	TR2254856855; 51°16′03″N 1°11′20″E		1067715	Upload Photo	Q26320513
The Haywain Public House	II	Bramling	pub		1 February 1977	TR2272456721; 51°15′58″N 1°11′29″E		1067720	The Haywain Public House More images	Q26320518
White Cottage	II	Bramling			14 March 1980	TR2251456853; 51°16′03″N 1°11′18″E		1085612	Upload Photo	Q26373455
Bramling Court	II	Bramling Road, Bramling			14 March 1980	TR2264356555; 51°15′53″N 1°11′24″E		1085614	Upload Photo	Q26373467
Cherville Oast	II	Cherville Lane			1 October 1975	TR2229757191; 51°16′14″N 1°11′08″E		1067684	Upload Photo	Q26320485
Westonhanger	II	Drill Lane, Ickham			14 March 1980	TR2191958252; 51°16′49″N 1°10′50″E		1336549	Upload Photo	Q26621033
2, 4, 6, 8 and 10 Ickham Court Farm	II	The Street, Ickham			14 March 1980	TR2213258059; 51°16′42″N 1°11′01″E		1049079	Upload Photo	Q26301135
Archway at Lee Priory	II	Lee Priory			23 March 1977	TR2161657029; 51°16′09″N 1°10′32″E		1076990	Upload Photo	Q26343054
Garden Cottages	II	Lee Priory			14 March 1980	TR2128056838; 51°16′04″N 1°10′14″E		1336550	Upload Photo	Q26621034
Lee House	II	Lee Priory			14 March 1980	TR2128056894; 51°16′06″N 1°10′15″E		1342737	Upload Photo	Q26626681
Priory End Priory End Cottage the Studio	II	Lee Priory			14 March 1980	TR2126656860; 51°16′05″N 1°10′14″E		1085615	Upload Photo	Q26373474
Lower Garrington Farmhouse	II	Lower Garrington Farm			14 March 1980	TR2067856312; 51°15′48″N 1°09′42″E		1336544	Upload Photo	Q26621028
Oasthouse at Lower Garrington Farm	II	Lower Garrington Farm			14 March 1980	TR2068456337; 51°15′48″N 1°09′43″E		1085608	Upload Photo	Q26373430
Old Britton Farm Cottage	II	Seaton			30 January 1967	TR2362758089; 51°16′41″N 1°12′18″E		1051662	Upload Photo	Q26303506
Memory Cottage	II	Seaton Road, Seaton			14 March 1980	TR2271058736; 51°17′03″N 1°11′32″E		1085617	Upload Photo	Q26373484
Riverside	II	Seaton Road, Seaton			11 May 1976	TR2262858713; 51°17′02″N 1°11′28″E		1372606	Upload Photo	Q26653707
Seatonden	II	Seaton Road, Seaton			14 March 1980	TR2270058679; 51°17′01″N 1°11′32″E		1085616	Upload Photo	Q26373479
Spicers Cottages	II	1, 2 and 3, The Street, Ickham			14 March 1980	TR2199158200; 51°16′47″N 1°10′54″E		1372607	Upload Photo	Q26653708
Victoria Cottage Woodcot	II	2 and 3, The Street, Ickham			14 March 1980	TR2218258005; 51°16′40″N 1°11′03″E		1049113	Upload Photo	Q26301166
Church View Cottage Willow Cottage	II	The Street, Ickham			14 March 1980	TR2214058030; 51°16′41″N 1°11′01″E		1051676	Upload Photo	Q26303519
Church of St John	I	The Street, Ickham	church building		30 January 1967	TR2221558140; 51°16′45″N 1°11′05″E		1085626	Church of St John More images	Q17529540
Court Farm Oast	II	The Street, Ickham			14 March 1980	TR2210358007; 51°16′40″N 1°10′59″E		1085620	Upload Photo	Q26373503
Escombe	II	The Street, Ickham			14 March 1980	TR2229957934; 51°16′38″N 1°11′09″E		1049119	Upload Photo	Q26301172
Glendale the Cottage	II	The Street, Ickham			14 March 1980	TR2216958013; 51°16′41″N 1°11′03″E		1085622	Upload Photo	Q26373514
Ickham Court	II	The Street, Ickham			14 March 1980	TR2216758138; 51°16′45″N 1°11′03″E		1336552	Upload Photo	Q26621036
Ickham Hall	II	The Street, Ickham Hall			30 January 1967	TR2221558015; 51°16′41″N 1°11′05″E		1049106	Upload Photo	Q26301160
Ickham Lodge	II	The Street, Ickham			30 January 1967	TR2226557961; 51°16′39″N 1°11′08″E		1049104	Upload Photo	Q26301158
Ickham Post Office Village Stores and Attached House	II	The Street, Ickham			14 March 1980	TR2219157990; 51°16′40″N 1°11′04″E		1085623	Upload Photo	Q26373519
K6 Telephone Kiosk Adjoining Farm Cottage	II	The Street			17 February 1989	TR2222157979; 51°16′39″N 1°11′05″E		1336621	Upload Photo	Q26621103
Oak Cottage Rectory Cottage	II	The Street, Ickham			30 January 1967	TR2200658191; 51°16′46″N 1°10′55″E		1085619	Upload Photo	Q26373497
Outbuilding to Ickham Hall	II	The Street, Ickham Hall			14 March 1980	TR2223858004; 51°16′40″N 1°11′06″E		1085625	Upload Photo	Q26373530
Ronella Snow Cottage	II	The Street, Ickham			14 March 1980	TR2215858019; 51°16′41″N 1°11′02″E		1085621	Upload Photo	Q26373507
The Green	II	The Street, Ickham			14 March 1980	TR2216758033; 51°16′41″N 1°11′03″E		1336551	Upload Photo	Q26621035
The Little Cottage	II	The Street, Ickham			14 March 1980	TR2227257947; 51°16′38″N 1°11′08″E		1085624	Upload Photo	Q26373524
The Treasury	II	The Street, Ickham			29 September 1952	TR2206058118; 51°16′44″N 1°10′57″E		1372608	Upload Photo	Q26653709
Upper Garrington Farmhouse	II	Upper Garrington Farm			14 March 1980	TR2049656210; 51°15′45″N 1°09′33″E		1336545	Upload Photo	Q26621029
Quaives Cottage	II	Wickham Lane, Ickham			14 March 1980	TR2194858540; 51°16′58″N 1°10′53″E		1085627	Upload Photo	Q26373535
The Old Rectory and St Johns House	II*	Wickham Lane, Ickham, CT3 1RD	clergy house		29 September 1952	TR2197658249; 51°16′48″N 1°10′53″E		1373865	The Old Rectory and St Johns House More images	Q17557292

== See also ==
- Grade I listed buildings in Kent
- Grade II* listed buildings in Kent

== Sources ==
- Newman, John (2013) [1969], Kent: North-East and East, The Buildings of England, New Haven and London: Yale University Press, ISBN 978-0-300-18506-5
