= Listed buildings in Hackington =

Historic structures in Kent, England

Hackington is a village and civil parish in the City of Canterbury district of Kent, England. It contains six grade II listed buildings that are recorded in the National Heritage List for England.

This list is based on the information retrieved online from Historic England.

== Key ==
Grade	Criteria
I	Buildings that are of exceptional interest
II*	Particularly important buildings of more than special interest
II	Buildings that are of special interest

== Listing ==
Name	Grade	Location	Type	Completed (Note: The date given is the date used by Historic England as significant for the initial building or that of an important part in the structure's description.)	Date designated	Grid ref. (Note: The grid reference is based on the British national grid reference system, sometimes known as OSGB36, used by the Ordnance Survey.) Geo-coordinates	Notes	Entry number (Note: The "List Entry Number" is a unique number assigned to each listed building and scheduled monument by Historic England.)	Image	Wikidata
Tyler Hill House	II	Calais Hill, Tyler Hill			14 March 1980	TR1399260736; 51°18′20″N 1°04′07″E		1085561	Upload Photo	Q26373187
Well Court	II	Fleets Lane, Tyler Hill			14 March 1980	TR1354661858; 51°18′57″N 1°03′47″E		1367423	Upload Photo	Q26648927
Frog Hall	II	Hackington Road, Frog Hall			30 January 1967	TR1418761731; 51°18′52″N 1°04′19″E		1336555	Upload Photo	Q26621039
Wayfair	II	9, Link Road			14 March 1980	TR1403360920; 51°18′26″N 1°04′10″E		1085631	Upload Photo	Q26373557
Taylors Cottages	II	12, 14 and 16, Link Road, Tyler Hill			9 March 1976	TR1403460873; 51°18′24″N 1°04′10″E		1085520	Upload Photo	Q26372968
Tyler Hill Cottage	II	Tyler Hill Road, Blean			14 March 1980	TR1393960853; 51°18′24″N 1°04′05″E		1085523	Upload Photo	Q26372978

== See also ==
- Grade I listed buildings in Kent
- Grade II* listed buildings in Kent

== Sources ==
- Newman, John (2013) [1969], Kent: North-East and East, The Buildings of England, New Haven and London: Yale University Press, ISBN 978-0-300-18506-5
