= Listed buildings in Chartham =

Historic structures in Kent, England

Chartham is a village and civil parish in the City of Canterbury district of Kent, England. It contains 57 listed buildings that are recorded in the National Heritage List for England. Of these one is grade I, three are grade II* and 53 are grade II.

This list is based on the information retrieved online from Historic England.

== Key ==
Grade	Criteria
I	Buildings that are of exceptional interest
II*	Particularly important buildings of more than special interest
II	Buildings that are of special interest

== Listing ==
Name	Grade	Location	Type	Completed (Note: The date given is the date used by Historic England as significant for the initial building or that of an important part in the structure's description.)	Date designated	Grid ref. (Note: The grid reference is based on the British national grid reference system, sometimes known as OSGB36, used by the Ordnance Survey.) Geo-coordinates	Notes	Entry number (Note: The "List Entry Number" is a unique number assigned to each listed building and scheduled monument by Historic England.)	Image	Wikidata
Dane Cottage	II				14 March 1980	TR0999453943; 51°14′46″N 1°00′27″E		1099917	Upload Photo	Q26392026
K6 Telephone Kiosk on Green	II				11 May 1989	TR1053155097; 51°15′22″N 1°00′57″E		1260425	Upload Photo	Q26551439
Perry Court	II				14 March 1980	TR1109853489; 51°14′29″N 1°01′23″E		1085713	Upload Photo	Q26373957
Underdown Cottages	II				30 January 1967	TR0988853955; 51°14′46″N 1°00′21″E		1099949	Upload Photo	Q26392056
Barn at Mystole Park Adjoining Stable House, Archway Lodge and Archway to the East	II	Archway Lodge And Archway To The East, Mystole, Mystole Park			30 January 1967	TR0945853678; 51°14′38″N 0°59′59″E		1085683	Upload Photo	Q26373806
Barn at Burnt House Farm Situated to North of Farmhouse	II	Ashford Road			14 March 1980	TR1067855299; 51°15′28″N 1°01′05″E		1085674	Upload Photo	Q26373767
Burnt House Farmhouse and the Oast House	II	Ashford Road			31 January 1967	TR1068455243; 51°15′27″N 1°01′05″E		1085673	Upload Photo	Q26373762
Chartham Corn Mill	II	Ashford Road			14 March 1980	TR0970355423; 51°15′34″N 1°00′15″E		1085672	Upload Photo	Q26373758
Dovecote at Burnt House Farm Situated to the East of the Barn	II	Ashford Road			14 March 1980	TR1071255308; 51°15′29″N 1°01′07″E		1336535	Upload Photo	Q17663765
Park House	II	Ashford Road			28 August 1976	TR1066055335; 51°15′30″N 1°01′04″E		1336534	Upload Photo	Q26621018
Shalmsford Bridge Manor	II	Ashford Road, Shalmsford Bridge			30 January 1967	TR0888554950; 51°15′20″N 0°59′32″E		1099925	Upload Photo	Q26392034
Garden Wall to the Orangery, at Mystole Park	II	At Mystole Park, Mystole, Mystole Park			14 March 1980	TR0947753608; 51°14′35″N 0°59′59″E		1100303	Upload Photo	Q26392404
The Orangery, at Mystole Park	II	At Mystole Park, Mystole, Mystole Park			14 March 1980	TR0950253618; 51°14′36″N 1°00′01″E		1085684	Upload Photo	Q26373811
Box Tree House	II	Bolts Hill			14 March 1980	TR1002054800; 51°15′13″N 1°00′30″E		1336536	Upload Photo	Q26621020
Cross Keys Public House	II	Bolts Hill, CT4 7JX			14 March 1980	TR0992654782; 51°15′13″N 1°00′25″E		1085675	Upload Photo	Q26373772
Deanery Cottage	II	Bolts Hill			17 October 1974	TR1009955037; 51°15′21″N 1°00′34″E		1085677	Upload Photo	Q26373777
Oast and Stables at Deanery Farm	II	Bolts Hill			25 July 1990	TR1011155079; 51°15′22″N 1°00′35″E		1085441	Upload Photo	Q26372577
The Deanery	II*	Bolts Hill			30 January 1967	TR1007255087; 51°15′22″N 1°00′33″E		1085676	Upload Photo	Q17557074
Chartham War Memorial	II	Church Lane	war memorial		5 November 2007	TR1064455083; 51°15′22″N 1°01′03″E		1392299	Chartham War Memorial More images	Q26671527
Denstead Farmhouse	II	Denstead Lane, Denstead Farm			30 January 1967	TR1013157600; 51°16′44″N 1°00′42″E		1336537	Upload Photo	Q26621021
Denstead Oast	II	Denstead Lane, Denstead Farm			14 March 1980	TR0990657747; 51°16′49″N 1°00′30″E		1085678	Upload Photo	Q26373783
1 and 2 Mount Cottage	II	1 and 2 Mount Cottage, Hatch Lane			14 March 1980	TR0993656590; 51°16′11″N 1°00′29″E		1336501	Upload Photo	Q26620989
Hatch Farmhouse	II	Hatch Lane, Chartham Hatch			14 March 1980	TR1009356236; 51°16′00″N 1°00′37″E		1336500	Upload Photo	Q26620988
Hatch House Sayers Court	II	Hatch Lane			14 March 1980	TR0995056485; 51°16′08″N 1°00′30″E		1085681	Upload Photo	Q26373800
Pilgrim's Cottage	II	Hatch Lane			14 March 1980	TR0990756568; 51°16′11″N 1°00′28″E		1348507	Upload Photo	Q26631883
Royal Oak Public House	II	Hatch Lane, Chartham Hatch, CT4 7LP			14 March 1980	TR1000556430; 51°16′06″N 1°00′33″E		1100325	Upload Photo	Q26392444
Horton Manor Chapel	II	Horton			30 January 1967	TR1148655195; 51°15′24″N 1°01′46″E		1085714	Upload Photo	Q26373960
Horton Manor House	II	Horton			29 June 1982	TR1145355224; 51°15′25″N 1°01′45″E		1255391	Upload Photo	Q26546975
Howfield Manor	II	Howfield Lane			29 September 1952	TR1174856085; 51°15′52″N 1°02′02″E		1100327	Upload Photo	Q26392447
Mystole Coach House	II*	Mystole, Mystole House			30 January 1967	TR0950553706; 51°14′39″N 1°00′01″E		1100332	Upload Photo	Q17557090
Mystole House South Mystole West Wing	II*	Mystole, Mystole House	architectural structure		29 September 1952	TR0952053752; 51°14′40″N 1°00′02″E		1085682	Mystole House South Mystole West Wing More images	Q17557078
Stable House, Archway Lodge and Archway	II	Mystole, Mystole Park			30 January 1967	TR0945253705; 51°14′39″N 0°59′58″E		1348494	Upload Photo	Q26631870
The Tetherings	II	Mystole, Mystole Park			30 January 1967	TR0947553734; 51°14′39″N 1°00′00″E		1336502	Upload Photo	Q26620990
Barn at Thruxted Farm	II	Penny Pot Lane, Thruxted			14 March 1980	TR1018153691; 51°14′37″N 1°00′36″E		1100304	Upload Photo	Q26392405
Thruxted Farmhouse	II	Penny Pot Lane, Thruxted			14 March 1980	TR1022653684; 51°14′37″N 1°00′38″E		1085685	Upload Photo	Q26373815
Well House at Thruxted Farm	II	Penny Pot Lane, Thruxted			14 March 1980	TR1021253673; 51°14′37″N 1°00′37″E		1085686	Upload Photo	Q26373821
The Old Bakery	II	1 and 2, Rattington Street			14 March 1980	TR1090454874; 51°15′14″N 1°01′16″E		1348524	Upload Photo	Q26631899
Riverview Cottage	II	2, Rattington Street, CT4 7JG			14 March 1980	TR1086854924; 51°15′16″N 1°01′14″E		1085691	Upload Photo	Q26373849
Evita Middleton and Cottage Adjoining to Left	II	5, Rattington Street, CT4 7JQ			14 March 1980	TR1088754873; 51°15′14″N 1°01′15″E		1347941	Upload Photo	Q26631361
Hope Cottage	II	Rattington Street			14 March 1980	TR1091854858; 51°15′14″N 1°01′16″E		1085687	Upload Photo	Q26373828
Rentain Cottage	II	Rattington Street			31 January 1967	TR1084854872; 51°15′14″N 1°01′13″E		1347906	Upload Photo	Q26631327
Rentain Farmhouse	II	Rattington Street			30 January 1967	TR1089854838; 51°15′13″N 1°01′15″E		1085688	Upload Photo	Q26373832
The Artichoke Inn	II	Rattington Street	pub		31 January 1967	TR1086954881; 51°15′15″N 1°01′14″E		1085689	The Artichoke Inn More images	Q26373839
Oast Cottage	II	Riverside			13 May 1976	TR1041555168; 51°15′25″N 1°00′51″E		1336503	Upload Photo	Q26620991
Numbers 1, 2 and 3 Barn Cottages	II	1, 2 and 3 Barn Cottages, Shalmsford Street			14 March 1980	TR0924954787; 51°15′14″N 0°59′50″E		1085690	Upload Photo	Q26373844
Numbers 4 and 5 Barn Cottages	II	4 and 5 Barn Cottages, Shalmsford Street			14 March 1980	TR0923554792; 51°15′14″N 0°59′49″E		1101456	Upload Photo	Q26394900
Shalmsford Farmhouse	II	Shalmsford Street			14 March 1980	TR0921454837; 51°15′15″N 0°59′48″E		1101492	Upload Photo	Q26394971
Rattington House	II	Stour Road			25 April 1977	TR1088254907; 51°15′16″N 1°01′15″E		1085692	Upload Photo	Q26373855
Willow Cottage	II	Stour Road			14 March 1980	TR1087154926; 51°15′16″N 1°01′14″E		1336504	Upload Photo	Q26620992
De L'angle House Petite De L'angle	II	1, 2 and 3, The Green			29 September 1952	TR1060755161; 51°15′24″N 1°01′01″E		1336499	Upload Photo	Q26620987
Bedford House	II	The Green			29 September 1952	TR1054855133; 51°15′23″N 1°00′58″E		1348504	Upload Photo	Q26631880
Church of St Mary	I	The Green	church building		30 January 1967	TR1068855074; 51°15′21″N 1°01′05″E		1100352	Church of St Mary More images	Q15978786
Tanthorn Cottage	II	The Green			14 March 1980	TR1055255081; 51°15′22″N 1°00′58″E		1085680	Upload Photo	Q26373794
The Forge	II	The Green			14 March 1980	TR1053555125; 51°15′23″N 1°00′57″E		1085679	Upload Photo	Q26373789
The King's Head Inn	II	The Green, CT4 7JW			30 January 1967	TR1050655100; 51°15′22″N 1°00′56″E		1100324	Upload Photo	Q26392441
4, the Square	II	4, The Square			14 March 1980	TR1086854906; 51°15′16″N 1°01′14″E		1347931	Upload Photo	Q26631351
Oast Houses at Thruxted Farm	II	Thruxted			5 September 1975	TR0995353946; 51°14′46″N 1°00′25″E		1336515	Upload Photo	Q26621001

== See also ==
- Grade I listed buildings in Kent
- Grade II* listed buildings in Kent

== Sources ==
- Newman, John (2013) [1969], Kent: North-East and East, The Buildings of England, New Haven and London: Yale University Press, ISBN 978-0-300-18506-5
