= 2023 Canterbury City Council election =

2023 English local election

- 4 May 2023

All 39 seats to Canterbury City Council 20 seats needed for a majority
- Turnout: 38.0%

	First party	Second party
Leader	Alan Baldock	Michael Dixey
Party	Labour	Liberal Democrats
Last election	10 seats, 29.4%	6 seats, 19.7%
Seats won	18	9
Seat change	▲8	▲3
Popular vote	29,825	17,935
Percentage	36.6%	22.0%
Swing	▲7.2%	▲2.3%
	Third party	Fourth party
Leader	Ben Fitter-Harding	Clare Turnbull
Party	Conservative	Green
Last election	23 seats, 35.4%	0 seats, 12.5%
Seats won	8	4
Seat change	▼15	▲4
Popular vote	19,867	11,350
Percentage	24.4%	13.9%
Swing	▼11.0%	▲1.4%
- Winner of each seat at the 2023 Canterbury City Council election
Leader before election
Ben Fitter-Harding
Conservative
No overall control
Leader after election
Alan Baldock
Labour
No overall control

The 2023 Canterbury City Council election took place on 4 May 2023 to elect members of Canterbury City Council in Kent, England. This was on the same day as other local elections in England.

The Conservatives held a majority on the council from 2005 until April 2023, less than a month before the election, when four Conservatives left the party to form the "Independent Serve to Lead Group".

The election saw the council remain under no overall control, but the Conservatives went from being the largest party to being the third largest party behind Labour and the Liberal Democrats. The leader of the council, Conservative councillor Ben Fitter-Harding, lost his seat. After the election a Labour and Liberal Democrat coalition formed to take control of the council, with Labour group leader Alan Baldock being appointed leader of the council at the subsequent annual council meeting on 17 May 2023.

== Summary ==
=== Election result ===
18	9	8	4
Labour	Lib Dems	Conservative	Green

2023 Canterbury City Council election
Party	Candidates	Seats	Gains	Losses	Net gain/loss	Seats %	Votes %	Votes	+/−
Labour	39	18	10	2	▲8	46.1	36.6	29,825	+7.2
Liberal Democrats	34	9	4	1	▲3	23.1	22.0	17,935	+2.3
Conservative	39	8	0	15	▼15	20.5	24.4	19,867	-11.0
Green	25	4	4	0	▲4	10.3	13.9	11,350	+1.4
Independent	6	0	0	0	Steady	0.0	2.8	2,259	+0.5
Reform	3	0	0	0	Steady	0.0	0.3	296	N/A

== Ward results ==
The Statement of Persons Nominated, which details the candidates standing in each ward, was released by Canterbury City Council following the close of nominations on 5 April 2023. The results for each ward were as follows:

Asterisks (*) denote incumbent councillors seeking re-election.

=== Barton ===
Barton (3 seats)
Party	Candidate	Votes	%	±%
Labour	Connie Nolan*	1,476	53.5	+18.2
Labour	Pat Edwards*	1,405	50.9	+15.5
Labour	Paul Prentice	1,257	45.6	+15.8
Conservative	Martin Antony Arch	718	26.0	+3.0
Conservative	Scott Collins	605	21.9	–0.2
Conservative	Mary Cawston Streater	555	20.1	–1.5
Liberal Democrats	Graham Duplock	397	14.4	–15.0
Liberal Democrats	George Fenwick Metcalfe	374	13.6	–14.4
Liberal Democrats	Julia Dorothea Zoettl	345	12.5	–12.3
Green	Delia Hazrati	320	11.6	–10.1
Green	Mary Claire Smith	297	10.8	N/A
Green	Nathan James Tough	227	8.2	N/A
Majority		539	19.5	
Turnout		2,759	37	+1.3
Rejected ballots		15	0.5	
Registered electors		7,555		
Labour hold				
Labour hold				
Labour hold				

=== Beltinge ===
Beltinge (2 seats)
Party	Candidate	Votes	%	±%
Conservative	Ian Stockley*	944	47.3	–2.9
Conservative	Jeanette Stockley*	940	47.1	–2.2
Labour	Teresa Pearce	454	22.8	+6.0
Labour	Christine Wheeldon	425	21.3	+5.3
Green	Nicholas Gadsby	417	20.9	–1.9
Green	Roger Everatt	253	12.7	N/A
Liberal Democrats	Ann Anderson	200	10.0	–10.8
Liberal Democrats	Paul Smith	156	7.8	–2.5
Majority		486	24.4	
Turnout		1,994	34	+2.0
Rejected ballots		14	0.7	
Registered electors		5,913		
Conservative hold				
Conservative hold				

=== Blean Forest ===
Blean Forest (3 seats)
Party	Candidate	Votes	%	±%
Liberal Democrats	Alex Ricketts*	1,214	60.5	+28.9
Liberal Democrats	Steph Jupe	1,035	51.6	+22.4
Liberal Democrats	Daniel Smith*	944	47.1	+17.8
Labour	Nicola May	444	22.1	–1.4
Green	Alexander Hilton	398	19.8	–2.2
Labour	Howard Needham	383	19.1	–3.1
Labour	Sam Newman	367	18.3	–2.4
Conservative	James Somerville-Meikle	329	16.4	–13.7
Conservative	Gary Ovenden	299	14.9	–12.7
Conservative	Timothy Streater	281	14.0	–8.4
Majority		500	24.9	
Turnout		2,006	35	±0.0
Rejected ballots		6	0.3	
Registered electors		4,155		
Liberal Democrats hold				
Liberal Democrats gain from Conservative				
Liberal Democrats hold				

=== Chartham and Stone Street ===
Chartham and Stone Street (2 seats)
Party	Candidate	Votes	%	±%
Labour Co-op	Alister Brady	1,169	47.9	+20.3
Labour Co-op	Mike Bland	1,153	47.3	+20.4
Conservative	Laura Hobbs	593	24.3	–13.0
Conservative	Elliot Curryer	567	23.2	–12.3
Liberal Democrats	Yvonne Hawkins	485	19.9	+2.9
Liberal Democrats	James Galloway	407	16.7	+5.2
Green	Greg Lawrence	338	13.9	–7.9
Majority		560	23.0	
Turnout		2,440	43	±0.0
Rejected ballots		12	0.5	
Registered electors		5,667		
Labour Co-op gain from Conservative				
Labour Co-op gain from Conservative				

=== Chestfield ===
Chestfield (2 seats)
Party	Candidate	Votes	%	±%
Liberal Democrats	Peter Old	1,381	54.7	+37.4
Liberal Democrats	James Flanagan	1,358	53.8	+36.6
Conservative	Steve Bailey	649	25.7	–29.2
Conservative	Benjamin Fitter-Harding	489	19.4	–34.9
Labour	Philippa Langton	349	13.8	–2.6
Labour	Sammy Roberts	256	10.1	–2.9
Reform	Adrian Kibble	122	4.8	N/A
Independent	Joseph Egerton	106	4.2	N/A
Reform	Leslie Lilley	101	4.0	N/A
Majority		709	28.1	
Turnout		2,523	45	+10.0
Rejected ballots		4	0.2	
Registered electors		5,664		
Liberal Democrats gain from Conservative				
Liberal Democrats gain from Conservative				

=== Gorrell ===
Gorrell (3 seats)
Party	Candidate	Votes	%	±%
Green	Clare Turnbull*	2,045	57.5	+18.8
Labour	Chris Cornell*	1,643	46.2	+3.9
Green	Steven Wheeler	1,492	41.9	+15.2
Labour	Valerie Kenny*	1,392	39.1	+0.1
Labour	Dan Allen	1,293	36.4	–5.9
Green	Tom Sharp	1,215	34.2	+15.2
Conservative	Georgia Bills	434	12.2	–14.3
Conservative	Janet Newcombe	426	12.0	–9.1
Conservative	Penelope Wilson	405	11.4	–9.2
Majority		100	2.8	
Turnout		3,557	43	+2.0
Rejected ballots		17	0.5	
Registered electors		8,357		
Green gain from Labour				
Labour hold				
Green gain from Labour				

=== Greenhill ===
Greenhill
Party	Candidate	Votes	%	±%
Conservative	Dan Watkins*	421	46.7	+0.5
Labour	Andy Davidson	350	38.8	+13.9
Liberal Democrats	Valerie Ainscough	130	14.4	N/A
Majority		71	7.9	
Turnout		909	27	±0.0
Rejected ballots		7	0.8	
Registered electors		3,346		
Conservative hold		Swing	▼6.7	

=== Herne & Broomfield ===
Herne & Broomfield (2 seats)
Party	Candidate	Votes	%	±%
Conservative	Robert Jones	812	43.6	–6.2
Conservative	Joe Howes*	722	38.8	–16.0
Liberal Democrats	Derek Maslin	446	24.0	+0.6
Labour	Chris Gibson	421	22.6	+5.2
Labour	Karen Douglas	419	22.5	+8.5
Liberal Democrats	Brian McHenry	291	15.6	+3.1
Independent	Anne Dekker*	197	10.6	N/A
Green	Alex Stevens	169	9.1	–6.4
Green	Tom Williams	117	6.3	N/A
Majority		276	14.8	
Turnout		1,862	28	+1.0
Rejected ballots		10	0.5	
Registered electors		6,751		
Conservative hold				
Conservative hold				

=== Heron ===
Heron (3 seats)
Party	Candidate	Votes	%	±%
Labour	Tom Mellish	1,079	37.3	+12.0
Conservative	Liz Harvey	1,037	35.8	–8.3
Conservative	David Thomas*	1,030	35.6	–4.2
Labour	Emma Wright	1,023	35.3	+13.1
Labour	Fred Pearce	1,019	35.2	+13.9
Conservative	Jane Thomas	978	33.8	–2.9
Green	Michael Vince	656	22.7	–1.0
Liberal Democrats	Margaret Flaherty	600	20.7	+8.0
Liberal Democrats	Martin Ashton	329	11.4	–0.5
Liberal Democrats	Latchmi Old	229	7.9	–3.1
Majority		7	0.2	
Turnout		2,896	30	+1.0
Rejected ballots		24	0.8	
Registered electors		9,655		
Labour gain from Conservative				
Conservative hold				
Conservative hold				

=== Little Stour & Adisham ===
Little Stour & Adisham
Party	Candidate	Votes	%	±%
Liberal Democrats	Lee Castle	1,161	72.0	+45.5
Conservative	Hilary Scott	310	19.2	–22.3
Labour	Paul O'Neil	142	8.8	–8.4
Majority		851	52.8	N/A
Turnout		1,625	50	+6.0
Rejected ballots		9	0.6	
Registered electors		3,274		
Liberal Democrats gain from Conservative		Swing	▲33.9	

=== Nailbourne ===
Nailbourne
Party	Candidate	Votes	%	±%
Liberal Democrats	Michael Sole*	1,341	84.0	+34.1
Conservative	Cerise Harriss	170	10.6	–25.1
Labour	Mike Holman	86	5.4	–1.5
Majority		1,171	73.3	
Turnout		1,607	51	–2.0
Rejected ballots		7	0.4	
Registered electors		3,130		
Liberal Democrats hold		Swing	▲29.6	

=== Northgate ===
Northgate (2 seats)
Party	Candidate	Votes	%	±%
Labour Co-op	Alan Baldock*	682	64.1	+9.8
Labour Co-op	Jean Butcher*	682	64.1	+14.4
Green	Martin Baker	177	16.6	+0.6
Conservative	Eamon O'Reilly	161	15.1	–7.6
Conservative	Louie Ralph	156	14.7	–6.3
Liberal Democrats	Mark Leggatt	97	9.1	–3.6
Liberal Democrats	Liz Pope	93	8.7	–0.8
Majority		505	47.5	
Turnout		1,064	28	±0.0
Rejected ballots		10	0.9	
Registered electors		3,787		
Labour Co-op hold				
Labour Co-op hold				

=== Reculver ===
Reculver
Party	Candidate	Votes	%	±%
Conservative	Rachel Carnac*	534	49.1	–8.2
Labour	Barbara Ayling	321	29.5	+6.6
Green	Stephen Peckham	135	12.4	+3.5
Liberal Democrats	John Bowley	97	8.9	–2.1
Majority		213	19.6	
Turnout		1,092	34	+1.0
Rejected ballots		4	0.4	
Registered electors		3,237		
Conservative hold		Swing	▼7.4	

=== Seasalter ===
Seasalter (2 seats)
Party	Candidate	Votes	%	±%
Labour	Naomi Smith	927	36.6	+12.6
Labour	Charlotte Cornell	826	32.6	+8.9
Independent	Ashley Clark*	825	32.5	N/A
Independent	Colin Spooner*	789	31.1	N/A
Conservative	Stephen Spencer	675	26.6	–27.6
Conservative	Graham Wells	657	25.9	–26.0
Liberal Democrats	Margaret Mackechnie	114	4.5	–5.1
Liberal Democrats	Michael Dowling	113	4.5	–4.3
Majority		1	0.0	
Turnout		2,535	41	+3.0
Rejected ballots		10	0.4	
Registered electors		6,156		
Labour gain from Conservative				
Labour gain from Conservative				

=== St Stephens ===
St Stephens (2 seats)
Party	Candidate	Votes	%	±%
Labour Co-op	Mel Dawkins	1,167	59.8	+28.3
Labour Co-op	Elizabeth Carr-Ellis	1,057	54.2	+20.3
Liberal Democrats	Christopher Palmer	366	18.8	–2.4
Green	Gillian Everatt	314	16.1	–2.9
Liberal Democrats	Janet Capper	288	14.8	–6.3
Conservative	Louie McNamara	273	14.0	–21.0
Conservative	Owen Sweetman	266	13.6	–17.1
Majority		691	35.4	
Turnout		1,951	39	–1.0
Rejected ballots		17	0.9	
Registered electors		4,975		
Labour Co-op gain from Conservative				
Labour Co-op hold				

=== Sturry ===
Sturry (2 seats)
Party	Candidate	Votes	%	±%
Labour	Harry McKenzie	783	37.5	+12.2
Labour	Keji Moses	658	31.5	+10.8
Conservative	Louise Harvey-Quirke*	656	31.4	–6.2
Conservative	Georgina Glover*	623	29.8	–5.4
Green	Peter Campbell	418	20.0	–2.1
Green	Nicole David	270	12.9	–7.7
Independent	Ken Dekker	173	8.3	N/A
Independent	Heather Taylor	169	8.1	–14.0
Liberal Democrats	Eleodor Berceanu	136	6.5	N/A
Liberal Democrats	Helen Sole	132	6.3	N/A
Majority		2	0.1	
Turnout		2,090	33	±0.0
Rejected ballots		3	0.1	
Registered electors		6,271		
Labour gain from Conservative				
Labour gain from Conservative				

=== Swalecliffe ===
Swalecliffe
Party	Candidate	Votes	%	±%
Green	Keith Bothwell	769	55.3	+39.4
Conservative	Mark Dance*	370	26.6	–19.7
Labour	Alex Wescomb	178	12.8	–18.0
Reform	Edna Wallace	73	5.3	N/A
Majority		399	28.7	
Turnout		1,397	44	+7.0
Rejected ballots		6	0.4	
Registered electors		3,206		
Green gain from Conservative		Swing	▲29.6	

=== Tankerton ===
Tankerton
Party	Candidate	Votes	%	±%
Labour	Simon Warley	713	48.8	+17.2
Conservative	Neil Baker*	560	38.4	+4.0
Liberal Democrats	Nick Parry	187	12.8	–21.2
Majority		153	10.5	N/A
Turnout		1,469	51	+5.0
Rejected ballots		7	0.5	
Registered electors		2,857		
Labour gain from Conservative		Swing	▲6.6	

=== West Bay ===
West Bay
Party	Candidate	Votes	%	±%
Green	Andrew Harvey	599	56.0	+39.9
Conservative	Grace Paget	339	31.7	–16.8
Labour	Brendan Little	131	12.3	–11.3
Majority		260	24.3	N/A
Turnout		1,076	34	+5.0
Rejected ballots		7	0.7	
Registered electors		3,170		
Green gain from Conservative		Swing	▲28.4	

=== Westgate ===
Westgate (2 seats)
Party	Candidate	Votes	%	±%
Labour	Pip Hazelton*	975	46.5	+10.0
Liberal Democrats	Michael Dixey*	936	44.7	+4.4
Labour	Rosanna Jackson	802	38.3	+3.6
Liberal Democrats	Richard Parkinson	636	30.3	–1.5
Green	Benjamin Grillet	321	15.3	+5.3
Conservative	Rosemary Doyle	196	9.4	–0.9
Conservative	John Hippisley	163	7.8	–1.9
Majority		134	6.4	
Turnout		2,096	38	–3.0
Rejected ballots		6	0.3	
Registered electors		5,565		
Labour hold				
Liberal Democrats hold				

=== Wincheap ===
Wincheap (2 seats)
Party	Candidate	Votes	%	±%
Labour Co-op	Dane Buckman	1,027	41.7	+11.5
Liberal Democrats	Roben Franklin	971	39.4	–8.5
Liberal Democrats	Amina Inua	946	38.4	±0.0
Labour Co-op	Paul Todd	891	36.1	+9.1
Green	Julie Ellis	403	16.3	–1.3
Conservative	Phil Collins	276	11.2	–2.9
Conservative	Ronald McWilliams	248	10.1	–3.6
Majority		25	1.0	
Turnout		2,465	39	–3.0
Rejected ballots		6	0.2	
Registered electors		6,266		
Labour Co-op gain from Liberal Democrats				
Liberal Democrats hold				

== Changes 2023–2027 ==
- The Liberal Democrats left the Labour–Liberal Democrat coalition in May 2026 after a WhatsApp message from council leader Alan Baldock asking Liberal Democrat councillors not to vote against key planning applications, leaving Labour running a minority administration. Pip Hazelton was appointed deputy leader.
- In July 2026 the government confirmed that Kent and Medway would be reorganised into four unitary authorities from April 2028, replacing Canterbury City Council. In September 2026 the reorganisation was paused, with the May 2027 elections to go ahead on existing council boundaries.

=== By-elections ===
==== Gorrell ====
The Gorrell by-election was triggered by Green councillor Steve Wheeler stepping down.

Gorrell by-election: 6 March 2025
Party	Candidate	Votes	%	±%
Green	Stuart Heaver	1,210	49.5	–0.1
Labour	Valerie Kenny	570	23.3	–16.6
Reform	Babychan Thomas	423	17.3	N/A
Conservative	Janet Newcombe	179	7.3	–3.2
Liberal Democrats	Nick Parry	64	2.6	N/A
Majority		640	26.2	N/A
Turnout		2,453	28.7	–14.3
Rejected ballots		5	0.2	
Registered electors		8,551		
Green hold		Swing	▲8.3	

==== Herne & Broomfield ====
The Herne & Broomfield by-election was triggered by the resignation of Conservative councillor Joe Howes for health reasons.

Herne & Broomfield by-election: 6 March 2025
Party	Candidate	Votes	%	±%
Conservative	Grace Paget	557	40.7	+1.0
Reform	Mark Mulvihill	473	34.6	N/A
Labour	Lawrence Coomber	196	14.3	–6.3
Liberal Democrats	Derek Maslin	102	7.5	–14.3
Green	Peter Campbell	41	3.0	–5.3
Majority		84	6.1	N/A
Turnout		1,373	20.1	–7.9
Rejected ballots		4	0.3	
Registered electors		6,837		
Conservative hold				

==== St Stephen's ====
The St Stephen's by-election was triggered by the resignation of Labour councillor Elizabeth Carr-Ellis in January 2025, who moved to Scotland to be closer to family.

St Stephen's by-election: 6 March 2025
Party	Candidate	Votes	%	±%
Labour	Beth Forrester	628	47.0	–8.0
Reform	Colin Spooner	245	18.3	N/A
Liberal Democrats	Christopher Palmer	220	16.5	–0.8
Conservative	Arjan Taylor	128	9.6	–3.3
Green	Jessie Millner	116	8.7	–6.1
Majority		383	28.6	N/A
Turnout		1,342	26.4	–12.6
Rejected ballots		5	0.4	
Registered electors		5,077		
Labour hold				

==== Wincheap ====
The Wincheap by-election was triggered by the resignation of Liberal Democrat councillor Roben Franklin.

Wincheap by-election: 13 November 2025
Party	Candidate	Votes	%	±%
Green	Peter Campbell	842	39.1	+24.0
Liberal Democrats	Guy Meurice	518	24.1	−12.2
Reform	Colin Spooner	351	16.3	N/A
Labour	Jasmin Dallos-Foreman	276	12.8	−25.6
Conservative	Elliot Curryer	166	7.7	−2.6
Majority		324	15.0	N/A
Turnout		2,163	33.27	–5.7
Rejected ballots		7	0.3	
Registered electors		6,501		
Green gain from Liberal Democrats		Swing	▲18.1	
