= Nackington =

Village in Kent, England

Coordinates: 51.2497°N 1.0888°E

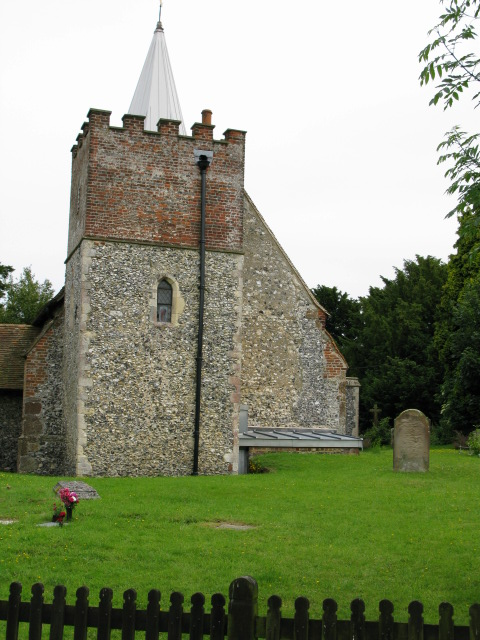
- St Mary's church

- Location within Kent
- Civil parish: Lower Hardres and Nackington
- District: City of Canterbury
- Shire county: Kent
- Region: South East
- Country: England
- Sovereign state: United Kingdom
- Post town: Canterbury
- Postcode district: CT4
- Police: Kent
- Fire: Kent
- Ambulance: South East Coast

Nackington is an English village and former civil parish, now in the parish of Lower Hardres and Nackington, south of Canterbury in the Canterbury district, in the county of Kent. The 12th century church is dedicated to St Mary. In 1931 the parish had a population of 80.

== History ==
On 1 April 1934 the parish of was merged into "Lower Hardres" and on 1 April 2019 the new parish was renamed to "Lower Hardres and Nackington".
