= Upper Hardres =

Village in Kent, England

Coordinates: 51.2152°N 1.0811°E

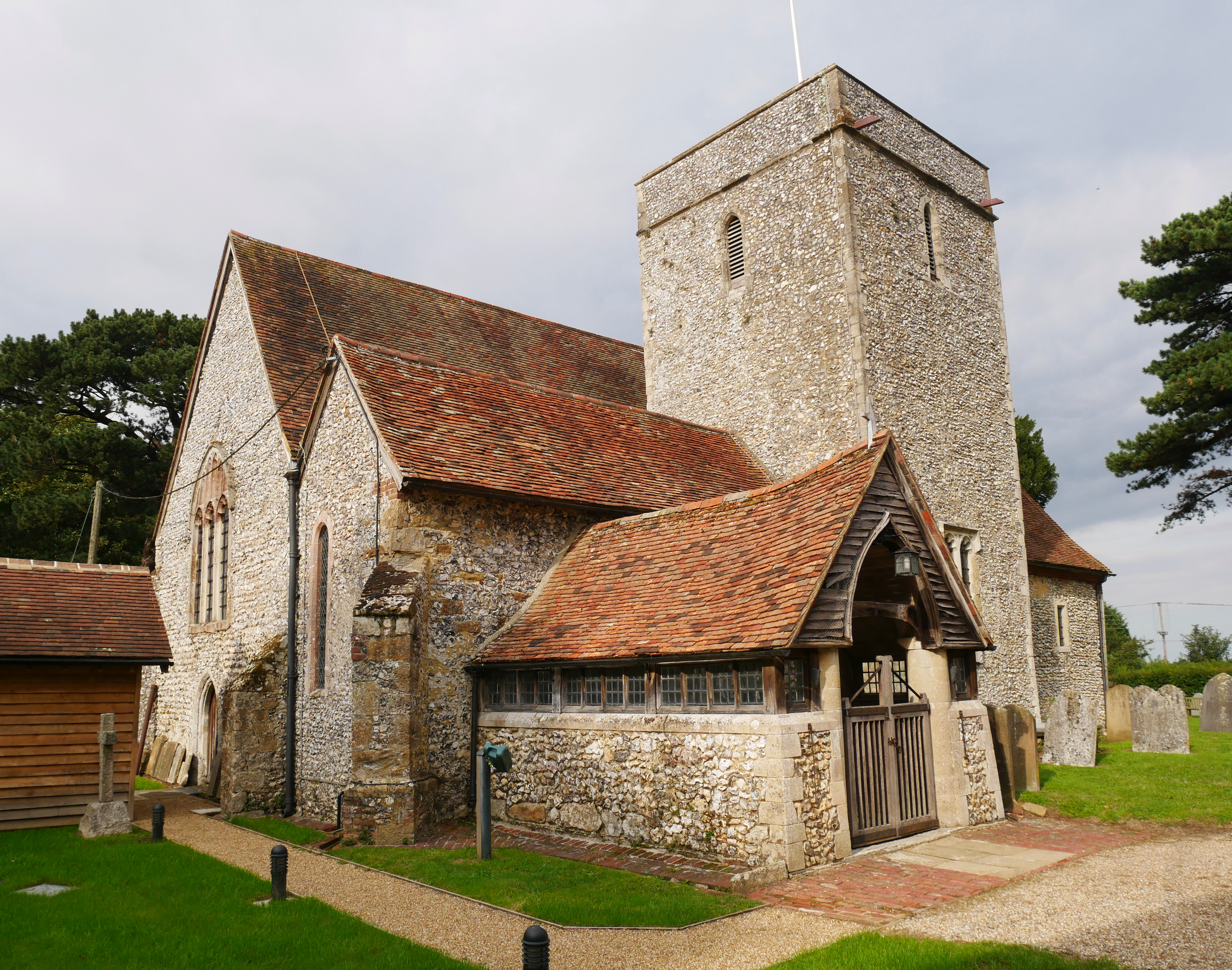
- The medieval Church of St Peter and St Paul in Upper Hardres

- Location within Kent
- Area: 8.11 km^{2} (3.13 sq mi)
- Population: 385 (Civil Parish 2011)
  - Density: 47/km^{2} (120/sq mi)
- OS grid reference: TR152507
- Civil parish: Upper Hardres
- District: City of Canterbury
- Shire county: Kent
- Region: South East
- Country: England
- Sovereign state: United Kingdom
- Post town: CANTERBURY
- Postcode district: CT4
- Dialling code: 01227
- Police: Kent
- Fire: Kent
- Ambulance: South East Coast
- UK Parliament: Canterbury

Upper Hardres /hɑːrdz/ is a village and civil parish in the City of Canterbury, in the district of Kent, England.

The name of the Hardres family is perpetuated in the twin villages of Upper Hardres and Lower Hardres (pronounced 'hards'), on the Roman road, Stone Street, south-west of the city of Canterbury. The family owned the area for 700 years after the Norman Conquest. It is said that Thomas Hardres, who was knighted for his valor at the Siege of Boulogne in 1544, brought back the town gates and erected them at Upper Hardres, though there is little evidence of their existence today.

== See also ==
- Listed buildings in Upper Hardres
