= Petham =

Village in Kent, England

Coordinates: 51.2229°N 1.0471°E

- Location within Kent
- Area: 13.61 km^{2} (5.25 sq mi)
- Population: 708 (Civil Parish 2011)
  - Density: 52/km^{2} (130/sq mi)
- OS grid reference: TR127515
- Civil parish: Petham
- District: City of Canterbury
- Shire county: Kent
- Region: South East
- Country: England
- Sovereign state: United Kingdom
- Post town: CANTERBURY
- Postcode district: CT4
- Dialling code: 01227
- Police: Kent
- Fire: Kent
- Ambulance: South East Coast
- UK Parliament: Canterbury

Petham is a rural village and civil parish in the North Downs, and is five miles south of Canterbury in Kent, South East England.

== History ==
The Manor of Petham was given in 1036 to the Priory of Christ Church by Halfdan Ragnarsson. The settlement is featured in the Domesday Book and was part of the hundred of Petham. Within the Hundred was Swarling, and the recorded population was 33.5 households. In 1086, the lord were the Archbishop of Canterbury, Godric the Steward and Nigel. During the Peasants’ revolt of 1381, seven people of the Hundred of Petham were indicted for rebellion, three of which were women. During the revolt, Henry Aleyn and John Colyn killed John Tyece in Canterbury and burnt the Custumal of Petham.

The Deppdane Chantry was built in the 15th century, and later extended with a two-storey, timber-framed addition in 1638. During 1779, Swarling Oast was constructed. In 1841, Duke’s Head pub first opened and later Chequers Inn in 1843. On the 28th September 1939, a Defiant N1569 was forced to make a landing at Court Lodge Farm in Petham after damage from combat with a Me109s of JG26. At the western edge of Denge Wood, the 90 Field Regiment Royal Artillery established a gun emplacement. However, it was later reconnoitred in June 1940.

== Natural History ==
The natural landscape character is that of North downs that sits on upper chalk. However, There is a mixed range of geological drift coming from sand and gravel. The area is designated as a Biodiversity Opportunity Area with the opportunity for chalk scarp woodlands.

== Amenities ==
Petham is a rural area, with 9 bus stops on routes 8 and 620. Registered as a charity, Petham has a village hall that hosts events and first opened in September 2005. Petham Primary School, which previously opened as a National school for boys and girls in 1830, is the local primary school of the area. The primary school temporarily closed in June 2013, and it is unclear if it still remains open. Dotted around the area are 3 hotels: Kent Downs Cottage, South Wootton House and Stable Lodge. From a narrow path uphill, there is a small playground. At a distance from the main village, there is a nearby garden center.

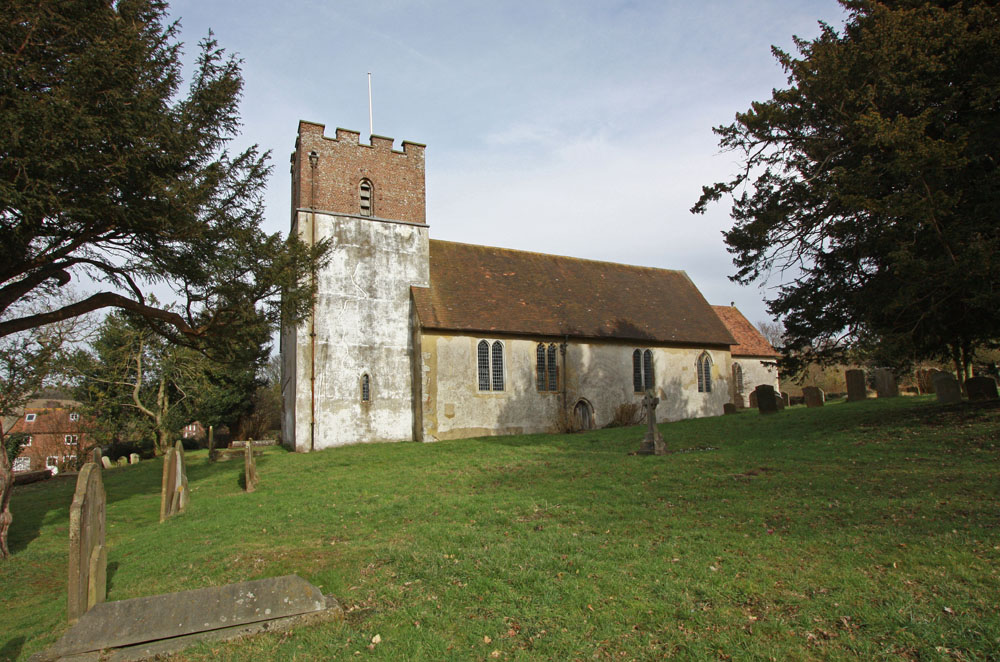

Religious Sites

The village church is All Saints, Petham and is Grade I listed. The church was built around 1287, though it possibly sits on the site of an earlier church mentioned in the Doomsday book. The oldest areas of the church is at the north Norman wall of the nave. The Vicarage was first endowed in 1226. During the late 12th century, the nave was extended and a tower was built alongside. Between 1561 to 1585 Johannes Armetrydinge served as the Perpetual Vicar. A top portion of the tower was added in 1760 for six church bells. Some restorations were completed in 1857. A war memorial for the first world war was built in the church in 1919. A fire on the 28th March 1922 resulted in the nave and south aisle roofs being destroyed and an appeal was later made to help fund for the restoration. In 1923, work was done on the church such as extending it westward, placing a new organ, choir stalla, new bells, pulpits and chairs. Electricty was first installed in the church in 1947.
