= City of Canterbury =

Local government district in Kent, England

Coordinates: 51.28°N 1.08°E

- Non-metropolitan district, borough, city
- Canterbury
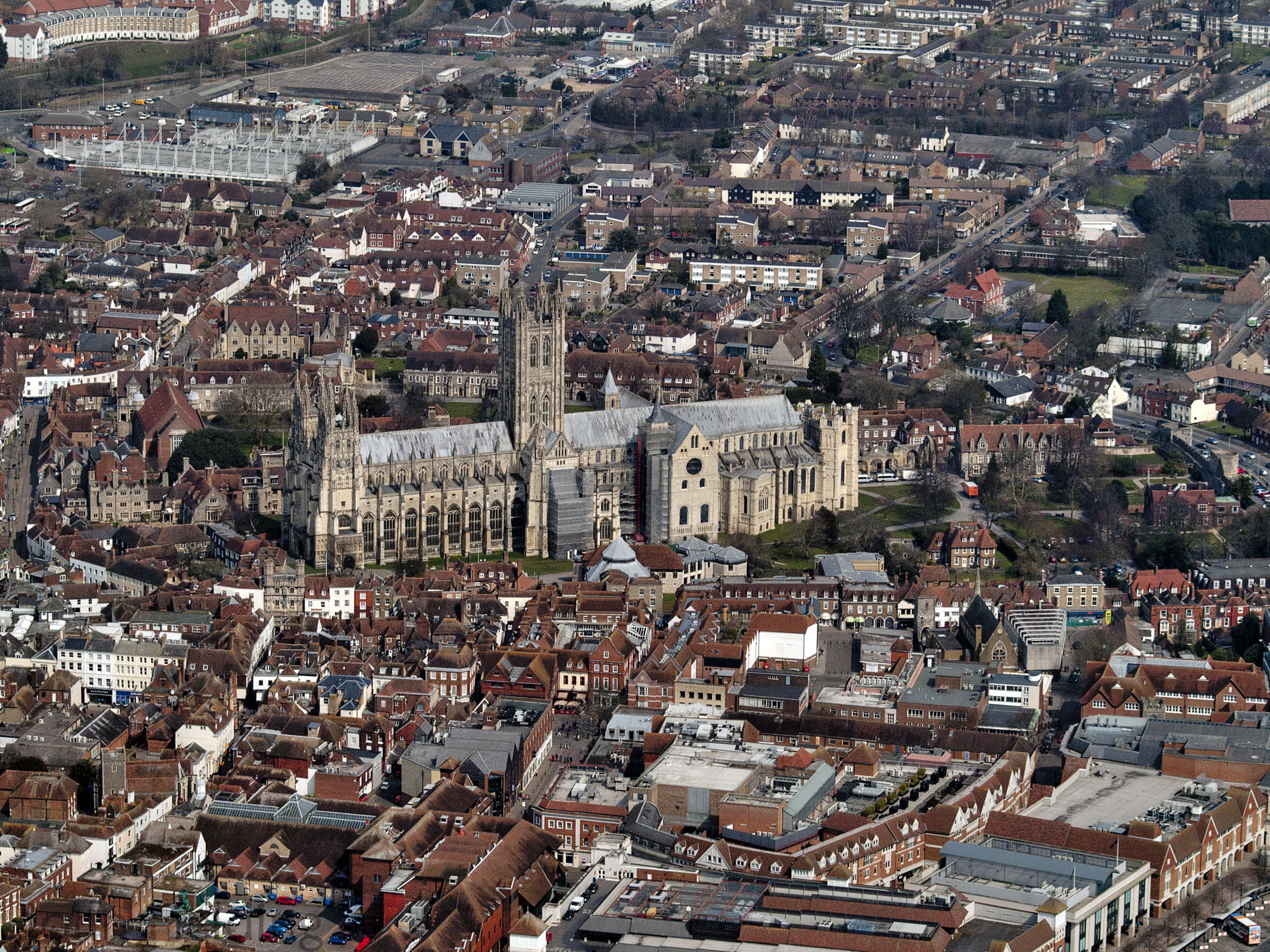
- Aerial view of Canterbury Cathedral and the surrounding area
- Interactive map of City of Canterbury
- Sovereign state: United Kingdom
- Country: England
- Region: South East England
- Non-metropolitan county: Kent
- Status: Non-metropolitan district, Borough, City
- Admin HQ: Canterbury
- Incorporated: 1 April 1974

Government
  - Type: Non-metropolitan district council
  - Body: Canterbury City Council
  - MPs: Rosie Duffield; Roger Gale

Area
  - Total: 119.24 sq mi (308.84 km^{2})
  - Rank: 117th (of 296)

Population (2024)
  - Total: 162,100
  - Rank: 134th (of 296)
  - Density: 1,359/sq mi (524.9/km^{2})

Ethnicity (2021)
  - Ethnic groups: List: 89.2% White; 4.1% Asian; 2.7% Mixed; 2.5% Black; 1.5% other

Religion (2021)
  - Religion: List: 46.6% Christianity; 42% no religion; 7% not stated; 1.8% Islam; 0.8% Hinduism; 0.7% other; 0.6% Buddhism; 0.2% Judaism; 0.2% Sikhism
- Time zone: UTC0 (GMT)
  - Summer (DST): UTC+1 (BST)
- ONS code: 29UC (ONS); E07000106 (GSS)
- OS grid reference: TR145575
- Click the map for an interactive fullscreen view

Canterbury (/ˈkæntərbəri/ KAN-tər-bər-ee or /-bɛri/ -berr-ee), also known as the City of Canterbury, is a local government district with city status in Kent, England. It is named after its largest settlement, Canterbury, where the council is based. The district also includes the towns of Fordwich, Herne Bay and Whitstable, along with numerous villages and surrounding rural areas. Parts of the district lie within the designated Area of Outstanding Natural Beauty of the Kent Downs.

The neighbouring districts (clockwise from east) are Thanet, Dover, Folkestone and Hythe, Ashford and Swale, all of which are also in Kent. To the north the district has a coast onto the North Sea.

== History ==
Canterbury itself was an ancient borough, which had held city status from time immemorial. The earliest known charter was issued by Henry II (reigned 1154–1189). A subsequent charter in 1448 gave the city the right to appoint a mayor. Another in 1461 gave the city the right to appoint its own sheriff, making it a county corporate, independent from the jurisdiction of the Sheriff of Kent. When elected county councils were established in 1889, Canterbury's independence was maintained by making it a county borough, independent from the new Kent County Council. Although administratively independent, Canterbury was still deemed part of Kent for the purposes of lieutenancy.

The modern district was created on 1 April 1974 under the Local Government Act 1972, covering the area of four former districts, which were all abolished at the same time:

- Bridge-Blean Rural District
- Canterbury County Borough
- Herne Bay Urban District
- Whitstable Urban District

The Bridge-Blean Rural District entirely surrounded the old city; the urban districts occupied the coastal area to the north. The new district was named Canterbury after its largest settlement. The district is a non-metropolitan district, with Kent County Council providing county-level services to the area. The district was awarded borough status from its creation, allowing the chair of the council to take the title of mayor, continuing Canterbury's series of mayors dating back to 1448. Canterbury's city status was extended to cover the whole of the new borough.

In 1988 the position of mayor was given the honorific title of lord mayor. The council continues to appoint a ceremonial sheriff; the sheriff no longer has any judicial functions, but the title is today taken by the deputy chair of the council.

Under current local government reorganisation plans, all district councils in Kent, as well as the county council, will be abolished in 2028, with the district becoming part of a new East Kent unitary authority.

== Governance ==
Canterbury City Council

History
- Founded: 1 April 1974

Leadership
- Lord Mayor: Alister Brady, Labour since 13 May 2026
- Leader: Alan Baldock, Labour since 17 May 2023
- Joint Chief Executives: Peter Davies; Suzi Wakeham since 1 January 2025

Structure
- Seats: 39
- Political groups: Administration (18) Labour (18) Other parties (21) Conservative (8) Liberal Democrats (9) Green (4) Independent (1)

Elections
- Last election: 4 May 2023

Meeting place
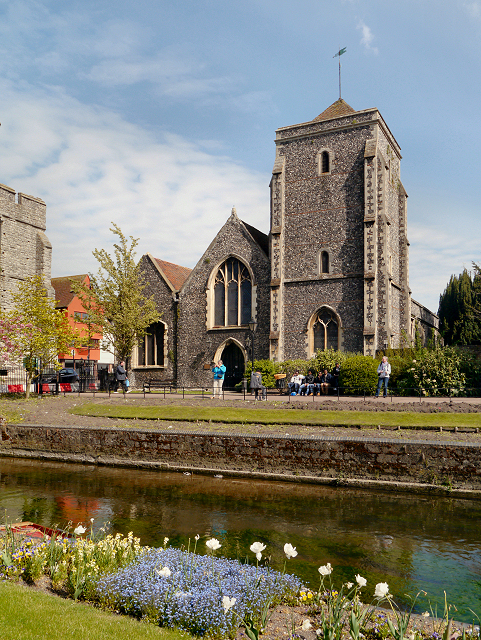
- Guildhall, St Peter's Place, Canterbury, CT1 2DB

Website
- www.canterbury.gov.uk

Canterbury City Council provides district-level services. County-level services are provided by Kent County Council. The more rural parts of the district are covered by civil parishes, which form a third tier of local government for their areas.

=== Political control ===
The council has been under no overall control since April 2023. Following the May 2023 elections a Labour and Liberal Democrat coalition was formed to run the council, led by Labour councillor Alan Baldock. The coalition broke down in May 2026, since when Labour have been running the council as a minority administration.

Political control of the council since the 1974 reforms has been as follows:

Party in control	Years
Conservative	1974–1991
No overall control	1991–2005
Conservative	2005–2023
No overall control	2023–present

=== Leadership ===
The role of lord mayor in Canterbury is largely ceremonial. Since 2002 the council has formally appointed a leader of the council to provide political leadership; the chair of the policy committee was sometimes called the leader prior to 2002. The leaders since 2002 have been:

Councillor	Party	From	To
Alex Perkins	Liberal Democrats	8 May 2002	11 May 2005
Harry Cragg	Conservative	11 May 2005	May 2007
John Gilbey	Conservative	16 May 2007	May 2015
Simon Cook	Conservative	20 May 2015	May 2019
Rob Thomas	Conservative	22 May 2019	Sep 2020
Ben Fitter-Harding	Conservative	10 Sep 2020	May 2023
Alan Baldock	Labour	17 May 2023	

=== Compositions ===
Following the 2023 election, and subsequent by-elections and changes of allegiance up to July 2026, the composition of the council was:

Party	Councillors
Labour	18
Liberal Democrats	8
Conservative	8
Green	4
Independent	1
Total	39

=== Elections ===
Since the last full review of boundaries in 2015 the council has comprised 39 councillors representing 21 wards with each ward electing one, two or three councillors. Elections are held every four years.

=== Premises ===
Council meetings are held at Canterbury Guildhall at the corner of St Peter's Place and St Peter's Street, adjoining the Westgate. The building was formerly the Church of the Holy Cross. It had been commissioned by Archbishop Simon Sudbury and was completed before his death in 1381. After the church was declared redundant and deconsecrated in 1972, it was acquired by the city council and converted for municipal use: it was officially re-opened by Prince Charles as the council's meeting place on 9 November 1978.

The council's main offices are at 14 Rose Lane in the centre of Canterbury. The offices form part of the Whitefriars Shopping Centre, which the council converted into its offices during 2023 and 2024. Prior to 2024, the council was based at offices on Military Road, which had been purpose-built for the council in the 1980s.

== Geography ==
Within the district are the towns of Herne Bay and Whitstable, which, with the rural parishes and the cathedral city itself, make up the district of the City of Canterbury. There are 27 parishes within the district, as follows:

- Adisham
- Barham
- Bekesbourne-with-Patrixbourne
- Bishopsbourne
- Blean
- Bridge
- Chartham
- Chestfield
- Chislet
- Fordwich, which has town status
- Hackington
- Harbledown and Rough Common
- Hersden
- Herne and Broomfield
- Hoath
- Ickham
- Kingston
- Littlebourne
- Lower Hardres and Nackington
- Petham
- Sturry
- Thanington Without
- Upper Hardres
- Waltham
- Westbere
- Wickhambreaux
- Womenswold

Swalecliffe is an unparished area within the district.

The district is largely rural, with a coastal strip taken up by the almost unbroken spread of seaside towns and beaches from Seasalter, west of Whitstable, to Herne Bay. Between them and the city the hills rise into the wooded area of Blean, south of which the Great Stour flows from its source beyond Ashford.

== Demography ==
Ethnic Group	1991		2001		2011	
Ethnic Group	Number	%	Number	%	Number	%
White: Total	121,942	98.4%	130,700	96.6%	140,620	93%
White: British	–	–	125,289	92.6%	132,269	87.5%
White: Irish	–	–	1,338		1,260	
White: Gypsy or Irish Traveller	–	–	–	–	374	
White: Other	–	–	4,073	3%	6,717	4.4%
Asian or Asian British: Total	1,086	0.9%	1,964	1.5%	5,135	3.4%
Asian or Asian British: Indian	349		600		1,448	
Asian or Asian British: Pakistani	34		77		306	
Asian or Asian British: Bangladeshi	110		117		251	
Asian or Asian British: Chinese	279		650		1,436	
Asian or Asian British: Other Asian	314		520		1,694	
Black or Black British: Total	409	0.3%	610	0.5%	1,937	1.3%
Black or Black British: Caribbean	121		186		437	
Black or Black British: African	149		384		1,338	
Black or Black British: Other Black	139		40		162	
Mixed or British Mixed: Total	–	–	1,362	1%	2,551	1.7%
Mixed: White and Black Caribbean	–	–	331		680	
Mixed: White and Black African	–	–	134		305	
Mixed: White and Asian	–	–	494		897	
Mixed: Other Mixed	–	–	403		669	
Other: Total	510	0.4%	642	0.5%	902	0.6%
Other: Arab	–	–	–	–	405	
Other: Any other ethnic group	510	0.4%	642	0.5%	497	
Total	123,947	100%	135,278	100%	151,145	100%

Population pyramid of the City of Canterbury in 2020

== Twin towns ==
The district participates in the Sister Cities programme, with links to Bloomington-Normal, Illinois, and Vladimir, Russia.

The Three Towns Association was founded in 1985 on the initiative of three local clergymen to promote person-to-person contact between ordinary people in the UK, the U.S. and Russia. The name was subsequently changed to the Three Cities Association. The Association chose Vladimir as the twin city in Russia because it is the seat of Christianity in that country as Canterbury is the seat of Christianity in England. Vladimir was already twinned with Bloomington-Normal. Among other activities, the Association arranged home-stay exchanges between the two Simon Langton Schools in Canterbury and School No. 23 in Vladimir, where the teaching was conducted in English.

Several towns and villages within the City of Canterbury have their own twinning arrangements: see the articles on Canterbury, Whitstable and Herne Bay.

== See also ==
- List of mayors of Canterbury
- Sheriff of Canterbury
- Listed buildings in the City of Canterbury district, Kent
