= Grade II* listed buildings in City of Canterbury =

There are over 20,000 Grade II* listed buildings in England. This page is a list of these buildings in the district of Canterbury in Kent.

== List of buildings ==
Name	Location	Type	Completed (Note: The date given is the date used by Historic England as significant for the initial building or that of an important part in the structure's description.)	Date designated	Grid ref. (Note: The grid reference is based on the British national grid reference system, sometimes known as OSGB36, used by the Ordnance Survey.) Geo-coordinates	Entry number (Note: The "List Entry Number" is a unique number assigned to each listed building and scheduled monument by Historic England.)	Image
Anne Court, Barham Court	Barham	Apartment	17th century	29 September 1952	TR2098850059; 51°12′25″N 1°09′44″E	1336516	Upload Photo
The Steward's House, Broome Park Hotel	Barham	Steward's house	c.1778	30 January 1967	TR2203648172; 51°11′23″N 1°10′34″E	1111767	The Steward's House, Broome Park Hotel More images
Higham Park (formerly Highland Court Hospital)	Bekesbourne-with-Patrixbourne	Country house	18th century	14 March 1980	TR1934253763; 51°14′27″N 1°08′28″E	1085542	Higham Park (formerly Highland Court Hospital) More images
Howletts Wild Animal Park	Howletts Zoo Park, Bekesbourne-with-Patrixbourne	House	1787	30 January 1967	TR1962356736; 51°16′03″N 1°08′49″E	1336480	Howletts Wild Animal Park More images
Charlton Park	Bishopsbourne	House	16th century with 18th-century frontage	29 September 1952	TR1902651770; 51°13′23″N 1°08′07″E	1350018	Charlton Park More images
Bridge Place	Bridge	Country house	Late 17th century	29 September 1952	TR1812153908; 51°14′33″N 1°07′25″E	1336506	Bridge Place More images
Church of St Peter	Bridge	Church	12th century, restored 1859–61	30 January 1967	TR1834554112; 51°14′40″N 1°07′37″E	1336512	Church of St Peter More images
Mystole Coach House	Mystole House, Chartham	Bell tower	Early 18th century	30 January 1967	TR0950553706; 51°14′39″N 1°00′01″E	1100332	Upload Photo
Mystole House, South Mystole and West Wing	Mystole House, Chartham	House	1980	29 September 1952	TR0952053752; 51°14′40″N 1°00′02″E	1085682	Mystole House, South Mystole and West Wing More images
The Deanery	Chartham	House	17th century	30 January 1967	TR1007255087; 51°15′22″N 1°00′33″E	1085676	Upload Photo
Tudor House	Chislet	House	c.1500	29 September 1952	TR2165964039; 51°19′56″N 1°10′50″E	1084381	Upload Photo
The Town Hall and The Crane House, with the stocks outside the Town Hall	Fordwich	Prison	Probably early 15th century	29 September 1952	TR1804759814; 51°17′44″N 1°07′34″E	1085670	The Town Hall and The Crane House, with the stocks outside the Town Hall More images
Watergate Cottage & Watergate House	Fordwich	House	1967	30 January 1967	TR1804659780; 51°17′43″N 1°07′34″E	1065708	Watergate Cottage & Watergate House More images
Church of the Holy Cross	Hoath	Bell tower	1842	30 January 1967	TR2030864190; 51°20′03″N 1°09′41″E	1085646	Church of the Holy Cross More images
Shelvingford Farmhouse	Shelvingford, Hoath	House	Late 15th century	29 May 2015	TR2114265405	1336522	Shelvingford Farmhouse
Maypole Thatch	Maypole, Hoath	House	Later-Post c1385	14 March 1980	TR2041464967; 51°20′28″N 1°09′48″E	1343666	Upload Photo
New Place	Ickham and Well	House	16th century	29 September 1952	TR2228757870; 51°16′36″N 1°11′09″E	1085607	Upload Photo
The Old Rectory	Ickham, Ickham and Well	Manor house	13th century	29 September 1952	TR2197658249; 51°16′48″N 1°10′53″E	1373865	The Old Rectory More images
Elbridge Farmhouse	Littlebourne	Farmhouse	15th century	29 September 1952	TR2031959591; 51°17′34″N 1°09′31″E	1372874	Elbridge Farmhouse
Kenfield Hall	Petham	Country house	c.1730	29 September 1952	TR1197252520; 51°13′57″N 1°02′06″E	1336559	Upload Photo
Old Hall	Petham	House	14th century	14 March 1980	TR1276751433; 51°13′21″N 1°02′44″E	1054019	Old Hall
Church of St Cosmus and St Damian	Blean, St. Cosmus and St. Damian in the Blean	Church	13th century	30 January 1967	TR1290460666; 51°18′19″N 1°03′11″E	1085522	Church of St Cosmus and St Damian More images
Chapel of St John the Baptist, Milton	Thanington, Thanington Without	Chapel	13th century	30 January 1967	TR1204355693; 51°15′39″N 1°02′16″E	1370012	Chapel of St John the Baptist, Milton More images
Church of St Nicholas	Thanington, Thanington Without	Church	Norman	30 January 1967	TR1315856782; 51°16′13″N 1°03′16″E	1336614	Church of St Nicholas More images
Tonford Manor	Thanington Without	House	1449	29 September 1952	TR1249357040; 51°16′22″N 1°02′42″E	1045882	Tonford Manor More images
Barn at Hardres Court	Hardres Court, Upper Hardres	Aisled barn	Late 15th to early 16th century	14 March 1980	TR1529650678; 51°12′53″N 1°04′53″E	1085505	Upload Photo
Handville Green	Anvil Green, Waltham	House	16th century	14 March 1980	TR1089849622; 51°12′25″N 1°01′04″E	1085517	Upload Photo
Westbere House	Westbere	House	c.1800	29 September 1952	TR1925461036; 51°18′22″N 1°08′39″E	1367055	Westbere House More images
The Old Stone House (formerly The Post Office)	Wickhambreaux	House	16th century or earlier	29 September 1952	TR2206658658; 51°17′02″N 1°10′59″E	1054855	The Old Stone House (formerly The Post Office) More images
Wickham House	Wickhambreaux	Vicarage	1713	30 January 1967	TR2208858792; 51°17′06″N 1°11′00″E	1085492	Wickham House More images
Chapel to St John's Hospital	Canterbury	Chapel	Late 11th/early 12th century	3 December 1949	TR1519558337; 51°17′01″N 1°05′04″E	1241057	Upload Photo
Church of All Saints	Whitstable	Church	Perpendicular	30 March 1951	TR1173966248; 51°21′21″N 1°02′23″E	1084932	Church of All Saints More images
Church of St Alphege with St Margaret	Canterbury	Parish church	Late 12th/13th century	3 December 1949	TR1496458018; 51°16′51″N 1°04′52″E	1241460	Church of St Alphege with St Margaret More images
Church of St Margaret	Canterbury	Parish church	12th century	3 December 1949	TR1488757741; 51°16′42″N 1°04′47″E	1241922	Church of St Margaret More images
Church of St Paul Without the Walls	St Paul's, Canterbury	Church	13th century	3 December 1949	TR1529357715; 51°16′40″N 1°05′08″E	1336814	Church of St Paul Without the Walls More images
Church of the Holy Cross	Canterbury	Church	1381	3 December 1949	TR1459258063; 51°16′53″N 1°04′32″E	1241661	Church of the Holy Cross More images
Cockyns/Cogans Hospital or Cogan House	Canterbury	House	Late 12th century	3 May 1967	TR1473357962; 51°16′49″N 1°04′39″E	1116577	Upload Photo
Conquest House	Canterbury	Timber-framed house	Early Norman	3 December 1949	TR1499258064; 51°16′52″N 1°04′53″E	1241437	Conquest House More images
County of Kent War Memorial Cross	Canterbury	War memorial	1921	16 May 2017	TR1525857875; 51°16′46″N 51°16′46″E	1446080	County of Kent War Memorial Cross More images
Gatehouse to St John's Hospital	Canterbury	Gatehouse	16th century	3 December 1949	TR1520958297; 51°16′59″N 1°05′05″E	1260716	Gatehouse to St John's Hospital More images
House of Agnes Hotel	Canterbury	Timber-framed house	16th century	3 December 1949	TR1444558179; 51°16′57″N 1°04′25″E	1260281	House of Agnes Hotel More images
King's Bridge	Canterbury	Bridge	Medieval	7 September 1973	TR1478657930; 51°16′48″N 1°04′42″E	1085029	King's Bridge More images
Lullingstone House	Canterbury	House	Early 18th century	3 December 1949	TR1474957612; 51°16′38″N 1°04′40″E	1085090	Lullingstone House
Manwood's Hospital	Hackington, Canterbury	Almshouse	1570	3 December 1949	TR1470059134; 51°17′27″N 1°04′40″E	1374126	Manwood's Hospital
Number 77 (part of the Rose and Crown Inn), Nos 78 & 79, St Dunstans St	Canterbury	House	16th century	3 December 1949	TR1447958155; 51°16′56″N 1°04′27″E	1241876	Number 77 (part of the Rose and Crown Inn), Nos 78 & 79, St Dunstans St More images
Old Huguenot Weaver's House	Canterbury	Timber-framed house	16th century	3 December 1949	TR1501358102; 51°16′53″N 1°04′54″E	1241442	Old Huguenot Weaver's House More images
Queen Elizabeth's Guest Chamber	Canterbury	Inn	Late 16th century	3 December 1949	TR1489357817; 51°16′44″N 1°04′47″E	1260873	Queen Elizabeth's Guest Chamber More images
Refectory Hall and Kitchen to St John's Hospital	Canterbury	Kitchen	12th century	3 December 1949	TR1515858333; 51°17′01″N 1°05′02″E	1260717	Refectory Hall and Kitchen to St John's Hospital More images
St Radigund Hall	St Radigun's, Canterbury	Wealden house	15th century	3 December 1949	TR1506958206; 51°16′57″N 1°04′57″E	1336812	St Radigund Hall More images
The Hoystings	Canterbury	House	Early 18th century	3 December 1949	TR1525057206; 51°16′24″N 1°05′04″E	1260634	The Hoystings More images
The King's School Shop	Canterbury	Timber-framed house	16th century	3 December 1949	TR1502358122; 51°16′54″N 1°04′55″E	1241614	The King's School Shop More images
The Presbytery	Canterbury	House	18th century	3 December 1949	TR1513957759; 51°16′42″N 1°05′00″E	1251907	The Presbytery More images
The Roper Gate	Canterbury	Gate	16th century	7 September 1973	TR1434258284; 51°17′00″N 1°04′20″E	1241835	The Roper Gate More images
The Weavers	Canterbury	Jettied house	1500	3 December 1949	TR1478457943; 51°16′48″N 1°04′42″E	1242339	The Weavers More images
Tudor House	Canterbury	House	18th century	3 May 1967	TR1485157961; 51°16′49″N 1°04′46″E	1085169	Tudor House More images
Tyler Hill Railway Tunnel, including North and South Portals, under Tyler Hill (former Canterbury and Whitstable Railway)	Tyler Hill, Canterbury	Railway tunnel	1826–30	24 December 2007	TR1415659825; 51°17′50″N 1°04′14″E	1392354	Tyler Hill Railway Tunnel, including North and South Portals, under Tyler Hill (former Canterbury and Whitstable Railway) More images
Underdown House	Underdown Lane, Eddington	House	17th century	29 September 1951	TR1787866959; 51°21′36″N 1°07′41″E	1084951	Underdown House More images
Walpole House, King's School	Canterbury	Archbishops palace	Medieval	3 December 1949	TR1500658007; 51°16′50″N 1°04′54″E	1241505	Upload Photo
Westgate House	Canterbury	House	1750	3 December 1949	TR1452558123; 51°16′55″N 1°04′29″E	1241911	Westgate House More images
Wincheap House	Canterbury	House	18th century	3 December 1949	TR1434457218; 51°16′26″N 1°04′18″E	1258047	Wincheap House More images
17 Cathedral Precincts	Canterbury	House	18th century	3 December 1949	TR1522857950; 51°16′48″N 1°05′05″E	1085076	17 Cathedral Precincts More images
Pilgrims Entry or Pentise attached to Number 29, Cathedral Precincts	Canterbury	Cathedral precinct	Medieval	7 September 1973	TR1508158043; 51°16′51″N 1°04′58″E	1085079	Pilgrims Entry or Pentise attached to Number 29, Cathedral Precincts More images
30 Northgate	Canterbury	House	18th century	3 May 1967	TR1529858369; 51°17′02″N 1°05′09″E	1096944	30 Northgate More images
1 and 2 High Street	Canterbury	Inn	14th century	3 May 1967	TR1494057805; 51°16′44″N 1°04′50″E	1240669	1 and 2 High Street More images
37 Burgate	Canterbury	House	18th century	3 December 1949	TR1499157856; 51°16′45″N 1°04′53″E	1262580	37 Burgate More images
40 Burgate	Canterbury	House	Late 14th century	3 December 1949	TR1499957820; 51°16′44″N 1°04′53″E	1251875	40 Burgate More images
41 Burgate	Canterbury	Timber-framed house	Late 14th century	3 December 1949	TR1500457831; 51°16′45″N 1°04′53″E	1085121	41 Burgate More images
42 Burgate	Canterbury	Timber-framed house	Late 14th century	3 December 1949	TR1500957829; 51°16′44″N 1°04′53″E	1336773	42 Burgate More images
43 Burgate	Canterbury	Timber-framed house	Late 14th century	3 December 1949	TR1501557827; 51°16′44″N 1°04′54″E	1251891	43 Burgate More images
62 Burgate	Canterbury	House	Early 18th century	3 December 1949	TR1517157744; 51°16′41″N 1°05′02″E	1336774	62 Burgate More images
3 Best Lane	Canterbury	House	18th century	3 May 1967	TR1486557980; 51°16′50″N 1°04′46″E	1085167	3 Best Lane More images
4 Best Lane	Canterbury	House	18th century	3 May 1967	TR1486357976; 51°16′49″N 1°04′46″E	1336756	4 Best Lane More images
2 Castle Street	Canterbury	Town house	18th century	3 May 1967	TR1476457626; 51°16′38″N 1°04′40″E	1085088	2 Castle Street
68 and 68a Castle Street	Canterbury	House	Early 18th century	3 May 1967	TR1470457600; 51°16′37″N 1°04′37″E	1085101	68 and 68a Castle Street More images
69 Castle Street	Canterbury	House	16th century	3 May 1967	TR1471457608; 51°16′38″N 1°04′38″E	1252148	69 Castle Street More images
1–8 Mercery Lane	Canterbury	House	14th century	3 December 1949	TR1495757830; 51°16′45″N 1°04′51″E	1097028	1–8 Mercery Lane More images
42–45 Ivy Lane	Canterbury	Wealden house	15th century	3 December 1949	TR1538357600; 51°16′37″N 1°05′12″E	1260829	42–45 Ivy Lane More images
8 Palace Street	Canterbury	Timber-framed house	Medieval	3 December 1949	TR1496157993; 51°16′50″N 1°04′51″E	1241459	8 Palace Street More images
41–45 Palace Street	Canterbury	House	Medieval	3 May 1967	TR1501458039; 51°16′51″N 1°04′54″E	1241616	41–45 Palace Street More images
16 Watling Street	Canterbury	House	Early 18th century	3 December 1949	TR1485857592; 51°16′37″N 1°04′45″E	1242830	16 Watling Street More images
