= Frank Montgomery School =

Frank Montgomery Secondary Modern School

Location
- Bredlands Lane; Sturry, Kent, CT2 0HD; England; 51°18′42″N 1°08′54″E

Information
- Type: Secondary Modern
- Motto: "Strive for the Right"
- Local authority: Kent
- Department for Education URN: 118925 Tables
- Head teacher: Closed 2007
- Gender: Mixed
- Age: 11 to 16
- Enrolment: Closed 2007
- Colour: Bottle green

The Frank Montgomery School was a mixed-gender secondary modern school in the village of Sturry near Canterbury in east Kent. It was founded in 1935 and closed in 2007, when the site and school roll was taken over by Spires Academy.

== Foundation as Central School ==
Frank Montgomery School was founded in 1935. The school mainly took in children from the senior classes of existing schools in the nearby farming villages of Sturry and Westbere, and the coal mining village of Hersden. It was originally named Sturry Central School. Mr G.E. Draper-Hunt was the first headmaster, remaining in post until his retirement in 1958. Until its replacement by Spires Academy school in 2007, the school's uniform of bottle green, and shield showing the white horse of the county of Kent, a coal mine tower and wheat sheaves, with the motto Strive for the Right, remained the same.

When it opened in 1935 the school was hailed as a model for future school building design being the first in the local school district to be built entirely on one level. The building cost was £12,548 and was officially opened by Walter James, 4th Baron Northbourne, an admirer of Rudolf Steiner and a sportsman who competed in the 1920 Summer Olympics. The stated aim of the school on opening was to specialise in 'practical education, such as cookery, laundry, gardening, woodwork, metalwork and practical geography'. The initial school roll was 200 pupils, taught by the headmaster and six other teachers, with an initial maximum capacity for up to 280 pupils.

== Secondary modern school ==
With the enactment of the Education Act 1944 the school was designated a secondary modern school, known as Sturry County Secondary Modern School. It changed its name to The Frank Montgomery School in 1980. As a secondary modern school the Frank Montgomery School was a non-selective school which meant it almost exclusively took in pupils who had failed to pass the controversial eleven-plus exam, also known as the Kent Test, set by Kent County Council to stream children to attend either selective grammar schools or non-selective secondary modern schools. According to Anthony Sampson, in his book Anatomy of Britain (1965), there were structural problems within the testing process that underpinned the eleven plus which meant it tended to result in secondary modern schools being overwhelmingly dominated by the children of poor and working class parents, while grammar schools were dominated by the children of wealthier middle class parents. To some extent the Frank Montgomery School corresponded to this pattern by being dominated by poor and working class children, and by having both low academic expectations and poor examination results.

== Local community ==
After it opened the school soon became a focus for local community life, being the location for numerous community events, including the Seventh Annual Kent Collieries Ambulance Challenge in 1938, and hosting a visit by diplomats from the American Embassy in London in 1944. The school was on the receiving end of bombing damage in 1942, during the Second World War. In 1960 the school's girls' choir appeared on the Home Service of BBC Radio, singing on a programme called 'Let the People Sing', described by the Radio Times as 'A weekly contest between choirs from all over the United Kingdom.' The choir appeared on the programme again the following year.

== Progressive innovations and controversies ==
One of the innovations put in place by the school upon its name change to Frank Montgomery School was an attempt to end the division of pupils into streamed classes, each defined by the presumed educational ability of pupils. Consequently, the school ceased to stream the pupils by ability and also abolished the six letter system previously designating each class, A to F, in which A had been the highest ability stream, and F the lowest ability stream. Instead year groups were designated by the first six letters of the school's name, F, R, A, N, K and M, and each class was officially assigned as being of equal ability. In 1987 Frank Montgomery School also featured on a controversial episode of the BBC television documentary series Panorama as an example of a school abolishing competitive sports.

== Special measures and closure ==
Frank Montgomery School was placed in special measures in 1998 due to poor Ofsted inspection reports, although it left special measures five years later following intervention by the Local Education Authority and Ofsted. However, in 2004 the BBC reported that the school was still bottom in the national school league tables for GCSE examination results in England and Wales, with just 4% of pupils on the school roll achieving 5 or more GCSEs at grade C or above. Three years later, at the point of its closure, the school had risen from bottom place to thirteenth from bottom with 7% of pupils achieving the official requirement of five or more GCSE results at grade C or above, and 43% of pupils gaining at least one GCSE at grade C or above.

The school returned to special measures in 2005 and remained there until its closure in 2007, at which point a new academy school, Spires Academy, was formed on the same campus, taking in the former pupils of Frank Montgomery.

== Exam results ==
Results for Pupils GCSE Examinations
Year	% Gaining Any Grades A* to C
1997	13%
1998	21%
1999	9%
2000	14%
2001	10%
2002	19%
2003	7%
2004	4%
2005	26%
2006	43%

Source: Ofsted

== Headmasters and headmistresses ==
- G. E. Draper-Hunt (first headmaster) (1935-1958)
- G.A.D. Davies (1958-
- Betty Chapman
- Rodney Freakes (c. 1990-2001)
- Ian McGinn (2001-2007)

== Notable former pupils ==
- Rusty Goffe, actor
- Michael Paraskos, novelist and art historian
