= Listed buildings in Sturry =

Civil Parish in Kent, England

Sturry is a village and civil parish in the City of Canterbury district of Kent, England. It contains 43 listed buildings that are recorded in the National Heritage List for England. Of these two are grade I and 41 are grade II.

This list is based on the information retrieved online from Historic England.

== Key ==
Grade	Criteria
I	Buildings that are of exceptional interest
II*	Particularly important buildings of more than special interest
II	Buildings that are of special interest

== Listing ==
Name	Grade	Location	Type	Completed (Note: The date given is the date used by Historic England as significant for the initial building or that of an important part in the structure's description.)	Date designated	Grid ref. (Note: The grid reference is based on the British national grid reference system, sometimes known as OSGB36, used by the Ordnance Survey.) Geo-coordinates	Notes	Entry number (Note: The "List Entry Number" is a unique number assigned to each listed building and scheduled monument by Historic England.)	Image	Wikidata
Vale Farmhouse	II	Barnet's Lane, Broad Oak, Vale Farm			30 January 1967	TR1662662329; 51°19′08″N 1°06′27″E		1336586	Upload Photo	Q26621068
5 and 6, Chapel Lane	II	5 and 6, Chapel Lane			14 March 1980	TR1767260094; 51°17′54″N 1°07′16″E		1298862	Upload Photo	Q26586305
Mead Manor	II	Chapel Lane, Broad Oak			29 September 1952	TR1685661290; 51°18′34″N 1°06′36″E		1085526	Upload Photo	Q26372997
Church of St Nicholas	I	Church Lane	church building		30 January 1967	TR1761160110; 51°17′55″N 1°07′13″E		1298867	Church of St Nicholas More images	Q7594934
The Old Vicarage	II	Church Lane			14 March 1980	TR1768660136; 51°17′55″N 1°07′16″E		1085525	Upload Photo	Q26372990
1, Field Way	II	1, Field Way			14 March 1980	TR1774360348; 51°18′02″N 1°07′20″E		1085527	Upload Photo	Q26373002
Crossways	II	Field Way			14 March 1980	TR1775660330; 51°18′02″N 1°07′20″E		1054858	Upload Photo	Q26306508
Stonerocks Farmhouse	II	Hawe Lane, Stonerocks Farm			30 January 1967	TR1854961516; 51°18′39″N 1°08′04″E		1336587	Upload Photo	Q26621069
Calcott Hall	II	Herne Bay Road, Calcott			14 March 1980	TR1736862805; 51°19′22″N 1°07′06″E		1085528	Upload Photo	Q26373009
Sweech Farmhouse	II	Herne Bay Road, Sweech Farm			29 September 1952	TR1733661445; 51°18′38″N 1°07′01″E		1298835	Upload Photo	Q26586280
Barn at Hicks Forstal Farm	II	Hicks Forstal Road			14 May 1976	TR1807463866; 51°19′55″N 1°07′45″E		1084975	Upload Photo	Q26370106
2 and 4, High Street	II	2 and 4, High Street			2 August 1976	TR1772260335; 51°18′02″N 1°07′19″E		1040051	Upload Photo	Q26291855
5, High Street	II	5, High Street			2 August 1976	TR1771760327; 51°18′01″N 1°07′18″E		1085529	Upload Photo	Q26373014
6, High Street	II	6, High Street			14 March 1980	TR1771460320; 51°18′01″N 1°07′18″E		1040056	Upload Photo	Q26291860
7-10, High Street	II	7-10, High Street			14 March 1980	TR1770160307; 51°18′01″N 1°07′18″E		1085530	Upload Photo	Q26373019
35 and 36, High Street	II	35 and 36, High Street, CT2 0BD			14 March 1980	TR1771560271; 51°18′00″N 1°07′18″E		1040023	Upload Photo	Q26291826
Former Stable Adjoining No 36	II	37, High Street, CT2 0BD			14 March 1980	TR1770960280; 51°18′00″N 1°07′18″E		1085532	Upload Photo	Q26373030
39 and 40, High Street	II	39 and 40, High Street			14 March 1980	TR1771960301; 51°18′01″N 1°07′19″E		1372042	Upload Photo	Q26653167
Georgian House	II	41, High Street			2 November 1978	TR1772460307; 51°18′01″N 1°07′19″E		1085533	Upload Photo	Q26373036
Grove House	II	High Street			14 March 1980	TR1772860310; 51°18′01″N 1°07′19″E		1040035	Upload Photo	Q26291840
Prospect House	II	High Street			16 December 1975	TR1773460316; 51°18′01″N 1°07′19″E		1085534	Upload Photo	Q26373041
The Swan Inn	II	High Street	pub		14 March 1980	TR1769060283; 51°18′00″N 1°07′17″E		1085531	The Swan Inn More images	Q26373025
Whatmer Hall	II	71, Island Road			30 January 1967	TR1824460813; 51°18′16″N 1°07′47″E		1040016	Upload Photo	Q26291821
Duxbury	II	73, Island Road			14 March 1980	TR1825660821; 51°18′17″N 1°07′47″E		1085537	Upload Photo	Q26373058
Headmasters House	II	Kings School			14 March 1980	TR1757960246; 51°17′59″N 1°07′11″E		1336612	Upload Photo	Q26621095
Blaxland Farmhouse	II	Mayton Lane, Blaxland Farm			6 May 1974	TR1621763193; 51°19′36″N 1°06′07″E		1372037	Upload Photo	Q26653162
1, Mill Road	II	1, Mill Road			14 March 1980	TR1747759973; 51°17′50″N 1°07′05″E		1085538	Upload Photo	Q26373064
Meadow Cottages	II	1 and 2, Mill Road			28 June 1976	TR1777360091; 51°17′54″N 1°07′21″E		1045923	Upload Photo	Q26298034
Black Mill Cottage	II	4, Mill Road			14 March 1980	TR1747359948; 51°17′50″N 1°07′05″E		1336590	Upload Photo	Q26621073
Bridge House	II	6, Mill Road			30 January 1967	TR1751959964; 51°17′50″N 1°07′07″E		1045914	Upload Photo	Q26298025
Former Welsh Harp Public House	II	Mill Road, CT2 0AS	pub		14 March 1980	TR1777660117; 51°17′55″N 1°07′21″E		1085539	Former Welsh Harp Public House More images	Q26373069
Sunnyside Cottages	II	Mill Road			14 March 1980	TR1777060268; 51°18′00″N 1°07′21″E		1336591	Upload Photo	Q26621074
Garden Wall to Milner Court	II	Milner Lane			30 January 1967	TR1753860124; 51°17′55″N 1°07′09″E		1336611	Upload Photo	Q26621094
Gateway to Milner Court	II	Milner Lane			29 September 1952	TR1757260073; 51°17′53″N 1°07′10″E		1085498	Upload Photo	Q26372868
Mill Cottage	II	Milner Lane			14 March 1980	TR1757060040; 51°17′52″N 1°07′10″E		1085540	Upload Photo	Q26373074
Mill House	II	Milner Lane			14 March 1980	TR1757260031; 51°17′52″N 1°07′10″E		1045925	Upload Photo	Q26298036
Milner Court	II	Milner Lane			29 September 1952	TR1752360128; 51°17′55″N 1°07′08″E		1369995	Upload Photo	Q26651261
The School Hall	I	Milner Lane	tithe barn		29 September 1952	TR1759660191; 51°17′57″N 1°07′12″E		1085499	The School Hall More images	Q17529527
Former Royal Oak Public House	II	Orchard View, Broad Oak, CT2 0FD	pub		16 December 1975	TR1679861537; 51°18′42″N 1°06′34″E		1085502	Former Royal Oak Public House More images	Q26372883
Summer Hill	II	Shalloak Road, Broad Oak			6 May 1974	TR1670461442; 51°18′39″N 1°06′29″E		1085500	Upload Photo	Q26372874
Former Stable Block at Sweech Farm	II	Sweech Farm, Herne Bay Road, CT3 4FZ			14 March 1980	TR1732161461; 51°18′39″N 1°07′01″E		1040066	Upload Photo	Q26291871
124, Sweechgate	II	124, Sweechgate, Broad Oak			14 March 1980	TR1674461528; 51°18′42″N 1°06′31″E		1336613	Upload Photo	Q26621096
Broad Oak	II	Sweechgate, Broad Oak			14 March 1980	TR1698061400; 51°18′37″N 1°06′43″E		1085501	Upload Photo	Q26372880

== See also ==
- Grade I listed buildings in Kent
- Grade II* listed buildings in Kent

== Sources ==
- Newman, John (2013) [1969], Kent: North-East and East, The Buildings of England, New Haven and London: Yale University Press, ISBN 978-0-300-18506-5
