= Marshside =

Marshside is the name of the following places:

- Marshside, Cumbria, England
- Marshside, Kent, England
- Marshside, Merseyside, England
- Marsh Side, Norfolk, England
