= Spires Academy =

Location
- Bredlands Lane; Hersden; Canterbury, Kent, CT2 0HD; England; 51.311537°N 1.147902°E

Information
- Type: Academy
- Department for Education URN: 135305 Tables
- Ofsted: Reports
- Gender: Coeducational
- Age: 11 to 16
- Houses: Farah, Attenborough, Seacole, Chaucer, Newton
- Colours: Blue, red, green and orange
- Website: http://www.spiresacademy.com/

The Spires Academy is a non-selective secondary school for pupils aged 11–16 in Canterbury, Kent. There is a sixth form. The school has dual specialist status in business and enterprise, and in visual, creative and performing arts. Spires is independently governed, but funded by the sponsors and the Department for Children, Schools and Families. As a non-selective school the school does not insist on prospective pupils passing the eleven-plus examination for entry, and it is free to attend. The Academy is subject, like other schools, to regular inspections, but is managed by an ‘Academy Trust’ called E21C, rather than a local education authority. According to Ofsted inspectors, boys do worse at maths at the school, and generally the school needs to improve (academically).

The school has developed strong links with Simon Langton Girls' Grammar School in nearby Canterbury.

== History ==
The school is located on the former site of Sturry Secondary Modern School, later renamed Frank Montgomery School, and is the only secondary school in Sturry.

The academy replaced the former Frank Montgomery School building near Sturry in 2007, taking in the pupils from the former institution, and also replacing the former school which had been in special measures and judged by the government as failing. In March 2011, building started work on a new replacement building, this was carried out by Carillion (management) and Gallagher (construction). and completed in July 2012. The new £13.2m building was equipped with state of the art academic facilities and also included sports buildings and facilities. The predominantly naturally-ventilated design also uses biomass boilers as part of its heat source. The building achieved a BREEAM ‘Very Good’ rating. The old building is in the process of being demolished.

== Electronic learning ==
In 2012, Spires Academy spent £125,000 on iPads for all its pupils, they were given to 450 youngsters, but the staff insisted it will not be the end of the traditional pen and paper being used in the classroom. However, it was claimed the gadgets would revolutionise teaching and boost grades and were bought using the school's IT budget and a government grant. The Kent school is the second to provide iPads to pupils, following Longfield Academy, near Dartford.
