= Gallagher Group =

Gallagher Group may refer to:

- Gallagher Group (New Zealand), an electronics company specialising in animal management, security, and fuel systems
- Gallagher Group (UK), a civil engineering, groundworks contractor and property development company
