= Grays, Kent =

Hamlet in Kent, England

Coordinates: 51°21′49″N 1°11′56″E

Grays
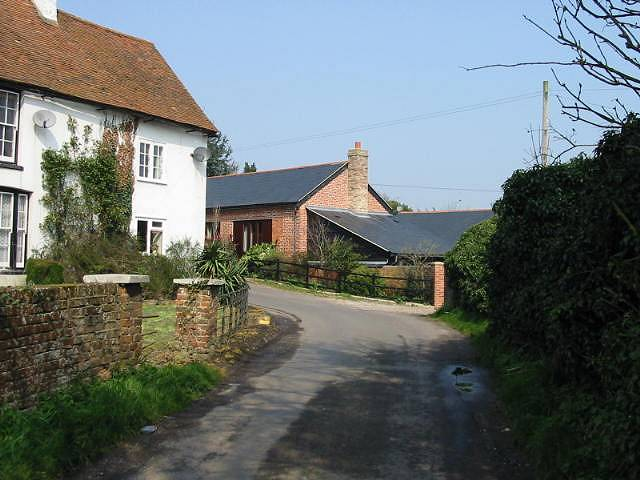
- Near Grays Farm

- Location within Kent
- Civil parish: Chislet
- District: Canterbury
- Shire county: Kent
- Region: South East
- Country: England
- Sovereign state: United Kingdom
- Post town: Canterbury
- Postcode district: CT3
- Police: Kent
- Fire: Kent
- Ambulance: South East Coast
- UK Parliament: Herne Bay and Sandwich

Grays is a hamlet within the civil parish of Chislet, near Canterbury, Kent. It is located to the south of the A299 road and is located on the North Stream, a tributary of the River Wantsum. The hamlet consists of a small collection of houses (Little Grays) and the moated Grays Farm. On the A299 is the large public house named the Roman Galley.
