= Chislet Windmill =

Windmill in Chislet, Kent, England

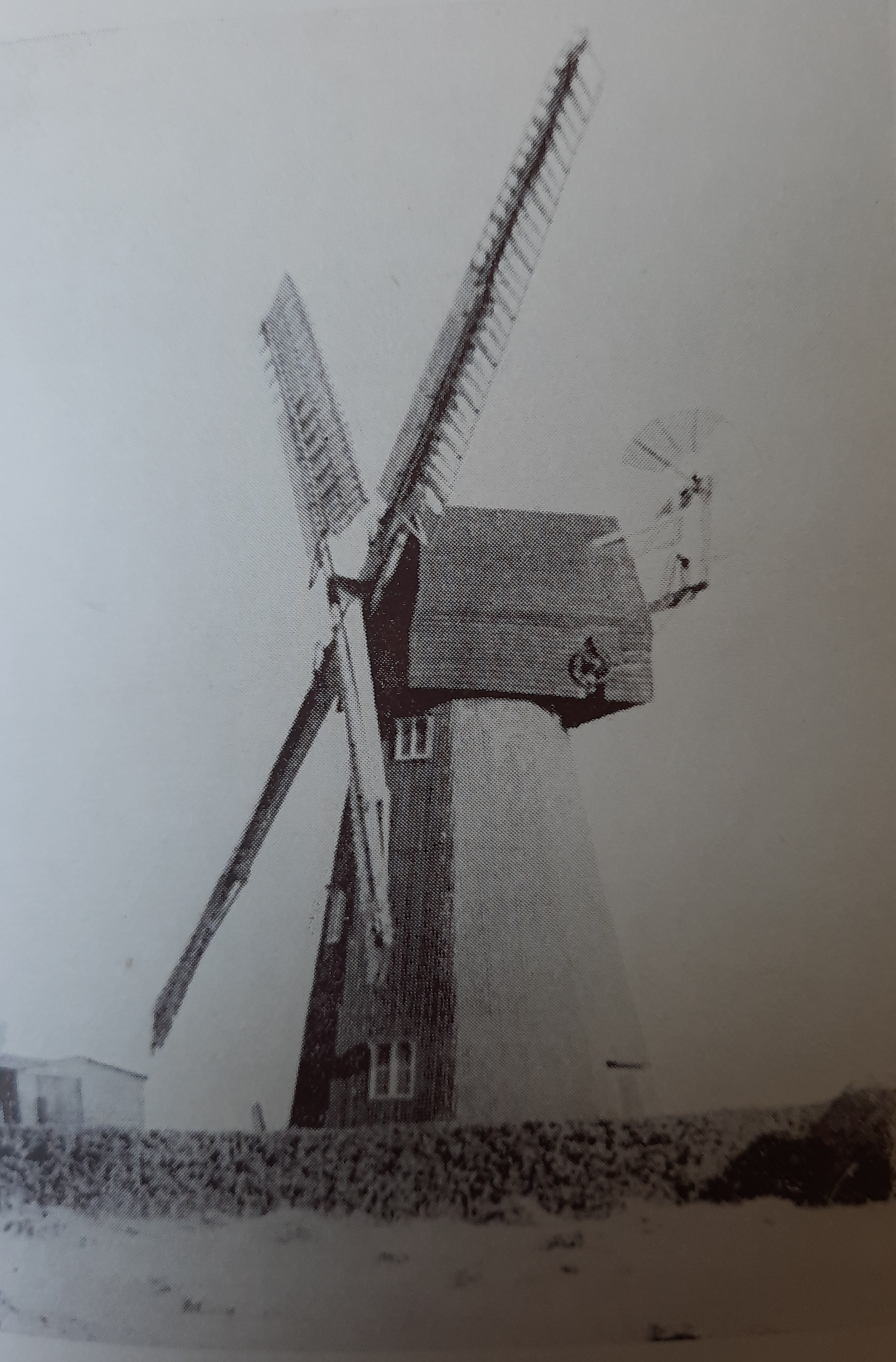
- Chislet Windmill
- Interactive map of Chislet Windmill

Origin
- Grid reference: TR 224 679
- Coordinates: 51°21′59.6″N 1°11′38″E
- Year built: 1744

Information
- Purpose: Corn mill
- Type: Smock mill
- Storeys: Three-storey smock
- Base storeys: Low base of only a few courses
- Smock sides: Eight-sided
- No. of sails: Four
- Type of sails: Spring sails
- Winding: Fantail
- Fantail blades: Six blades
- No. of pairs of millstones: Three pairs
- Year lost: 2005

Chislet windmill was a Grade II listed smock mill in Chislet, Kent, England. It was built in 1744 and burnt down on 15 October 2005.

== History ==
The earliest record of a mill at Chislet is from 1666. Chislet windmill was built in 1744. It was marked on Murdoch Mackenzie's map of 1774 and the 1819-43 Ordnance Survey map and subsequent maps. The mill was working until 1916, when the cap and sails blew off in a gale, it is said that the fantail was tied up by the tenant of the Mill House and thus was unable to turn the mill into wind, thus leading to the mill being tailwinded. During the Second World War, Barnes Wallis lived in the Mill House, and watched the tests of the bouncing bomb at nearby Reculver from the top of the mill. The corrugated iron clad tower of the mill, with a simple roof over and retaining its major machinery stood until 15 October 2005 when it was destroyed by fire.

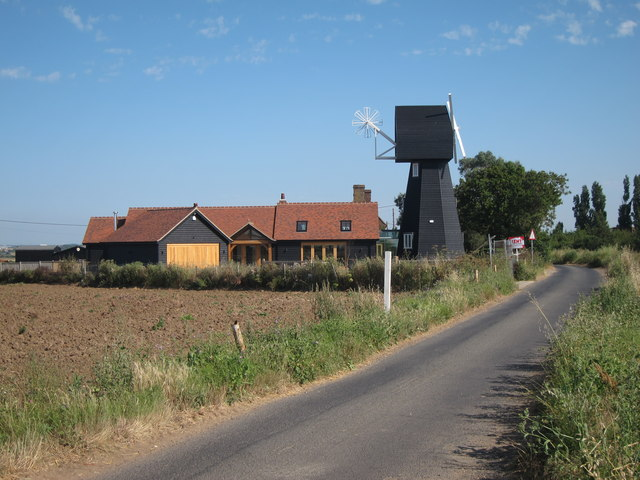
Replica Mill

In 2011, a replica mill was built on the site of the old mill as part of a new house.

== Description ==
Chislet windmill was a three-storey black smock mill on a low brick base, with four spring sails. The mill was winded by a fantail. The mill drove three pairs of millstones. The Wallower, Upright Shaft, Great Spur Wheel and two of the three Stone Nuts were wood, the third Stone Nut was iron.

== Millers ==
- Anthony May 1765-89
- M May 1795
- Henry Collard 1847
- Jonathan Packer 1862
- John Wootton 1878
- Thomas Wooton
- John Walter Wooton - 1918

References for above:-
