= Listed buildings in Hersden =

Historic structures in Kent, England

Hersden is a village and civil parish in the City of Canterbury district of Kent, England. It contains three grade II listed buildings that are recorded in the National Heritage List for England.

This list is based on the information retrieved online from Historic England.

== Key ==
Grade	Criteria
I	Buildings that are of exceptional interest
II*	Particularly important buildings of more than special interest
II	Buildings that are of special interest

== Listing ==
Name	Grade	Location	Type	Completed (Note: The date given is the date used by Historic England as significant for the initial building or that of an important part in the structure's description.)	Date designated	Grid ref. (Note: The grid reference is based on the British national grid reference system, sometimes known as OSGB36, used by the Ordnance Survey.) Geo-coordinates	Notes	Entry number (Note: The "List Entry Number" is a unique number assigned to each listed building and scheduled monument by Historic England.)	Image	Wikidata
Bredlands Farmhouse	II	Bredlands Lane, Bredlands			14 March 1980	TR1955361958; 51°18′52″N 1°08′57″E		1187135	Upload Photo	Q26482359
Chislet Park	II	Island Road, Chislet Park			30 January 1967	TR2091462936; 51°19′21″N 1°10′09″E		1085657	Upload Photo	Q26373681
Westbere Court	II	Island Road, Westbere			14 March 1980	TR2094562150; 51°18′56″N 1°10′09″E		1085483	Upload Photo	Q26372792

== See also ==
- Grade I listed buildings in Kent
- Grade II* listed buildings in Kent

== Sources ==
- Newman, John (2013) [1969], Kent: North-East and East, The Buildings of England, New Haven and London: Yale University Press, ISBN 978-0-300-18506-5
