= Highstead =

Village in Kent, England

Coordinates: 51.3518°N 1.1779°E

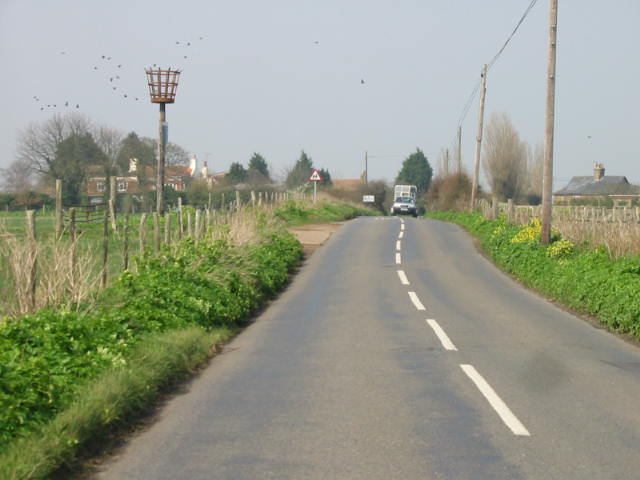
Approaching Highstead on Boyden Gate Hill

Highstead is a village near Chislet, off the A299 road, in the Canterbury District, in the English county of Kent. It is near the town of Herne Bay. Highstead is known for its iron-age pottery findings.
