= Church of St Mary and All Saints, Droxford =

Church of St Mary and All Saints
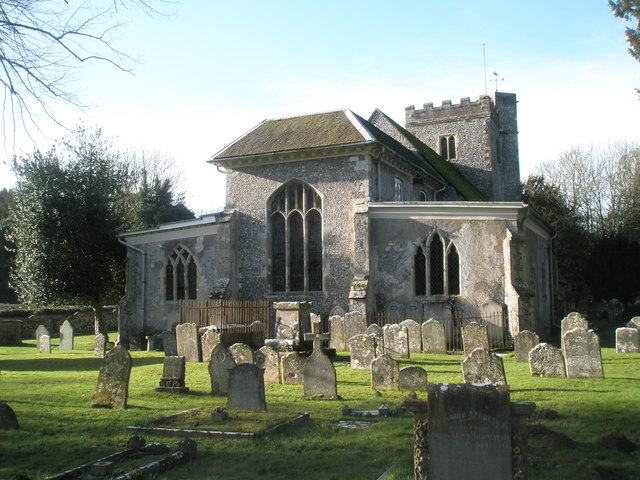
- Viewed from the east
- Church of St Mary and All Saints
- 50°57′36.4″N 1°8′9.7″W
- OS grid reference: SU 608 182
- Location: Droxford, Hampshire
- Country: England
- Denomination: Church of England

Architecture
- Heritage designation: Grade I
- Designated: 6 March 1967

Administration
- Diocese: Diocese of Portsmouth

The Church of St Mary and All Saints is an Anglican church in the village of Droxford, in Hampshire, England. It is in the Diocese of Portsmouth, and is one of the churches of the Meon Bridge Benefice. The building is Grade I listed; the earliest parts of the church date from the Norman period.

== History and description ==
St Wilfrid is associated with the founding of churches in the Meon Valley in the 7th century. It is thought however that the original church at Droxford was built at the time of King Egbert of Wessex, who in 826 granted land at "Drocenesford" to the monks at Winchester Monastery. The oldest parts of the present church, the nave and chancel, are 12th-century. The north aisle and chapel were added in the late 12th century; the south aisle and chapel were added in the 13th century.

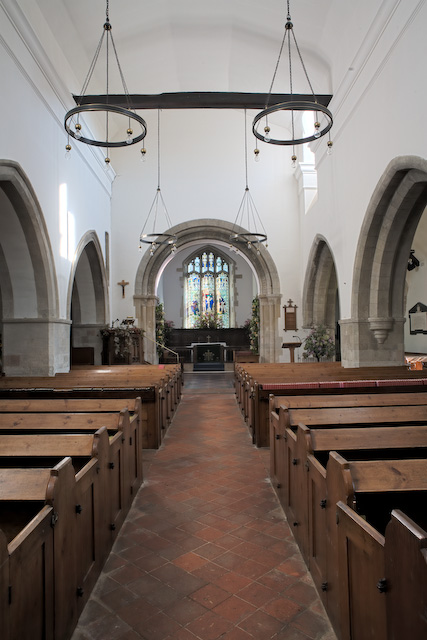
The nave, looking towards the chancel

The Norman chancel arch has two orders on the nave side, the inner having a zigzag pattern; on the chancel side there is one plain order. The north and south doors in the nave, moved from their original positions, have Norman arches with zigzag and other decoration. The nave, of which the north and south sides were originally the walls of the church, has three bays, the arcades having pointed arches.

=== 15th century and later ===
The aisles were rebuilt in the 15th or early 16th century. The tower was built, perhaps replacing an earlier tower, in 1599. The wooden altar rail, with balustrades of turned shafts, is of the 17th century.

In the 18th century there was renovation of the roofs of the nave and chancel, and ceilings were added. The current pews were added in 1847. There was restoration of the church in 1903. A stained glass window by Martin Travers was added in 1938 with a second by Carl Johannes Edwards added in 1962.

=== South chapel ===
The 19th-century stained glass window in the south chapel includes an image of St Wilfrid with the builders of the church.

In the south chapel there is a tomb with an effigy in Purbeck marble of a lady, thought to be the mother of John Drokensford (died 1329) who became Bishop of Bath and Wells. The tomb, found in a local meadow in 1820, is thought to have been removed from the church in an earlier period.

=== Bells ===
There are five bells. In 1968, the earlier set of four bells was augmented by a treble from the redundant St Margaret's Church, Canterbury.

== See also ==
- Corhampton Church
