= Corhampton Church =

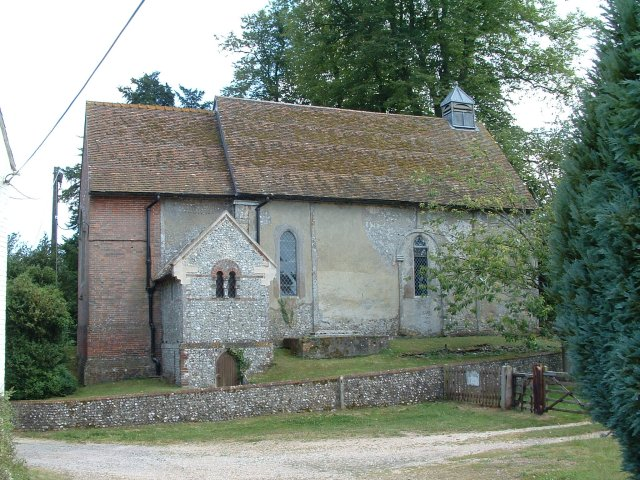
- Viewed from the north
- Corhampton Church
- 50°58′44.76″N 1°07′56.82″W
- OS grid reference: SU 610 203
- Location: Corhampton, Hampshire
- Country: England
- Denomination: Church of England

History
- Founded: c. 1020

Architecture
- Heritage designation: Grade I
- Designated: 6 March 1967

Administration
- Diocese: Diocese of Portsmouth

Corhampton Church is an Anglican church in the village of Corhampton, in Hampshire, England. Unusually, it does not have a dedication. It is in the Diocese of Portsmouth, and is one of the churches of the Meon Bridge Benefice. The building, dating from the early 11th century, is Grade I listed.

== Description ==
The church stands on a mound next to the River Meon. It was built about 1020, and is described in the listing text as an "almost complete two-cell Saxon church". The stone sundial, to the right of the south porch, is a Saxon tide dial. Inside is the original Saxon chancel arch.

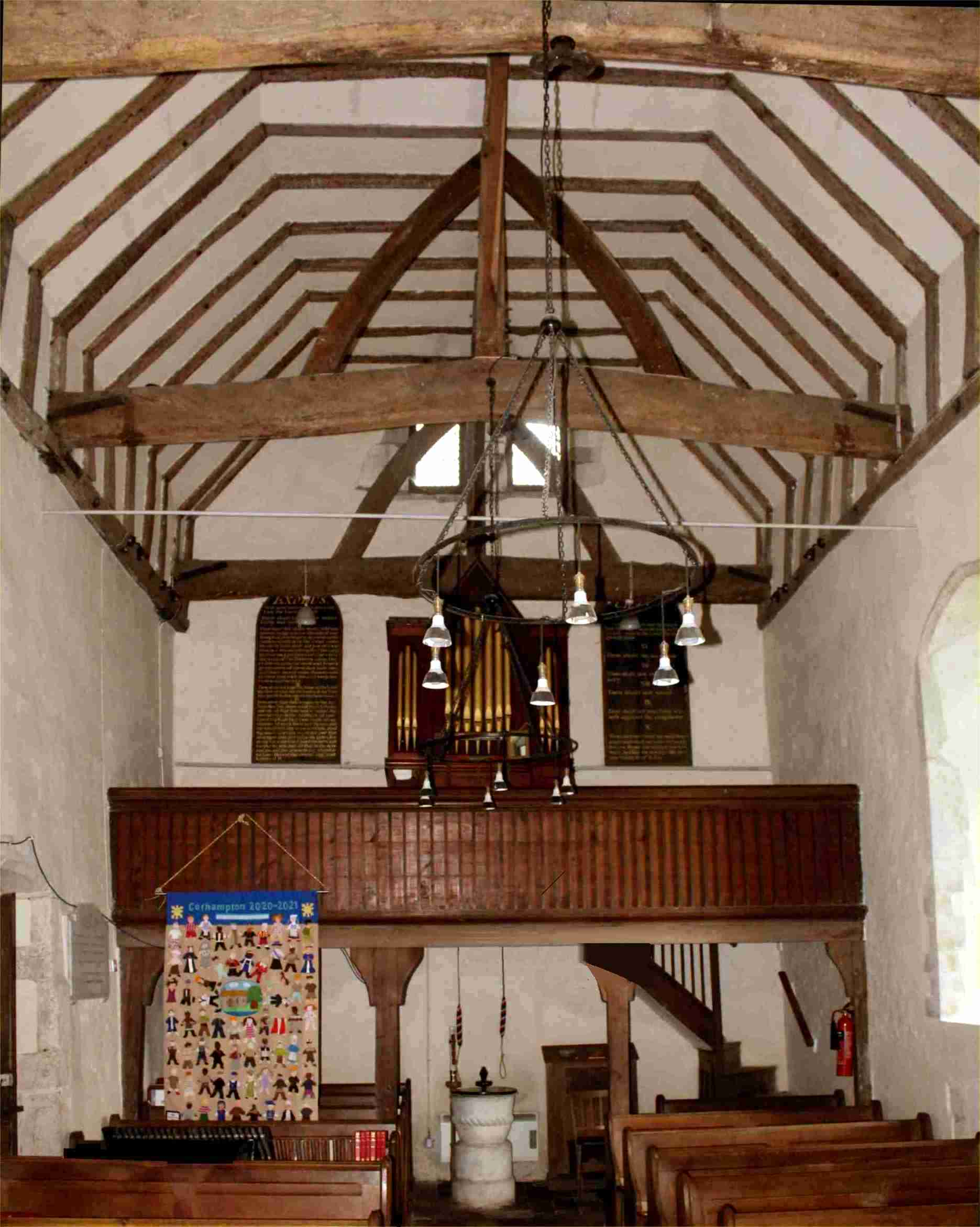
Interior in 2023

In the south-east of the chancel is a stone seat, thought to date from the 13th century. The vestry and south porch are later constructions. The altar rail is 18th-century, and there is a 19th-century gallery at the west end. The east end of the chancel was rebuilt in brick in 1855.

There was restoration in 1905 by Sir Thomas Jackson, including the top of the west gable, which has a diaper brick and flint pattern. There was further restoration in 1999.

=== Wall paintings ===
Medieval wall paintings, now faint, were discovered in the 19th century. They are on the west side of the chancel arch, showing the expulsion from the Garden of Eden; and on the north, south and west walls of the chancel, showing legendary stories from the life of St Swithun.

== See also ==
- Church of St Mary and All Saints, Droxford
