= Fordwich Town Hall =

Municipal building in Fordwich, Kent, England

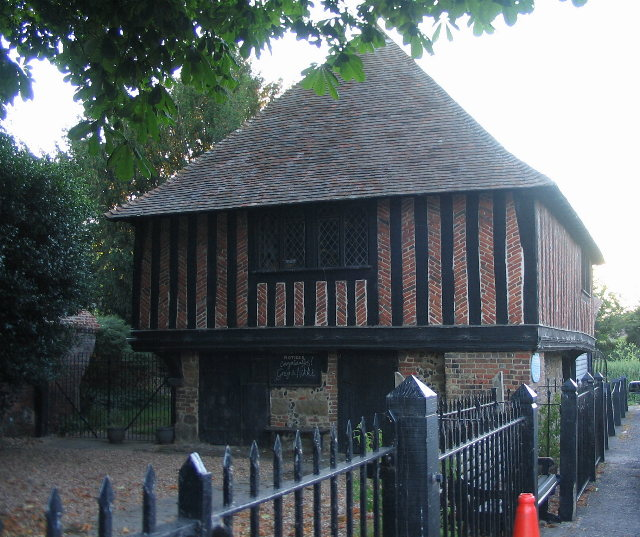
- Forwich Town Hall

- Shown in Kent
- 51.2957°N 1.1262°E
- Location: King Street, Fordwich

History
- Built: 1544

Site notes
- Architectural style: Tudor style

Listed Building – Grade II*
- Official name: The Town Hall and The Crane House, with the stocks outside the Town Hall
- Designated: 29 September 1952
- Reference no.: 1085670

Fordwich Town Hall is a municipal structure in King Street, Fordwich, Kent, England. The structure, which serves as the meeting place of Fordwich Town Council, is a Grade II* listed building.

== History ==
Elements of the building, which was designed in the Tudor style using timber frame construction, date back to the early 15th century. An earlier building on the site was repaired in 1474. Records indicate that it was then substantially rebuilt in brick, rubble and stone in around 1544. The design involved a symmetrical main frontage facing south parallel with King Street. On the ground floor, which was built in a mixture of red brick and rubble, there were two wooden doors to the left and right of centre. On the first floor, which was jettied out over the ground floor and finished in herringbone brickwork interspersed with a series of vertical posts, there was a central four-light casement window. Internally, the ground floor was used as a prison for petty criminals and the first floor was used as a courtroom. The courtroom was just 16 feet (4.9 m) long by 22 feet (6.7 m) wide.

The first floor contained two cells, one managed under the jurisdiction of the borough council and the other one under the jurisdiction of the officials of St Augustine's Abbey. The muniments chest in the courtroom dates back to the 13th century and the courtroom table was made in 1580. At the rear of the building, which fronts onto the River Great Stour, a crane house was built to accommodate the local crane which disembarked goods for the town which served as an outport for Canterbury.

The courtroom was used as an events venue from an early stage and 16th century performances included the Children of the Chapel giving a rendition of Marlowe's play Dido, Queen of Carthage in 1590. There is also evidence that the King's Men, a troop which included William Shakespeare among its members, performed plays in the courtroom in October 1605.

The courtroom continued to be used for criminal trials until 1855, and it also remained the meeting place for the council of the ancient borough of Fordwich, until it was abolished under the Municipal Corporations Act 1883. It subsequently became the meeting place of Fordwich Town Council when it was reformed in 1976.

== See also ==
- Grade II* listed buildings in City of Canterbury
