= Listed buildings in Chislet =

Historic structures in Kent, England

Chislet is a village and civil parish in the City of Canterbury district of Kent, England. It contains 39 listed buildings that are recorded in the National Heritage List for England. Of these one is grade I, one is grade II* and 37 are grade II.

This list is based on the information retrieved online from Historic England.

== Key ==
Grade	Criteria
I	Buildings that are of exceptional interest
II*	Particularly important buildings of more than special interest
II	Buildings that are of special interest

== Listing ==
Name	Grade	Location	Type	Completed (Note: The date given is the date used by Historic England as significant for the initial building or that of an important part in the structure's description.)	Date designated	Grid ref. (Note: The grid reference is based on the British national grid reference system, sometimes known as OSGB36, used by the Ordnance Survey.) Geo-coordinates	Notes	Entry number (Note: The "List Entry Number" is a unique number assigned to each listed building and scheduled monument by Historic England.)	Image	Wikidata
Holly Cottage	II				11 November 2014	TR2139766229; 51°21′07″N 1°10′41″E		1421985	Upload Photo	Q26676913
Boyden Gate House	II	Boyden Gate			14 March 1980	TR2206365595; 51°20′46″N 1°11′14″E		1336523	Upload Photo	Q26621007
Endeavour Kosi Kot	II	Boyden Gate			14 March 1980	TR2206965528; 51°20′44″N 1°11′14″E		1101750	Upload Photo	Q26395516
Shersby Cottage	II	Boyden Gate			14 March 1980	TR2226565717; 51°20′49″N 1°11′25″E		1101460	Upload Photo	Q26394908
Gray's Farmhouse	II	Brook Lane			6 May 1974	TR2276667598; 51°21′49″N 1°11′55″E		1084996	Upload Photo	Q26370226
Tudor House	II*	Chislet Forstal			29 September 1952	TR2165964039; 51°19′56″N 1°10′50″E		1084381	Upload Photo	Q17556991
Chitty Farmhouse	II	Chitty Lane, Chitty Farm			14 March 1980	TR2285664670; 51°20′15″N 1°11′53″E		1085651	Upload Photo	Q26373653
Holmleigh	II	Chitty Lane			6 June 1980	TR2283564612; 51°20′13″N 1°11′52″E		1241667	Upload Photo	Q26534527
Invicta Cottages	II	Chitty Lane, Chitty			14 March 1980	TR2304164736; 51°20′17″N 1°12′03″E		1336524	Upload Photo	Q26621008
The Old School House	II	Chitty Lane, Marshside			13 May 1976	TR2306564784; 51°20′18″N 1°12′04″E		1085652	Upload Photo	Q26373659
Chislet Court	II	Church Lane			30 January 1967	TR2247464385; 51°20′06″N 1°11′33″E		1336526	Upload Photo	Q26621010
Church Cottage Manor Cottage	II	Church Lane			14 March 1980	TR2240364327; 51°20′04″N 1°11′29″E		1085654	Upload Photo	Q26373665
Church of St Mary the Virgin	I	Church Lane	church building		30 January 1967	TR2245064308; 51°20′04″N 1°11′31″E		1085653	Church of St Mary the Virgin More images	Q17529548
Oasthouses at Chislet Court	II	Church Lane			14 March 1980	TR2248764415; 51°20′07″N 1°11′34″E		1085655	Upload Photo	Q26373670
Highstead Farmhouse	II	Highstead			14 March 1980	TR2125566212; 51°21′07″N 1°10′34″E		1083581	Upload Photo	Q26365797
Thatched Cottage and Peg Cottage	II	Highstead			14 March 1980	TR2141966216; 51°21′07″N 1°10′42″E		1336527	Upload Photo	Q26621011
Hollow Street Cottages	II	1-4, Hollow Street			14 March 1980	TR2213064106; 51°19′57″N 1°11′14″E		1085659	Upload Photo	Q26373692
26, Island Road	II	26, Island Road, Upstreet, CT3 4DA			30 January 1967	TR2262862910; 51°19′18″N 1°11′37″E		1083589	Upload Photo	Q26365837
The Vision House	II	89, Island Road, Upstreet			14 March 1980	TR2285663184; 51°19′27″N 1°11′50″E		1085658	Upload Photo	Q26373686
Grove Court	II	94 and 94a, Island Road, Upstreet			30 January 1967	TR2300563217; 51°19′28″N 1°11′58″E		1338849	Upload Photo	Q26623139
Brick Barn to South West of Port Farmhouse	II	Island Road, Upstreet			18 November 1985	TR2247262620; 51°19′09″N 1°11′29″E		1260416	Upload Photo	Q26551433
Port Farmhouse	II	Island Road, Upstreet, Port Farm			30 January 1967	TR2249462667; 51°19′10″N 1°11′30″E		1336528	Upload Photo	Q26621012
Upstreet Farmhouse	II	Island Road, Upstreet Farm			14 March 1980	TR2340563457; 51°19′35″N 1°12′19″E		1336529	Upload Photo	Q26621013
Wallend Farm Cottage	II	Island Road			10 July 1985	TR2401063824; 51°19′46″N 1°12′51″E		1336599	Upload Photo	Q26621082
Barn at Little Grays	II	Marshside, Little Grays			14 March 1980	TR2277467460; 51°21′45″N 1°11′55″E		1085662	Upload Photo	Q26373708
Central Barn at Home Farm	II	Marshside			7 April 1989	TR2231966072; 51°21′01″N 1°11′29″E		1085438	Upload Photo	Q26372560
Huggesson's Farmhouse	II	Marshside			14 March 1980	TR2231066011; 51°20′59″N 1°11′28″E		1085660	Upload Photo	Q26373696
Keel Farmhouse	II	Marshside, Keel Farm			14 March 1980	TR2243066720; 51°21′22″N 1°11′36″E		1336530	Upload Photo	Q26621014
Little Grays	II	Marshside, Little Grays			14 March 1980	TR2275467445; 51°21′45″N 1°11′54″E		1346202	Upload Photo	Q26629772
Marshside Farmhouse	II	Marshside, Marshside Farm			14 March 1980	TR2231065841; 51°20′53″N 1°11′28″E		1338847	Upload Photo	Q26623138
North Barn at Home Farm	II	Marshside			7 April 1989	TR2232166094; 51°21′01″N 1°11′29″E		1260427	Upload Photo	Q26551441
Old Mead Farmhouse	II	Marshside			14 March 1980	TR2241066680; 51°21′20″N 1°11′35″E		1084347	Upload Photo	Q26367989
South Barn at Home Farm	II	Marshside			7 April 1989	TR2232666040; 51°21′00″N 1°11′29″E		1260428	Upload Photo	Q26551442
The Blandings	II	Marshside			28 June 1976	TR2243866835; 51°21′25″N 1°11′36″E		1085661	Upload Photo	Q26373702
The Old Barn	II	North Stream, Marshside, CT3 4EE, Boyden Gate			14 March 1980	TR2229265736; 51°20′50″N 1°11′26″E		1336505	Upload Photo	Q26620993
Brick Granary, Stables and Interconnecting Rear Wall on South East of Port Farmhouse	II	Island Road			18 November 1985	TR2252362638; 51°19′09″N 1°11′31″E		1336600	Upload Photo	Q26621083
Tipper House	II	Tipper Lane, Marshside			14 March 1980	TR2265665350; 51°20′37″N 1°11′44″E		1336525	Upload Photo	Q26621009
The Snuggery	II	1 and 2, Under The Wood			14 March 1980	TR2182666539; 51°21′17″N 1°11′04″E		1084316	Upload Photo	Q26367951
Walnut Tree Farmhouse	II	Walnut Tree Farm			14 March 1980	TR2134266160; 51°21′05″N 1°10′38″E		1085656	Upload Photo	Q26373675

== See also ==
- Grade I listed buildings in Kent
- Grade II* listed buildings in Kent

== Sources ==
- Newman, John (2013) [1969], Kent: North-East and East, The Buildings of England, New Haven and London: Yale University Press, ISBN 978-0-300-18506-5
