= Listed buildings in Westbere =

Civil Parish in Kent, England

Westbere is a village and civil parish in the City of Canterbury district of Kent, England. It contains 16 listed buildings that are recorded in the National Heritage List for England. Of these one is grade I, one is grade II* and 14 are grade II.

This list is based on the information retrieved online from Historic England.

== Key ==
Grade	Criteria
I	Buildings that are of exceptional interest
II*	Particularly important buildings of more than special interest
II	Buildings that are of special interest

== Listing ==
Name	Grade	Location	Type	Completed (Note: The date given is the date used by Historic England as significant for the initial building or that of an important part in the structure's description.)	Date designated	Grid ref. (Note: The grid reference is based on the British national grid reference system, sometimes known as OSGB36, used by the Ordnance Survey.) Geo-coordinates	Notes	Entry number (Note: The "List Entry Number" is a unique number assigned to each listed building and scheduled monument by Historic England.)	Image	Wikidata
Church of All Saints	I	Church Lane	church building		30 January 1967	TR1922361073; 51°18′24″N 1°08′38″E		1085482	Church of All Saints More images	Q17529523
Walnut Tree Farmhouse	II	1, Walnut Tree Lane			14 March 1980	TR1946461054; 51°18′23″N 1°08′50″E		1336606	Upload Photo	Q26621089
Barn and Granary to North East of Walnut Tree Farmhouse	II	Walnut Tree Lane			14 March 1980	TR1949161076; 51°18′23″N 1°08′52″E		1054868	Upload Photo	Q26306516
K6 Telephone Kiosk at the Junction of Bushy Hill Road	II	Walnut Tree Lane			17 February 1989	TR1944661053; 51°18′23″N 1°08′49″E		1241671	Upload Photo	Q26534531
Stable at East of Walnut Tree Farmhouse	II	Walnut Tree Lane			14 March 1980	TR1948961056; 51°18′23″N 1°08′51″E		1085484	Upload Photo	Q26372798
Westbere Cottage	II	20, Westbere Lane	thatched cottage		14 March 1980	TR1920860996; 51°18′21″N 1°08′37″E		1085488	Westbere Cottage More images	Q26372819
26 and 28, Westbere Lane	II	26 and 28, Westbere Lane			14 March 1980	TR1934461018; 51°18′22″N 1°08′44″E		1367084	Upload Photo	Q26648616
Kemphall Farmhouse	II	29, Westbere Lane			30 January 1967	TR1931761033; 51°18′22″N 1°08′43″E		1054876	Upload Photo	Q26306522
North Cottages	II	35 and 37, Westbere Lane			14 March 1980	TR1936361048; 51°18′23″N 1°08′45″E		1054840	Upload Photo	Q26306493
White Cottage Yew Tree Cottage	II	41, Westbere Lane			14 March 1980	TR1939661046; 51°18′22″N 1°08′47″E		1085486	Upload Photo	Q26372808
Ashby Cottage	II	Westbere Lane	thatched cottage		2 May 1978	TR1914160966; 51°18′20″N 1°08′33″E		1085487	Ashby Cottage More images	Q26372814
Barn at Kemphall Farm	II	Westbere Lane			14 March 1980	TR1930261056; 51°18′23″N 1°08′42″E		1085485	Upload Photo	Q26372803
Garden Wall to Westbere House	II	Westbere Lane			14 March 1980	TR1922461010; 51°18′21″N 1°08′38″E		1336607	Upload Photo	Q26621090
Laurel Cottage	II	Westbere Lane			14 March 1980	TR1916460965; 51°18′20″N 1°08′34″E		1054846	Upload Photo	Q26306498
Westbere House	II*	Westbere Lane	house		29 September 1952	TR1925461036; 51°18′22″N 1°08′39″E		1367055	Westbere House More images	Q17557277
Ye Olde Yew Tree Inn	II	Westbere Lane	pub		29 September 1952	TR1939661028; 51°18′22″N 1°08′47″E		1085489	Ye Olde Yew Tree Inn More images	Q26372825

== See also ==
- Grade I listed buildings in Kent
- Grade II* listed buildings in Kent

== Sources ==
- Newman, John (2013) [1969], Kent: North-East and East, The Buildings of England, New Haven and London: Yale University Press, ISBN 978-0-300-18506-5
