= St Nicholas' Church, Sturry =

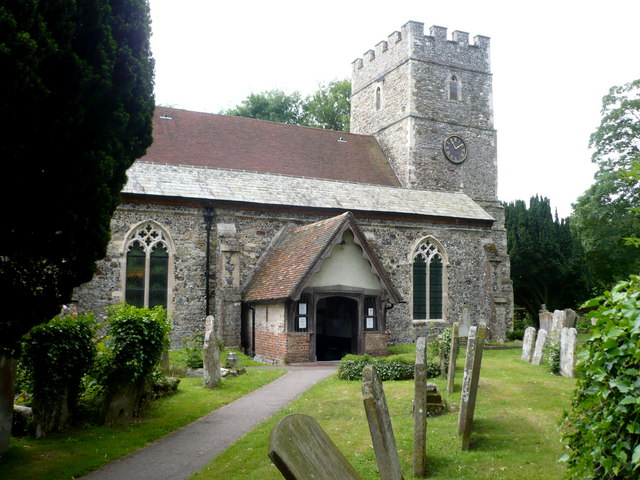
- The church with its embattlemented tower
- St Nicholas' Church, Sturry
- 51°17′55″N 1°07′13″E
- OS grid reference: TR 176 606
- Location: Sturry, Kent
- Country: England
- Denomination: Anglican and Methodist

History
- Dedication: St Nicholas

Architecture
- Architectural type: Church
- Style: Norman

Specifications
- Materials: Stone, with stone slate roofs

St Nicholas' Church, Sturry, is a joint Anglican and Methodist church standing on a bank beside the River Stour, in the village of Sturry, near Canterbury, in East Kent. The Local Ecumenical Partnership enables the congregation to be of mixed denomination - either Methodist or Anglican.

The large parish of St Nicholas incorporates the villages of Sturry with Fordwich and Westbere with Hersden.

In 1965 the church was Grade I listed by English Heritage.

== History ==
=== Early history ===
The first records of a church are from around 690AD. King Wihtred gave Sturry (then called Stour-gau) to the Abbess of Minster-in-Thanet. It is likely that the church then was built on the present site. In 1011AD the Danes invaded and destroyed Minister. Sturry was given to St Augustine's Abbey in Canterbury by the Danish King Cnut.

The actual stone church buildings were first built in the Norman times. (It is not clear whether the Saxon church was stone or timber). The Normans constructed a long rectangular nave with a smaller rectangle at the east end for a chancel with an altar and a square tower at the west end. As typical of Norman churches, Sturry church had a north door and a south door opposite each other and high windows; three each side in the nave and two each side in the chancel. The tower was built in three stages, rather like a castle keep. It was recorded in the 1086AD Domesday Book as such, and remained so until about the year 1200, when it was decided that the church was too dark and narrow. Two aisles, north and south were built either side of the nave, and arches were knocked into the nave walls. The Norman windows were blocked up - although their traces remain in the stonework above the arches, and the entrance to the tower was enlarged to match the style of the arches.

In 1230AD, the chancel was refurbished with double-lancet windows in the south and east walls and a single-lancet window in the north wall. An aumbry (a small cupboard for the chalice, paten and other precious items), a piscina (a niche with a shelf and a drain for washing communion vessels), seats for the clergy (where the present wooden seats are) and a sacristy were built. The sacristy is a small room off the north wall of the chancel. Sometime in the 13th century there were also two other considerable building operations in Sturry church. These consisted of enlarging the chancel arch and erecting the spire on top of the tower. The chancel arch almost certainly took place first, and involved taking down the original Norman arch and building a higher and wider pointed arch. The builders re-used the original Norman stone columns on square bases and they are still to be seen today. The spire was an ingenious feat of carpentry work with wooden shingles on the outside - similarly constructed to the spire of St Mary's church, Fordwich.

The north aisle was widened in about 1370 and three new windows were put in along the wall and two wider ones at the ends of the aisle. These are the most elaborate windows in the church with highly decorated stained glass. On the outside, the drip mouldings (which keep the rain off) are neatly finished with carved heads and comic faces. Many are simply nameless creations of stone, but the Abbot of St Augustine's and the king are present at the west end. The font, used for baptism of water, was originally placed by the westernmost pillar in the north aisle. In the pillar, a niche called a chrismatory was built for the jar of holy oil and the candle that the priest would use in the ceremony. The font dates back to the late 12th or early 13th centuries, but the decorated ledge around the top was added during the Tudor era, clearly shown by the Tudor roses. Under the east window in the north aisle is an altar dedicated to Our Lady.

The south aisle was widened much later than the north aisle, during the reign of Henry VII, in 1490. It was the fashion then to square off drip mouldings and although some carved heads were added, the weather on the south side has been harsher than the north, and erosion has ruined many of the faces. The altar in the south aisle is dedicated to the Holy Trinity. Thomas Childmel is buried in the south aisle in 1496 after he donated some lead to cover the roof.

=== 1500-1800 ===
In 1500, both of the aisles and their chapels had altars and furniture - although there were no pews or chairs, the congregation sat or stood on the stone flags (there may have been a few benches). Across the chancel was a beam, beneath which there was a screen to keep small children and stray animals out from the chancel and sanctuary. On the beam stood the Rood (the crucified Christ with Our Lady and St. John) as on the reredos which stood until 1972 on the east wall of the chancel. There was no pulpit and priests stood on the chancel step to address the congregation. From 1527 the Reformation began and the altars, the lights and the screen were taken away. However, moveable altar tables, pews and the pulpit were introduced.

The Sturry Churchwarden's Accounts begin in 1716 and describe the interior of the church for the mid-18th century with high-panelled box pews, the reading desk, pulpit, wooden communion table and a west gallery for the singers, built in 1744. They also describe how the Royal Arms were painted onto a board and hung high above the chancel arch; the same done for the Creed, the Lord's Prayer and the Ten Commandments either side of the east window.

=== Since 1800 ===
In the early 19th century, in 1812 or 1813, the church's spire fell down (or was taken down). It caused a little damage to the tower, but it was rebuilt with battlements. (Note that the top of the tower is not a perfect square). At the same time, the old porch, built in Tudor times, was in need of repair and the walls were rebuilt using brick and the roof was redone. Some of the old timber beams are still visible on the inside. Later on in the 19th century, all the wooden panelling was removed and the altar was moved back to the east wall. Nowadays, there is a wooden moveable altar table in the same place. The present arrangement of pulpit and choir stalls were set up, and the reredos was moved to a place just behind the chancel. It was taken down again however on 3 June 1972 by men from the congregation. On the back of one of the stone uprights, it was written that the reredos had been constructed on 3 December 1867 by a mason from London. It was replaced by a mustard-yellow curtain which in turn was removed in 2007 due to mildew and damp and now the bare stone wall behind the altar is decorated only by the central wood and brass cross.

== See also ==
- Church of St Mary the Virgin, Fordwich
