= Marshside, Kent =

Hamlet in Kent, England

Coordinates: 51.3508°N 1.1931°E

Marshside
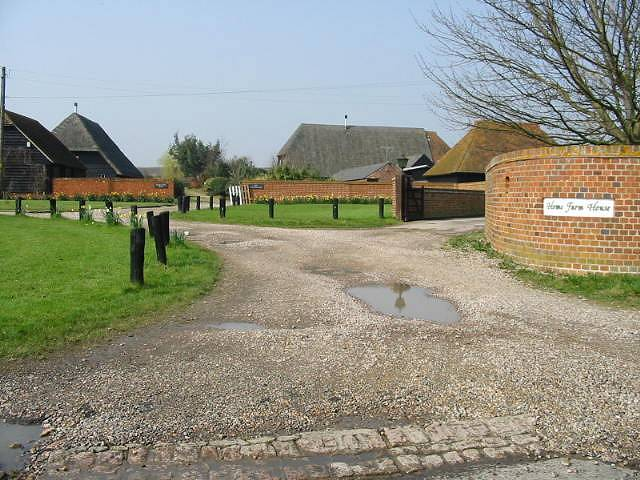
- Home Farm, Marshside

- Location within Kent
- OS grid reference: TR224661
- Civil parish: Chislet
- District: City of Canterbury
- Shire county: Kent
- Region: South East
- Country: England
- Sovereign state: United Kingdom
- Post town: CANTERBURY
- Postcode district: CT3
- Dialling code: 01227
- Police: Kent
- Fire: Kent
- Ambulance: South East Coast
- UK Parliament: Herne Bay and Sandwich

Marshside is a hamlet in the county of Kent, England. It is in the parish of Chislet alongside the Chislet Marshes southeast of Herne Bay.

== Governance ==
An electoral ward in the same name exists with the most populous parish being Sturry. The population of this ward at the 2011 Census was 3.302.
