= Gallagher Group (UK) =

British civil engineering company

Gallagher Group Limited
- Formerly: Gallagher Holdings (Kent) Limited (1988–2003)
- Industry: Housebuilding, civil engineering, quarrying and property business
- Founded: 1973
- Headquarters: Aylesford, Kent, UK
- Key people: Pat Gallagher Chairman; Lance Taylor, CEO
- Operating income: £50 million (2013)
- Net income: £40.9 million (2012)
- Number of employees: 300 (2013)
- Website: gallagher-group.co.uk

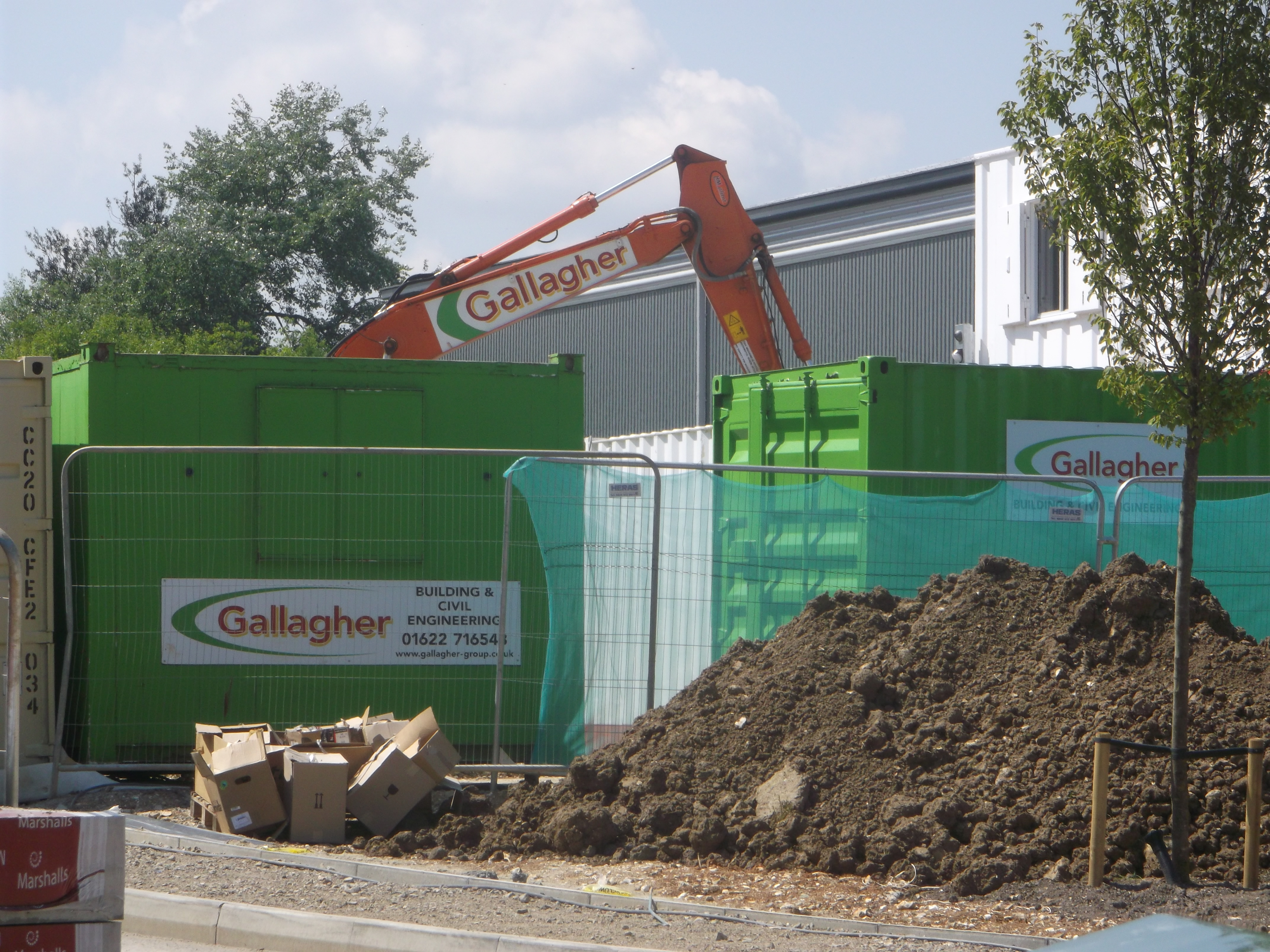
Gallagher Building and Civil Engineering Site Offices on Campus Way, Gillingham

Gallagher Group Limited started as a civil engineering and groundworks contractor. Then operated civil engineering, property development, 'design and build' contracting and quarrying businesses.

== History ==
Pat Gallagher (the chairman of Gallagher) was born in County Leitrim, Ireland (as part of a grocer family). The family and Pat (aged 17) left Ireland and moved to the village of Aylesford to live with his aunt. Pat started working for Jubilee Clips in Gilingham before going to work with Aylesford Sewage works. His father Patrick was killed after falling into a tank. After her husband's death, his mother moved back to Ireland. He decided to stay in Kent. He then drove a digger for builder Pat Burke, now his best friend, who advised him there was enough work for everyone. The young Gallagher bought that digger for £2000 and that started his construction career.

I didn’t want to work for anyone but be free to do my own thing," he said. "In those days, it was all about learning a trade. If you had a trade, you were made for life. Today it’s about going to university

Three of his four children – Stephen, Richard and Lyndsey – are also involved in the business.

== Business ==
Gallagher Group has a unique mix of distinct but complementary services

- Building (including foundations)
- Civil engineering
- Plant and Transport
- Construction materials (primary and recycled)
- Kentish Ragstone building stone
- Ready-mix concrete and flowing screed
- Landfill and restoration
- Property development
- Farming and estate management

== Known Projects ==
- Scania Maidstone Depot
- Nepicar Park, Wrotham
- Rainham Mark Grammar School
- Spires Academy
- Maidstone United F.C.’s Gallagher Stadium
- Kent Institute of Medicine and Surgery
- Eclipse Park (office park near Maidstone)
- Mote Park
- Hermitage Court, Barming
- Hermitage Quarry
- Eureka Skyway (pedestrian bridge over M20 near Ashford)

== Charities ==
Heart of Kent Hospice, Preston Hall, Royal British Legion Village, Aylesford
