= St Margaret's Church, Canterbury =

Former church in Kent, England

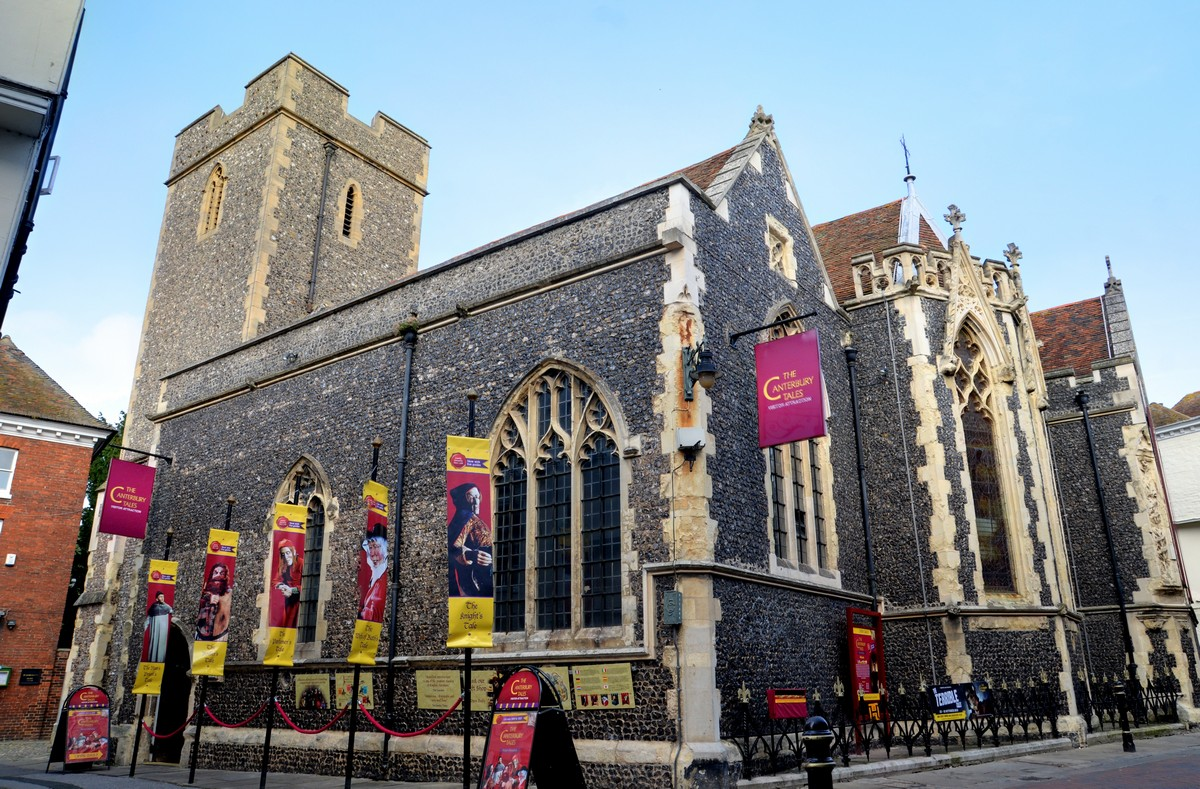
- St Margaret's Church, Canterbury
- 51°16′41.88″N 1°04′46.96″E
- OS grid reference: TR 14887 57741
- Location: Canterbury
- Country: England
- Website: www.canterburytales.co.uk

Listed Building – Grade II*
- Official name: Church of St Margaret
- Designated: 3 December 1949
- Reference no.: 1241922

St Margaret's Church is a former Anglican church within the city walls in Canterbury, Kent. The earliest parts date from the 12th century; there were modifications in the 14th century and restoration about 1850. It is Grade II* listed. The church became redundant in 1942, and since 1988 it has housed the Canterbury Tales visitor attraction.

== History and description ==
The church is built of knapped flint with stone dressings, with a tiled roof. There is a nave, north and south aisles, a chancel and a tower in the south-west.

It was built over the north-west end of the remains of Roman public baths. Excavation in the 1980s showed that the part under the church consisted of a portico with tessellated pavement, fronting onto a Roman street. There was no trace of an Anglo-Saxon church; the stone church was built in the 12th century.

The earliest part is the west doorway, although this was much restored in the 19th century. The church was rebuilt in the late 14th century. The north and south walls were rebuilt further out; the original location of the walls was found during excavation. The east end once extended under the present St Margaret's Street. The lower stage of the tower dates from this time.

=== 18th century and later ===
In 1791, the east end was truncated to widen the road and improve access to the nearby Fountain Inn.

The church was heavily restored about 1850 by George Gilbert Scott. Traceried windows in decorated style were fitted. The chancel was made into a polygonal apse. The west doorway was restored. The aisles, originally with sloping roofs, were given heightened walls and pitched roofs. The arcades were reconstructed, although late medieval details survive. Other modifications included the addition of a vestry, and central heating with underfloor ducts.

The upper part of the tower was rebuilt after bomb damage in 1942.

=== Monuments ===
There are many monuments: these include include mural monuments in the north aisle to William Somner, and to John Wynter (died 1470), Mayor of Canterbury; there is a large wall monument to George Newman at the east end of the south aisle.

=== Bells ===
There were three bells recorded in 1552. They were later recast, two by Thomas Hatch in 1599 and 1625, the other by Samuel Goslin in 1903. The bells were removed in 1968, and transferred to other churches after recasting: the treble to St Peter's Church in Canterbury, the middle bell to the Church of St Mary and All Saints, Droxford, Hampshire, and the tenor to the Church of St Peter and St Paul, Newchurch, Kent.

=== The Canterbury Tales ===
The Canterbury Tales visitor attraction closed in April 2020 due to the COVID-19 pandemic. It was redesigned, and re-opened in March 2026. Lewis Hunt, who designed it with Mica Dougan, said: "We want... to show other visitor attractions what can be achieved using state of the art technology to create an immersive visitor experience".

== See also ==
- Grade II* listed buildings in City of Canterbury
- List of tourist attractions in Kent
