= Canterbury Guildhall =

Municipal building in Canterbury, Kent, England

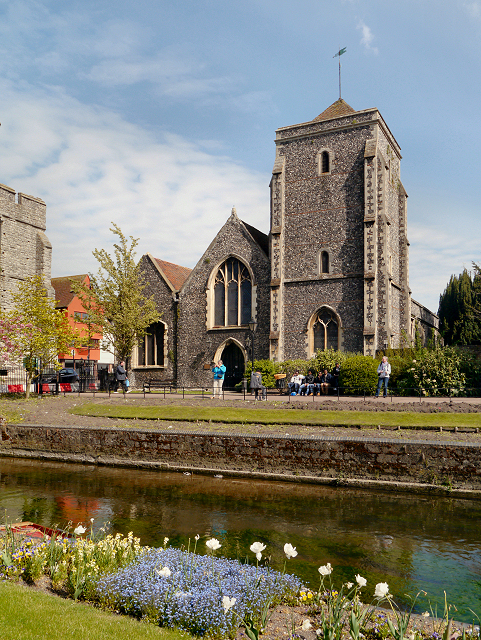
- Canterbury Guildhall

- Shown in Kent
- 51.2813°N 1.0757°E
- Location: St Peter's Place, Canterbury

History
- Built: 1381

Site notes
- Architectural style: Gothic style

Listed Building – Grade II*
- Official name: Church of the Holy Cross
- Designated: 3 December 1949
- Reference no.: 1241661

Canterbury Guildhall, formerly the Church of the Holy Cross, is a municipal building in St Peter's Place in Canterbury, Kent, England. The structure, which is the meeting place of Canterbury City Council, is a Grade II* listed building.

== History ==
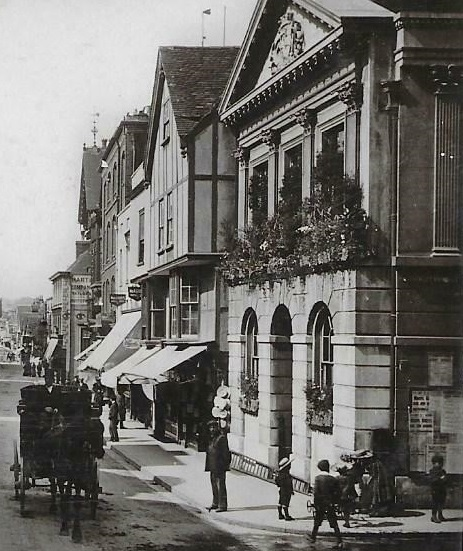
The original guildhall at the corner of High Street and Guildhall Street

The original guildhall in Canterbury was located at the corner of High Street and Guildhall Street and was completed in 1180. The building, which was rebuilt in 1437, 1688 and 1697, was used as a venue for magistrates court hearings and hosted a concert at which the young composer, Wolfgang Amadeus Mozart, performed one of his pieces in 1765.

The building in the High Street was remodelled in the neoclassical style in ashlar stone in 1835. The design involved a symmetrical main frontage with three bays facing onto the High Street; the ground floor featured a rounded headed doorway flanked by two round headed windows. There were sash windows on the first floor flanked by Corinthian order pilasters supporting an entablature and a heavily modillioned pediment with a coat of arms in the tympanum. Internally, the principal room was the main hall, which was decorated with pikes, matchlocks and other weapons seized by Parliamentary Forces from Lady Wootton's house at St Augustine's Abbey, as well as a portrait of Queen Anne by Thomas Gibbs. When Frederick Temple became Archbishop of Canterbury in 1896, he was given an enthusiastic reception by the mayor and the corporation of the city at the guildhall.

The building was primarily used as a venue for civic events after council officers and their departments moved to the Municipal Buildings in Marlowe Avenue. The remodelling carried out in the 19th century involved poor construction which led to the flint walls being declared unstable. Despite considerable controversy at the time, with the exception of the undercroft which still survives, the guildhall was demolished in 1950.

Meanwhile, the Church of the Holy Cross near the Westgate, had been commissioned by Archbishop Simon Sudbury and completed before his death in 1381. The design of the church, which originally formed part of the St Gregory's Priory, involved a nave, a chancel and two aisles, and there was a square tower facing northwest towards the River Stour.

After the church was declared redundant and de-consecrated in 1972, it was acquired by the city council and converted for municipal use: it was officially re-opened by the Prince of Wales as the new Guildhall and meeting place of the city council on 9 November 1978. In May 2021, the city council announced aspirations to secure funding for a scheme which would link the guildhall with other heritage assets in the immediate area such as Westgate and would also involve the council chamber becoming a visitor attraction.

== See also ==
- Grade II* listed buildings in City of Canterbury
