= Boyden Gate =

Settlement in Kent, England

Coordinates: 51.3465°N 1.1885°E

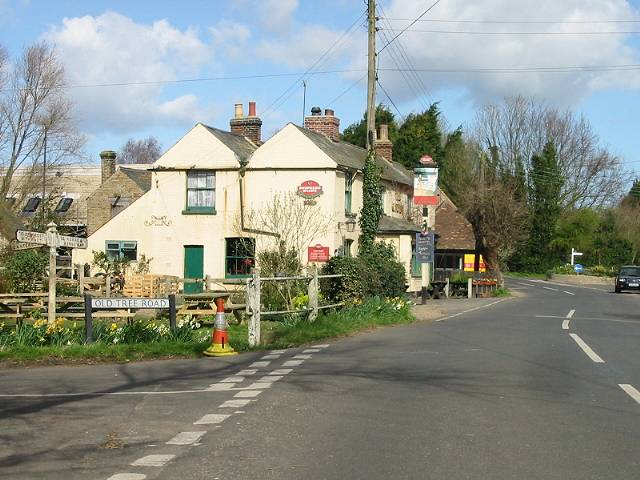
- The Gate Inn, Boyden Gate

- Location within Kent
- OS grid reference: TR2265
- Shire county: Kent
- Region: South East
- Country: England
- Sovereign state: United Kingdom
- Police: Kent
- Fire: Kent
- Ambulance: South East Coast

Boyden Gate is a village in the civil parish of Chislet in Kent, England.
