= Fordwich =

Market town in Kent, England

Coordinates: 51.295°N 1.126°E

- Fordwich bridge, Fordwich

- Location within Kent
- Area: 1.81 km^{2} (0.70 sq mi)
- Population: 372 (2021)
  - Density: 206/km^{2} (530/sq mi)
- OS grid reference: TR179597
  - London: 65.8 miles
- Civil parish: Fordwich
- District: City of Canterbury
- Shire county: Kent
- Region: South East
- Country: England
- Sovereign state: United Kingdom
- Post town: Canterbury
- Postcode district: CT2
- Dialling code: 01227
- Police: Kent
- Fire: Kent
- Ambulance: South East Coast
- UK Parliament: Herne Bay and Sandwich

Fordwich /ˈfɔːrdwɪtʃ/ is a town and a civil parish in east Kent, England, on the River Stour, northeast of Canterbury. It is the smallest community by population in Britain with a town council.

== History ==
=== Toponymy ===
The name Fordwich derives from the Old English fordwīc meaning 'trading settlement at the ford'.

=== Prehistory ===
Fordwich traces back to prehistory. Hand axes dated to the Lower Palaeolithic have been found in multiple archaeological excavations of the town. Notably, Moat Rough in Fordwich holds archaeological interest as the ground has been left fallow for decades. Archaic scrapers confirm the possible presence of the early and poorly understood Homo heidelbergensis.

=== Middle Ages ===
Fordwich is first mentioned in the charter of Hlothhere of Kent in 675, and later by Eadric of Kent in 686. Both relate to determining the boundaries for a grant in Stodmarsh. In 866, the Augustine Abbot gained a small area of six houses, three acres of land and a meadow in Fordwich. By 1055, St. Augustine Abbot was granted two thirds of the land by Edward the Confessor. A decade later, a share previously owned by Earl Goodwin and then granted to Odo of Bayeux was granted the Augustine Abbot To gain the favour of the Normans, Abbot Egelsin abdicated his post in 1070 and the land went to the of the Sherif of Kent, Hamo de Crevequer. However, Fordwich was restored back to the monastery on the bidding of William The Conqueror to Archbishop Lanfranc.

By the Domesday Book in 1086, Fordwich had 6 burgesses, smaller than most settlements recorded, and referred to as "The little borough of Fordwich." Conflict between the burgesses, known as freemen or property owning citizens, and monks of St. Augustine monastery is recorded in 1184; the two forces went to the King’s Court of Henry II, settling in favour of the monastery. From a charter of Henry II, Fordwich gained greater rights and a mayor, the earliest known named mayor was John Maynard in 1292, and became established as the corporate limb of Sandwich Cinque Ports The Corporation of Fordwich consisted of a mayor, jurats, and freemen.

=== Modern period ===
In 1520, there was conflict between the Abbot of Augustine and the mayor relating to the respective rights in the fishery and waterways. The abbot had erected a hedge, which blocked vessels to the quays. The matter was brought to Lord Poynings, Lord Warden of the Cinque Ports, and an appeal was sent to the Abbot to restore the passage for Fordwich. St. Augustine monastery was stripped away in 1538, which saw ownership of Fordwich transfer to Henry VIII. In 1553, the manor was granted to Sir Thomas Cheney by King Edward VI.

As the River Stour filled with slit during the 15th and 16th century, the fishing trade began to decline. By 1563, the population saw a noticeable drop to 120. As the Great Plague ravaged London in 1605, Shakespeare on Tour performed for 10 shilling at the Fordwich Town Hall.

The mayor of Fordwich and Christopher Lord Teynham went to court in 1621 over the fishing rights in Fordwich. In 1653, Fordwich gained repute from Izaak Walton for the large "Fordidge trout", which became a local delicacy. However, later sources suggest it to be a "salmon trout." or "sea trout" Complaints were issued against various Fordwich residents in 1669 for avoiding common fines.

In the Meadows of Fordwich: 1840

The brick bridge over the River Stour in Fordwich was built in the 18th century. Gentleman Paul Johnson held a mansion in Fordwich in 1749 George Coutham made a small name for himself in the early 1820s for boxing by the marshes of Fordwich and attracting crowds

In 1824, a bullock charged from Sturry to Fordwich, resulting in a man of the name Hooker to be gored in the face by the beast and people tossed and injured while in the bull’s path. Multiple shots were fired, but unsuccessful. It only was until the bull was wading through River Stour that local butchers seized it by the nostril and plunged a knife into its throat.

In 1825, a soap maker in Fordwich brought action against a wealthy man for the seduction of his daughter. The plaintiff was a respected family man in Fordwich, while the defendant was a wealthy, well-connected young man. The defendant had met the daughter while being introduced to the family. The defendant pressured premarital sex under the guise of potential marriage. She fell pregnant, and marriage was delayed before abandoned. In court, the verdict was the defendant to pay 50 pounds in damages.

Fordwich Meadows: 1889

Along the marshes of Broad Oak road, a new system was constructed for sewage in 1842. The system allowed any manure to escape by an outfall drain and into the river below Fordwich. Lime in the new precipitating tanks water-works was thrown into the River Stour in 1871. In Fordwich, it resulted in fish suffocating as the water thickened, the bodies sinking the bottom.

In 1883, a man became gravely injured after attempting to destroy a wasp nest after gunpowder exploded and resulted in the amputation of one of his hands. Fordwich lost its status as a town with passage of the Municipal Corporations Act 1883. In reorganisation during 1974, Fordwich regained town status.

== Landmarks ==
Fordwich has 29 listed buildings. 26 are grade II, two are grade II* and one is grade I.

=== St Mary’s Church ===
Church of St Mary the Virgin, Fordwich is a grade I listed mediaeval church along The Drove northeast of the town. The church has Norman features, with Anglo-Saxon work on the nave. The Walls paintings and fittings found in the church date to the 7th century. The Fordwich stone is believed to be a shrine for the body of a saint dated to 1100. Before permanent residence in 1877, the stone was often taken and showcased in Canterbury Cathedral.

=== Fordwich Town Hall ===
Fordwich Town Hall is a grade II* listed post-medieval municipal building dated 1544 along King Street, Fordwich. The building contains a courtroom, prison and store with stocks outside. The last people convicted in hall were two men in 1855 for poaching. As town lost its municipal status in 1883, the building now serves as the main parish hall.

=== Fordwich Bridge ===
Fordwich bridge is a bridge over the River Stour is a grade II listed structure. It leads to local villages and hamlets such as Grove Ferry, Sarre pen and Plucks Gutter. It was first built in the 17th century, though may date earlier. In 1940, there was a road block at Fordwich Bridge, which is present today. The sight of Canoes may be spotted along the Stour.

== Sports ==
Water sports in Fordwich is offered along the River Stour by Canoe Wild. Services that can be hired range from the canoe, kayak and paddleboard.

Canterbury Golf Course is a golf course in Fordwich established in 1927 on a field used as practice trenches by the Royal East Kent Regiment in World War I. The land is around 160 acres, and has hosted events such The Ladies' Home International matches and English Men’s Amateur Championship. The course was designed by Harry Colt.

== Demographics ==
At the 2021 census, the parish had a population of 372 people in 159 households, with a gender ratio of 52.2% female to 47.8% male, and 82.8% of residents were born in the UK.

Census population of Fordwich parish
Census	Population	Female	Male	Households	Source
2001	351	190	161	147	
2011	381	197	184	160	
2021	372	193	179	159	

Ethnic groups:

- White 91.7%
- Mixed or Multiple ethnic groups 3.8%
- Asian, Asian British or Asian Welsh 3.5%
- Black, Black British, Black Welsh, Caribbean or African 1.1%

Religion:

- Christian 54.2%
- No religion 36.2%
- Not answered 5.4%
- Buddhist 1.9%
- Jewish 1.3%
- Muslim 1.1%

Legal partnership status:

- Married or in a registered civil partnership 54.0%
- Never married and never registered a civil partnership 31.9%
- Widowed or surviving civil partnership partner 6.3%
- Divorced or civil partnership dissolved 5.4%
- Separated, but still legally married or still legally in a civil partnership 2.4%

Household composition:

- Single family household 72.1%
- One person household 23.0%
- Other household types 4.8%

== Media ==
Local news and television programmes are provided by BBC South East and ITV Meridian. Television signals are received from Dover transmitting station. Local radio stations are BBC Radio Kent, Heart South, and KMFM Canterbury, a community based station that broadcast from Canterbury. The town is served by the local newspaper, Kentish Gazette.

== See also ==
- Broughton in Furness with as few as 529 residents
- Stockbridge in Hampshire, with a population of 592
- Manningtree in Essex, another claimant for smallest town in England, with 700 people in 20 hectares
- Llanwrtyd Wells in Wales, another claimant for smallest town in Britain, has a population of 850
