= KIMS Hospital, Maidstone =

KIMS Hospital
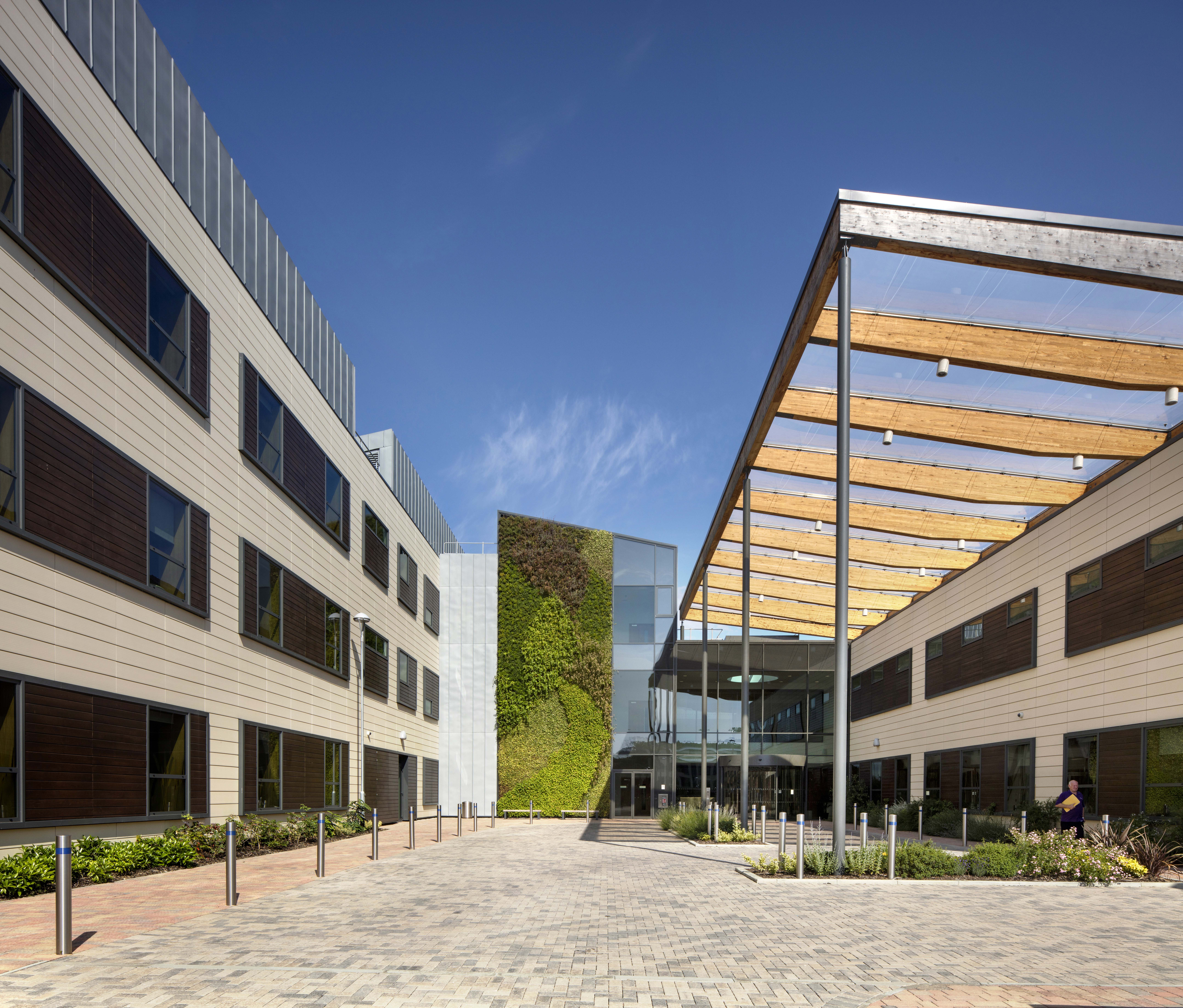
- KIMS Hospital Main Entrance

- Shown in Kent

Geography
- Location: Maidstone, Kent, England
- Coordinates: 51.28615°N 0.55662°E

Organisation
- Care system: Private

Services
- Emergency department: No

History
- Founded: 2014

KIMS Hospital, formerly the Kent Institute of Medicine and Surgery, is the largest independent private hospital in Kent. It is situated in Maidstone and treats privately insured, self-funding and NHS patients. Primary specialties are orthopaedic surgery, cardiology, gynecology, breast surgery and general surgery. The hospital is situated on the Kent Medical Campus, off Junction 7 of the M20 Motorway. LycaHealth, which owns medical centres in Orpington and Canary Wharf, became its majority shareholder in October 2021.

== History ==
The hospital, which was designed by David Morley Architects and built by Vinci Construction, opened in 2014. The hospital acquired Sevenoaks Medical Centre in January 2020 to offer private and NHS consultations, and diagnostic services. LycaHealth acquired a majority stake in KIMS Hospital in October 2021.

== Awards ==
In 2023, the Hospital’s Theatre Department was awarded the Association for Perioperative Practice (AfPP) accreditation for high standards of patient safety across their five theatres.
