= Anvil Green =

Hamlet in Kent, England

Coordinates: 51°12′25″N 1°0′57″E

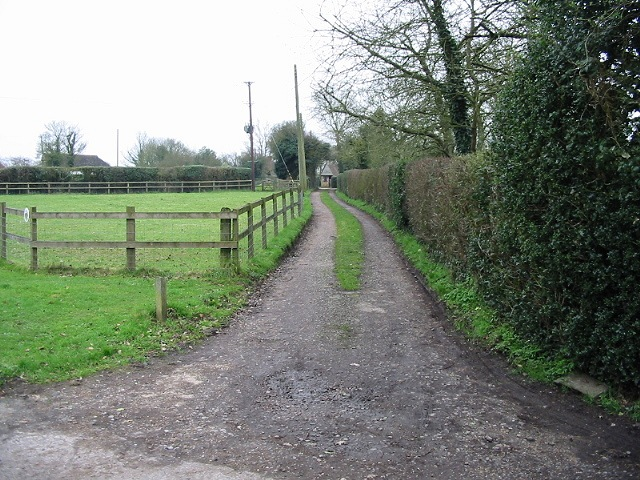
- OS grid reference: TR1049
- Shire county: Kent
- Region: South East
- Country: England
- Sovereign state: United Kingdom
- Police: Kent
- Fire: Kent
- Ambulance: South East Coast

Anvil Green is a hamlet located near Waltham in Kent, England, about nine miles (14 km) north east of Ashford. In the 1841 census it was referred to as Handival Green and acquired its modern name in 1851.
