= Tithe Barn, Sturry =

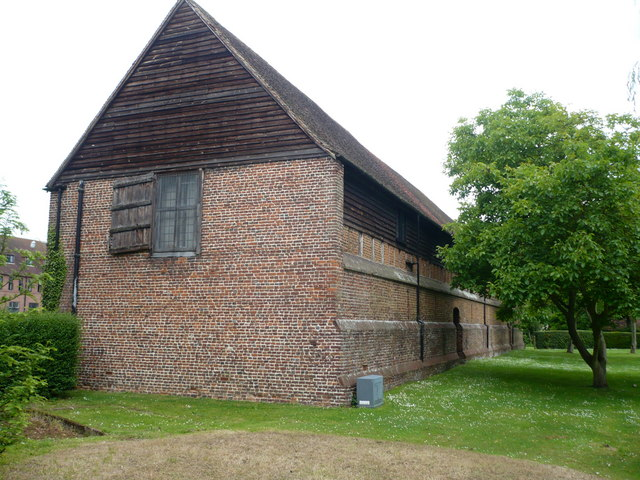
- "Sturry's most memorable building"

- Location within Kent
- 51.2992°N 1.12°E
- Type: tithe barn
- Location: Sturry, Kent, England

History
- Built: 16th century

Site notes
- Architectural style: Vernacular
- Governing body: Privately owned

Listed Building – Grade I
- Official name: The School Hall, Milner Lane
- Designated: 29 September 1952
- Reference no.: 1085499

Listed Building – Grade II
- Official name: Milner Court
- Designated: 29 September 1952
- Reference no.: 1369995

Listed Building – Grade II
- Official name: Gateway to Milner Court
- Designated: 29 September 1952
- Reference no.: 1085498

Listed Building – Grade II
- Official name: Garden Wall to Milner Court
- Designated: 30 January 1967
- Reference no.: 1336611

Listed Building – Grade II
- Official name: Headmaster's House
- Designated: 14 March 1980
- Reference no.: 1336612

The Tithe Barn, Sturry, Kent, England is a barn dating from the early 16th century. The barn was built as the tithe barn for the grange of St Augustine's Abbey, Canterbury. At the Dissolution of the monasteries, the grange came into the ownership of Thomas Smythe who converted some of the buildings into a country house, Sturry Court. The barn continued in use for agricultural storage. In the early 20th century, Sturry Court was the country home of Alfred Milner who renamed it Milner Court. On his death in 1925, his widow, Violet, gifted the estate to The King's School, Canterbury which operated a preparatory school on the site. The school was opened by Rudyard Kipling, a friend of the Milners, in 1929. The site is now the Junior School for The King's School and the tithe barn has been restored and repurposed as a performing arts centre. "Sturry's most memorable building", the tithe barn is a Grade I listed structure.

== History ==
The Abbey of St Augustine was founded in Canterbury in 598. As was common, the abbey established a number of granges on its lands, which operated as agricultural estates generating revenues and produce for the abbey. The resulting produce, and the tithes (taxes) collected by the abbey, were stored in tithe barns. The tithe barn at Sturry is a late manifestation of this economic system, dating from the early 16th century. Within some forty years of its construction, the Dissolution of the monasteries brought an end to the religious houses and the granges which had supported them. That at Sturry was bought by Thomas Smythe who built a country house on the site, which he named Sturry Court.

In the early 20th century, Sturry Court, renamed Milner Court, was the country home of Alfred Milner, 1st Viscount Milner. Milner served as High Commissioner for Southern Africa, was a cabinet minister in several British governments during and after World War I and was a notable proponent of British imperialism. On his death in 1925, his widow, Violet, gave the Sturry estate to The King's School, Canterbury which developed a preparatory school on the site. (Note: Although some sources suggest Lady Milner sold the estate to the school, a letter from George Bell, Dean of Canterbury appears to confirm it was a donation; "I need not tell you again how grateful we are, or how much we appreciate the gift both of itself and for the traditions and hopes which it contains.") It was opened by Rudyard Kipling, a friend of the Milners, in 1929. The site is now the Junior School for The King's School and the tithe barn has been restored and repurposed as a performing arts centre and assembly hall.

== Architecture ==
John Newman, in his 2013 revised edition, Kent: North East and East, in the Pevsner Buildings of England series, calls the tithe barn, "Sturry's most memorable building". The barn is constructed of red brick with its tiled roof supported by ten king posts. It is 160 feet (49 m) in length. The tithe barn is a Grade I listed structure.

== Sources ==
- Newman, John (2013). Kent: North East and East. The Buildings of England. New Haven, US and London: Yale University Press. ISBN 9780300185065. OCLC 869127179.
- Page, William (1926). "The Abbey of St Augustine". The History of Kent. Victoria County History. Vol. 2. London: St Catherine’s Press. OCLC 222576181.
