= Sturry =

Village in Kent, England

Coordinates: 51.3036°N 1.1211°E

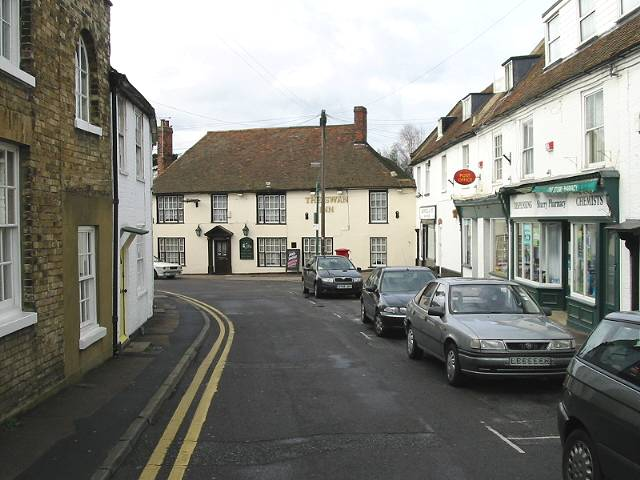
- Sturry High Street

- Location within Kent
- Area: 13.42 km^{2} (5.18 sq mi)
- Population: 6,820 (Civil Parish 2011Y)
  - Density: 508/km^{2} (1,320/sq mi)
- OS grid reference: TR176606
- Civil parish: Sturry
- District: City of Canterbury
- Shire county: Kent
- Region: South East
- Country: England
- Sovereign state: United Kingdom
- Post town: CANTERBURY
- Postcode district: CT2, CT3
- Dialling code: 01227
- Police: Kent
- Fire: Kent
- Ambulance: South East Coast
- UK Parliament: Herne Bay and Sandwich

Sturry is a village on the Great Stour river situated 3 miles (4.8 km) northeast of Canterbury in Kent. Its large civil parish incorporates several hamlets and, until April 2019, the former mining village of Hersden.

== Geography ==
Sturry lies at the old Roman junction of the road from the city to Thanet and Reculver, at the point where a fort was built to protect the crossing of the river Stour. Sturry railway station was opened in 1848 and the line was electrified in 1962, by the South Eastern Railway; it is on the line between Canterbury West and Ramsgate. The station was until the 1860s the stagecoach point for Herne and Herne Bay. The parish boundaries are the same now as they were in 1086 as recorded in the Domesday Book.

== History ==
Human habitation in Sturry is thought to have started around 430,000 years ago, as dated flint implements - namely knives and arrow-tips - show. Other signs of early human activities include a collection of axes and pottery shards from the Bronze Age and more pottery from the Sturry Hill gravel-pits, and a burial-ground near Stonerocks Farm showed that there was an Iron Age settlement of Belgic Celts (who gave Canterbury its pre-Roman name of Durovernum) from the end of the 2nd century BC.

All this evidence indicates that human habitation of some kind existed on the north bank of the River Stour, on Sturry's site, for hundreds and thousands of years. When the Romans arrived, they built Island Road (the A28) to connect Canterbury, the local tribal capital, with the ferry to the Isle of Thanet, with a branch to their fort at Reculver.

The most important era for Sturry, determining its future shape, size, function and name, was that part of the early 5th century when the beleaguered Romano-Britons brought in Frisians and Jutes as mercenaries to help them fight against invading Picts and Scots, and rewarded them with land. Some of them settled near Sturry: their cemetery was found at Hersden. Some time after, Kent was re-organised into lathes, or districts. Sturry was the first; Stour-gau, meaning district or lathe on the Stour. The lathe was bounded by the Stour as far as Canterbury in the North by the sea, and farther south as distant as Wye.

The remains of a large village water mill lie near the parish church, and the High Street retains some historic buildings. The village virtually adjoins one of the smallest towns in England, Fordwich, where there are further interesting buildings, including the historic Town Hall. Fordwich itself is smaller than Sturry. A rare survival, a small granary, constructed with wooden weather-boards is located at Blaxland Farm and has nine staddle stones supporting it. A barn from Vale Farm, Calcott has been re-erected at the Museum of Kent Life, Sandling. A 16th-century manor house and oast house, built in 1583 and which belonged to St Augustine's Abbey in Canterbury still stand in Sturry village beside the medieval tithe barn - although they have all been incorporated into the King's School after they were sold by the widow of Lord Milner in 1925.

Since the 1960s a large number of satellite housing estates have been built on the north side of the village, mostly in former woodland, which have turned Sturry into one of the major dormitory villages for Canterbury. Nonetheless, the village is still overwhelmingly rural, with fields for arable farming and livestock grazing, and large amounts of coppice woodland. A number of market gardens can also be found in the countryside around the village. Large and deep quarries are still worked on the edge of the village, with the old workings flooded to provide recreational lakes used primarily for fishing.

=== The Second World War ===
During the Second World War, Sturry was bombed, the greater part of the High Street being destroyed by a parachute mine in 1941 during the Baedeker Blitz, killing 15 people of which seven were children aged 12 and under. One of these was a little girl who had been to the bakers' and whose body was recovered still clutching the bag of buns she had bought.

The same aircraft dropped another bomb, but this landed amongst the allotments. In the book Letters to Sturry, it is recorded that on Wednesday 28 August 1940, there were eight separate air-raid warnings and on 'Battle of Britain Day', 15 September 1940, a German Dornier bomber plane (Aircraft 2651, 3rd Staffel, Kampfgeschwader 76), crash-landed in a field below Kemberland Wood near the Sarre Penne stream. Three of the five crew were killed and were firstly buried in Sturry Cemetery but then reinterred in the late 1960s into the German war cemetery at Cannock Chase.

Nonetheless, a number of interesting buildings remain intact in Sturry, including the Manor House, built in 1583, which is now the junior school of The King's School, Canterbury.

== Religion ==
St Nicholas parish church is a joint Anglican and Methodist church and is situated on a bank beside the River Stour, The Local Ecumenical Partnership enables the congregation to be of mixed denomination - either Methodist or Anglican. The large parish of St Nicholas incorporates the villages of Sturry with Fordwich and Westbere with Hersden.

The church is predominantly Norman in style, with the oldest parts dating to about 1200. In 1965 the church was Grade I listed by English Heritage.

== Education ==
There are two primary schools in the area. Sturry Church of England Primary school is situated near the north of the village, with strong links with Hersden Primary School. The junior part of The King's School, Canterbury, is also located in south Sturry. Famous alumni of King's School include Antony Worrall Thompson and Orlando Bloom. Spires Academy, formerly known as Sturry Secondary Modern School and later Frank Montgomery School, is the only secondary school in Sturry. It too has produced graduates of note, including the television producer Nic Ayling, the actor Rusty Goffe, and the novelist Michael Paraskos.

== Sport ==
Sturry has had a cricket club playing off Field Way since 1863. In 2005 Sturry Cricket Club was made homeless after the land was sold; currently the club are playing out of Polo Farm Sports Ground near Fordwich and run two sides in the KRCL on Saturday and a friendly side on Sundays.

== See also ==
- Listed buildings in Sturry
