= Chislet =

Village in Kent, England

Coordinates: 51.334°N 1.1913°E

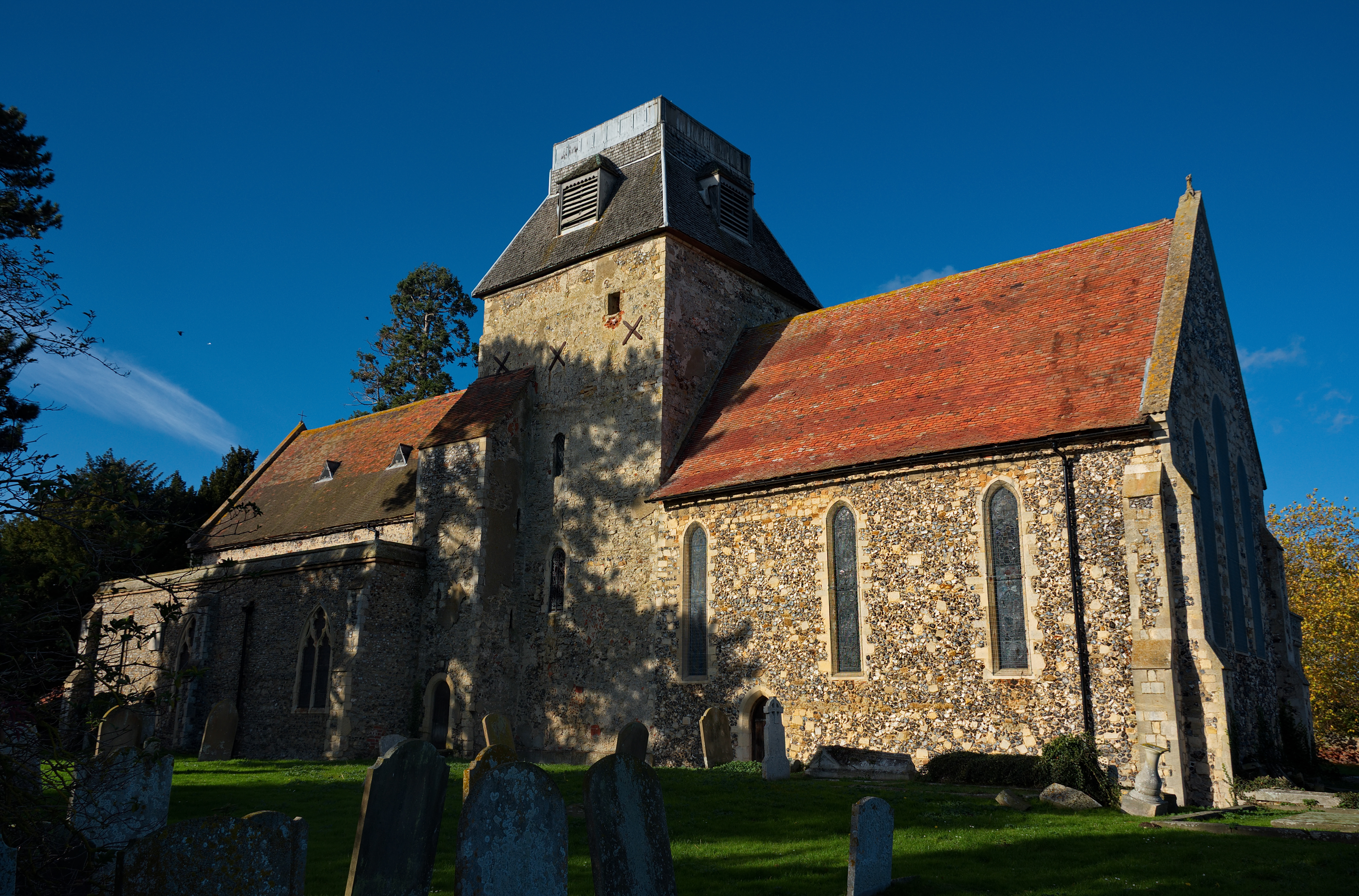
- St Mary the Virgin Church, Chislet

- Location within Kent
- Area: 18.25 km^{2} (7.05 sq mi)
- Population: 872 (Civil Parish 2011)
  - Density: 48/km^{2} (120/sq mi)
- OS grid reference: TR2264
- District: Canterbury
- Shire county: Kent
- Region: South East
- Country: England
- Sovereign state: United Kingdom
- Post town: CANTERBURY
- Postcode district: CT3
- Police: Kent
- Fire: Kent
- Ambulance: South East Coast
- UK Parliament: Herne Bay and Sandwich
- Website: Chislet Parish Council

Chislet is an English village and civil parish in northeast Kent between Canterbury and the Isle of Thanet. The parish is the second largest in the district. A former spelling, 'Chistlet', is seen in 1418. The population of the civil parish includes the hamlet of Marshside. Most of the land use is fertile agricultural and a significant minority of the land is marsh where low-lying.

Chislet has a Primary School, Chislet CofE School, which in 2020 had 102 students aged from 4–11.

== Geography ==
The Chislet marshes mark the western end of the Wantsum Channel, an arm of the North Sea that separated the Isle of Thanet from the mainland. Saltmaking was an important activity in the marshes in ancient times. Chislet Windmill stood north of the Thanet Way on the road to Reculver until it burnt down in 2005; a replica of the exterior minus sails was built on the same site in 2011 during a housing redevelopment. Lavender was also a grown on the land around the current Grove Ferry Public House.

== History ==
The village is served by the Anglican parish church of St Mary the Virgin, a Grade I listed building.

Chislet church is of mainly Norman architecture, but with a general pre-normal Saxon layout. Roman funerary artifacts have been found within the graveyard – suggesting a long term usage of the site. Built mainly of rough flint capped with Caen, Bath and Kentish Rag stone, it was renovated in the 13th century, when the north and south aisles were added, and in 1866.

The original Manor of Chislet was granted by Charter by King Ethelbert to Saint Augustine on 7 January 605. The Manor remained for the benefit of St Augustine's Abbey, also founded in 605, until the reformation. At that point it reverted to the King and then the Archbishop of Canterbury, from where the modern parish was formed.

The church registers indicate that in 1607 Chislet collected £1,6s,8½ pence for the building of Saint Paul's Cathedral, London.

The Anglo-Westphalian Coal Syndicates Ltd was set up in 1911 to lease land near Chislet, and after various setbacks they finally moved approximately two miles south to take advantage of the A28 road on one side and the railway line on the other. Sinking started in 1914, with control taken over from the German company; a new company was set up called The Chislet Colliery Ltd. Coal was finally reached in 1918 at 1350 ft (411 metres). Chislet Colliery Housing Society was formed in 1924 to build a small colliery village of 300 houses north of the colliery on the main road to Thanet. Originally called Chislet Colliery Village, the name was changed to Hersden in 1929 to avoid confusion with Chislet village some 2 miles away. Until its closure in July 1969, Chislet was the most northerly colliery in Kent.

== Localities ==
Chislet parish includes several villages and localities:

- Boyden Gate
- Chislet
- Chislet Forstal
- Grays
- Highstead
- Marshside
- Upstreet

== See also ==
- Listed buildings in Chislet
