= Hersden =

Village in Kent, England

Coordinates: 51.315°N 1.162°E

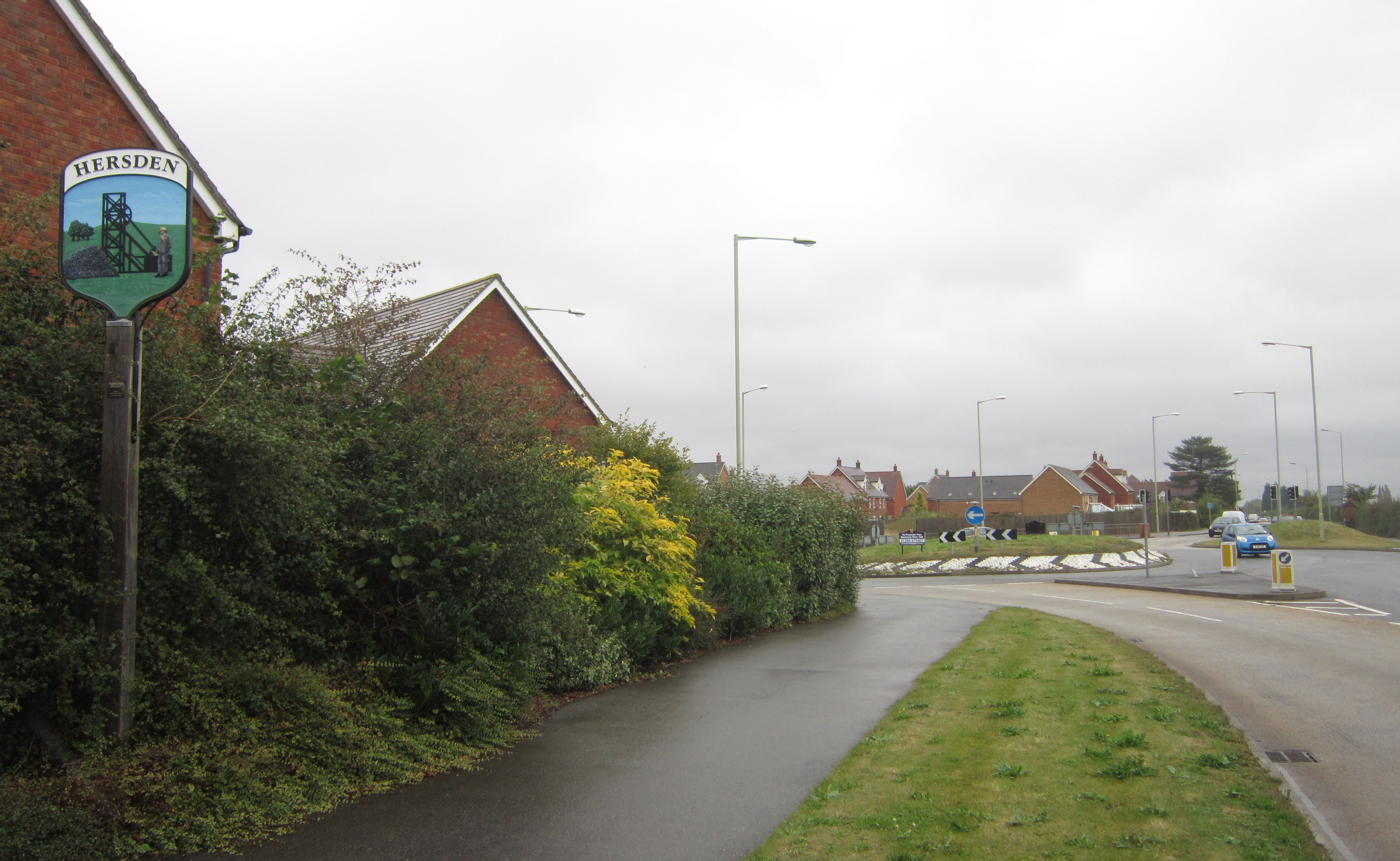
- Village entrance

- Location within Kent
- Population: 1,503 (2011)
- OS grid reference: TR204620
- Civil parish: Hersden
- District: City of Canterbury
- Shire county: Kent
- Region: South East
- Country: England
- Sovereign state: United Kingdom
- Post town: Canterbury
- Postcode district: CT3
- Dialling code: 01227
- Police: Kent
- Fire: Kent
- Ambulance: South East Coast
- UK Parliament: Herne Bay and Sandwich

Hersden is a village east of Canterbury in Kent, South East England. It was established as a planned coalmining village in the 1920s and is on the A28 road between Canterbury and the Isle of Thanet. Work in the Kent Coalfield was the main source of employment in the village until the closure of the Kent colliery in the 1980s.

The parish was formed on 1 April 2019 from parts of Sturry, Chislet and Westbere. The Ashford to Ramsgate railway line runs through the parish to the south of the village. This formerly served the colliery and a station, Chislet Colliery Halt railway station, operated between 1919 and 1971.

== History ==
A 5th–6th century cemetery of Frisians and Jutes was discovered nearby in 1931.

Exploratory works for a Channel Tunnel at Shakespeare Cliff near Dover led to the identification of the Kent Coalfield in 1890. Its northern extension came after coal was discovered at Chislet in 1918. Initially the miners lived in Ramsgate but in 1924 the Chislet Colliery Housing Society was formed to build a mining village of 300 houses. In 1929 the village was renamed from Chislet Colliery Mining Village to Hersden. The mine closed in 1969 but the Chislet Colliery Welfare Club remains.

== Amenities ==
Village facilities include a village hall, which houses a social club, the former Anglican and Methodist church, which is now a community centre, and St Dunstan Roman Catholic church which opened in 1935. The village has a primary school and a doctors surgery. Sports facilities include a bowls club and a BMX track. Canterbury Industrial Park is located to the west of the village on the site of spoil heap associated with the colliery. With the “Hoplands” estate, there will be a new primary school, a Co-Op, a Harvester, a pharmacy, a community square, a Canterbury College Centre, a dentist, and some business parks.

== See also ==
- Listed buildings in Hersden
