= Westbere =

Village in Kent, England

Coordinates: 51.306°N 1.143°E

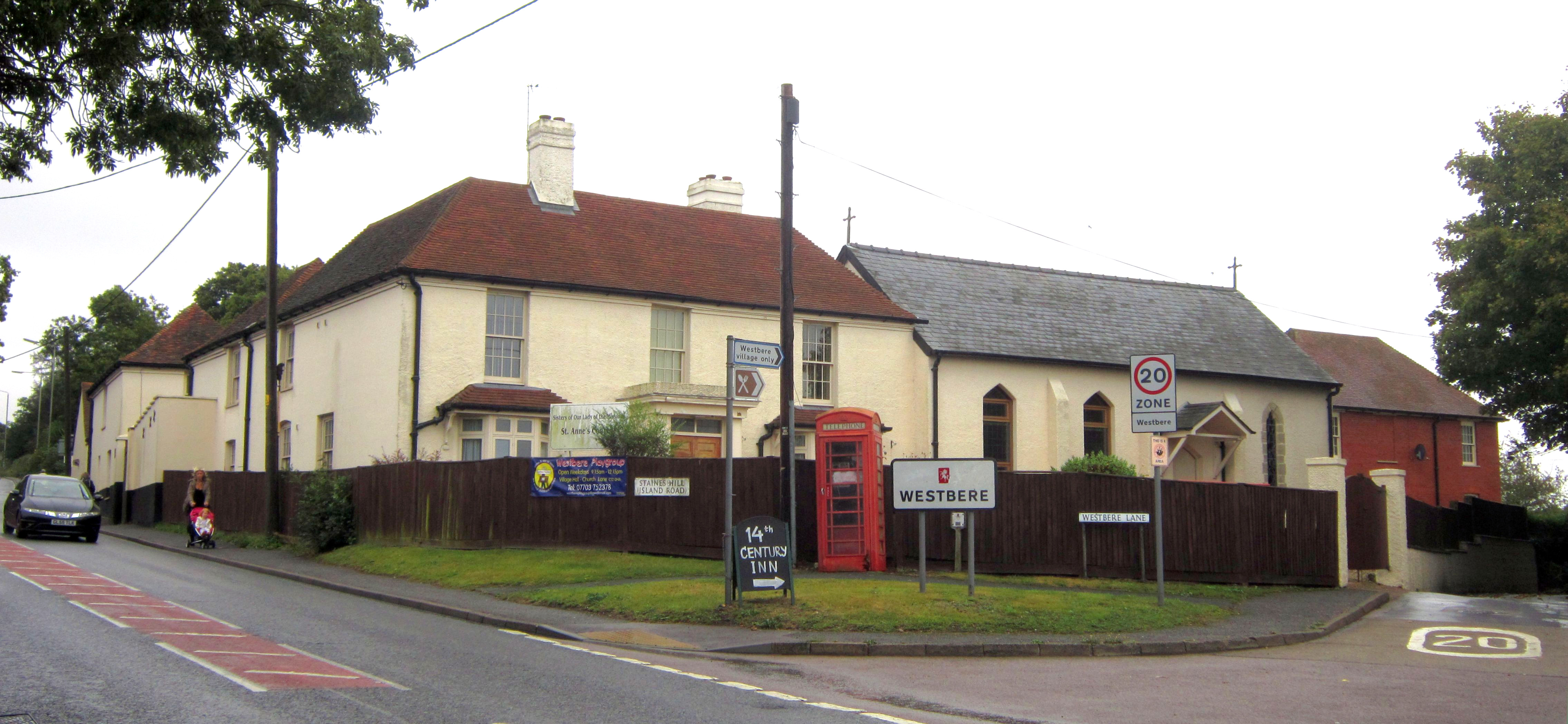
- Village entrance

- Location within Kent
- Area: 3.52 km^{2} (1.36 sq mi)
- Population: 376 (Civil Parish 2011)
  - Density: 107/km^{2} (280/sq mi)
- OS grid reference: TR190613
- Civil parish: Westbere
- District: City of Canterbury
- Shire county: Kent
- Region: South East
- Country: England
- Sovereign state: United Kingdom
- Post town: Canterbury
- Postcode district: CT2
- Dialling code: 01227
- Police: Kent
- Fire: Kent
- Ambulance: South East Coast
- UK Parliament: Herne Bay and Sandwich

Westbere is a small village and civil parish in Kent, England, centred 4 miles (6.4 km) north-east of Canterbury city centre along the A28 road to the Isle of Thanet.

== Geography ==
This is a relatively small Parish. Most of the land use in this district is agricultural then residential as a subsidiary. It comprises a preservation area that overlooks Westbere lakes (created by gravel extraction) that teem with birds and wildlife. The village spreads along a steep wooded bank north of the Great Stour between the A28 and the Ashford to Ramsgate railway. With fewer than 130 properties, it is a peaceful rural village with a variety of dwellings including a minority of hall houses built in the 15th century; some historic cottages and barns; a few Georgian and similar period properties surviving for wealthy residents and some modern houses and bungalows. Because it was for so long a poor farming community, it was not targeted for development in Victorian times and the central part of Westbere, in particular, remains quaint and rural. Westbere lakes, created when a former quarry was flooded, now form an extensive wetland area with reed beds.

== History ==
Westbere has been on important transport routes, and the subject of development, for at least two millennia. Given its historical position on these routes it is not surprising that Westbere has had significant archaeological discoveries recorded over the last couple of centuries, including prehistoric artefacts, Romano-British and Anglo-Saxon burials and a large Iron Age Romano-British settlement (now beneath Lakesview International Business Park). Almost all were discovered accidentally; it did not prove possible to assess their full significance properly and they have been sparse in number given the long known history of settlement. All relate to a relatively narrow time period, roughly 700 BC to 700 AD, after which there is a gap until the church appears sometime after the Norman conquest. Much probably remains to be discovered and a full archaeological assessment and history are still waiting to be written.

== Economy ==
There has been industrial development in some of the areas beyond the village including the now closed Chislet Colliery and the new Lakesview International Business Park.

== Culture ==
Venues exist in the village and social events are well-supported, mainly:

- Westbere annual Summer Picnic
- Westbere community Christmas lunch
- Westbere Christmas carols on the Green.

One of the organisations, the Westbere Village Preservation Society, has set up a Westbere Heritage Trail with a grant from the Local Heritage Initiative. An illustrated and descriptive walking trail leaflet is accompanied by a booklet which contains contributions from many villagers. Subjects documented include the architecture, industry, the lakes, local traditions and treasures, natural and social history, All Saints Church and Ye Olde Yew Tree Inn. The Village Hall houses an album quilt with the theme "Living in Westbere" made entirely by the residents of Westbere parish.

== Amenities ==
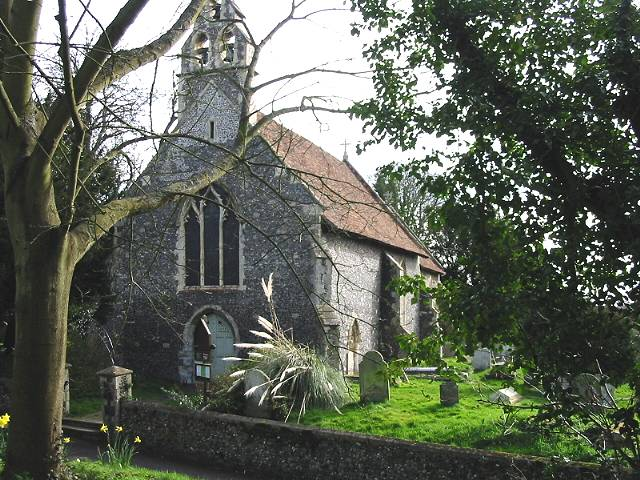
All Saints' Church, Westbere

The village has no formal centre with shops and other services; All Saints Church presides from the hill slope in Church Lane; there is a much used village hall and the local inn, Ye Olde Yew Tree, dating from the 14th century, is popular with locals and visitors. The Inn was built in 1348 and it is the oldest pub in Kent. Queen Anne and the Archbishop of Canterbury are reputed to have stayed here, and Dick Turpin evaded capture from the law hiding out here. The building was used as a hospital to treat wounded soldiers during the civil war and supposedly it has two ghosts. The interior is heavily beamed and features a large inglenook fireplace.

== See also ==
- Listed buildings in Westbere
