= Adisham Water Tower =

Water tower in Adisham, Kent, UK

Coordinates: 51°14′14″N 1°09′49″E

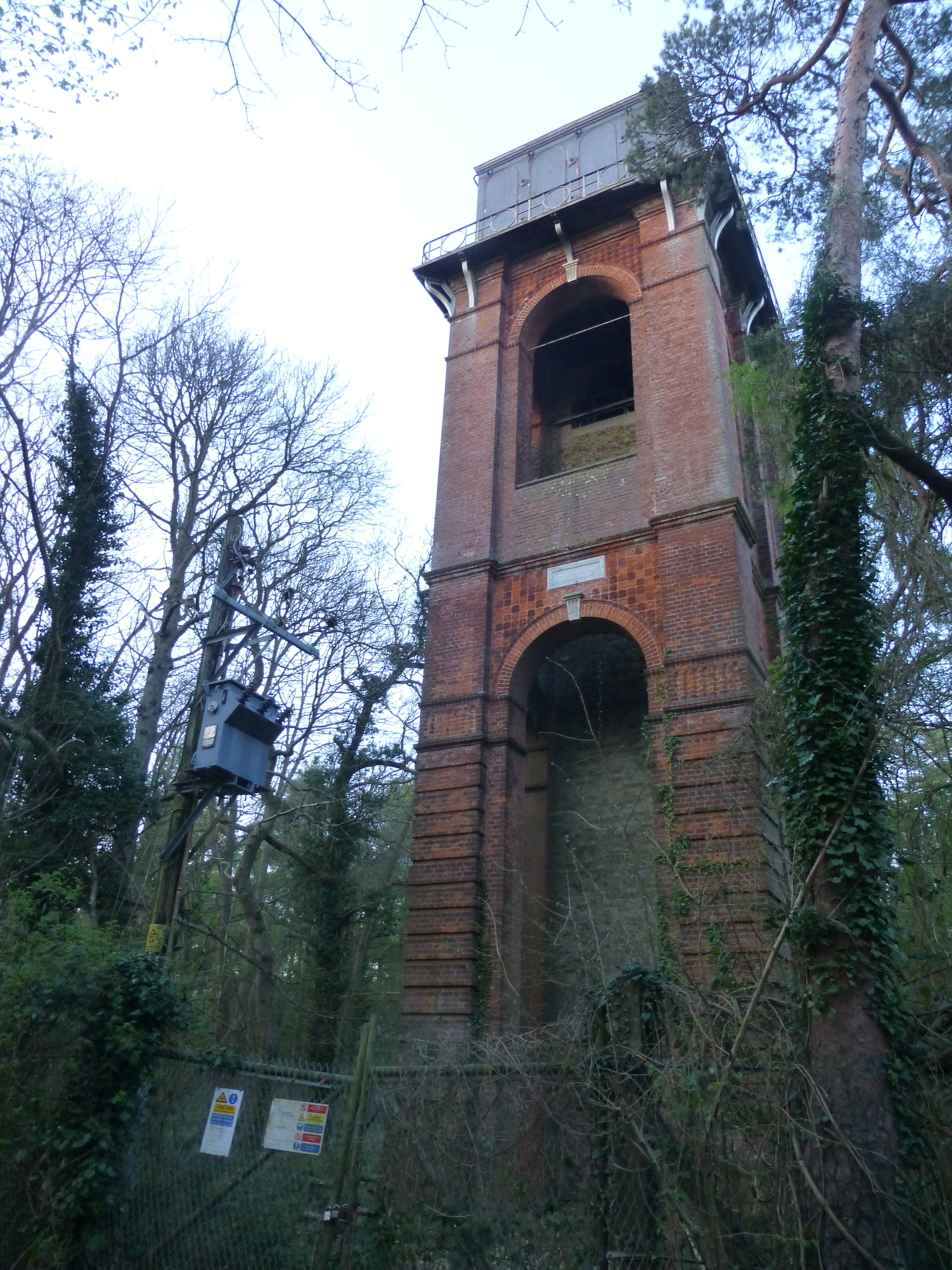
Adisham Water Tower, viewed from Woodlands Road

Adisham Water Tower is a Grade II listed building located in the parish of Adisham, Kent. The structure was built in 1903 in an Edwardian Italianate Revival style for the Margate Corporation District Waterworks. It is a rectangular tower built in red brick and terracotta with a water tank made of iron. A range of architectural features are described in its site listing and include “pilasters with banded rustication, open arcading with round arches with stone keystones and terracotta decoration above with stone panel bearing date and name of waterworks. One arch to shorter sides, three to longer. Moulded stringcourse between stages. Upper stage is similar but without the rustication and has deep eaves cornice on brackets supporting walkway (with decorative iron railings) around panelled iron tank." The iron water tank is inscribed “Erected by Newton Chambers and Co, Thorncliffe Ironworks Sheffield 1903."

== Literary heritage ==
The Water Tower is featured by writer and naturalist Jocelyn Brooke (1908–1966) as a recurring figure in his series of semi-autobiographical novels known as The Orchid Trilogy. It is one of several landmarks that form part of Brooke's mythical portrayal of his relationship with the landscapes of East Kent, which extends from childhood experiences in the early twentieth century to later life after World War II.

In The Orchid Trilogy's second book, A Mine of Serpents (first published in 1949), Brooke recounts childhood walks to the Water Tower from the nearby village of Bishopsbourne, "up a chalky lane which wound away over Barham Downs." The Water Tower would disappear from view and reappear several times during the journey; a characteristic of the landmark that Brooke signals throughout the novel:

"It had, in fact, an extraordinary capacity for thus suddenly disappearing and reappearing; from miles away, on the other side of the valley, it could be seen, at one moment, shining out clearly above the woodland; and a few seconds later, it would have entirely vanished, masked suddenly by an intervening tree, or by some higher reach of Barham Downs."

— Jocelyn Brooke, The Orchid Trilogy, page 159–160 (King Penguin edition, 1981)

In the same book, Brooke describes the Water Tower's early appearance in detail:

"It was an extraordinary structure: not ‘functional’ at all, as one might have expected, but built with the solidity, the pretentious respectability, of a stockbroker’s villa in Surrey. (Even the group of pine-trees which surrounded it gave an added touch of sub-urbanity; the rest of the wood was mainly oak and hazel.) Four columns of brick-work, converging at their summits, formed four corresponding arches: the tower had the look of an arcade or a viaduct folded in upon itself to form a quadrilateral. The brick-work was solid and expensive-looking, and one expected to see at its base, instead of the jungle of nettles and willow-herb, neat beds of lobelias and calceolarias. But above the four conjoined arches, the suburban impression ended abruptly; for, instead of a red roof and gables, the tower bore upon its summit the vast, rectangular tank, painted white, and bearing the inscription:

MARGATE CORPORATION DISTRICT WATERWORKS

1903"

— Jocelyn Brooke, The Orchid Trilogy, page 160–161 (King Penguin edition, 1981)

Throughout A Mine of Serpents, Brooke recalls a series of memories and impressions of the Water Tower from different stages of his life and varying vantage points, which take on metaphorical significance.

As a child, Brooke's affection for the structure was "tempered by a certain awe, a sense of some unknown potency residing within that august form," which he compares to his feelings for his father. Brooke also remembers the sight of 'miners' who "clambered up the zig-zag iron ladder" and "clung like monkeys to the railing round the tank; some had mounted to the gallery itself."

In adulthood, Brooke describes seeing the Water Tower above distant woods from Three Barrows Down near Woolage Village: "Remote, mysterious, it flashed its sudden signal across the sunburned fields: but the message was one which I had never been, perhaps never should be, able to decode...".

After World War II, when the tower's tank had been painted black, Brooke recalls the view from Barham Downs: "the paint was beginning to wear off, and hadn't been renewed: the tank showed dimly above the wood, a smudge of whitish grey – a burnt-out firework...".

In the final passage of A Mine of Serpents, the reader is left with a view of The Watertower from Bekesbourne train station:

"I looked across at the line of woods on the horizon, and gave a sudden start of surprised recognition: there, protruding naked from the dark mass of trees, gleaming with a tarnished whiteness against the grey sky, was the watertower. I had scarcely ever seen it, before, from this aspect: I was on the 'wrong' side of it, beyond the frontier-line of the woods. Over there, on the other side, was familiar country; mute, non-committal, the tower stood between two worlds, guarding the frontier: its white cap poised, like a silent, hovering bird, between the future and the past."

— Jocelyn Brooke, The Orchid Trilogy, page 303 (King Penguin edition, 1981)

== Surrounding landscape ==
Adisham Water Tower is situated next to Woodlands Road, part of Route 16 of the Sustrans National Cycle Network. The structure itself and the section of Woodlands Road it stands on are part of the Woodlands Park (Adisham) Conservation Area (designated 28 March 1995). Adjacent to the Water Tower are two ancient woodlands, Oxenden Shaw and Woodlands Wood, with the latter forming part of the Kent Downs Area of Outstanding Natural Beauty.

== Management ==
There has been controversy in recent years over the management and appearance of the Water Tower and its surrounding woodland. Local residents in Adisham have voiced concerns about the subdivision and sale of the adjacent land at Oxenden Shaw and Woodlands Wood by woodlands.co.uk. An action group, Watch Over Adisham's Woods, has drawn attention to the subsequent installation of tall electrified fencing, security lights, new woodland buildings, roadways, postboxes and CCTV cameras which, in their view, have a negative impact on the cultural heritage of the Water Tower and the character of its surrounding landscape. These issues remain unresolved.
