= BKS =

BKS may refer to:

- BKS theory, on interaction of matter and electromagnetic radiation
- BKS Air Transport, UK airline 1951-1970
- BKS (band), a Canadian techno group created by radio DJ Chris Sheppard, with Hennie Bekker and Greg Kavanagh
- BKS, Fatmawati Soekarno Airport IATA code
- B. K. S. Iyengar, an Indian yoga expert
- Bekesbourne railway station, Kent, England, National Rail station code BKS
- Bharatiya Kisan Sangh, Indian organisation of farmers
- British Kinematograph Society, previous name of the International Moving Image Society (IMIS), British non-profit organisation for the moving image industries
- Station code for Bekasi railway station

== See also ==
- BKS Stal Bielsko-Biała, Polish sports club
