= A Canterbury Tale =

1944 British film by Michael Powell and Emeric Pressburger

- US theatrical poster (1949)
- Directed by: Michael Powell; Emeric Pressburger
- Written by: Michael Powell; Emeric Pressburger
- Produced by: Michael Powell; Emeric Pressburger
- Starring: Eric Portman; Sheila Sim; Dennis Price; Sgt John Sweet
- Cinematography: Erwin Hillier
- Edited by: John Seabourne Sr.
- Music by: Allan Gray
- Production company: The Archers
- Distributed by: General Film Distributors
- Release date: 21 August 1944
- Running time: 124 minutes
- Country: United Kingdom
- Language: English

A Canterbury Tale is a 1944 British film by Michael Powell and Emeric Pressburger starring Eric Portman, Sheila Sim, Dennis Price and Sgt. John Sweet; Esmond Knight provided narration and played two small roles. For the post-war American release, Raymond Massey narrated and Kim Hunter was added to the film. The film was made in black and white, and was the first of two collaborations between Powell and Pressburger and cinematographer Erwin Hillier.

Much of the film's visual style is a mixture of British realism and Hillier's German Expressionist style that is harnessed through a neo-romantic sense of the English landscape. The concept that 'the past always haunts the present' in the English landscape was already part of English literary culture, e.g. in works by Rudyard Kipling such as Puck of Pook's Hill, and would become a notable trope for British novelists and film-makers from the 1960s. A Canterbury Tale takes its title from the 14th-century The Canterbury Tales of Geoffrey Chaucer and loosely uses Chaucer's theme of "eccentric characters on a religious pilgrimage" to highlight the wartime experiences of the citizens of Kent and encourage wartime Anglo-American friendship and understanding. Anglo-American relations were also explored in Powell and Pressburger's previous film The Life and Death of Colonel Blimp and in more detail in their subsequent film A Matter of Life and Death.

== Plot ==
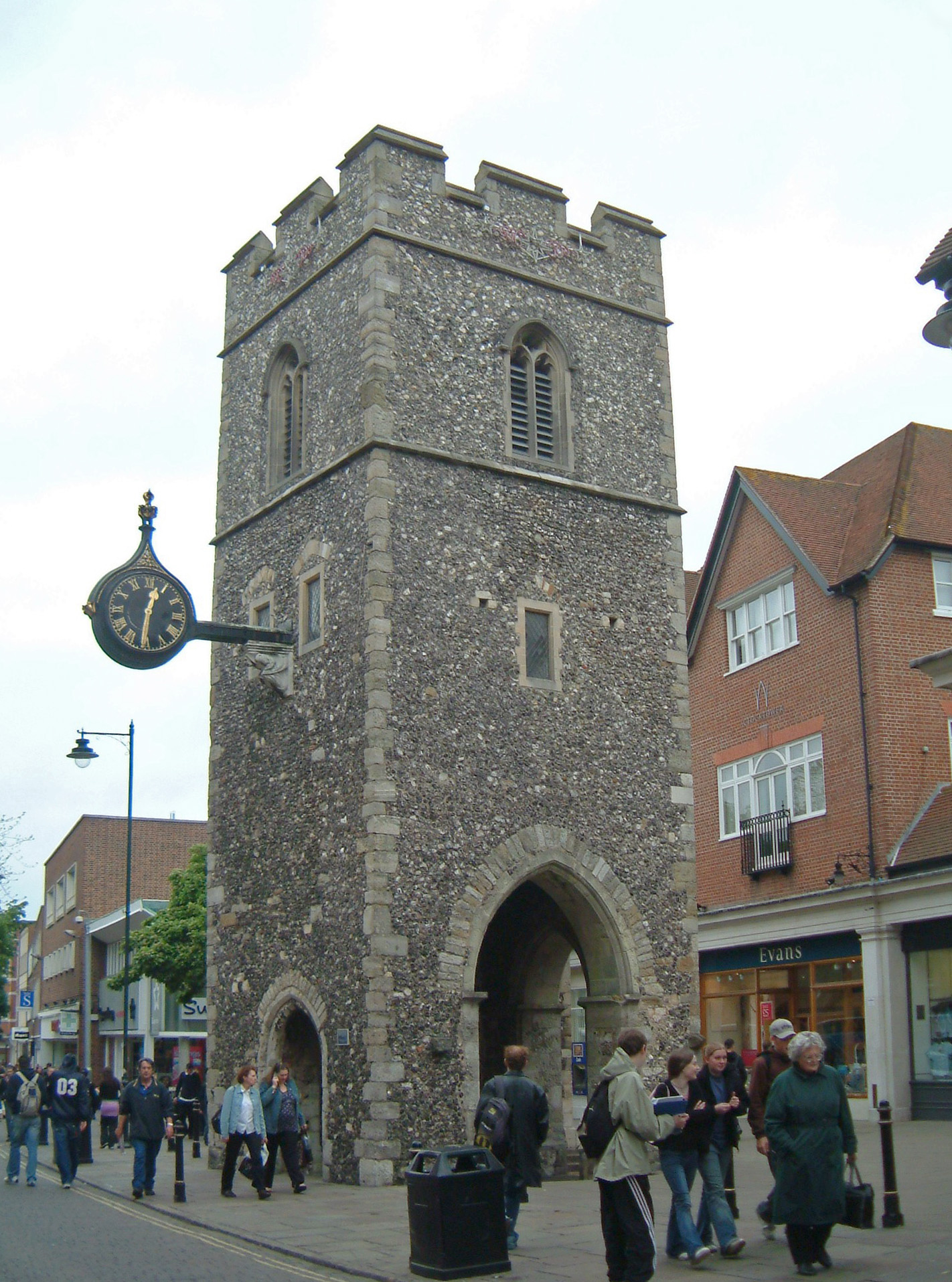
St George's Church tower, seen in the film after being gutted in the Baedeker raids (modern photograph)

The story concerns three young people: British Army Sergeant Peter Gibbs, U.S. Army Sergeant Bob Johnson, and a "Land Girl", Miss Alison Smith. The group arrive at the railway station in the fictitious small Kent town of Chillingbourne (filmed in Chilham, Fordwich, Wickhambreaux and other villages in the area), near Canterbury, late on Friday night, 27 August 1943. Peter has been stationed at a nearby Army camp, Alison is due to start working on a farm in the area, and Bob left the train by mistake, hearing the announcement "next stop Canterbury" and thinking he was in Canterbury.

As they leave the station together Alison is attacked by an assailant in uniform, who pours glue on her hair before escaping. It transpires that this has happened to other women, and the mystery attacker is known locally as "the glue man". Alison asks Bob if he will spend the weekend in Chillingbourne to help her solve the mystery. The next day, while riding a farm cart in the countryside, Alison meets Peter, who surrounds her cart with his platoon of three Bren Gun Carriers. Alison agrees to meet Peter again. The three decide to investigate the attack, enlisting the help of the locals, including several small boys who play large-scale war games.

The three use their detective skills to identify the culprit as a local magistrate, Thomas Colpeper, a gentleman farmer and pillar of the community, who also gives local history lectures to soldiers stationed in the district. Alison interviews all the glue man's victims to identify the dates and times of their attacks. Gibbs visits Colpeper at his home and steals the fire watch roster listing the nights Colpeper was on duty in the town hall, whilst a paper drive for salvage by Johnson's boy commandos lets Johnson discover receipts for gum used to make glue sold to Colpeper. The dates of the attacks correspond with Colpeper's night watches, for which he wore a Home Guard uniform kept in the town hall.

On their train journey to Canterbury on the Monday morning, Colpeper joins the three in their compartment. They confront him with their suspicions, which he does not deny, and they discover that his motive is to prevent the soldiers from being distracted from his lectures by female company, as well as to help keep the local women faithful to their absent British boyfriends. In Colpeper's words, Chaucer's pilgrims travelled to Canterbury to "receive a blessing or to do penance". On arriving in the city of Canterbury, devastated by wartime bombing, all three young people receive blessings of their own. Alison discovers that her boyfriend, believed killed in the war, has survived after all; his father, who had blocked their marriage because he thought his son could do better than a shopgirl, finally relents. Bob receives long-delayed letters from his sweetheart, who is now a WAC in Australia. Peter, a cinema organist before the war, gets to play the music of Johann Sebastian Bach on the large organ at Canterbury Cathedral, before leaving with his unit. He decides not to report Colpeper to the Canterbury police, as he had planned to do.

== Cast ==
Gibbs, Johnson and Smith The Seven Sisters Soldier is standing behind Peter and Bob, and Sgt. 'Stuffy' (Graham Moffatt) is asleep

- Eric Portman as Thomas Colpeper, a gentleman farmer and magistrate in Chillingbourne. He is a bachelor, living with his mother and, being very keen on the local history of the area, wants to share that knowledge with everyone around him, particularly with the soldiers from elsewhere in Britain who have been billeted nearby.
- Sgt. John Sweet, U.S. Army as Acting Sgt. Bob Johnson, ASN 31036062, hails from Three Sisters Falls, Oregon. On his way from Salisbury to Canterbury to meet his friend and fulfil a promise to his mother to see Canterbury Cathedral, he gets off the train at Chillingbourne (filmed at Selling railway station between Faversham and Canterbury) by mistake and almost immediately gets caught up in the mystery of the "glue man". He has come to Britain as a part of the American Army preparing for the invasion of Europe. He becomes more and more willing to learn something about England during his visit. The original script mentioned that Johnson was on his way to Canterbury as his ancestors had come from there. The producers had originally planned to use Burgess Meredith in the role but changed their mind in favour of an unknown. Meredith acted as a script editor for Johnson's character.
- Dennis Price as Sgt Peter Gibbs, a cinema organist from London. He has been conscripted into the British Army and has just been stationed at the military camp outside Chillingbourne, where his unit is engaged in training manoeuvres.
- Sheila Sim as Alison Smith, a shop assistant in a department store in London. She has joined the Women's Land Army to "do her bit" to help in the defence of her country. She has been assigned to the farm of Thomas Colpeper, the local JP in Chillingbourne. Alison had previously spent a happy summer just outside Chillingbourne, living in a caravan with her fiancé, an archaeologist who has since joined the RAF and is missing in action at the outset of the film. (He is reported at the end as alive and in Gibraltar.) Alison is determined to solve the mystery of the "glue man" and seeks the help of Bob Johnson to do so. Johnson replies, admiringly: "You need about as much help as a Flying Fortress".
- Charles Hawtrey as Thomas Duckett, the town's stationmaster.
- Esmond Knight as Narrator/Seven-Sisters Soldier/Village Idiot. The Narrator reads the modernised extract from Chaucer's Canterbury Tales, followed by a piece in Chaucerian style on the changes to Kent since Chaucer's time (both only in the original version).
- George Merritt as Ned Horton and Edward Rigby as Jim Horton, play the blacksmith and the wheelwright. The real Horton brothers, Ben and Neville, are seen acting as assistants to the actors.
- Hay Petrie as Woodcock.
- Freda Jackson as Mrs Prudence Honeywood, the farming woman who employs Alison.
- Eliot Makeham as the cathedral organist in Canterbury.
- Betty Jardine as Fee Baker.
- Harvey Golden as Sgt Roczinsky, Bob Johnson's friend in Canterbury.
- Leonard Smith (Leslie) James Tamsitt (Terry) and David Todd (David), play among the group of boys enjoying an adventure and river battle in a bucolic setting. All of them were local to the Canterbury area. Smith, Tamsitt and Todd were selected for speaking roles.
- Beresford Egan as PC Ovenden.
- Anthony Holles as Sergt. Bassett.
- Maude Lambert as Miss Grainger.
- Wally Bosco as ARP man.
- Charles Paton as Ernie Brooks.
- Jane Millican as Susanna Foster.
- John Slater as Sergt. Len.
- Michael Golden as Sergt. Smale.
- Graham Moffatt as Sergt. 'Stuffy'.
- Mary Line as Leslie's mother.
- Winifred Swaffer as Mrs Horton.
- Michael Howard as Archie.
- Judith Furse as Dorothy Bird.
- Barbara Waring as Polly Finn.
- Jean Shepeard as Gwladys Swinton.
- Margaret Scudamore as Mrs Colpeper.
- Joss Ambler as Police Inspector.
- Jessie James as Waitress.
- Kathleen Lucas as a passer- by.
- H. F. Maltby as Mr Portal.
- Eric Maturin as Geoffrey's father.
- Parry Jones Jr. as Arthur.
- Esma Cannon as Agnes the maid.
- Kim Hunter as Johnson's Girl (American release).
- Raymond Massey as Narrator (American version) (voice).

== Production ==
=== Writing ===
Powell and Pressburger, who were known collectively as "The Archers", wrote the script together, linking the concepts of landscape and history (light and time) with the personal journey of three people—the pilgrims—to show a basis of common identity. Powell was said to have used the work of Chaucer as inspiration to create a film that showed "the love of his birthplace and all that he felt about England".

=== Casting ===
All three leads were unknowns. Many local people, including a lot of young boys, were recruited as extras for the extensive scenes of children's outdoor activities such as river "battles" and dens.

=== Filming ===
The film was shot throughout the county of Kent not long after the Baedeker raids of May–June 1942 which had destroyed large areas of the city centre of Canterbury. Much of the film is shot on location in and around Canterbury Cathedral and the city's bomb sites, including the High Street, Rose Lane and the Buttermarket. The cathedral was not available for filming as the stained glass had been taken down, the windows boarded up and the organ, an important location for the story, removed to storage, all for protection against air raids. By the use of clever perspective, large portions of the cathedral were recreated within the studio by art director Alfred Junge.

Several Kent villages including Chilham, Wickhambreaux, Fordwich and Wingham were used for scenes showing the fictional village of Chillingbourne. Selling Station appears in the film as Chillingbourne Station at the beginning of the film. Chilham Mill features in the film in the scene where GI Bob meets children playing in the river on a boat and later, with Peter, when they get the proof about Colpeper. The scene where soldiers gather for a lecture at the Colpepper Institute was filmed in Fordwich. As Bob and Alison ride on a cart through the village, Wickham Mill, Wickhambreaux, can be clearly seen. Colpeper's house was Wickhambreaux Court. A local Wingham village pub "The Red Lion" was used for some exterior shots of "The Hand of Glory" inn where Bob stays whilst in the village. Other exterior shots of "The Hand of Glory" were filmed at "The George and Dragon", Fordwich.

Before the credits, the following acknowledgement appears over an image of the cathedral viewed from the Christ Church Gate,

The Archers gratefully acknowledge the invaluable help and advice given to them by the Dean and Chapter of Canterbury, the Very Reverend the Dean of St Albans, the Mayor and Corporation of Canterbury, the Women's Land Army, and by the United States Army. They also thank the citizens of Canterbury and men and women of Kent who helped to make the film.

== Soundtrack ==
Besides that composed by Allan Gray for the film, musical works featured include:

- "Angelus ad Virginem" mid-15th century polyphony heard as a peal of bells in orchestral guise under the opening titles
- "Commando Patrol" by Allan Gray, Stan Bowsher, Walter Ridley – quickstep heard in the background during Johnson and Gibbs's scene in the lobby of the Hand of Glory
- "I See You Everywhere" by Allan Gray, Stan Bowsher, Walter Ridley – slow foxtrot heard in the background during Johnson and Gibbs's scene in the lobby of the Hand of Glory
- "Turkey in the Straw" – folksong heard as Agnes leaves Bob's bedroom
- "Come to the Church in the Wild Wood" – Bob sings as he washes
- "Hear my prayer, O Lord" by Henry Purcell – the ethereal choral music heard as Gibbs pauses on entering the cathedral
- "Bond of Friendship" – Regimental March of the King's Division. Played as the band nears the Cathedral
- Toccata and Fugue in D minor, BWV 565 by J. S. Bach (the original while inside the cathedral and the orchestration by Leopold Stokowski outside the cathedral) and the hymn "Onward Christian Soldiers" – played on the organ by Gibbs

== Reception ==
The world premiere was held on 11 May 1944 at the Friars' Cinema (later the second site of the Marlowe Theatre, now demolished), Canterbury, England, an event commemorated there by a plaque unveiled by stars Sheila Sim and John Sweet in October 2000. Although the film initially had very poor reviews in the UK press, and only small audiences, it became a moderate success at the British box office in 1944.

According to Kinematograph Weekly the film did well at the British box office in August 1944.

The film was the first production of Powell and Pressburger not to be a major box office draw. With the war over Powell was forced by the studio to completely re-edit the film for the U.S. release, cutting over 20 minutes to make the film shorter and faster moving, adding narration by Raymond Massey, and filming "bookends" which introduced Kim Hunter as Sergeant Johnson's girlfriend to make the film more contemporary. At the time of filming, Hunter and Massey were preparing to film A Matter of Life and Death for Powell. Powell filmed Hunter's sequences with Sweet on an English set simulating New York City where the couple, now married, presented the film as a flashback similar to the openings of The Way to the Stars and 12 O'Clock High. Sweet was actually filmed in New York with the sequences combined. The film was fully restored by the British Film Institute in the late 1970s and the new print was hailed as a masterwork of British cinema. It has since been reissued on DVD in both the UK and USA.

On the review aggregator website Rotten Tomatoes, 93% of 14 critics' reviews are positive, with an average rating of 7.6/10.

Rated 259th on Sight and Sound's Greatest Films of All Time 2022 list.

== Legacy ==
There is now an annual festival based around the film in which film fans tour the film's locations. The theme of the film was used by Spike Milligan for The Goon Show episode "The Phantom Head Shaver of Brighton" in 1954. The film was shown in the nave of Canterbury Cathedral on 19 September 2007 to help raise money for the cathedral restoration fund and in the Chilham village hall in May 2014 to help raise money for the restoration of its war memorial. The screening, which took place in the village where the film was made, coincided with the 70th anniversary of the film's premiere in Canterbury. Several video artists have recut the more visionary sections of the film as video art. Dialogue from the film was sampled on the track "Introduction" on the album Merrie Land by The Good, the Bad & the Queen, and Dreadzone's Second Light.
