= Bekesbourne =

Village in Kent, England

Coordinates: 51.2576°N 1.1443°E

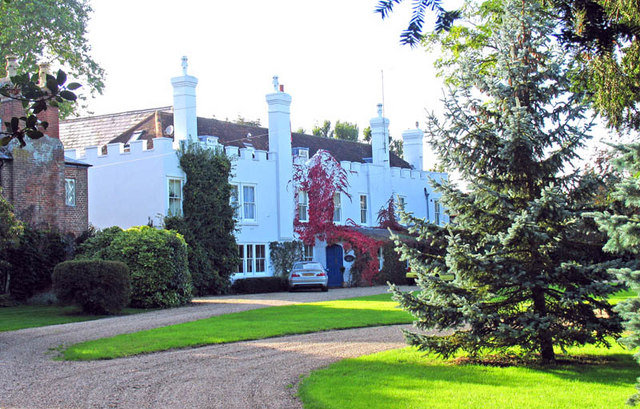
- The Old Palace

- Location within Kent
- Area: 8.47 km^{2} (3.27 sq mi)
- Population: 925 (Civil Parish 2011)
  - Density: 109/km^{2} (280/sq mi)
- OS grid reference: TR191559
- Civil parish: Bekesbourne-with-Patrixbourne
- District: Canterbury
- Shire county: Kent
- Region: South East
- Country: England
- Sovereign state: United Kingdom
- Post town: CANTERBURY
- Postcode district: CT4
- Dialling code: 01227
- Police: Kent
- Fire: Kent
- Ambulance: South East Coast
- UK Parliament: Canterbury

Bekesbourne is a village and former civil parish, now in the parish of Bekesbourne-with-Patrixbourne, in the Canterbury district, in Kent, South-East England. In 1961 the parish had a population of 538.

The village centre is 2.9 miles (4.7 km) east-south-east of Canterbury Cathedral and stretches less than 1 km from Bekesbourne railway station to the A2 road to the south.

== Amenities ==
The parish church is dedicated to Saint Peter and has a Norman doorway, a 13th-century chancel and the first recorded example of brick mathematical tiles.

Howletts Wild Animal Park is in Bekesbourne, the home of many endangered species and the world's largest breeding gorilla colony in captivity.

=== Transport ===
Bekesbourne railway station serves the area, on the line between Canterbury East and Dover Priory railway stations.

The A2 road borders the south of the village's formal area.

== History ==
Bekesbourne was the site of Bekesbourne Aerodrome, which was established during World War I and thrived as the home of the Kent Flying Club until World War II, when it was closed. One large hangar remained. It was severely damaged by the Great Storm of 1987, but soon rebuilt. It was demolished in 1997, and replaced by 10 detached houses on a new road, De Havillands. (Note: De Havilland was a make of aircraft, important in early British aviation.)

On 1 April 1987 the parish was abolished to form "Bekesbourne with Patrixbourne", part also went to Adisham and the unparished area of Canterbury.

== Famous residents ==
- Bekesbourne was the birthplace of the film director Michael Powell and of Stephen Hales, the physiologist, chemist and inventor.
- Ian Fleming, the author of the James Bond books, lived at the Old Palace in Bekesbourne.
