= Listed buildings in Bekesbourne-with-Patrixbourne =

Civil Parish in Kent, England

Bekesbourne-with-Patrixbourne is a village and civil parish in the City of Canterbury district of Kent, England. It contains 37 listed buildings that are recorded in the National Heritage List for England. Of these two are grade I, two are grade II* and 33 are grade II.

This list is based on the information retrieved online from Historic England.

== Key ==
Grade	Criteria
I	Buildings that are of exceptional interest
II*	Particularly important buildings of more than special interest
II	Buildings that are of special interest

== Listing ==
Name	Grade	Location	Type	Completed (Note: The date given is the date used by Historic England as significant for the initial building or that of an important part in the structure's description.)	Date designated	Grid ref. (Note: The grid reference is based on the British national grid reference system, sometimes known as OSGB36, used by the Ordnance Survey.) Geo-coordinates	Notes	Entry number (Note: The "List Entry Number" is a unique number assigned to each listed building and scheduled monument by Historic England.)	Image	Wikidata
Star Cottage	II	Bekesbourne Hill			10 June 1975	TR1893856147; 51°15′45″N 1°08′12″E		1085719	Upload Photo	Q26373988
Former Stables to Howletts (howletts Zoo Park)	II	Bekesbourne Lane, Howletts Zoo Park			14 March 1980	TR1959156779; 51°16′04″N 1°08′47″E		1085720	Upload Photo	Q26373992
Garden Cottage (howletts Zoo Park)	II	Bekesbourne Lane, Howletts Zoo Park			30 January 1967	TR1954856442; 51°15′53″N 1°08′44″E		1111807	Upload Photo	Q26405602
Garden Wall and Gatepiers at Howletts (howletts Zoo Park)	II	Bekesbourne Lane, Howletts Zoo Park			14 March 1980	TR1954256407; 51°15′52″N 1°08′44″E		1336481	Upload Photo	Q26620970
Howletts Zoo	II*	Bekesbourne Lane, Howletts Zoo Park			30 January 1967	TR1962356736; 51°16′03″N 1°08′49″E		1336480	Upload Photo	Q99671114
Howletts Farmhouse	II	Bekesbourne Lane, Howletts Farm			14 March 1980	TR1943556329; 51°15′50″N 1°08′38″E		1085721	Upload Photo	Q26373996
Barn at Hode Farm	II	Bekesbourne Road, Hode Farm			14 March 1980	TR1794855994; 51°15′41″N 1°07′21″E		1085580	Upload Photo	Q26373283
Hode Farmhouse	II	Bekesbourne Road, Hode Farm			30 January 1967	TR1795955941; 51°15′39″N 1°07′21″E		1372290	Upload Photo	Q26653420
The North East Lodge of the Demolished Mansion Bifrons	II	Bifrons Hill, Patrixbourne			29 September 1952	TR1876755419; 51°15′21″N 1°08′02″E		1085581	Upload Photo	Q26373288
Coldharbour Farmhouse	II	Coldharbour Lane, Coldharbour Farm			14 March 1980	TR2017653098; 51°14′04″N 1°09′09″E		1372102	Upload Photo	Q26653230
Keeper's Cottage	II	Keepers Hill, Patrixbourne			14 March 1980	TR1930754875; 51°15′03″N 1°08′28″E		1039903	Upload Photo	Q26291698
Riverside Cottages	II	3 and 4, Old Palace Road, Bekesbourne			9 June 1976	TR1906855207; 51°15′14″N 1°08′17″E		1336482	Upload Photo	Q26620971
Bridge Over Ford Near Parish Church	II	Old Palace Road, Bekesbourne			14 March 1980	TR1941755536; 51°15′24″N 1°08′36″E		1111808	Upload Photo	Q26405603
Court Cottage Tudor Cottage	II	Old Palace Road, Bekesbourne			30 January 1967	TR1905155187; 51°15′14″N 1°08′16″E		1085723	Upload Photo	Q26374008
The Old Palace	II	Old Palace Road, Bekesbourne			14 March 1980	TR1935255550; 51°15′25″N 1°08′32″E		1085722	Upload Photo	Q26374002
Barton Cottage Crest Cottage	II	Patrixbourne Road, Patrixbourne			14 March 1980	TR1898555076; 51°15′10″N 1°08′12″E		1336592	Upload Photo	Q26621075
Bridge Over Nail Bourne	II	Patrixbourne Road, Patrixbourne			9 March 1976	TR1897355089; 51°15′10″N 1°08′12″E		1085583	Upload Photo	Q26373299
Church of St Mary	I	Patrixbourne Road, Patrixbourne	church building		30 January 1967	TR1896255148; 51°15′12″N 1°08′11″E		1336572	Church of St Mary More images	Q17529616
The Barton	II	Patrixbourne Road, Patrixbourne			30 January 1967	TR1899855097; 51°15′11″N 1°08′13″E		1085541	Upload Photo	Q26373079
The Old Vicarage	II	Patrixbourne Road, Patrixbourne			30 January 1967	TR1899255170; 51°15′13″N 1°08′13″E		1039916	Upload Photo	Q26291712
Waterfall Cottages	II	Patrixbourne Road, Patrixbourne			14 March 1980	TR1894155003; 51°15′08″N 1°08′10″E		1039906	Upload Photo	Q26291701
Forecourt Wall to Highland Court Hospital	II	Roman Road			14 March 1980	TR1933353728; 51°14′26″N 1°08′27″E		1336593	Upload Photo	Q26621076
Highland Court Hospital	II*	Roman Road	house		14 March 1980	TR1934253763; 51°14′27″N 1°08′28″E		1085542	Highland Court Hospital More images	Q5757801
Church of St Peter	I	School Lane, Bekesbourne	church building		30 January 1967	TR1951155469; 51°15′22″N 1°08′40″E		1298996	Church of St Peter More images	Q17529612
Cobham Court	II	School Lane, Bekesbourne			14 March 1980	TR1951655534; 51°15′24″N 1°08′41″E		1336483	Upload Photo	Q26620972
Parsonage Farmhouse	II	School Lane, Bekesbourne			14 March 1980	TR1930855776; 51°15′32″N 1°08′30″E		1085724	Upload Photo	Q26374013
The Old Vicarage	II	School Lane, Bekesbourne			29 September 1952	TR1948255681; 51°15′29″N 1°08′39″E		1186856	Upload Photo	Q26482099
Sondes House	II	Station Road, Bekesbourne			29 September 1952	TR1881355455; 51°15′23″N 1°08′04″E		1298998	Upload Photo	Q26586429
The Cottage	II	Station Road, Bekesbourne			14 March 1980	TR1895555557; 51°15′26″N 1°08′12″E		1336484	Upload Photo	Q26620973
1, 2 and 3, the Green	II	1, 2 and 3, The Green			30 January 1967	TR1904455140; 51°15′12″N 1°08′15″E		1336571	Upload Photo	Q26621054
Footbridge Near the Green	II	The Green			14 March 1980	TR1904055159; 51°15′13″N 1°08′15″E		1372103	Upload Photo	Q26653231
Gatehouse, the Old Palace	II	The Old Palace, Old Palace Road, Bekesbourne			29 September 1952	TR1937455531; 51°15′24″N 1°08′33″E		1186845	Upload Photo	Q26482088
Godden House	II	1, 2 and 3, The Street, Bekesbourne			14 March 1980	TR1890655361; 51°15′19″N 1°08′09″E		1085726	Upload Photo	Q26374023
Oast Cottages	II	1 2 3, The Street, Bekesbourne			14 March 1980	TR1902255223; 51°15′15″N 1°08′14″E		1299000	Upload Photo	Q26586431
Bifrons Cottage	II	The Street, Patrixbourne			14 March 1980	TR1887555356; 51°15′19″N 1°08′07″E		1085543	Upload Photo	Q26373084
Former Oasthouse	II	The Street, Bekesbourne			14 March 1980	TR1900455246; 51°15′15″N 1°08′14″E		1085725	Upload Photo	Q26374017
Lion Cottage	II	The Street, Bekesbourne			14 March 1980	TR1893055331; 51°15′18″N 1°08′10″E		1299003	Upload Photo	Q26586434

== See also ==
- Grade I listed buildings in Kent
- Grade II* listed buildings in Kent

== Sources ==
- Newman, John (2013) [1969], Kent: North-East and East, The Buildings of England, New Haven and London: Yale University Press, ISBN 978-0-300-18506-5
