= Selling railway station =

Railway station in Kent, England

Coordinates: 51°16′37.96″N 0°56′27.98″E

Selling
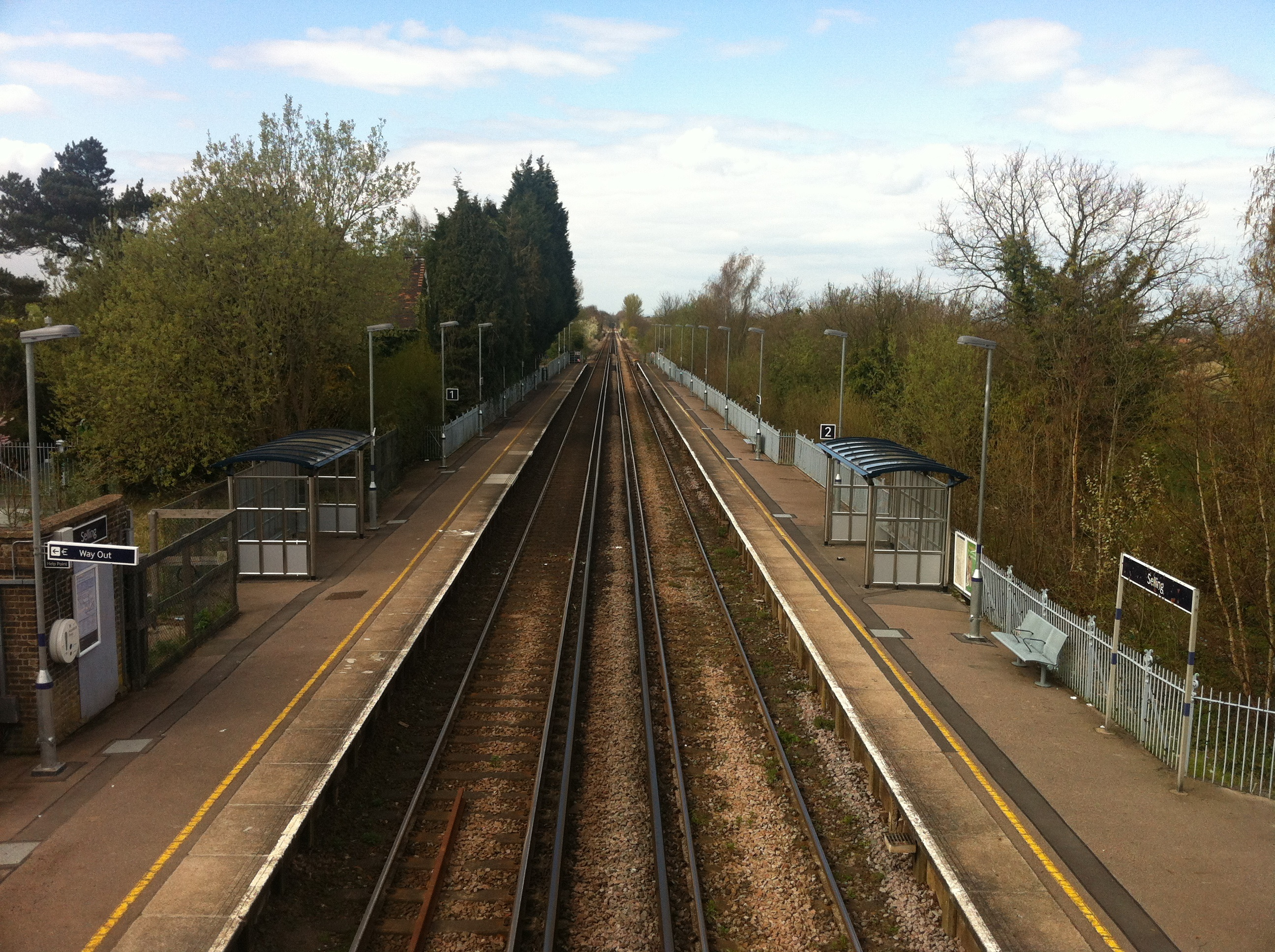
- Selling railway station in 2012

General information
- Location: Selling, Swale; England
- Grid reference: TR052572
- Managed by: Southeastern
- Platforms: 2

Other information
- Station code: SEG
- Classification: DfT category F1

History
- Opened: 3 December 1860

Passengers
- 2020/21: ▼31,328
- 2021/22: ▲63,386
- 2022/23: ▲77,140
- 2023/24: ▲90,862
- 2024/25: ▲99,572
Location
Notes
- Passenger statistics from the Office of Rail and Road

Selling railway station is on the Dover branch of the Chatham Main Line in England, serving the village of Selling, Kent. It is 55 miles 18 chains (88.9 km) down the line from London Victoria and is situated between Faversham and Canterbury East.

The station and all trains that serve the station are operated by Southeastern.

The station and the line on which it is located were built by the London, Chatham & Dover Railway. Formerly an excellent example of country station architecture, it was destroyed by fire from unknown cause in the early 1990s, shortly before it was to be awarded listed building status. The signal box at the station end of the 'up' (London-bound) platform was closed and dismantled shortly afterwards. The box can today be seen in use at Eythorne railway station on the East Kent Railway.

The station was a filming location in the 1944 film A Canterbury Tale, where it was called "Chillingbourne". Charles Hawtrey (of the Carry On films) played the porter. The station now has few facilities.

== Ticketing ==
The station is now unstaffed but was staffed when run by British Rail and was APTIS-equipped until December 1992. Previously a Permit to Travel machine (PERTIS) was available for the purchasing of permits to be exchanged as soon as possible and within a maximum of 2 hours for a full valid ticket. This has been replaced by a S&B Ticket Vending Machine (TVM Lite) machine. This offers a full range of day and open tickets from any station to any station on the UK network with Railcard discounts, subject to the Railcard Restrictions. It also offers Weekly, Monthly and Yearly tickets (photocard or smart Key Card required, previous purchases required for Monthly and above). However TVM Lites only accept card payments and therefore Passengers with cash will need to pay on the train with the Conductor or as soon as possible at the next available staffed ticket office.

== Services ==
All services at Selling are operated by Southeastern using Class 375 EMUs.

The typical off-peak service in trains per hour is:

- 1 tph to London Victoria via Chatham
- 1 tph to Dover Priory

Additional services including trains to and from London Bridge and London Cannon Street call at the station in the peak hours.

Preceding station	National Rail	Following station
Faversham	Southeastern Chatham Main Line - Dover Branch	Canterbury East
