= Adisham railway station =

Railway station in Kent, England

Adisham
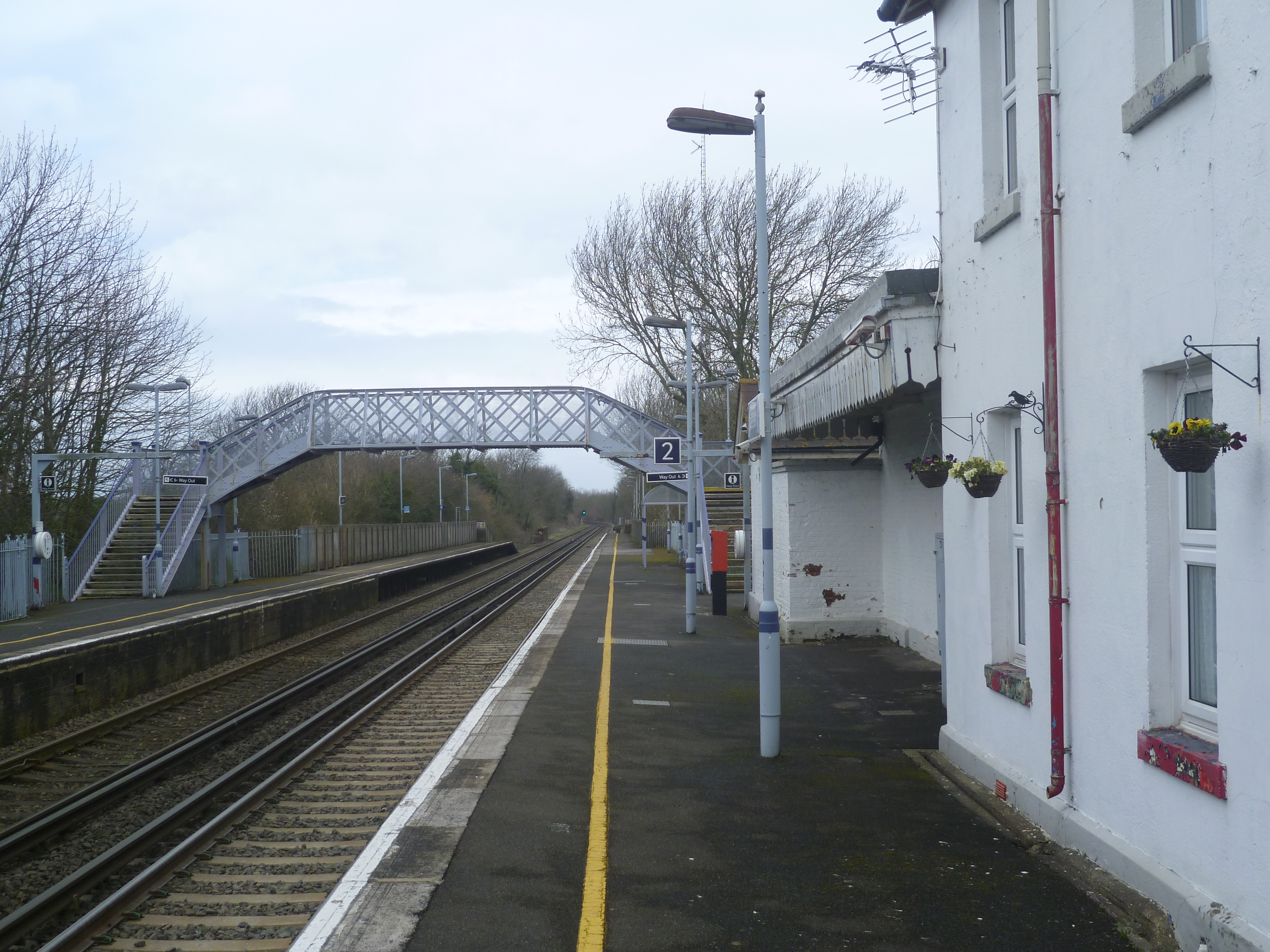

General information
- Location: Adisham, City of Canterbury; England
- Coordinates: 51.2409°N 1.1989°E
- Grid reference: TR233539
- Manager: Southeastern
- Platforms: 2

Other information
- Station code: ADM
- Classification: DfT category F2

History
- Opened: 22 July 1861

Passengers
- 2021/22: ▲19,464
- 2022/23: ▲23,470
- 2023/24: ▲26,744
- 2024/25: ▼26,556
- 2025/26: ▲30,784
Location
Notes
- Passenger statistics from the Office of Rail and Road

Adisham railway station is a stop on the Dover branch of the Chatham Main Line; it serves the village of Adisham, Kent, England. It is 67 miles 60 chains (109.0 km) down the line from London Victoria, situated between Bekesbourne and Aylesham. The station and all trains that serve it are operated by Southeastern.

== History ==
The station and the line it serves were built by the London, Chatham & Dover Railway. It opened on 22 July 1861, becoming part of the Southern Railway during the grouping of 1923. The line then passed on to the Southern Region of British Railways on nationalisation in 1948, until the privatisation of British Rail.

When sectorisation was introduced, the station was served by Network SouthEast.

== Facilities ==
There are brick buildings on the country-bound platform, formerly in railway use but now privately occupied, and a wooden shelter on the London-bound platform. The country-bound platform is accessible by road and the London-bound by public footpath. There is a connecting footbridge.

The station is unstaffed. There is a help point on each platform, electronic departure boards were added in May 2016 and a ticket machine in October the same year.

== Passenger volume ==
Passenger Volume at Adisham
	2019-20	2020-21	2021-22	2022-23
Entries and exits	27,624	7,368	19,464	23,470

== Services ==
All services at Adisham are operated by Southeastern using Class 375 electric multiple units.

The typical off-peak service in trains per hour is:

- 1 tph to London Victoria, via Chatham
- 1 tph to Dover Priory

Additional services including trains to and from London Bridge and London Cannon Street call at the station in the peak hours.

Preceding station	National Rail	Following station
Bekesbourne	Southeastern Chatham Main Line - Dover Branch	Aylesham
