= John Reynolds (agriculturist) =

John Reynolds of Dane Court, Adisham, Kent (1703–1779) was an early agricultural pioneer.

The son of Thomas Reynolds, a Kent Yeoman, John Reynolds enlarged the family farm to 520 acres (210 ha) and developed agricultural methods which came to the attention of the Royal Society of Arts, which presented him with a silver cup for his efforts to modernise agricultural methods.

These methods included the use of kohlrabi (then known as turnip-rooted cabbage) as a winter feed-stuff for livestock, which he introduced from the Netherlands in 1767, a method of growing melons using manure hot-beds and various other innovations mentioned in Dossie's Memoires of Agriculture and Arthur Young's Agricultural Calendar. He also introduced the Swedish turnip, or swede, (Rutabaga) into England.

A tribute to Reynolds in Adisham's parish church was erected after his death. Historian Maurice Crane, who lived in his house two centuries after Reynolds, drew modern attention to his improvement efforts.
