= John Sweet (actor) =

American actor (1916–2011)

John Sweet (February 8, 1916 – July 5, 2011) was a US Army sergeant serving in the UK in World War II when he was selected by Michael Powell and Emeric Pressburger to play the role of Sgt. Bob Johnson, one of the three pilgrims in the 1944 feature film A Canterbury Tale.

Sweet was born in Minneapolis, Minnesota. After the movie, he went back to the United States and made a few attempts at an acting career, notably in theater, but finally decided to go back to his original profession, teaching. Sweet returned to Canterbury in October 2000 to join Sheila Sim for a Michael Powell celebration and gave a 20-minute interview in the documentary A Pilgrim's Return by Nick Burton and Eddie McMillan. This documentary is featured in the Criterion Collection DVD of the film. The soft-spoken Sweet provides details about the shooting of the movie, his relationship with Michael Powell and the rest of the crew, and the effect the film has had on his life. Sweet stated that "The few months I spent making the film were the most profound and influential of my life".

Sweet was paid $2,000 for working on A Canterbury Tale, all of which he donated to the National Association for the Advancement of Colored People, a remarkable gesture for the time.

Sweet died at home in Fearrington Village, North Carolina, on July 5, 2011, aged 95.
