= Bekesbourne-with-Patrixbourne =

Civil parish in Kent, England

Coordinates: 51.2600°N 1.1413°E

- Location within Kent
- Population: 925 (2011)
- OS grid reference: TR191559
- Civil parish: Bekesbourne-with-Patrixbourne
- District: Canterbury
- Shire county: Kent
- Region: South East
- Country: England
- Sovereign state: United Kingdom
- Post town: CANTERBURY
- Postcode district: CT4
- Dialling code: 01227
- Police: Kent
- Fire: Kent
- Ambulance: South East Coast
- UK Parliament: Canterbury

Bekesbourne-with-Patrixbourne is a civil parish in the City of Canterbury district of Kent, England. It is located 4 miles south-east of Canterbury.

According to the 2001 census it had a population of 868, increasing to 925 at the 2011 Census. The parish consists of Bekesbourne and Patrixbourne. It is most famous for being the home location of Howletts Wild Animal Park, but it is also renowned for the growing of hops and sunflowers.

It has one church and has a medieval historical connection with Archbishop Thomas Cranmer, who was responsible for the reform of the Church of England under Henry VIII.

The archiepiscopal palace was built around 1552 for Cranmer incorporating other buildings belonging to Christchurch, Canterbury. It was destroyed in the Civil War and only the gatehouse, now a cottage, survives. The gatehouse consists of two storeys of red brick laid in English bond and a hipped slate roof. In the west wall is a four-centred stone doorway with a stone over it inscribed "T C 1552" and a cartouche of the arms of Archbishop Parker of Canterbury.

== See also ==
- Listed buildings in Bekesbourne-with-Patrixbourne
