= Selling, Kent =

Village in Kent, England

Coordinates: 51.2711°N 0.9218°E

Selling
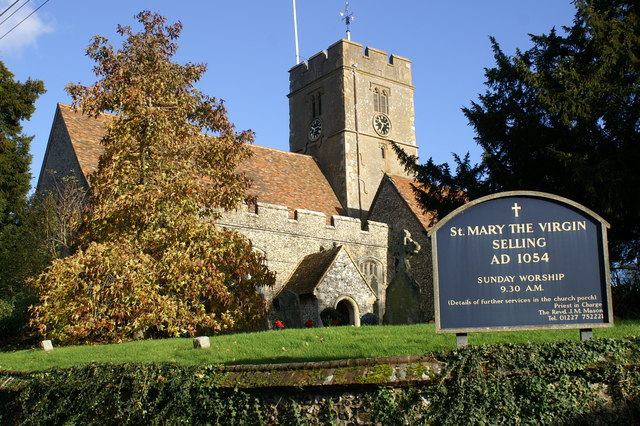
- St Mary's Church, Selling

- Location within Kent
- Population: 849 (2011)
- OS grid reference: TR038567
- Civil parish: Selling
- District: Swale
- Shire county: Kent
- Region: South East
- Country: England
- Sovereign state: United Kingdom
- Post town: Faversham
- Postcode district: ME13
- Dialling code: 01227
- Police: Kent
- Fire: Kent
- Ambulance: South East Coast
- UK Parliament: Faversham and Mid Kent

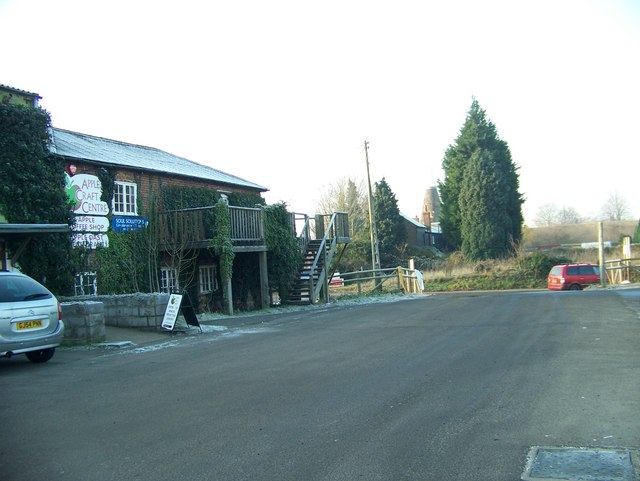
Apple Craft Centre, Faversham

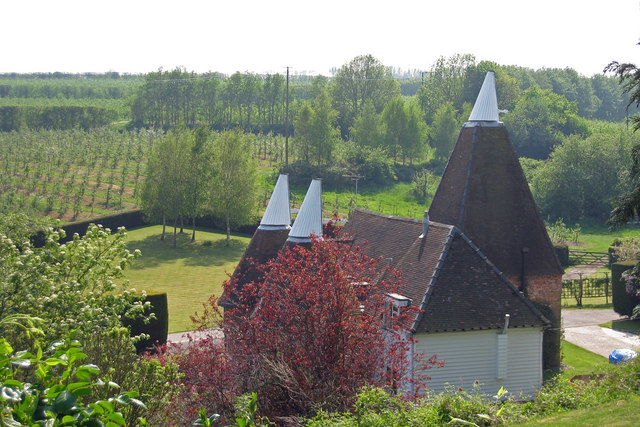
Stone Stile Oast with orchards, Selling

Selling is a village and civil parish south-east of Faversham and west of Canterbury in Kent, England.

== History ==
The village dates back to the Domesday Survey and is recorded as 'Selinge' or 'Sellinge subtus Bleane'.

The tax of the manor of the Selling in 1130, was given to the Monastery of St. Augustine. In 1552, (after the Dissolution of the Monasteries), it passed to Sir Anthony St. Leger. His son Sir Warham St. Leger passed it to Sir Michael Sondes (of Throwley). His descendant was Sir George Sondes, earl of Faversham. Then Louis de Duras, 2nd Earl of Feversham and Lewis Watson, 1st Earl of Rockingham (who had married the daughters of Sir George). It later stayed in the Watson family. In 1800 Earl Sondes was the owner.

The church of St Mary has the highest architectural, Grade I, listing and stands surrounded by a cluster of historic houses of varying date (averaging 17th century) just off the slightly more densely populated heart of the village. Each stained glass lancet window is intricately decorated, with the arms of Gilbert de Clare and others dating the earliest to between 1299–1307 and the transepts of the church itself are approximately 1190 with the rest of the large structure 13th, 15th and 19th century.

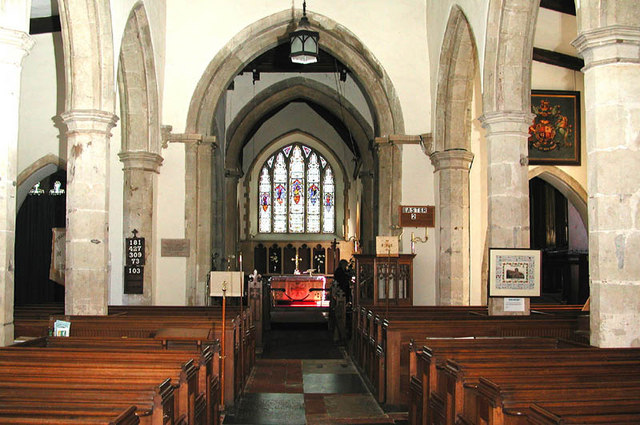
St Mary's Church interior

The following other buildings are listed (at Grade II) in the village centre:

Greenways
The White Lion Public House
Gate And Overthrow 20 m S. of Church
Norham House
Barn about 30 m S. of Norham House
Bier House or Mortuary Chapel 30 m SE of Church
Church House
The Village Shop
Luton Cottages
Norham Cottage
Old Oast Cottage
Stables and Pump about 10 m E. of the Old Vicarage
Luton Cottage
Forge Cottage
Ye Olde Timbers
The Old Vicarage
Luton House

There are several oast houses in the area, such as the Harefield Oast house, designed for kiln (drying) hops as part of the beer brewing process.

== Geography ==
The village is hilly, sloping down Kent Downs AONB to the south and east, with its northern point at an elevation of 30 m and a southern ancient earthwork on the summit of Perry Wood at 145 m.

Surrounding are its hamlets of Hogben's Hill, west, Gushmere, north, Neames Forstal by the station to the north-east, Shepherds Hill and Perrywood, south. There is a network of roads however neither rivers nor A or B roads within this parish. A pumping station is sited at the northernmost point which is on Brenley Lane which runs the 1.5 miles (2.4 km) to Junction 7 of the M2.

The village has a single country estate, owned by the Swire Family. There are several farms, the largest of which is Norham Farm owned by Gaskains.

There is a peak view point over the Canterbury and the countryside to Sandwich Bay in the woodlands at The Mount in Perry Wood which has an adjoining picnic area and walks.

== Transport ==
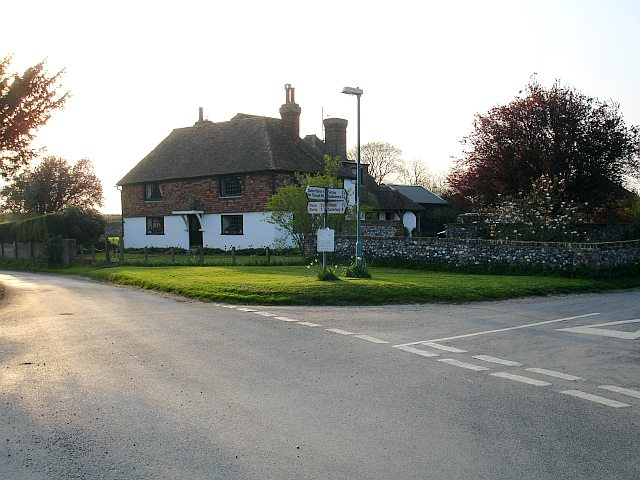
Shottenden Crossroads

The nearest railway stations are Selling and Chilham. Selling railway station is about 1 km northeast of the village on the Chatham Main Line and is between Faversham and Canterbury East station with direct connections to London Victoria and Dover Priory stations.

== Education ==
There is a small primary school, Selling Church of England Primary School (founded 1872), for reception aged children through to Year 6 (approximate ages 6–11). It currently has approximately 130 pupils. The school celebrated its 150th birthday on 1 April 2022.
