= Listed buildings in Adisham =

Civil Parish in Kent, England

Adisham is a village and civil parish in the City of Canterbury district of Kent, England. It contains 14 listed buildings that are recorded in the National Heritage List for England. Of these one is grade I and 13 are grade II.

This list is based on the information retrieved online from Historic England.

== Key ==
Grade	Criteria
I	Buildings that are of exceptional interest
II*	Particularly important buildings of more than special interest
II	Buildings that are of special interest

== Listing ==
Name	Grade	Location	Type	Completed (Note: The date given is the date used by Historic England as significant for the initial building or that of an important part in the structure's description.)	Date designated	Grid ref. (Note: The grid reference is based on the British national grid reference system, sometimes known as OSGB36, used by the Ordnance Survey.) Geo-coordinates	Notes	Entry number (Note: The "List Entry Number" is a unique number assigned to each listed building and scheduled monument by Historic England.)	Image	Wikidata
Adisham Court	II	Bekesbourne Road, Adisham Court			29 September 1952	TR2271454297; 51°14′40″N 1°11′23″E		1121867	Adisham Court	Q26415010
Elm House	II	Bekesbourne Road			14 March 1980	TR2282654270; 51°14′39″N 1°11′28″E		1084923	Elm House	Q26369829
Bossington House	II	Bossington			14 March 1980	TR2334554998; 51°15′01″N 1°11′57″E		1123752	Upload Photo	Q26416850
Great Bossington Farmhouse	II	Bossington, Bossington Farm			30 January 1967	TR2352955266; 51°15′10″N 1°12′07″E		1084924	Upload Photo	Q26369835
Little Bossington Farmhouse	II	Bossington, Little Bossington Farm			14 March 1980	TR2334154810; 51°14′55″N 1°11′56″E		1336871	Little Bossington Farmhouse	Q26621336
Church of the Holy Innocents	I	Church Lane	church building		30 January 1967	TR2276554268; 51°14′39″N 1°11′25″E		1123715	Church of the Holy Innocents More images	Q17529571
Cooting Farmhouse	II	Cooting Lane, Cooting Farm			14 March 1980	TR2268753161; 51°14′03″N 1°11′19″E		1336872	Upload Photo	Q26621337
Pond Cottages	II	1 and 2, The Street			14 March 1980	TR2283454210; 51°14′37″N 1°11′29″E		1337670	Upload Photo	Q26622064
Court Lodge	II	The Street			14 March 1980	TR2279554181; 51°14′36″N 1°11′26″E		1337666	Upload Photo	Q26622060
Dane Court	II	The Street			30 January 1967	TR2252253547; 51°14′16″N 1°11′11″E		1084926	Upload Photo	Q26369846
Manor Farmhouse	II	The Street, Manor Farm			20 September 1952	TR2287554201; 51°14′36″N 1°11′31″E		1084925	Manor Farmhouse	Q26369841
Woodland's Farmhouse	II	The Street, Woodlands Farm			4 April 1975	TR2247753558; 51°14′16″N 1°11′09″E		1337671	Upload Photo	Q26622065
Water Tower	II	Woodlands Road			26 October 2001	TR2092553430; 51°14′14″N 1°09′49″E		1389656	Water Tower More images	Q26669089
Woodlands Manor	II	Woodlands Road, Woodlands Manor			14 March 1980	TR2138353263; 51°14′08″N 1°10′12″E		1336873	Woodlands Manor	Q26621338

== See also ==
- Grade I listed buildings in Kent
- Grade II* listed buildings in Kent

== Sources ==
- Newman, John (2013) [1969], Kent: North-East and East, The Buildings of England, New Haven and London: Yale University Press, ISBN 978-0-300-18506-5
