= Bekesbourne railway station =

Railway station in Kent, England

Coordinates: 51.261°N 1.137°E

Bekesbourne
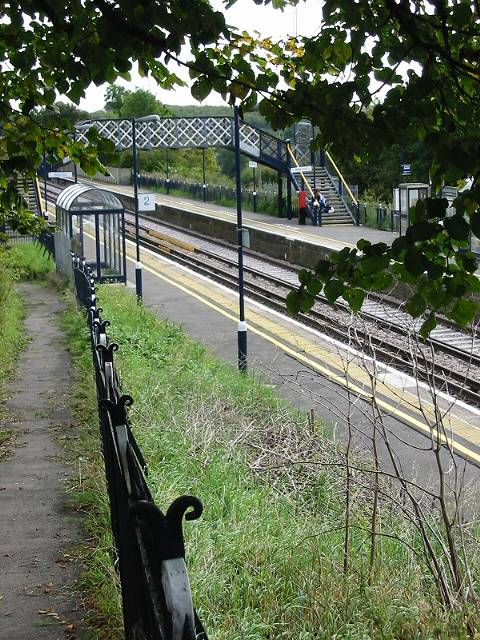

General information
- Location: Bekesbourne, City of Canterbury; England
- Grid reference: TR189560
- Manager: Southeastern
- Platforms: 2

Other information
- Station code: BKS
- Classification: DfT category F2

History
- Opened: 22 July 1861

Passengers
- 2021/22: ▲19,584
- 2022/23: ▲22,870
- 2023/24: ▲29,130
- 2024/25: ▲37,720
- 2025/26: ▼37,672
Location
Notes
- Passenger statistics from the Office of Rail and Road

Bekesbourne railway station is on the Dover branch of the Chatham Main Line; it serves the villages of Bekesbourne and Patrixbourne, in Kent, England. It is sited 64 miles 58 chains (104.2 km) down the line from London Victoria, situated between Canterbury East and Adisham.

The station and all trains that serve the station are operated by Southeastern.

== History ==
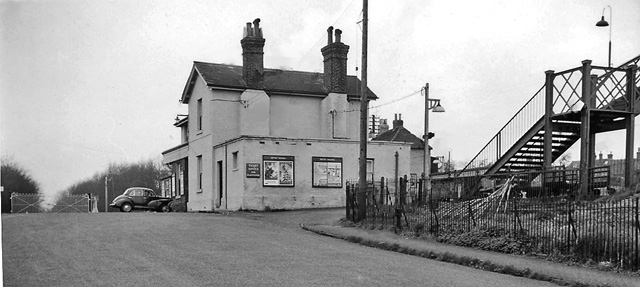
The station in 1963

The station and the line it serves were built by the London, Chatham & Dover Railway and opened on 22 July 1861. The platforms are linked by a footbridge and country-bound platform is accessible by public footpath. Nearby is a viaduct over the Nailbourne Stream, a tributary of the River Stour.

== Facilities ==
Bekesbourne station is unstaffed and facilities are limited. Tickets can be purchased from the self-service ticket machine at the station and there are passenger help points located on each platforms. There is also a basic shelter located on each platform.

There is also a small chargeable car park located at the station.

Step-free access is available to both of the platforms.

== Services ==
All services at Bekesbourne are operated by Southeastern using Class 375 electric multiple units.

The typical off-peak service in trains per hour is:

- 1 tph to London Victoria via Chatham
- 1 tph to Dover Priory

Additional services including trains to and from London Bridge and London Cannon Street call at the station in the peak hours.

Preceding station	National Rail	Following station
Canterbury East	Southeastern Chatham Main Line - Dover Branch	Adisham
