= Adisham =

Village in Kent, England

Coordinates: 51.243°N 1.191°E

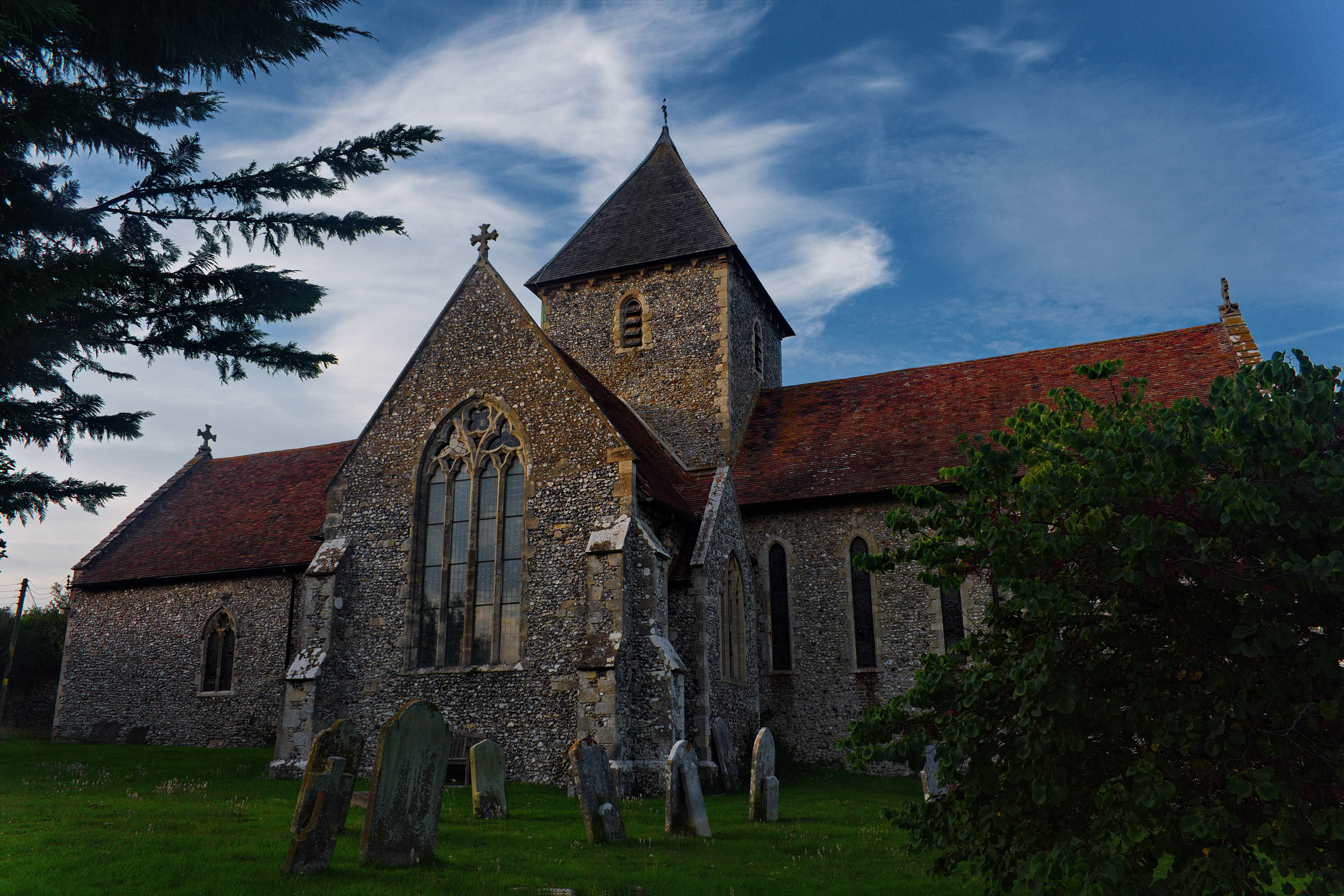
- Holy Innocents Church, Adisham

- Location within Kent
- Area: 11.82 km^{2} (4.56 sq mi)
- Population: 657 (recent estimation of june 2025)
  - Density: 56/km^{2} (150/sq mi)
- OS grid reference: TR226540
- Civil parish: Adisham
- District: City of Canterbury
- Shire county: Kent
- Region: South East
- Country: England
- Sovereign state: United Kingdom
- Post town: CANTERBURY
- Postcode district: CT3
- Dialling code: 01304
- Police: Kent
- Fire: Kent
- Ambulance: South East Coast
- UK Parliament: Canterbury

Adisham (formerly Adesham) is a village and civil parish in the English county of Kent. It is twinned with Campagne-lès-Hesdin in France.

== Geography ==
The village centre, six miles south-east from the city of Canterbury is on the B2046 road between Wingham and Barham. It was known as Edesham in the Domesday Book.

A clustered village, the cluster is within 0.5 kilometres (0.31 mi) from the central cluster of Aylesham.

The village lies on one of the routes that formed part of the Pilgrims' Way immortalised by Geoffrey Chaucer in his book The Canterbury Tales. In 2010, this was the subject of a villagers' protest when local landowner and former banker to the Queen, Timothy Steel, tried to ban walkers from part of the route. After a public enquiry, public rights of way were Council-designated on paths on his land including the path of the former Pilgrims Way.

== Amenities ==
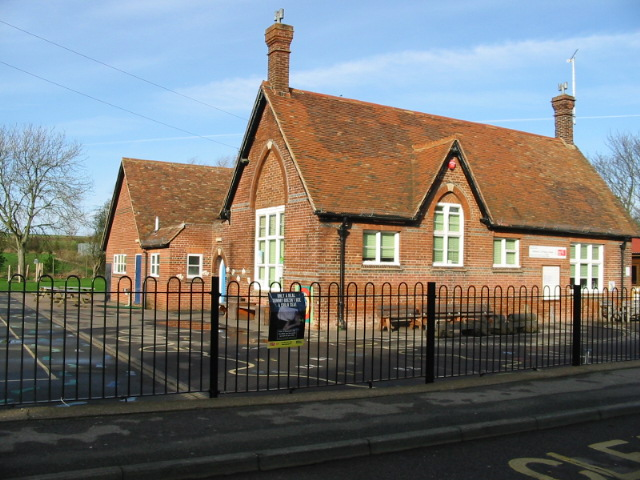
Adisham Primary School

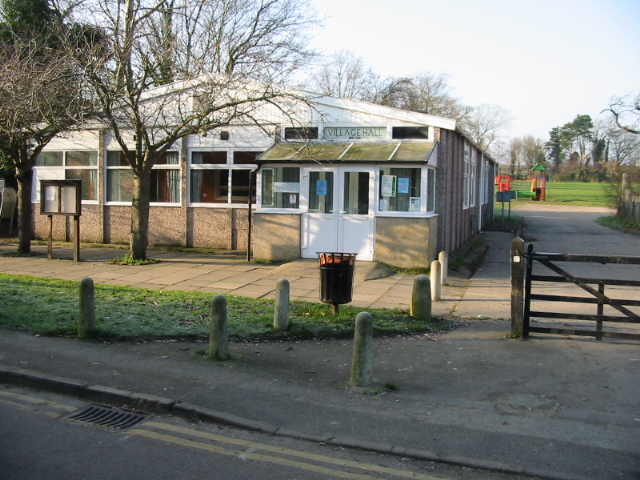
Adisham village hall and recreation ground

The village church is dedicated to Holy Innocents, and dates to around the late 12th century.

The village hall, built in 1908, is still used for public events, including parish council meetings, boot fairs and Big Breakfast on the first Saturday of most months.

Adisham Church of England Primary School is next to the village hall.

The recreation ground behind the village hall opened to the public in 1921,.

The village shop closed in 2004 and the Bull's Head pub around 2010.

The Woodlands Road water tower was built in 1903 and is a Grade II listed building.

== Transport ==
Adisham railway station opened on 22 July 1861. It is on the Chatham Main Line - Dover Branch. There is also a daily bus service to Canterbury.

== Notable residents ==
The Rector of Adisham in the archdiocese of Canterbury, Master John "The Martyr" Bland. Bland was a Protestant minister during the reign of Queen Mary I, who had him burned at the stake on 12 July 1555, being found guilty of heresy.

Agricultural pioneer John Reynolds, who introduced the Swedish turnip, or swede, into England, lived in Adisham.

== See also ==
- Listed buildings in Adisham
