= Canterbury East railway station =

Railway station in Kent, England

Coordinates: 51°16′27.28″N 1°4′33.34″E

Canterbury East
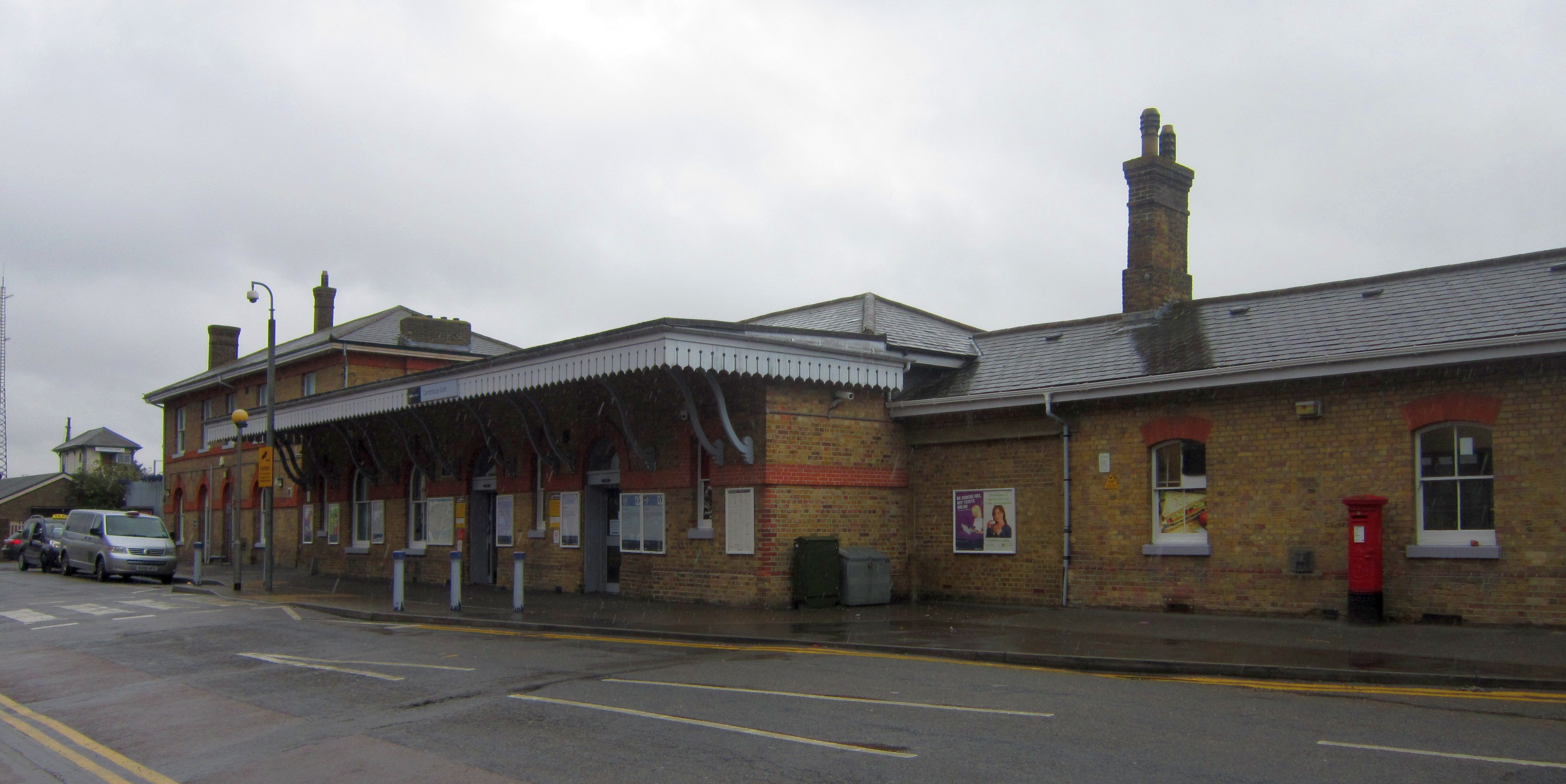
- Station building

General information
- Location: Canterbury, City of Canterbury; England
- Grid reference: TR146572
- Manager: Southeastern
- Platforms: 2

Other information
- Station code: CBE
- Classification: DfT category C1

History
- Opened: 9 July 1860

Passengers
- 2020/21: ▼0.280 million
- Interchange: ▼6,273
- 2021/22: ▲0.771 million
- Interchange: ▲8,680
- 2022/23: ▲0.936 million
- Interchange: ▲9,490
- 2023/24: ▲1.059 million
- Interchange: ▲29,607
- 2024/25: ▲1.170 million
- Interchange: ▲38,101
Location
Notes
- Passenger statistics from the Office of Rail and Road

Canterbury East railway station is on the Dover branch of the Chatham Main Line in England, and is one of two stations serving the city of Canterbury, Kent.

The station and all trains that serve the station are operated by Southeastern.

== Location ==
The station is 61 miles 65 chains (99.5 km) down the line from London Victoria (measured via Herne Hill) and is situated between Selling and Bekesbourne. All serving trains are operated by Southeastern.

The station is approximately 1/2 mile (0.8 km) to the south of Canterbury’s other station, Canterbury West. Both stations are located due west of Canterbury’s city centre; despite their names, the two stations lie on almost the same line of longitude.

== History ==
The station and its line were built by the London, Chatham & Dover Railway and opened on 9 July 1860 as Canterbury. To avoid confusion with the older station also called Canterbury, built by the South Eastern Railway, it was renamed to Canterbury East on 1 July 1889 while the SER station was renamed Canterbury West.

The framework of the platform canopies were originally installed at the never-opened station at Lullingstone.

The semaphore signals at the station were replaced with coloured lights in December 2011. The elevated signal box remains but is no longer in use, with signalling on the line operated from a control room at Gillingham. The signal box was given Grade II listed building status in 2013.

Canterbury East's ticket barriers were removed in early 2011, as they were the only ones of the kind in the country and spare parts were no longer easy to obtain. Work began to install a new gate-line in October 2016. Coventry and Earlsfield are the only other stations to lose their ticket barriers.

The station has a ticket office, an electronic ticket machine, a cafe and toilets. A footbridge and lifts were opened in 2021. There is also a connection to local buses including buses to Faversham, London Road Estate, Ashford and to Whitstable, Herne Bay and The University of Kent. A footbridge from the station crosses the city's ring road allowing easy, step-free, access into the city centre via the path along the top of the restored city wall.

== Services ==
All services at Canterbury East are operated by Southeastern using Class 375 EMUs.

The typical off-peak service in trains per hour is:

- 1 tph to London Victoria via Chatham
- 1 tph to Dover Priory

Additional services including trains to and from London Bridge and London Cannon Street call at the station in the peak hours.

Preceding station	National Rail	Following station
Selling	Southeastern Chatham Main Line - Dover Branch	Bekesbourne

== Bibliography ==
- Butt, R. V. J. (October 1995). The Directory of Railway Stations: details every public and private passenger station, halt, platform and stopping place, past and present (1st ed.). Sparkford: Patrick Stephens Ltd. ISBN 978-1-85260-508-7. OCLC 60251199. OL 11956311M.
- McCarthy, Colin; McCarthy, David (2007). Railway of Britain : Kent and Sussex. Ian Allan Publishing. ISBN 978-0-7110-3222-4.
